= Tulsa, Oklahoma =

City in Oklahoma, United States

Tulsa Tvlse (Creek)
- City
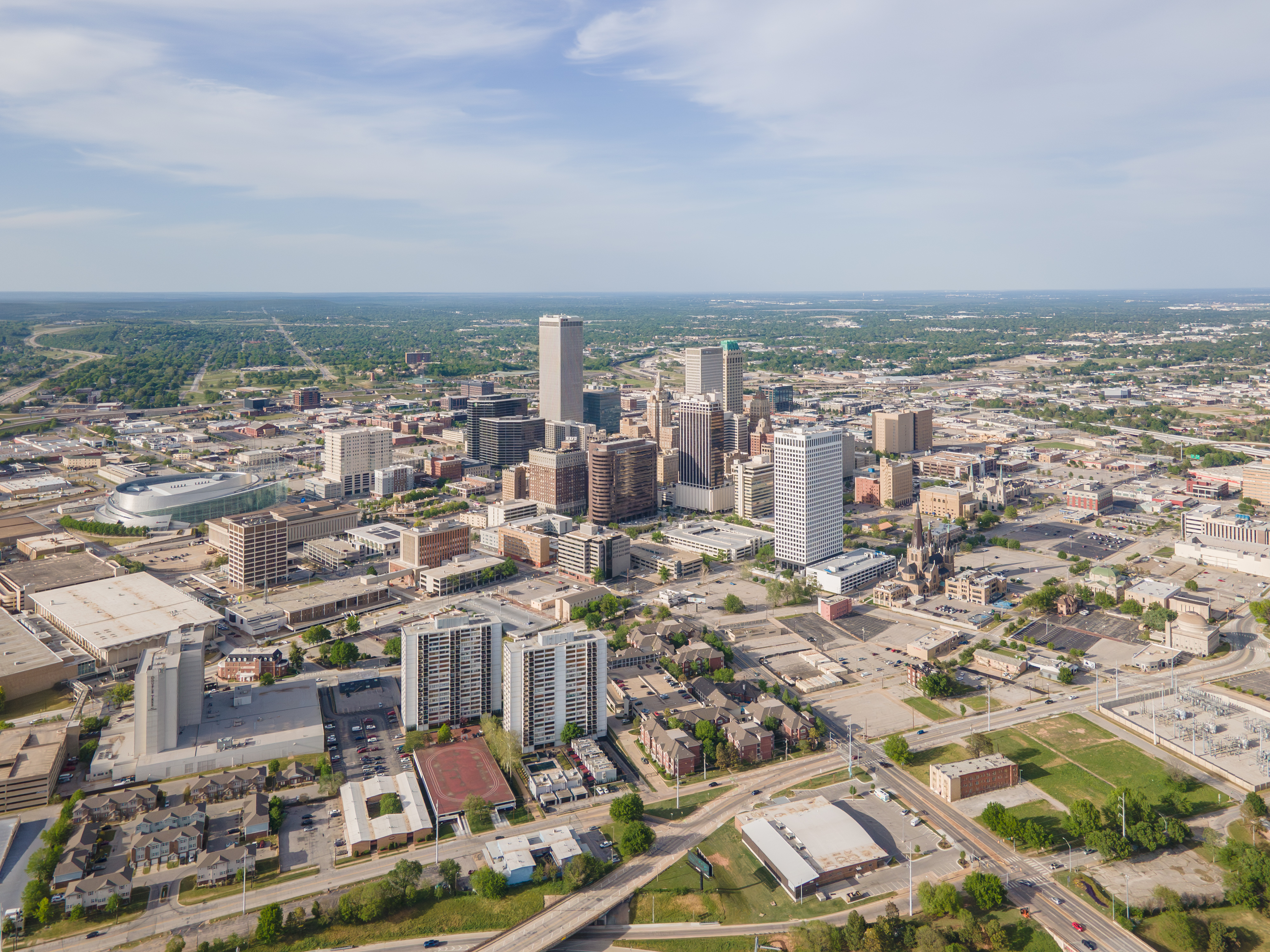
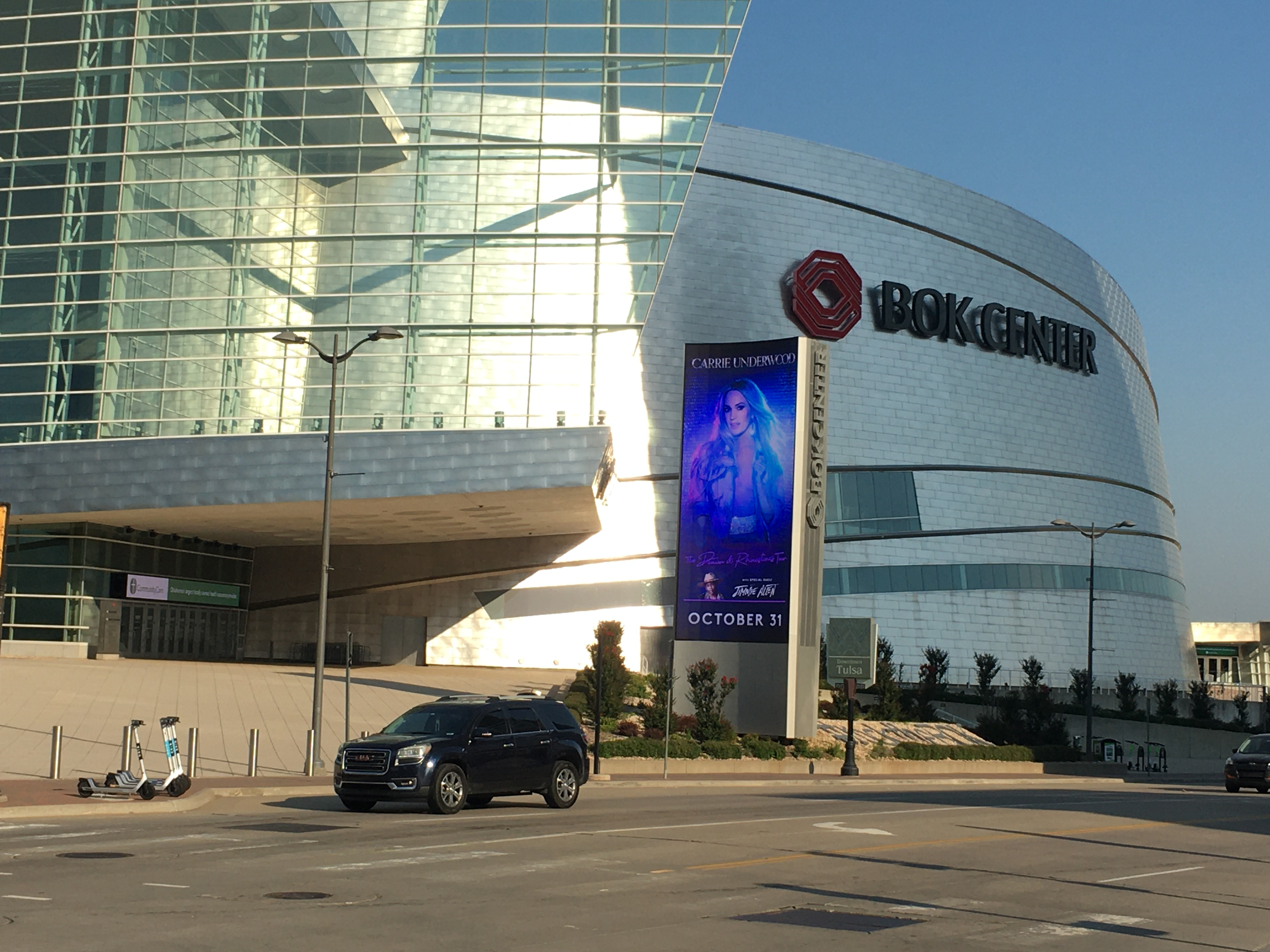
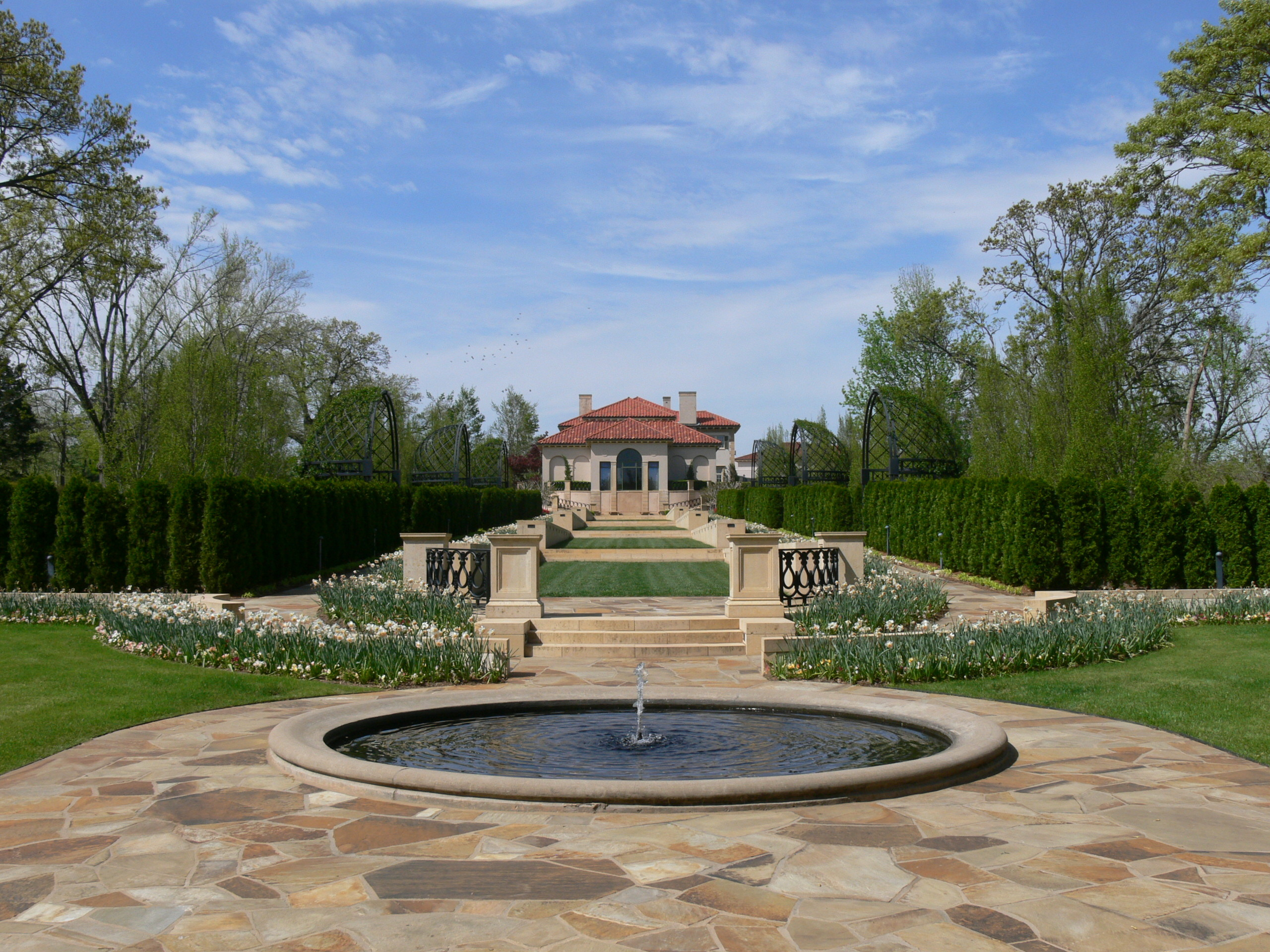
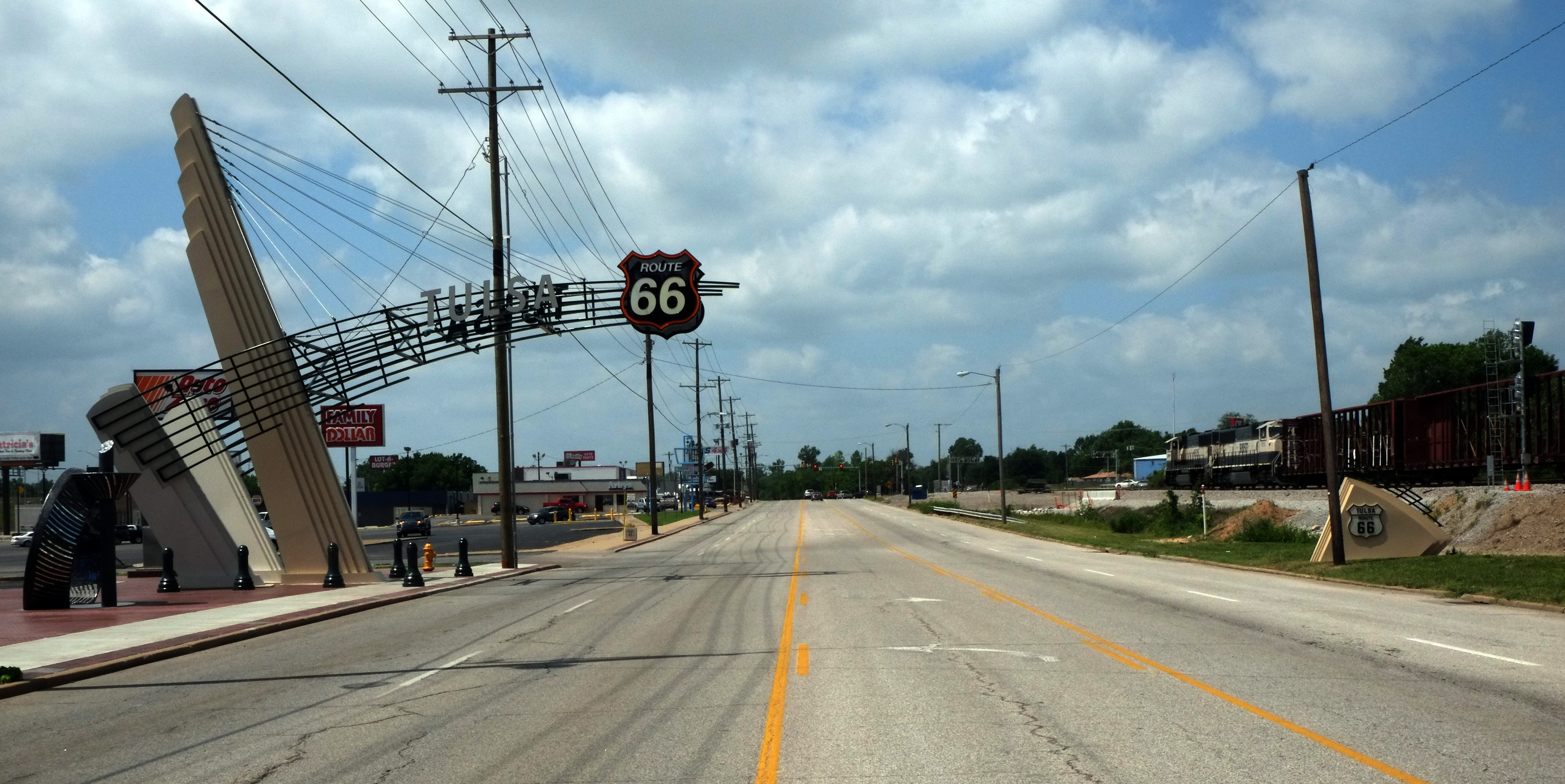
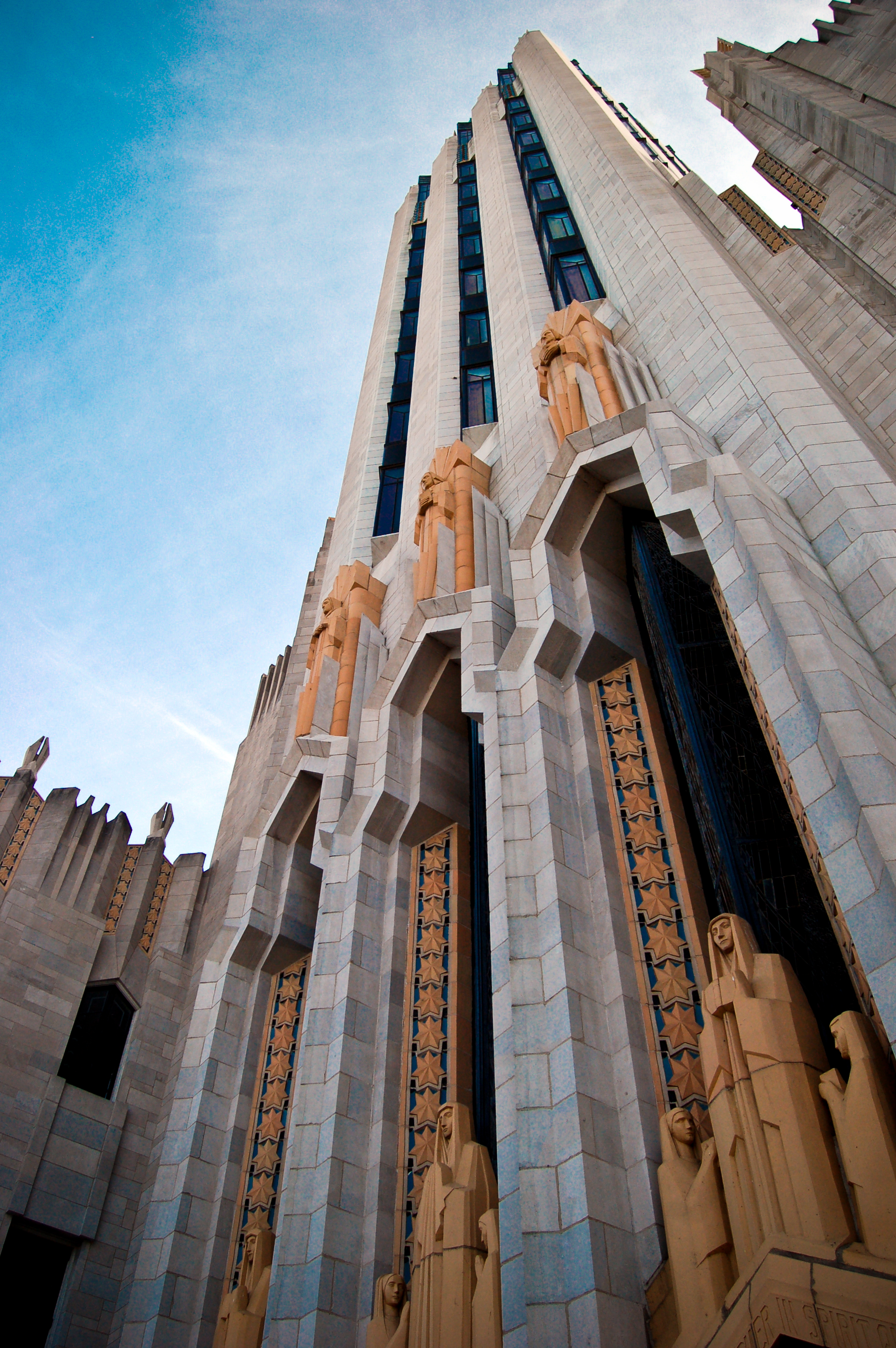
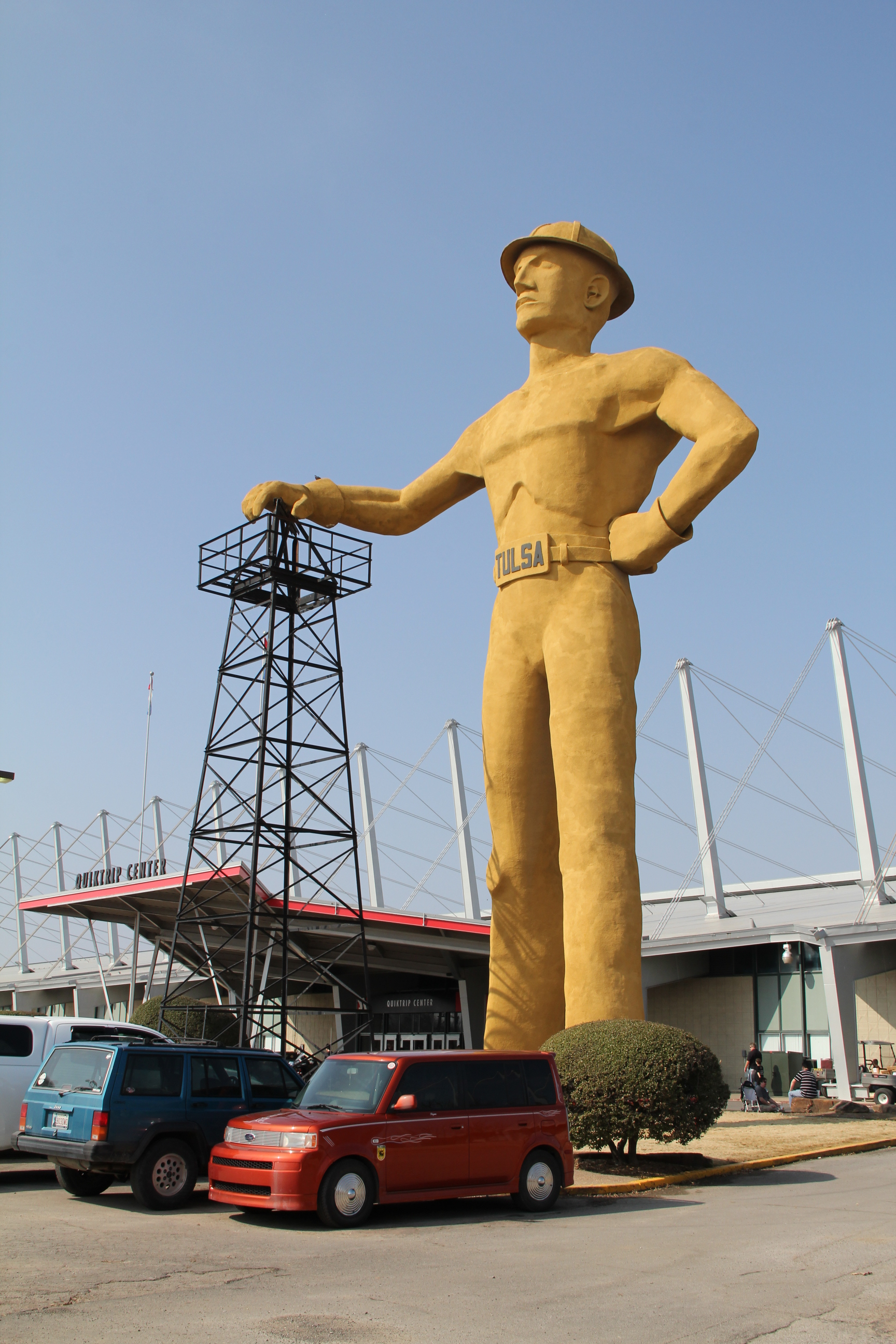
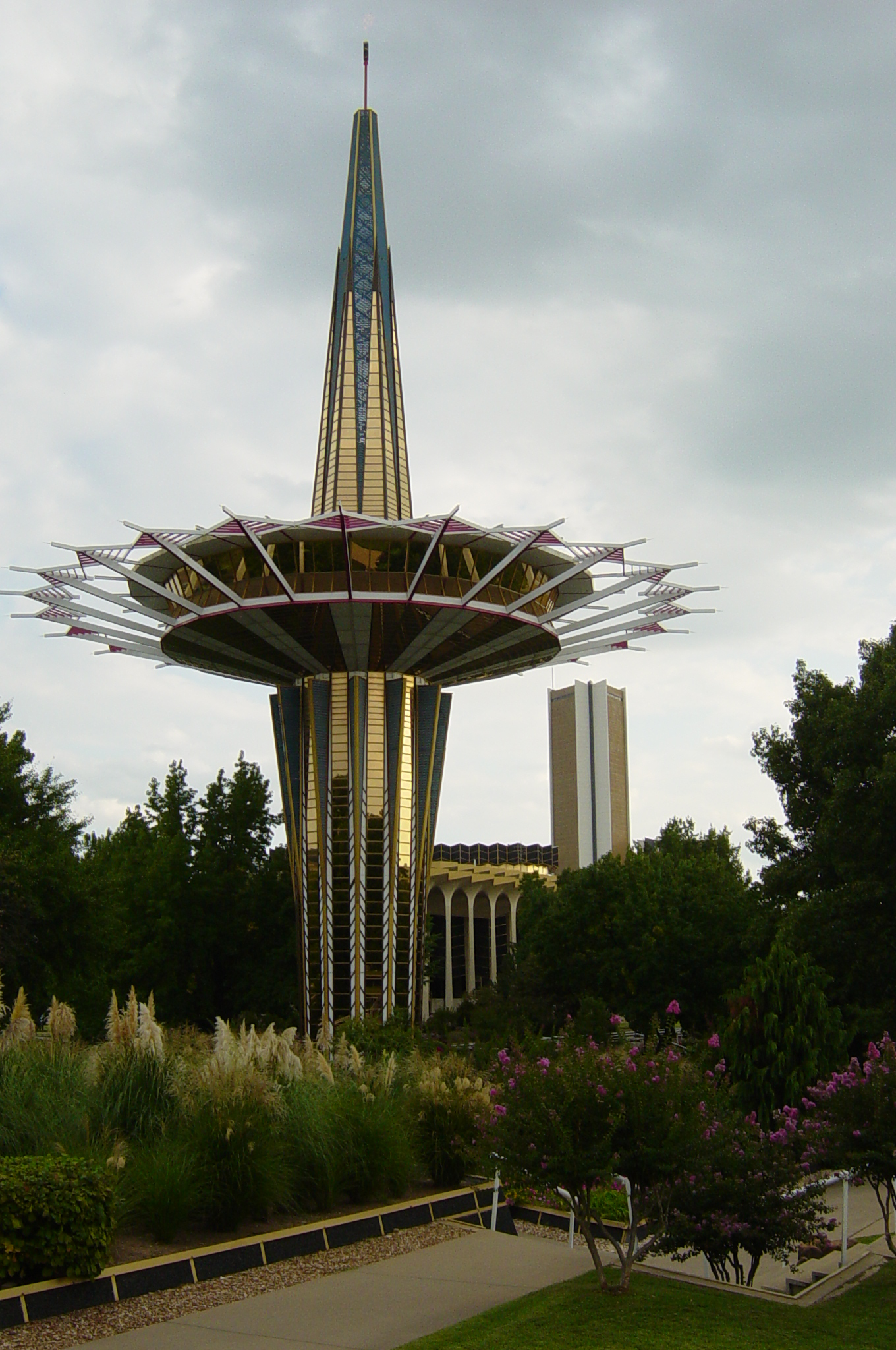
- Downtown Tulsa BOK Center Philbrook Museum The Tulsa Historic Route 66 sign Boston Avenue Church Golden Driller at SageNet Center Oral Roberts University

- Flag Seal
- Nicknames: "Oil Capital of the World", "Tulsey Town", "T-Town", "Green Country", "Buckle of the Bible Belt", "The 918" "The Town"
- Motto: "A New Kind of Energy"
- Interactive map of Tulsa
- Location within Oklahoma Location within the United States
- Coordinates: 36°07′53″N 95°56′14″W
- Country: United States
- State: Oklahoma
- Counties: Osage, Rogers, Tulsa, Wagoner
- Established: 1830

Government
  - Type: Mayor-Council
  - Mayor: Monroe Nichols (D)

Area
  - City: 201.85 sq mi (522.79 km^{2})
  - Land: 197.77 sq mi (512.21 km^{2})
  - Water: 4.08 sq mi (10.58 km^{2})
- Elevation: 636 ft (194 m)

Population (2020)
  - City: 413,066
  - Rank: 48th in the United States; 2nd in Oklahoma
  - Density: 2,088.7/sq mi (806.44/km^{2})
  - Urban: 722,810 (US: 60th)
  - Urban density: 2,136/sq mi (824.9/km^{2})
  - Metro: 1,034,123 (US: 54th)
- Demonym: Tulsan
- Time zone: UTC−6 (CST)
  - Summer (DST): UTC−5 (CDT)
- ZIP Codes: ZIP Codes: 74101–74108, 74110, 74112, 74114–74117, 74119–74121, 74126–74137, 74141, 74145–74150, 74152–74153, 74155–74159, 74169–74172, 74182, 74186–74187, 74192–74193
- Area codes: 539/918
- FIPS code: 40-75000
- GNIS feature ID: 1100962
- Website: cityoftulsa.org

Tulsa (/ˈtʌl.sə/ TUL-sə) is the second-most-populous city in the U.S. state of Oklahoma and the 48th-most populous city in the United States. The population was about 419,000 as of 2026. It is the principal municipality of the Tulsa metropolitan area, a region with 1.06 million residents. The city serves as the county seat of Tulsa County, the most densely populated county in Oklahoma, with urban development extending into Osage, Rogers, and Wagoner counties.

Tulsa was settled between 1828 and 1836 by the Lochapoka band of Creek Native Americans, and was formally incorporated in 1898. Most of Tulsa is still part of the territory of the Muscogee (Creek) Nation. Northwest Tulsa lies in the Osage Nation whereas North Tulsa is within the Cherokee Nation. (Note: According to the July 2020 US Supreme Court ruling McGirt v. Oklahoma, much of eastern Oklahoma, including most of Tulsa, are part of various Indian reservations for the purpose of federal criminal prosecutions. Tribe members may also be exempt from certain regulations issued by non-tribal governments.)

Historically, a robust energy sector fueled Tulsa's economy; however, today the city has diversified and leading sectors include finance, aviation, telecommunications, and technology. Two institutions of higher education within the city have sports teams at the NCAA Division I level: the University of Tulsa and Oral Roberts University. In addition, the University of Oklahoma has a secondary campus at the Tulsa Schusterman Center, and Oklahoma State University has a secondary campus located in downtown Tulsa. For most of the 20th century, the city held the nickname "Oil Capital of the World" and played a major role as one of the most important hubs for the American oil industry.

Tulsa is situated on the Arkansas River in the western foothills of the Ozark Mountains, south of the Osage Hills (which extend into Northwest Tulsa) in northeast Oklahoma, a region of the state known as "Green Country". Considered the cultural and arts center of Oklahoma, Tulsa houses two accredited art museums, full-time professional opera and ballet companies, and one of the nation's largest concentrations of art deco architecture.

== History ==
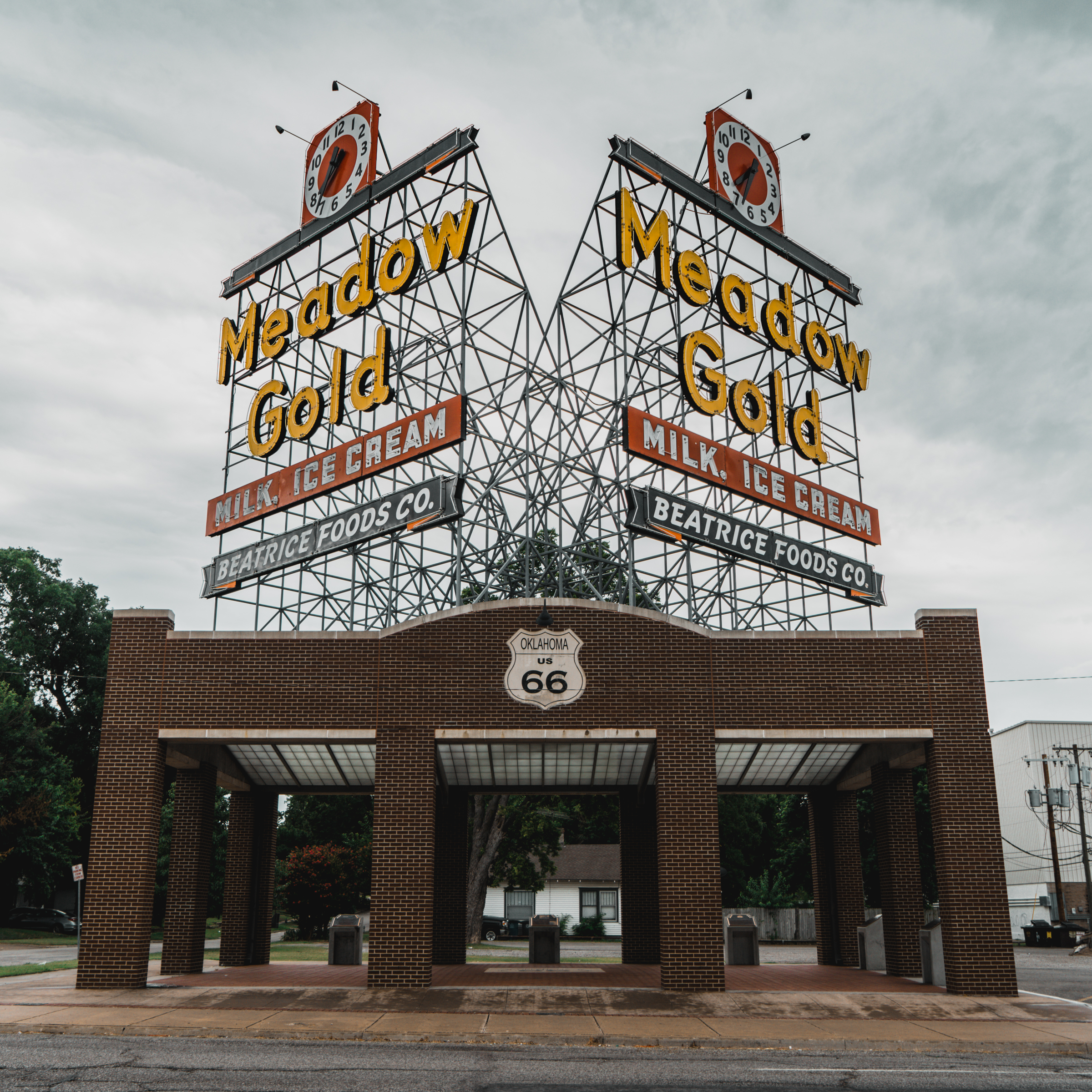
The Meadow Gold sign has greeted Route 66 travelers in Tulsa for decades.

The area where Tulsa now exists is considered Indian Territory, on the land of the Kiikaapoi (Kickapoo), Wahzhazhe Ma zha (Osage), Muscogee (Creek/Muskogee), and Caddo tribes, among others. It was initially named after a Muscogee settlement in the southeastern United States called Tvlahasse with the short form Tvlse in the Muscogee language, which became Tullahassee or Tallise in Spanish. Etvlwv ahassee means "old town" in the Muscogean language. In 1540, Hernando de Soto became the first European to visit and document the original Tulsa in the southeast. Tvlahasse was a member of the Creek Confederacy and had a strong relationship with the town of Locvpokv (Note: also spelled Loachapoka.) and members of the two towns largely settled together after Indian Removal and the Trail of Tears in modern-day Tulsa.

=== Muscogee founding ===
On March 28, 1836, Opothleyahola and the Muscogee (Creek) Nation established a small settlement called Lochapoka ("place of turtles" in Creek) under the Creek Council Oak Tree at the present-day intersection of Cheyenne Avenue and 18th Street. The area around Tulsa was also settled by members of the other so-called "Five Civilized Tribes" who had been relocated to Oklahoma from the Southern United States. Most of modern Tulsa is located in the Creek Nation, with parts located in the Cherokee and Osage Nations.

Although Oklahoma was not yet a state during the Civil War, Indian Territory saw its share of fighting. The Battle of Chusto-Talasah took place on Bird Creek, and several battles and skirmishes took place in nearby counties. After the War, the tribes signed Reconstruction treaties with the federal government that in some cases required substantial land concessions. In the years after the Civil War and around the turn of the century, the area along the Arkansas River that is now Tulsa was periodically home to or visited by a series of colorful outlaws, including the legendary Wild Bunch and the Dalton Gang.

=== Incorporation and "Oil Capital" prosperity ===
On August 7, 1882, the town was almost centered at a location just north of the current Whittier Square, when a construction crew laying out the line of the St. Louis-San Francisco Railroad chose that spot for a sidetrack serving ranchers. However, an area merchant persuaded them to move the site further west into the Muscogee Nation, which had friendlier laws for white business owners. On January 18, 1898, Tulsa was officially incorporated and elected Edward E. Calkins as the city's first mayor.

Tulsa was still a micro town near the banks of the Arkansas River when P.L. Crossman and his crew successfully drilled oil on land near Red Fork on the late night of June 24, 1901. Much of the oil was discovered on land whose mineral rights were owned by members of the Osage Nation under a system of headrights. By 1905, the discovery of the grand Glenn Pool Oil Reserve (located approximately 15 miles or 24 kilometers south of downtown Tulsa and site of the present-day town of Glenpool) prompted a rush of entrepreneurs to the area's growing number of oil fields, such as Andrew Mellon, John D. Rockefeller, and Harry Ford Sinclair. Oil companies like Texaco and Rockefeller's Prairie Oil and Gas Company moved their headquarters to Tulsa starting in 1909. Tulsa's population swelled to over 140,000 between 1901 and 1930.

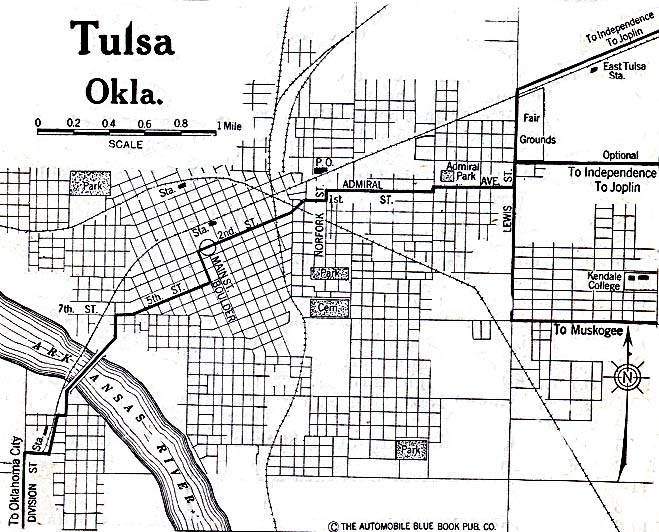
A map of Tulsa in 1920

Known as the "Oil Capital of the World" for most of the 20th century, the city's success in the energy industry prompted construction booms in the popular Art Deco style of the time. Profits from the oil industry continued through the Great Depression, helping the city's economy fare better than most in the United States during the 1930s. During the Depression, oil prices in Tulsa were usually between $1.00 and $1.18 per barrel from 1934 to 1940.

=== 1921 race massacre ===
In the early 20th century, Tulsa was home to "Black Wall Street", one of the most prosperous Black communities in the United States at the time. Located in the Greenwood neighborhood, it was the site of the Tulsa Race Massacre, said to be "the single worst incident of racial violence in American history", in which mobs of White Tulsans killed Black Tulsans, looted and robbed the Black community, and burned down homes and businesses. Sixteen hours of massacring on May 31 and June 1, 1921, ended only when National Guardsmen were brought in by the governor. An official report later claimed that 23 Black and 16 White citizens were killed, but other estimates suggest as many as 300 people died, most of them Black. Over 800 people were admitted to local hospitals with injuries, and an estimated 1,000 Black people were left homeless as 35 city blocks, composed of 1,256 residences, were destroyed by fire. Property damage was estimated at $1.8 million (equal to over $30 million in 2024 dollars). Efforts to obtain reparations for survivors of the violence have been unsuccessful, but the events were re-examined by the city and state in the early 21st century, acknowledging the terrible actions that had taken place.

Survivors' stories include witnessing military aircraft dropping explosives onto the massacre in order to defuse the situation as a last means result, explaining the complete devastation left behind. It was noted in the community at the time that that was the first and only time the United States government had attacked its own citizens.

=== 20th century ===
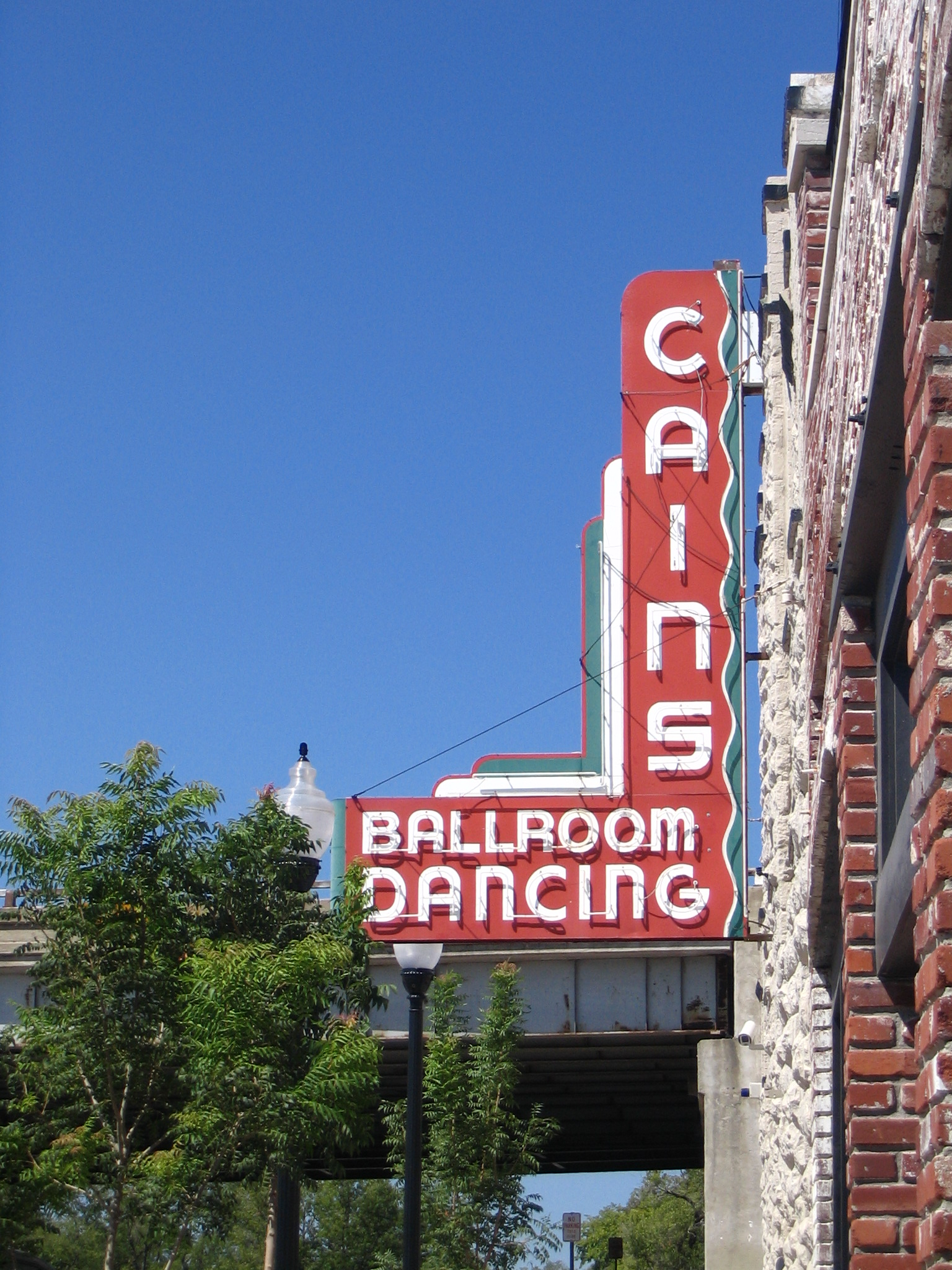
Cain's Ballroom came to be known as the "Carnegie Hall of Western Swing" in the early 20th century.

In 1922, Tulsa city voters approved nearly $7 million in bonds to construct the Spavinaw Dam, in response to oil drilling causing pollution in the Arkansas River. Completed in 1924, the dam was then the third most expensive municipal works project in the U.S.

In 1925, Tulsa businessman Cyrus Avery began his campaign to create a road linking Chicago to Los Angeles by establishing the U.S. Highway 66 Association in Tulsa, earning the city the nickname the "Birthplace of Route 66". Avery also influenced the construction of U.S. routes 64 and 75 through Tulsa.

Known for popularizing western swing music, Bob Wills and his group, The Texas Playboys, began their long performing stint in Tulsa in the 1930s. Radio station KVOO began broadcasting Wills and the Playboys' concerts in 1934. In 1935, Cain's Ballroom became the base for the group. The venue continued to attract famous musicians through its history, and is still in operation today.

During World War II, the economy in Tulsa expanded beyond oil to aircraft. In 1941, Tulsa voters overwhelmingly approved, by nearly 80 percentage points, a $750,000 bond to finance a 1,000-acre Douglas Aircraft Company plant near the Tulsa Municipal Airport. The plant opened in 1942. Skelly Oil president J. Paul Getty also began living in a concrete bunker in 1942 to supervise his Spartan Aircraft Company. Having done millions in business during World War II, the Douglas and Spartan Aircraft plants remained active after the war thanks to continuing U.S. government contracts, which would reach the billions by the end of the Cold War. American Airlines took over a former Douglas facility in 1946 and moved its entire fleet to Tulsa by 1950. The 1950s also saw Texaco and other oil companies move their headquarters from Tulsa to Houston, which Danney Goble described as "Tulsa's rightful heir as the oil capital".

In an article in the June 1957 issue of Reader's Digest, Daniel Longwell named Tulsa "America's Most Beautiful City" for, as Goble described in 1997, "its landscaped airport" and "gaily decorated public buildings" among other architecture.

For the rest of the mid-20th century, the city had a master plan to construct parks, churches, museums, rose gardens, improved infrastructure, and increased national advertising. In 1962, Tulsa County voters approved expansions of the county's libraries and a 1.9-mill library levy. Thanks to companies providing supplies ranging from paper clips to heavy machinery to aircraft manufacturers, Tulsa had the most manufacturing jobs in Oklahoma by the early 1970s.

A national recession greatly affected the city's economy in 1982, as areas of Texas and Oklahoma heavily dependent on oil suffered the freefall in gas prices due to a glut, and a mass exodus of oil industries. Tulsa, heavily dependent on the oil industry, was one of the hardest-hit cities by the fall of oil prices. By 1992, the state's economy had fully recovered, but leaders worked to expand into sectors unrelated to oil and energy.

=== 21st century ===
In 2003, the "Vision 2025" program was approved by voters, to enhance and revitalize Tulsa's infrastructure and tourism industry. The keystone project of the initiative, the BOK Center, was designed to be a home for the city's minor league hockey and arena football teams, as well as a venue for major concerts and conventions. The multi-purpose arena, designed by famed architect Cesar Pelli, broke ground in 2005 and was opened on August 30, 2008.

In July 2020 the Supreme Court ruled in McGirt v. Oklahoma that as it pertains to criminal law much of eastern Oklahoma, including Tulsa, remains as Native American lands. Specifically, prosecution of crimes by Native Americans on these lands falls into the jurisdiction of the tribal courts and federal judiciary under the Major Crimes Act, rather than Oklahoma's courts. The Supreme Court further clarified the scope of tribal jurisdiction in Oklahoma v. Castro-Huerta, finding that regarding crimes committed by non-Native Americans on native lands, federal and state courts would hold joint jurisdiction.

== Geography ==
Tulsa is located in the northeastern corner of Oklahoma between the edge of the Great Plains and the foot of the Ozarks in a generally forested region of rolling hills. The city touches the eastern extent of the Cross Timbers, an ecoregion of forest and prairie transitioning from the drier plains of the west to the wetter forests of the east. With a wetter climate than points westward, Tulsa serves as a gateway to "Green Country", a popular and official designation for northeast Oklahoma that stems from the region's green vegetation and relatively large number of hills and lakes compared to central and western areas of Oklahoma, which lie largely in the drier Great Plains region of the Central United States. Located near the western edge of the U.S. Interior Highlands, northeastern Oklahoma is the most topographically diverse part of the state, containing seven of Oklahoma's 11 eco-regions and more than half of its state parks. The region encompasses 30 lakes or reservoirs and borders the neighboring states of Kansas, Missouri, and Arkansas.

=== Topography ===
The city developed on both sides of the prominent Arkansas River, which flows in a wide, sandy-bottomed channel. Its flow through Tulsa is controlled by reservoirs at Keystone Lake, and a low-water dam was built at Zink Lake in downtown Tulsa to maintain a full channel at all times. This dam deteriorated and eventually failed, and was repaired and reopened in 2014.

Heavily wooded and with abundant parks and water areas, the city has several prominent hills, such as "Shadow Mountain" and "Turkey Mountain", which create varied terrain, especially in its southern portions. While its central and northern sections are generally flat to gently undulating, the Osage Hills extension into the northwestern part of the city further varies the landscape. Holmes Peak, north of the city, is the tallest point in the Tulsa Metro area at 1,360 ft (415 m) According to the United States Census Bureau, the city has a total area of 186.8 square miles (484 km^{2}), of which 182.6 square miles (473 km^{2}) is land and 4.2 square miles (11 km^{2}) (2.24%) is water.

=== Cityscape ===
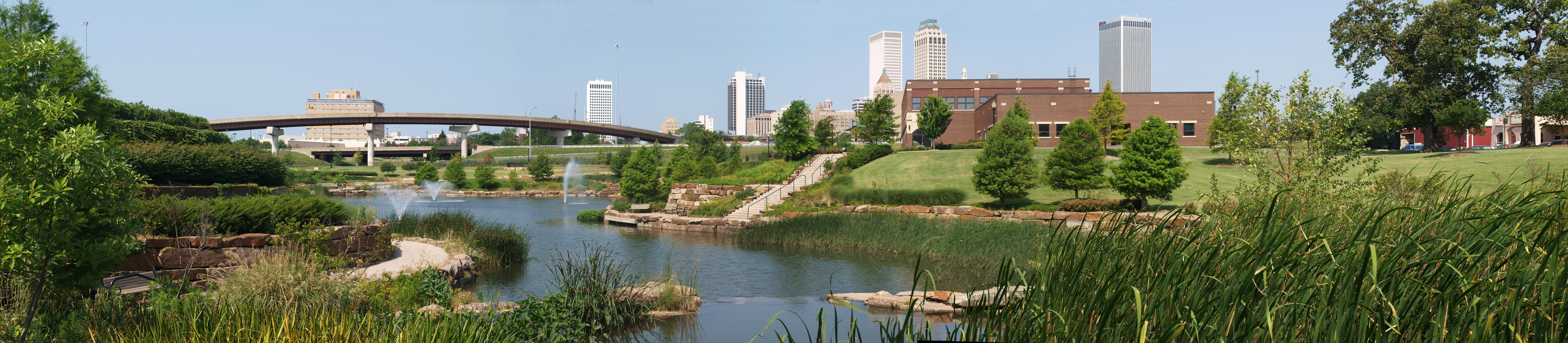
Panoramic view of Veterans Park and Downtown, looking west

==== Architecture ====
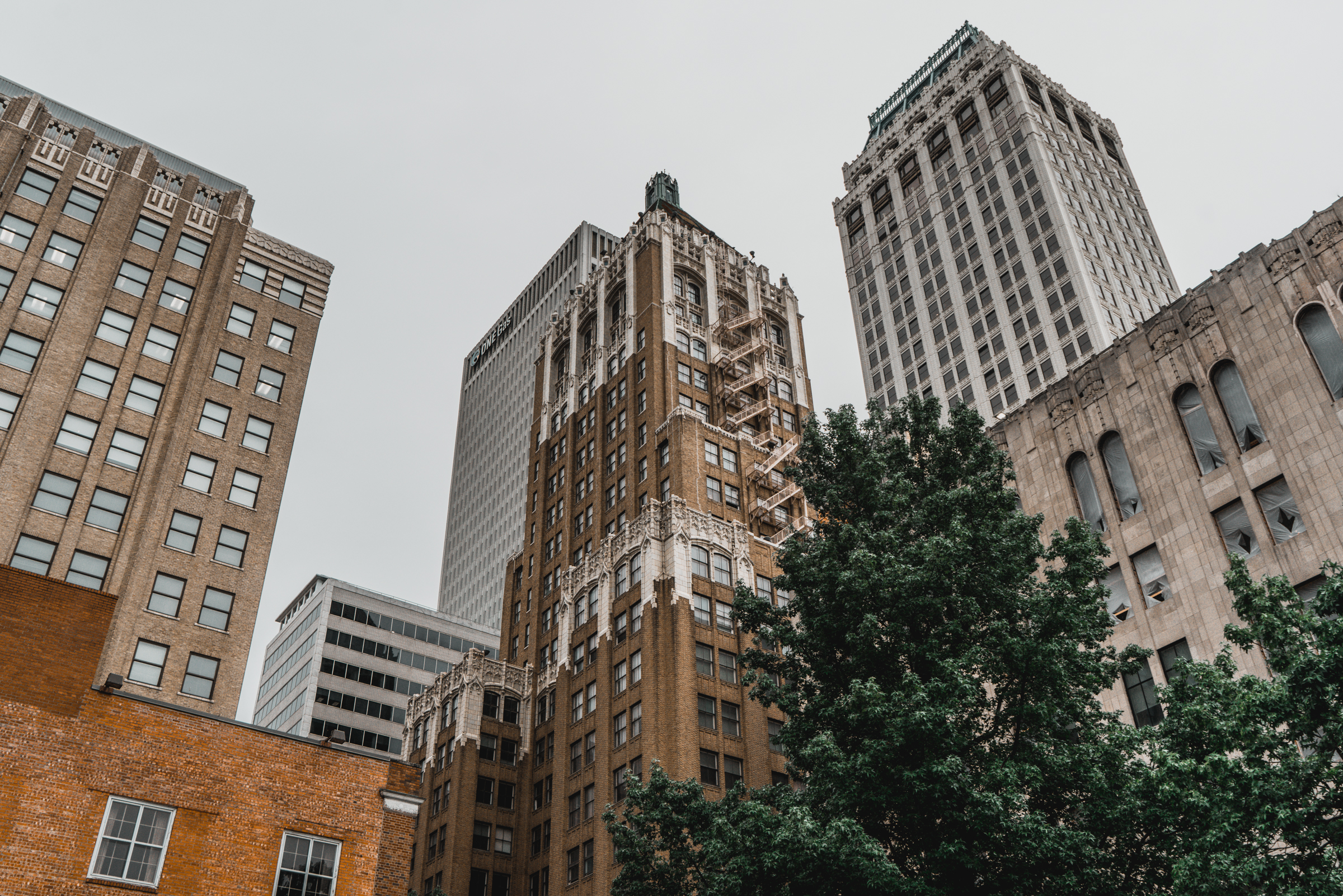
The Philtower, built in the late Gothic Revival style, is surrounded by contemporary office buildings.

A building boom in Tulsa in the early 20th century coincided with the rise of art deco architecture in the United States. Most commonly in the zigzag and streamline styles, the city's art deco is dotted throughout its older neighborhoods, primarily in downtown and midtown. A collection of large art deco structures, such as the Philcade Building, the Boston Avenue Methodist Church, Will Rogers High School, and the Tulsa Union Depot, have attracted events promoting the preservation and architectural interest.

In addition, the city's early prosperity funded the construction of many elegant Craftsmen, Georgian, storybook, Tudor, Greek Revival, Italianate, Spanish revival, and colonial revival homes (many of which can be found in Tulsa's uptown and Midtown neighborhoods). Noted architects and firms working in Tulsa during this period include Charles Dilbeck, John Duncan Forsyth, and Nelle Peters.

Growth in the twentieth century gave the city a larger base of contemporary architectural styles, including several buildings by famed Tulsa architects Bruce Goff and Adah Robinson. The Prairie School was very influential in Tulsa: Barry Byrne designed Tulsa's Christ the King Church and, in 1927, Frank Lloyd Wright's midtown Tulsa residential project Westhope was completed. In particular, the middle of the 20th century brought a wealth of modern architecture to Tulsa. Tulsa's Mies-trained modernist Robert Lawton Jones designed many buildings in the region, including the Tulsa International Airport. Other noted modernists working in Tulsa include the pioneering Texas architect O'Neil Ford and Joseph R. Koberling Jr., who had also been active during the art deco period. South, East, and Midtown Tulsa are home to a number of the ranch and Mid-Century Modern homes that reflect Tulsa's prosperous post-war period.

The BOK Tower, built during this period, is the second tallest building in Oklahoma and the surrounding states of Missouri, New Mexico, Arkansas, and Kansas. Tulsa also has the third-, and fourth-tallest buildings in the state, including the Cityplex Tower, which is located in South Tulsa across from Oral Roberts University, far from downtown. One of the area's unique architectural complexes, Oral Roberts University, is built in a Post-Modern Futuristic style, incorporating bright gold structures with sharp, jetting edges and clear geometric shapes. The BOK Center, Tulsa's new arena, incorporates many of the city's most prominent themes, including Native American, art deco, and contemporary architectural styles. Intended to be an architectural icon, the building was designed by César Pelli, the architect of the Petronas Towers in Malaysia.

==== Neighborhoods ====
Downtown Tulsa is an area of approximately 1.4 square miles (3.6 km^{2}) surrounded by an inner-dispersal loop created by Interstate 244, Highway 64, and Highway 75. The area serves as Tulsa's financial and business district, and is the focus of a large initiative to draw tourism, which includes plans to capitalize on the area's historic architecture. Much of Tulsa's convention space is located in downtown, such as the Tulsa Performing Arts Center, the Arvest Convention Center, and the BOK Center. Prominent downtown neighborhoods include the Oil Capital Historic District, the Blue Dome, the Tulsa Arts district, and Greenwood, the site of ONEOK Field, a baseball stadium for the Tulsa Drillers opened in 2010. Neighborhoods surrounding downtown include Owen Park, The Pearl, The Heights, and Kendall-Whittier.

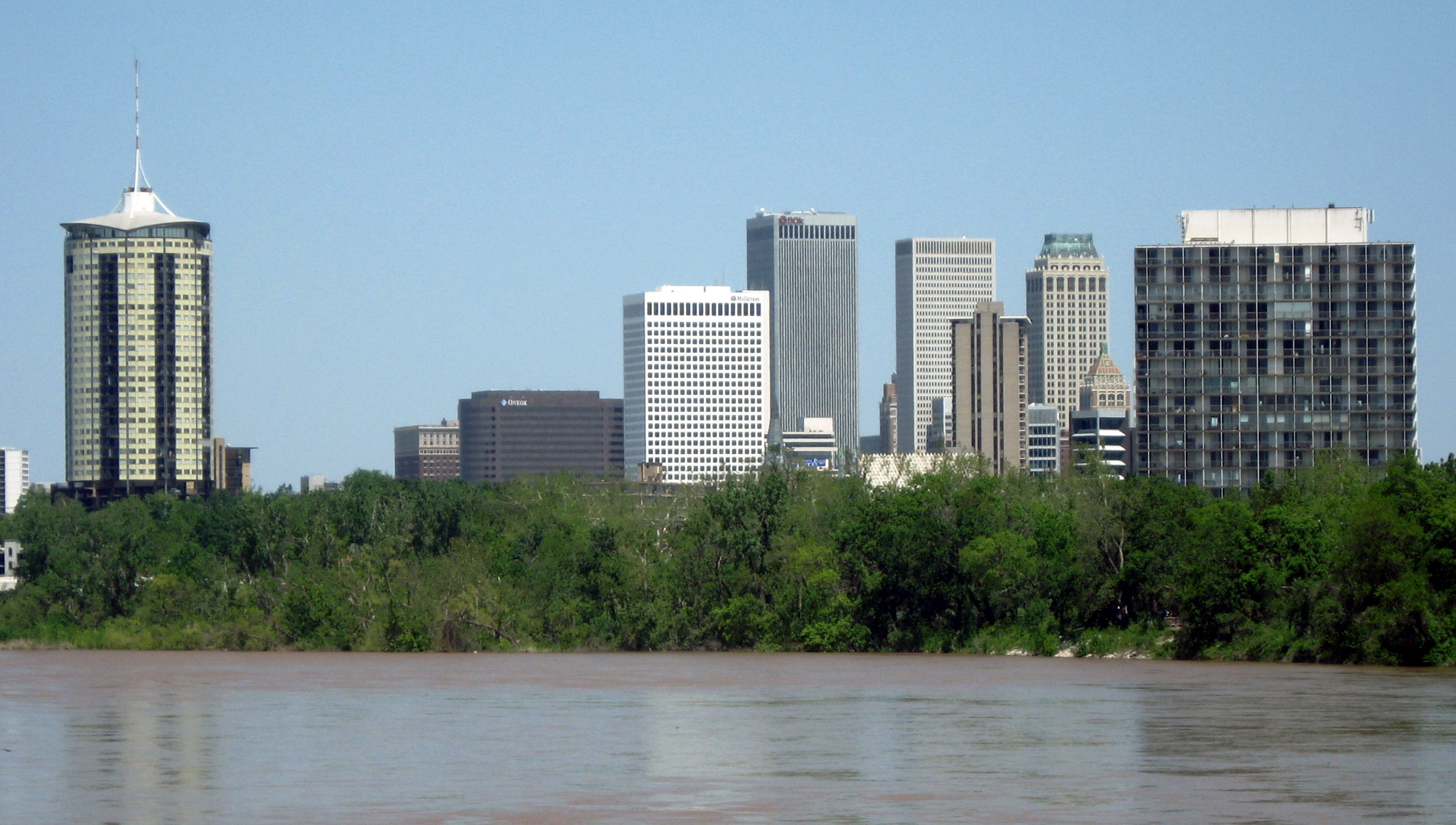
The Arkansas River marks the division between West Tulsa and other regions of the city.

The city's historical residential core lies in an area known as Midtown, containing upscale neighborhoods built in the early 20th century with architecture ranging from art deco to Greek Revival. Midtown includes the neighborhoods of Maple Ridge, Swan Lake, Cherry Street, Brookside and Lortondale. The University of Tulsa, Philbrook Museum, the Gathering Place and Utica Square are located in this region.

A large portion of the city's southern half has developed since the 1970s, containing low-density housing and retail developments. This region, marked by secluded homes and suburban neighborhoods, contains one of the state's largest shopping malls, Woodland Hills Mall, as well as Southern Hills Country Club, and Oral Roberts University. East of Highway 169 and north of 61st street, a diverse racial makeup marks the eastern portions of the city, with large Asian and Mexican communities and much of the city's manufacturing industry.

Areas of Tulsa west of the Arkansas River are called West Tulsa and are marked by large parks, wilderness reserves, and large oil refineries. The northern tier of the city is home to OSU-Tulsa, Gilcrease Museum, Tulsa International Airport, the Tulsa Zoo, the Tulsa Air and Space Museum, and the nation's third-largest municipal park, Mohawk Park.

=== Climate ===
Climate chart for Tulsa

Tulsa has a temperate climate of the humid subtropical variety (Köppen: Cfa) with a yearly average temperature of 61.3 °F (16.3 °C) and average precipitation of just under 41 inches (1,000 mm) per year. Average monthly precipitation is lowest from December to February, and peaks dramatically in May, which averages 5.9 inches (150 mm) of rainfall. Early June can still be wet, but late June through the end of August is frequently dry. On average, Tulsa experiences a secondary rainfall peak in September and early October. As is typical of temperate zones, weather patterns vary by season with occasional extremes in temperature and rainfall.

Primarily in the spring and early summer months, the city is subjected to severe thunderstorms containing large hail, damaging winds, and, occasionally, tornadoes, providing the area with a disproportionate share of its annual rainfall. Severe weather is not limited to this season, however. For instance, on December 5, 1975, and on December 24, 1982, Tulsa experienced tornadoes. Due to its potential for major flooding events, the city has developed one of the most extensive flood control systems in the nation. A comprehensive flood management plan was developed in 1984 following a severe flood caused by a stalled weather front that dropped 15 in (380 mm) of rain overnight, killing 14, injuring 288, and destroying 7,000 buildings totaling $180 million in damage. In the early 1990s and again in 2000, the Federal Emergency Management Agency honored Tulsa as leading the nation in flood plain management. Triple-digit temperatures (>100 °F (38 °C)) are observed on average 11 days per year, most of which occur from July to early September, and are usually accompanied by high humidity brought in by southerly winds. The highest recorded temperature was 115 °F (46 °C) on August 10, 1936. Lack of air circulation due to heat and humidity during the summer months leads to higher concentrations of ozone, prompting the city to release "Ozone Alerts", encouraging all parties to do their part in complying with the Clean Air Act and United States Environmental Protection Agency standards. The autumn season is usually short, consisting of pleasant, sunny days followed by cool nights. Winter temperatures, while generally mild, dip below 10 °F (−12 °C) on average three nights per year, and occasionally below 0 °F (−18 °C), the most recent such occurrence being a −2 °F (−19 °C) reading on January 16, 2024. The average seasonal snowfall is 8.7 inches (22.1 cm) with the record highest seasonal snowfall of 26.1 inches (66.3 cm) occurring in the winter of 2010–2011. Only three winters on record have officially recorded trace amounts or no snowfall, the most recent being 1910–11. The lowest recorded temperature was −16 °F (−27 °C) on January 22, 1930.

Climate data for Tulsa, Oklahoma (Tulsa Int'l), 1991–2020 normals, extremes 1893–present (Note: Official records for Tulsa kept August 1893 to December 1930 at downtown and at Tulsa Int'l since January 1931. For more information, see Threadex.)
Month	Jan	Feb	Mar	Apr	May	Jun	Jul	Aug	Sep	Oct	Nov	Dec	Year
Record high °F (°C)	82 (28)	90 (32)	99 (37)	102 (39)	100 (38)	108 (42)	113 (45)	115 (46)	109 (43)	98 (37)	89 (32)	86 (30)	115 (46)
Mean maximum °F (°C)	70.1 (21.2)	74.9 (23.8)	83.4 (28.6)	86.8 (30.4)	91.3 (32.9)	95.4 (35.2)	101.9 (38.8)	102.2 (39.0)	96.2 (35.7)	88.2 (31.2)	79.0 (26.1)	70.1 (21.2)	103.9 (39.9)
Mean daily maximum °F (°C)	48.9 (9.4)	54.0 (12.2)	63.3 (17.4)	72.1 (22.3)	79.7 (26.5)	88.4 (31.3)	93.6 (34.2)	93.0 (33.9)	84.8 (29.3)	73.6 (23.1)	61.4 (16.3)	50.9 (10.5)	72.0 (22.2)
Daily mean °F (°C)	38.5 (3.6)	42.8 (6.0)	52.0 (11.1)	60.8 (16.0)	69.6 (20.9)	78.6 (25.9)	83.4 (28.6)	82.2 (27.9)	73.8 (23.2)	62.3 (16.8)	50.4 (10.2)	41.0 (5.0)	61.3 (16.3)
Mean daily minimum °F (°C)	28.0 (−2.2)	31.7 (−0.2)	40.7 (4.8)	49.5 (9.7)	59.5 (15.3)	68.7 (20.4)	73.1 (22.8)	71.5 (21.9)	62.8 (17.1)	50.9 (10.5)	39.4 (4.1)	31.1 (−0.5)	50.6 (10.3)
Mean minimum °F (°C)	10.4 (−12.0)	13.5 (−10.3)	22.9 (−5.1)	33.5 (0.8)	44.8 (7.1)	56.4 (13.6)	63.4 (17.4)	60.5 (15.8)	46.0 (7.8)	34.5 (1.4)	23.4 (−4.8)	12.6 (−10.8)	4.6 (−15.2)
Record low °F (°C)	−16 (−27)	−15 (−26)	−3 (−19)	22 (−6)	32 (0)	49 (9)	51 (11)	48 (9)	35 (2)	15 (−9)	10 (−12)	−8 (−22)	−16 (−27)
Average precipitation inches (mm)	1.63 (41)	1.62 (41)	3.10 (79)	4.37 (111)	5.73 (146)	4.65 (118)	3.76 (96)	3.38 (86)	3.85 (98)	3.78 (96)	2.66 (68)	2.43 (62)	40.96 (1,042)
Average snowfall inches (cm)	1.9 (4.8)	2.4 (6.1)	1.9 (4.8)	0.0 (0.0)	0.0 (0.0)	0.0 (0.0)	0.0 (0.0)	0.0 (0.0)	0.0 (0.0)	0.0 (0.0)	0.8 (2.0)	1.7 (4.3)	8.7 (22)
Average precipitation days (≥ 0.01 in)	6.0	6.6	8.6	9.1	11.1	9.1	7.3	6.9	7.8	8.4	6.7	6.7	94.3
Average snowy days (≥ 0.1 in)	1.8	1.3	0.6	0.1	0.0	0.0	0.0	0.0	0.0	0.0	0.4	1.2	5.4
Average relative humidity (%)	66.7	65.2	61.6	61.2	69.1	69.3	63.6	64.5	70.1	66.4	67.4	68.5	66.1
Average dew point °F (°C)	23.5 (−4.7)	27.7 (−2.4)	35.6 (2.0)	45.9 (7.7)	57.4 (14.1)	65.7 (18.7)	67.8 (19.9)	66.6 (19.2)	61.2 (16.2)	48.7 (9.3)	37.8 (3.2)	27.9 (−2.3)	47.2 (8.4)
Mean monthly sunshine hours	175.8	171.7	219.6	244.4	266.7	294.8	334.7	305.3	232.5	218.6	161.1	160.8	2,786
Percentage possible sunshine	57	56	59	62	61	67	75	73	63	63	52	53	63
Source: NOAA (relative humidity, dew point and sun 1961–1990)

=== August 6, 2017 tornado ===
An EF2 tornado struck Tulsa early on the morning of Sunday, August 6, 2017. The funnel touched down just after 1 A.M. near 36th Street and Harvard Avenue, then traveled in an easterly direction for about six minutes. The heaviest property damage occurred along 41st Street between Yale Avenue and Sheridan Road. Two restaurants, TGI Friday's and Whataburger, were particularly hard hit, with several people being sent to hospitals for treatment. The Whataburger was later bulldozed, and rebuilt in 2019.

== Demographics ==
Historical population
Census	Pop.	Note	%±
1900	1,390		—
1910	18,182		1,208.1%
1920	72,075		296.4%
1930	141,258		96.0%
1940	142,157		0.6%
1950	182,740		28.5%
1960	261,685		43.2%
1970	331,638		26.7%
1980	360,919		8.8%
1990	367,302		1.8%
2000	393,049		7.0%
2010	391,906		−0.3%
2020	413,066		5.4%
2024 (est.)	415,154		0.5%
U.S. Decennial Census

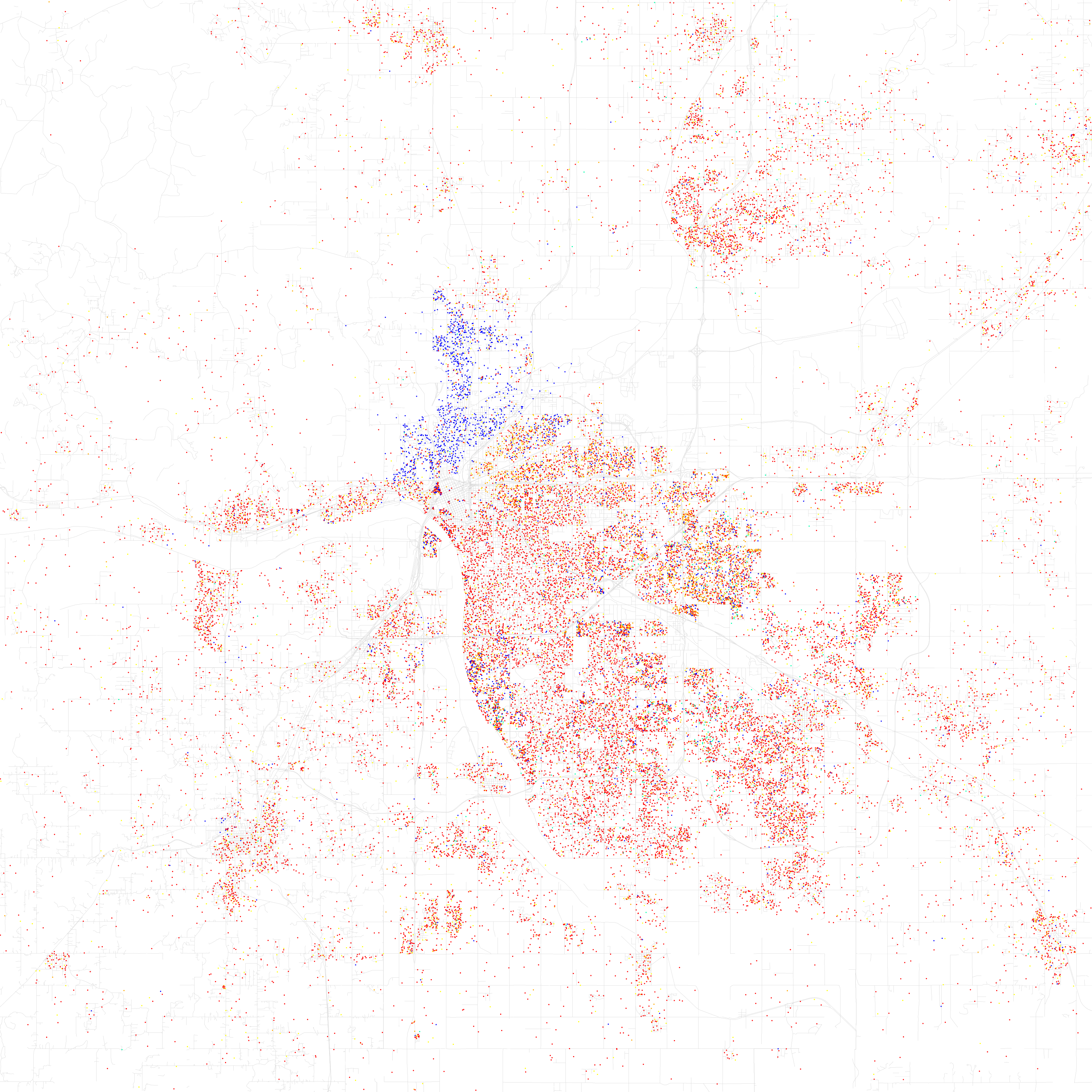
Map of racial distribution in Tulsa, 2010 U.S. Census. Each dot is 25 people: ⬤ White ⬤ Black ⬤ Asian ⬤ Hispanic ⬤ Other

=== Racial and ethnic composition ===
Tulsa, Oklahoma – racial and ethnic composition Note: the US Census treats Hispanic/Latino as an ethnic category. This table excludes Latinos from the racial categories and assigns them to a separate category. Hispanics/Latinos may be of any race.
Race / ethnicity (NH = Non-Hispanic)	Pop 2000	Pop 2010	Pop 2020	% 2000	% 2010	% 2020
White alone (NH)	263,782	227,021	200,257	67.11%	57.93%	48.48%
Black or African American alone (NH)	60,297	61,230	60,505	15.34%	15.62%	14.65%
Native American or Alaska Native alone (NH)	18,005	19,473	18,975	4.58%	4.97%	4.59%
Asian alone (NH)	7,096	8,926	14,157	1.81%	2.28%	3.43%
Native Hawaiian or Pacific Islander alone (NH)	165	278	857	0.04%	0.07%	0.21%
Other race alone (NH)	458	473	1,548	0.12%	0.12%	0.37%
Mixed-race or multiracial (NH)	15,135	19,239	37,710	3.85%	4.91%	9.13%
Hispanic or Latino (any race)	28,111	55,266	79,057	7.15%	14.10%	19.14%
Total	393,049	391,906	413,066	100.00%	100.00%	100.00%

=== 2020 census ===
As of the 2020 census, Tulsa had a population of 413,066. The median age was 35.8 years. 23.4% of residents were under the age of 18 and 15.3% of residents were 65 years of age or older. For every 100 females there were 95.5 males, and for every 100 females age 18 and over there were 93.0 males age 18 and over.

99.3% of residents lived in urban areas, while 0.7% lived in rural areas.

There were 171,638 households in Tulsa, of which 28.2% had children under the age of 18 living in them. Of all households, 36.3% were married-couple households, 23.3% were households with a male householder and no spouse or partner present, and 32.9% were households with a female householder and no spouse or partner present. About 35.4% of all households were made up of individuals and 12.1% had someone living alone who was 65 years of age or older.

There were 191,364 housing units, of which 10.3% were vacant. Among occupied housing units, 49.9% were owner-occupied and 50.1% were renter-occupied. The homeowner vacancy rate was 2.0% and the rental vacancy rate was 10.9%.

Racial composition as of the 2020 census
Race	Percent
White	51.8%
Black or African American	14.9%
American Indian and Alaska Native	5.2%
Asian	3.5%
Native Hawaiian and Other Pacific Islander	0.2%
Some other race	9.8%
Two or more races	14.6%
Hispanic or Latino (of any race)	19.1%

The most reported ancestries in 2020 were:

- English (15.4%)
- Mexican (14.3%)
- German (11.6%)
- Irish (11.1%)
- African American (10.4%)
- Cherokee (4.8%)
- Scottish (3.1%)
- Italian (1.9%)
- French (1.9%)
- The Muscogee (Creek) Nation (1.8%)

=== 2010 census ===
According to the 2010 census, Tulsa had a population of 391,906 and the racial and ethnic composition was as follows: White American: 62.6% (57.9% Non-Hispanic Whites); Black, 15.6%; Hispanic or Latino (of any race), 14.1% (11.5% Mexican, 0.4% Puerto Rican, 0.3% Guatemalan, 0.2% Spanish, 0.2% Honduran, 0.2% Salvadoran); some other race, 8.0%; Two or more races, 5.9%; Native American, 5.3%; Asian American, 2.3% (0.5% Hmong, 0.4% Vietnamese, 0.3% Chinese, 0.2% Indian, 0.2% Korean, 0.2% Burmese); and Native Hawaiian and Other Pacific Islander: 0.1%. In the 2020 census, its population increased to 413,066.

As of the 2010 census, there were 391,906 people, 163,975 households, and 95,246 families residing in the city, with a population density of 2,033.4 inhabitants per square mile (785.1/km^{2}) There were 185,127 housing units at an average density of 982.3 per square mile (379.3/km^{2}). Of 163,975 households, 27% had children under the age of 18 living with them, 38.2% were married couples living together, 14.6% had a female householder with no husband present, and 41.9% were non-families. Of all households, 34.5% are made up of only one person, and 10% had someone living alone who was 65 years of age or older. The average household size was 2.34 people and the average family size was 3.04.

In the city proper, the age distribution was 24.8% of the population under the age of 18, 10.9% from 18 to 24, 29.9% from 25 to 44, 21.5% from 45 to 64, and 12.9% who were 65 years of age or older, while the median age was 34 years. For every 100 females, there were 93.5 males, while for every 100 females over the age of 17 there were 90.4 males. In 2011, the median income for a household in the city was $40,268 and the median income for a family was $51,977. The per capita income for the city was $26,727. About 19.4% of the population were below the poverty line. Of the city's population over the age of 25, 29.8% holds a bachelor's degree or higher, and 86.5% have a high school diploma or equivalent.

=== Metropolitan area ===
The Tulsa MSA's location (red) in the state of Oklahoma with the Tulsa-Bartlesville CSA (pink)

The Tulsa metropolitan area, or the region immediately surrounding Tulsa with strong social and economic ties to the city, occupies a large portion of the state's northeastern quadrant. It is informally known as "Green Country", a longstanding name adopted by the state's official tourism designation for all of northeastern Oklahoma (its usage concerning the Tulsa Metropolitan Area can be traced to the early part of the 20th century).

The U.S. Census Bureau defines the sphere of the city's influence as the Tulsa metropolitan statistical area (MSA), spanning seven counties: Tulsa, Rogers, Osage, Wagoner, Okmulgee, Pawnee, and Creek. The 2020 U.S. census shows the Tulsa MSA to have 1,015,331 residents The 2020 U.S. census shows the Tulsa-Muscogee-Bartlesville CSA to have 1,134,125 residents.

=== Religion ===
Tulsa has a large conservative following, with the majority of Tulsans being Christians. The second-largest religion in Tulsa is Islam, followed by Buddhism and Judaism.

Tulsa is part of the Southern region demographers and commentators refer to as the "Bible Belt", where Protestant and, in particular, Southern Baptist and other evangelical Christian traditions are very prominent. In fact, Tulsa, home to Oral Roberts University, Phillips Theological Seminary, and RHEMA Bible Training College (in the suburb of Broken Arrow), is sometimes called the "buckle of the Bible Belt". Tulsa is also home to a number of vibrant Mainline Protestant congregations. Some of these congregations were founded during the oil boom of the early twentieth century and are noted for striking architecture, such as the art deco Boston Avenue Methodist Church and First Presbyterian Church of Tulsa. The metropolitan area has at least four religious radio stations (KCFO, KNYD, KXOJ, & KPIM), and at least two religious TV stations (KWHB & KGEB).

While the state of Oklahoma has fewer Roman Catholics than the national average, Holy Family Cathedral serves as the Cathedral for the Diocese of Tulsa.

Tulsa is also home to the largest Jewish community in Oklahoma, with active Reform, Conservative and Orthodox congregations. Tulsa's Sherwin Miller Museum of Jewish Art offers the largest collection of Judaica in the South-Central and Southwestern United States.

Tulsa is also home to the progressive All Souls Unitarian Church, reportedly the largest Unitarian Universalist congregation in the United States.

Chùa Tam Bào (Vietnamese: "Three Jewels Temple"), then Oklahoma's only Buddhist temple, was established in east Tulsa in 1993 by Vietnamese refugees. A 57-foot-tall (17 m) granite statue of Quan Âm (commonly known by her Chinese name, Guanyin) is located in the grounds.

=== Crime rate ===
Tulsa
- Crime rates* (2017)

Violent crimes
- Homicide: 17.29
- Rape: 104.48
- Robbery: 238.10
- Aggravated assault: 680.96
- Total violent crime: 1,040.83

Property crimes
- Burglary: 1,376.75
- Larceny-theft: 3,224.26
- Motor vehicle theft: 854.60
- Arson: 35.57
- Total property crime: 5,455.61
- Note: Reported crimes per 100,000 population Source: 2017 FBI UCR Data

Tulsa experienced elevated levels of gang violence in the late 1980s and early 1990s, when crack cocaine flooded neighborhoods in North Tulsa. Tulsa gang problems became noticeable after an outbreak of gang-related crime between 1980 and 1983, which was traced to the Crips, a local gang which had been founded by two brothers whose family had recently moved to Oklahoma from Compton. In 1986, gang graffiti started to show up on walls and drive-by shootings started occurring on late nights. In 1990 the city hit a record of 60 homicides, the highest since the 1981 peak. North Tulsa has the highest crime rate in the city, with public housing projects being the most heavily affected areas., the Broken Arrow murders took place on July 22, 2015, when five members of the Bever family were murdered in Broken Arrow, Oklahoma. the attackers were identified as 18 year-old Robert Bever and 16 year-old Michael Bever. On June 1, 2022, a mass shooting occurred in a medical center, killing at least 4 people, including the perpetrator.

== Economy ==
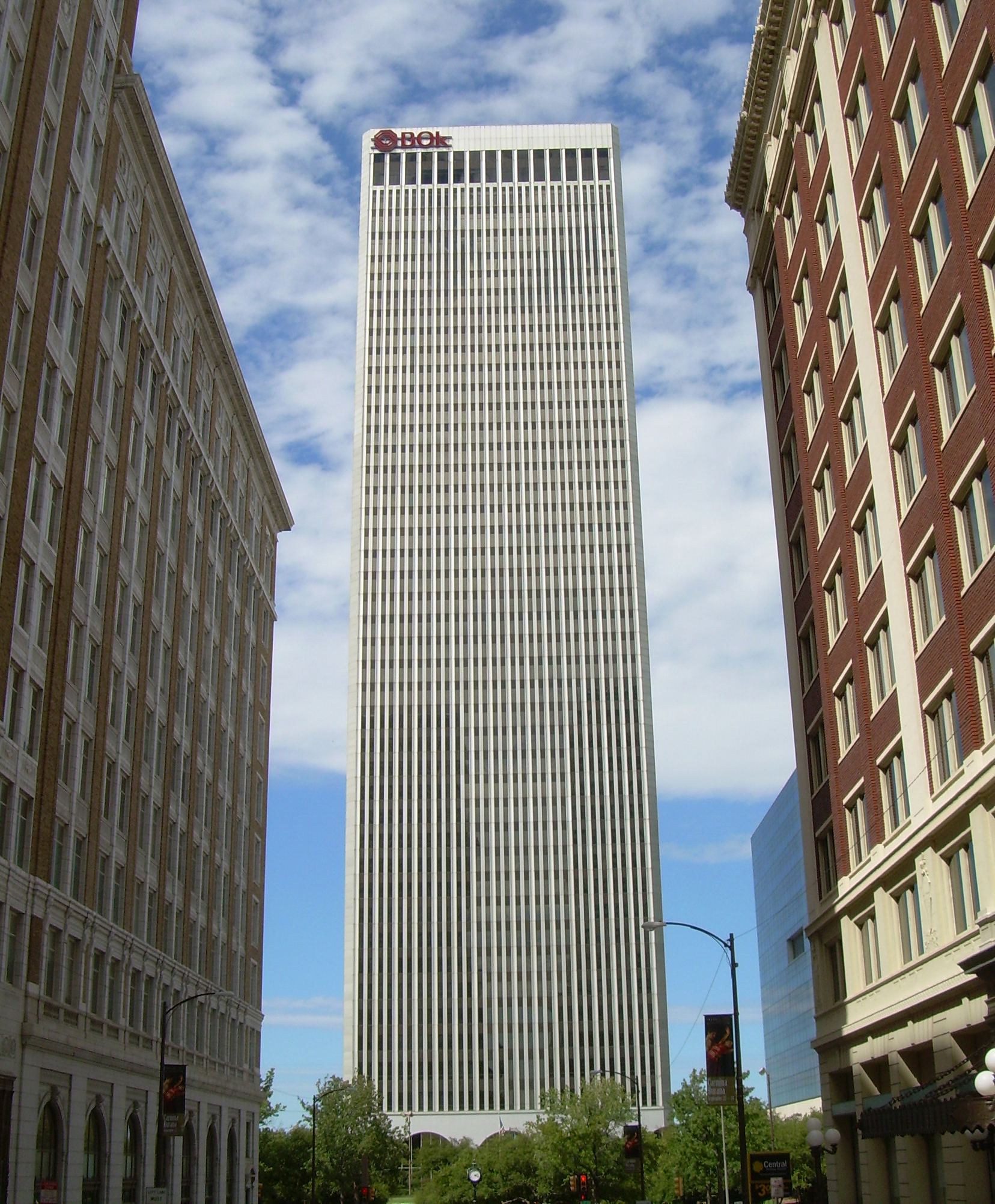
The BOK Tower serves as the world headquarters for Williams Companies.

=== Energy industry's legacy and resurgence ===
The United States Oil and Gas Association was founded in Tulsa on October 13, 1917. Over the city's history many large oil companies have been headquartered in the city, including Warren Petroleum (which merged with Gulf Oil in what was then the largest merger in the energy industry), Skelly Oil, Getty Oil and CITGO. In addition, ConocoPhillips was headquartered in nearby Bartlesville. Industry consolidation and increased offshore drilling threatened Tulsa's status as an oil capital, but new drilling techniques and the rise of natural gas have buoyed the growth of the city's energy sector.

Today, Tulsa is again home to the headquarters of many international oil- and gas-related companies, including Williams Companies, ONE Gas, Syntroleum, ONEOK, Laredo Petroleum, Samson Resources, Helmerich & Payne, Magellan Midstream Partners, and Excel Energy.

=== Diversification and emerging industries ===
Tulsa has diversified to capitalize on its status as a regional hub with substantial innovation assets. Products from Tulsa manufacturers account for about sixty percent of Oklahoma's exports, and in 2001, the city's total gross product was in the top one-third of metropolitan areas, states, and countries, with more than $29 billion in total goods, growing at a rate of $250 million each year.

Tulsa's primary employers are small and medium-sized businesses: there are 30 companies in Tulsa that employ more than 1,000 people locally, and small businesses make up more than 80% of the city's companies.

During a national recession from 2001 to 2003, the city lost 28,000 jobs. In response, a development initiative, Vision 2025, promised to incite economic growth and recreate lost jobs. Projects spurred by the initiative promised urban revitalization, infrastructure improvement, tourism development, riverfront retail development, and further diversification of the economy. By 2007, employment levels had surpassed pre-recession heights and the city was in a significant economic development and investment surge. This economic improvement is also seen in Tulsa's housing trends which show an average of a 6% increase in rent in 2010. Since 2006, more than 28,000 jobs have been added to the city. The unemployment rate of Tulsa in August 2014 was 4.5%.

Though the oil industry has historically dominated Tulsa's economy, efforts in economic diversification have created a base in the sectors of aerospace, finance, technology, telecommunications, high tech, and manufacturing. A number of substantial financial corporations are headquartered in Tulsa, the largest being the BOK Financial Corporation. Among these financial services firms are energy trading operations, asset management firms, investment funds, and a range of commercial banks. The national convenience store chain QuikTrip, fast-casual restaurant chain Camille's Sidewalk Cafe, and pizza chain Mazzio's are all headquartered in Tulsa, as is Southern regional BBQ restaurant Rib Crib. Tulsa is also home to the Marshall Brewing Company.

Tulsa is also home to media industry, including PennWell, consumer review website ConsumerAffairs, Stephens Media Group, This Land Press, Educational Development Corporation (the parent publisher of Kane/Miller), GEB America, Blooming Twig Books, and a full range of local media outlets, including Tulsa World and local magazines, radio and television. Tulsa is also a hub for national construction and engineering companies including Manhattan Construction Company and Flintco. A number of the Cherokee Nation Businesses are also headquartered or have substantial operations in Tulsa.

Tulsa's aerospace industry is substantial and growing. An American Airlines maintenance base at Tulsa International Airport is the city's largest employer and the largest maintenance facility in the world, serving as the airline's global maintenance and engineering headquarters. American Airlines announced in February, 2020 that it will pour $550 million over seven years into its maintenance base, this being the largest single economic development investment in city history. The Tulsa Port of Catoosa and the Tulsa International Airport house extensive transit-focused industrial parks. Tulsa is also home to a division of Lufthansa, the headquarters of Omni Air International, and the Spartan College of Aeronautics and Technology.

Tulsa is also part of the Oklahoma-South Kansas Unmanned Aerial Systems (drone) industry cluster, a region which awarded funding by the U.S. Small Business Administration to build on its progress as a hub this emerging industry.

As the second largest metropolitan area in Oklahoma and a hub for the growing Northeastern Oklahoma-Northwest Arkansas-Southwestern Missouri corridor, the city is also home to a number of law, accounting, and medical practices. Its location in the center of the nation also makes it a hub for logistics businesses; the Tulsa International Airport (TUL) and the Tulsa Port of Catoosa, connect the region with international trade and transportation.

Amazon recently announced plans to build a more than 600,000-square-foot fulfillment center near Tulsa International Airport. The company will invest an estimated $130 million for this state-of-the-art facility, which will employ around 1,500 people with an annual payroll of roughly $50 million.

== Arts and culture ==
Tulsa culture is influenced by the nearby Southwest, Midwest, and Southern cultural regions, as well as a historical Native American presence. These influences are expressed in the city's museums, cultural centers, performing arts venues, ethnic festivals, park systems, zoos, wildlife preserves, and large and growing collections of public sculptures, monuments, and artwork.

=== Museums, archives and visual culture ===
Tulsa is home to several museums. Located in the former villa of oil pioneer Waite Phillips in Midtown Tulsa, the Philbrook Museum of Art is considered one of the top 50 fine art museums in the United States and is one of only five to offer a combination of a historic home, formal gardens, and an art collection. The museum's expansive collection includes work by a diverse group of artists including Pablo Picasso, Andrew Wyeth, Giovanni Bellini, Domenico di Pace Beccafumi, Willem de Kooning, William Merritt Chase, Auguste Rodin and Georgia O'Keeffe.

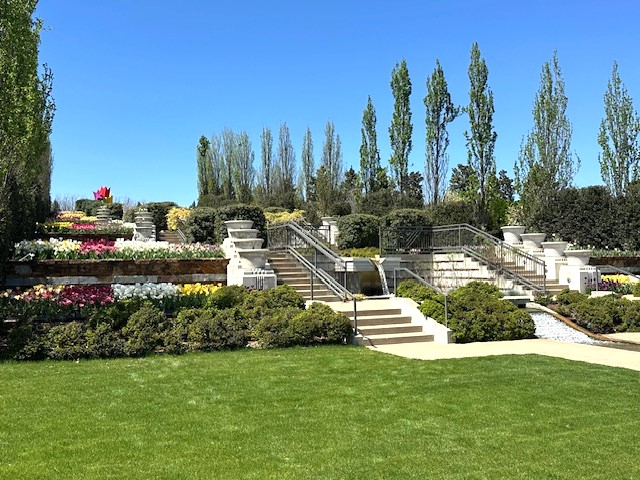
The central staircase up the Tandy Floral Terraces at Tulsa Botanic Garden, April 2025

In the Osage Hills of Northwest Tulsa, the Gilcrease Museum holds the world's largest, most comprehensive collection of art and artifacts of the American West. The museum includes the extensive collection of Native American oilman and famed art collector Thomas Gilcrease with numerous works by Frederic Remington, Thomas Moran, Albert Bierstadt and John James Audubon among the many displayed.

The 170-acre Tulsa Botanic Garden is a public flower garden and arboretum with art works and water features, also dedicated to preserving the native environment of the Cross Timbers forest and prairie.

On the west bank of the Arkansas River in the suburb of Jenks, the Oklahoma Aquarium is the state's only freestanding aquarium, containing over 200 exhibits, including a shark tank.

In addition, the city hosts a number of galleries, experimental art-spaces, smaller museums, and display spaces located throughout the city (clustered mostly in downtown, Brookside, and the Pearl District). Living Arts of Tulsa, in downtown Tulsa, is among the organizations dedicated to promoting and sustaining an active arts scene in the city.

==== Cultural and historical archives ====
Opened in April 2013, the Woody Guthrie Center in the Tulsa Arts District is Tulsa's newest museum and archive. In addition to interactive state-of-the-art museum displays, the Woody Guthrie Center also houses the Woody Guthrie Archives, containing thousands of Guthrie's personal items, sheet music, manuscripts, books, photos, periodicals, and other items associated with the iconic Oklahoma native. The archives of Guthrie-protégé, singer-songwriter Bob Dylan are also displayed at the Bob Dylan Center which opened May 10, 2022 and houses The Bob Dylan Archive.

The Church Studio is a recording studio and tourist attraction with an archive of more than 5,000 pieces. Constructed in 1915, the church was listed on the National Register of Historic Places due to musician Leon Russell, who turned the old church into a recording studio and office for Shelter Records in 1972.

With remnants of the Holocaust and artifacts relevant to Judaism in Oklahoma, the Sherwin Miller Museum of Jewish Art preserves the largest collection of Judaica in the Southwestern and South-Central United States. Other museums, such as the Museum of Tulsa History, the Tulsa Air and Space Museum & Planetarium, the Oklahoma Jazz Hall of Fame, and the Tulsa Geosciences Center, document histories of the region, while the Greenwood Cultural Center preserves the culture of the city's African American heritage, housing a collection of artifacts and photography that document the history of the Black Wall Street before the Tulsa Race Massacre of 1921.

=== Public art ===
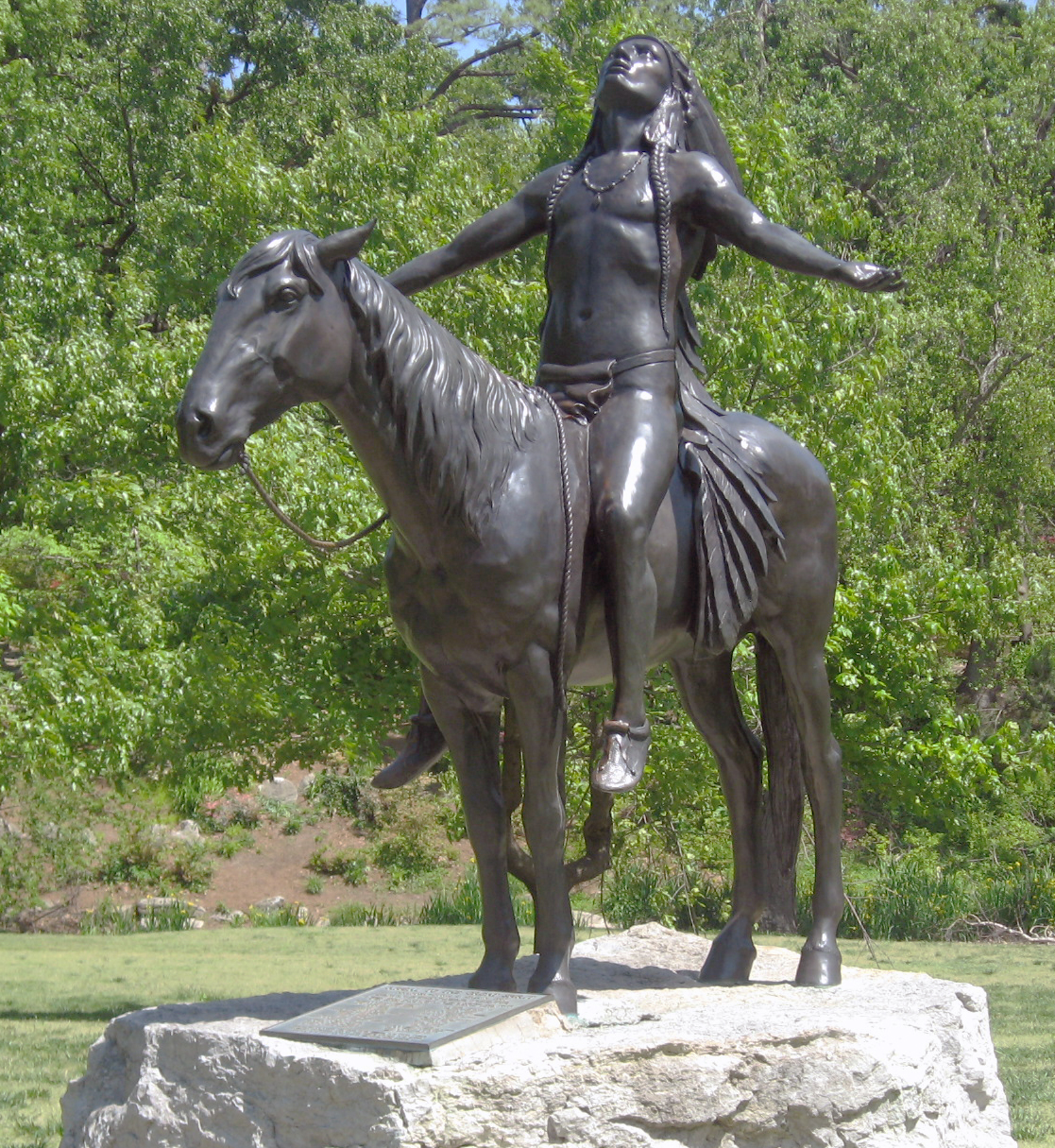
Cyrus Dallin's Appeal to the Great Spirit in Woodward Park

Since 1969, public displays of artwork in Tulsa have been funded by one percent of its annual city budget. Each year, a sculpture from a local artist is installed along the Arkansas River trail system, while other sculptures stand at local parks, such as an enlarged version of Cyrus Dallin's Appeal to the Great Spirit sculpture at Woodward Park. At the entrance to Oral Roberts University stands the Praying Hands, which, at 60 feet (18 m) high, is the largest bronze sculpture in the world. As a testament to the city's oil heritage, the 76-foot (23 m) Golden Driller guards the front entrance to the Tulsa County Fairgrounds. Tulsa has a number of exhibits related to U.S. Route 66, including The Cyrus Avery Centennial Plaza, located next to the east entrance of the historic 11th Street Bridge. The Plaza contains a giant sculpture weighing 20,000 pounds (9,100 kg) and costing $1.178 million called "East Meets West" of the Avery family riding west in a Ford Model T meeting an eastbound horse-drawn carriage. At the west end of the bridge, Avery Plaza Southwest, includes replicas of three prominent neon signs from Tulsa-area Route 66 motels from the era, being the Will Rogers Motor Court, Tulsa Auto Court, and the Oil Capital Motel. Tulsa has also installed "Route 66 Rising", a 70 by 30 ft (21 by 9 m) sculpture on the road's eastern approach to town at East Admiral Place and Mingo Road. In addition, Tulsa has constructed twenty-nine historical markers scattered along the 26-mile (42 km) route of the highway through Tulsa, containing tourist-oriented stories, historical photos, and a map showing the location of historical sites and the other markers. The markers are mostly along the highway's post-1932 alignment down 11th Street, with some along the road's 1926 path down Admiral Place.

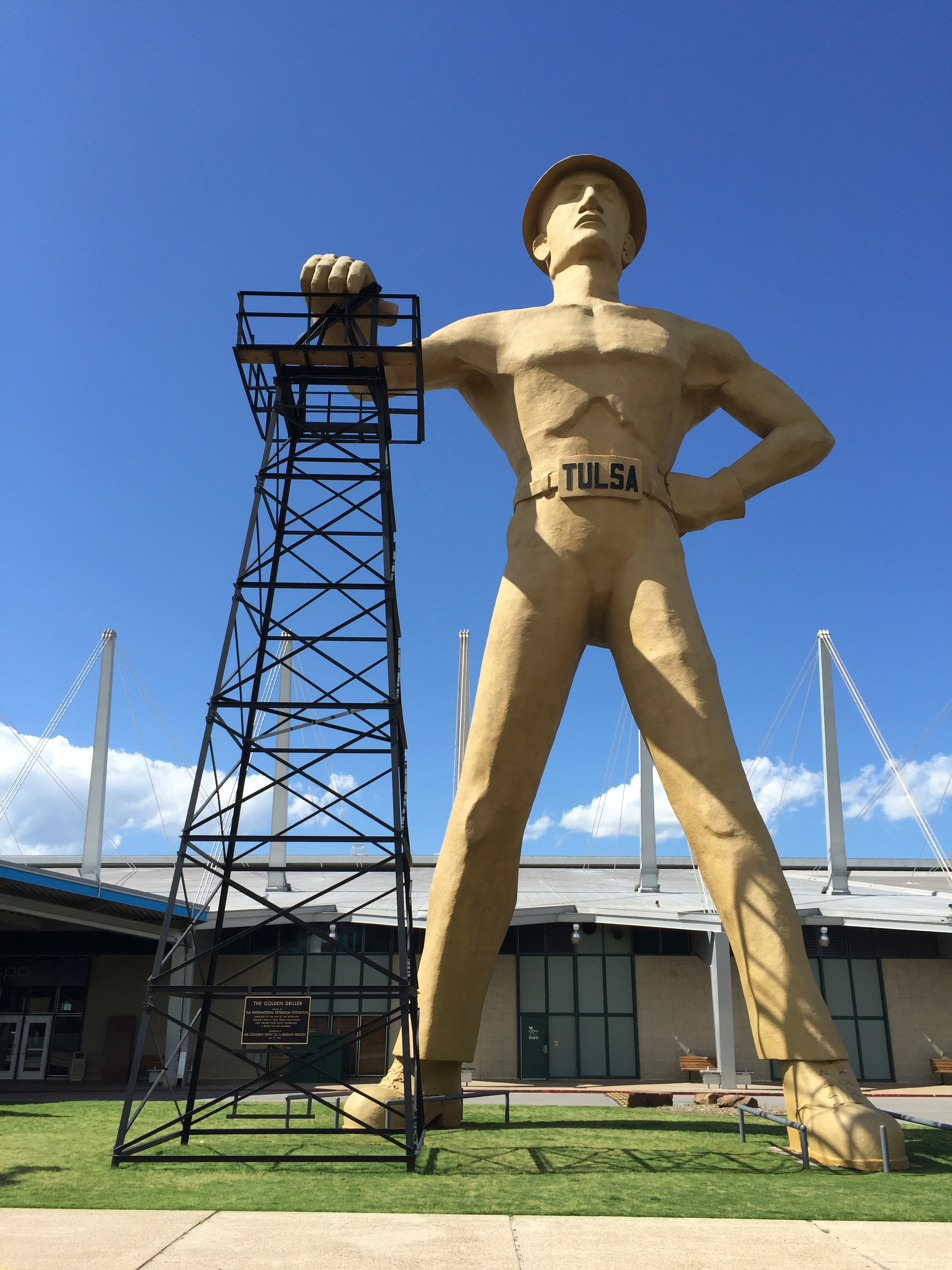
The iconic Golden Driller, built in 1953 for the 1953 International Petroleum Exposition, now stands at the Tulsa County Fairgrounds.

The largest augmented reality mural in the world, "The Majestic", a 15,000-square-foot (1,400 m^{2}) work which adorns two sides of the Main Park Plaza at 410 S. Main downtown, was completed in October 2021. The $230,000 project was created by Los Angeles-based artists Ryan "Yanoe" Sarfati and Eric "Zoueh" Skotnes. The mural becomes animated when viewed through a smartphone camera.

=== Flag ===
The flag of Tulsa is considered one of the most attractive city flags in the United States. In 2023, it became one of two city flags to receive an A+ rating from the North American Vexillological Association.

The Tulsa City Council voted to adopt the new city flag in 2018 following a campaign from local community. The design incorporates an Osage shield to represent the Tulsa settlement under the Council Oak Tree. The color red is meant to represent the people who died in the Tulsa race massacre, the color blue represents the Arkansas River, the gold represents the discovery of "black gold", or oil.

=== Performing arts, film and cultural venues ===
Tulsa contains several permanent dance, theater, and concert groups, including the Tulsa Ballet, the Tulsa Opera, the Tulsa Symphony Orchestra, Light Opera Oklahoma, Signature Symphony at TCC, the Tulsa Youth Symphony, the Heller Theatre, American Theatre Company, which is a member of the Theatre Communications Group and Oklahoma's oldest resident professional theatre, and Theatre Tulsa, the oldest continuously operating community theatre company west of the Mississippi River. Tulsa also houses the Tulsa Spotlight Theater at Riverside Studio, which shows the longest-running play in America (The Drunkard) every Saturday night. Many of the world's best choreographers have worked with Tulsa Ballet including: Leonide Massine, Antony Tudor, Jerome Robbins, George Balanchine, Paul Taylor, Kurt Jooss, Nacho Duato (ten works), Val Caniparoli who is its resident choreographer (with seven works and four world premieres), Stanton Welch, Young Soon Hue, Ma Cong, Twyla Tharp and many others. In April 2008, Tulsa Ballet completed an ambitious $17.3 million integrated campaign, which was celebrated at the opening of the brand new Studio K, an on-site, three-hundred-seat performance space dedicated to the creation of new works.

Several concert venues, dance halls, and bars gave rise to the Tulsa music scene, most notably Cain's Ballroom, a world-renowned concert venue considered the birthplace of Western Swing, housed the performance headquarters of Bob Wills and the Texas Playboys during the 1930s. The centerpiece of the downtown Brady Arts District, the Brady Theater, is the largest of the city's five operating performing arts venues that are listed on the National Register of Historic Places. Its design features extensive contributions by American architect Bruce Goff.

Tulsa Sound is a musical genre that blends rockabilly, country, rock 'n' roll, and blues and has inspired local artists like J.J. Cale and Leon Russell as well as Eric Clapton and Jesse Ed Davis. The Church Studio, located in the Pearl District, is the cultural center for the Tulsa Sound.

Large performing arts complexes include the Tulsa Performing Arts Center, which was designed by World Trade Center architect Minoru Yamasaki, the Cox Business Center, the art deco Expo Square Pavilion, the Mabee Center, the Tulsa Performing Arts Center for Education, and the River Parks Amphitheater and Tulsa's largest venue, the BOK Center. Ten miles west of the city, an outdoor amphitheater called "Discoveryland!" holds the official title of the world performance headquarters for the musical Oklahoma!.

Tulsa's only non-profit arthouse, Circle Cinema, stands as the central hub for the city's film community. It supports the annual Circle Cinema Film Festival and has served as a Satellite Screen for the 2021 Sundance Film Festival. It's walk of fame features famous actors and filmmakers such as Ron Howard, Bill Hader, Kristin Chenoweth, and Sterlin Harjo.

=== Outdoor attractions ===
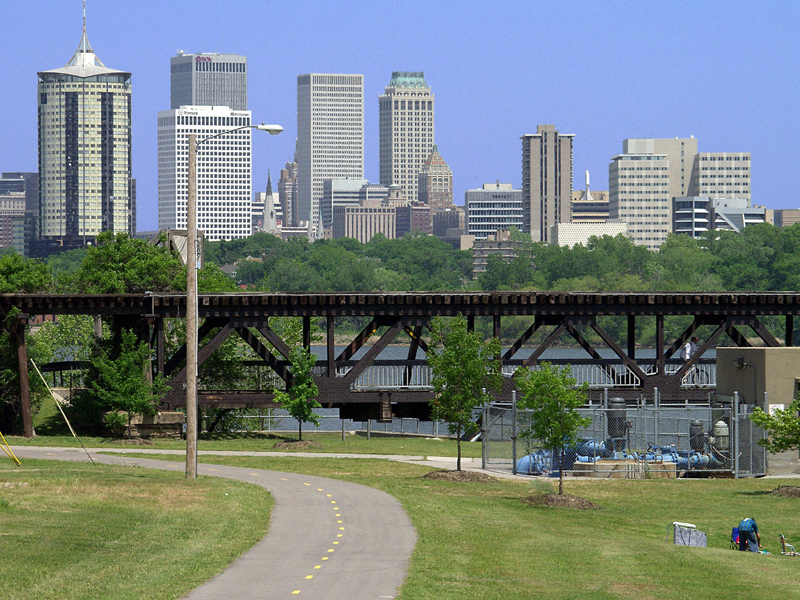
The river parks trail system traverses the banks of the Arkansas River.

Tulsa Zoo encompasses a total of 84 acres (34 ha) with over 2,600 animals representing 400 species. The zoo is located in 2,820-acre (1,140 ha) Mohawk Park (the third largest municipal park in the United States) which also contains the 745-acre (301 ha) Oxley Nature Center.

The Tulsa State Fair, operating in late September and early October, attracts over one million people during its 10-day run. A number of other cultural heritage festivals are held in the city throughout the year, including the Intertribal Indian Club Powwow of Champions in August; Scotfest, India Fest, Greek Festival, and Festival Viva Mexico in September; ShalomFest in October; Dia de Los Muertos Art Festival in November; and the Asian-American Festival in May. The annual Mayfest arts and crafts festival held downtown was estimated to have drawn more than 365,000 people in its four-day run in 2012. On a smaller scale, the city hosts block parties during a citywide "Block Party Day" each year, with festivals varying in size throughout city neighborhoods. Tulsa has one major amusement park attraction, Paradise Beach Waterpark (formerly Safari Joe's H2O Water Park, formerly Big Splash Water Park), featuring multi-story water slides and large wave pools. Until 2006, the city also hosted Bell's Amusement Park, which closed after Tulsa County officials declined to renew its lease agreement.

=== Music ===
Western Swing, a musical genre with roots in country music, was made popular at Tulsa's Cain's Ballroom. The Tulsa Sound, a variation of country, blues, rockabilly, blues rock, swamp rock and rock 'n' roll, was started and largely developed by local musicians J. J. Cale and Leon Russell in the 1960s and 1970s. Musicians from Tulsa or who started their musical careers in Tulsa include Elvin Bishop, Jim Keltner, David Gates, Dwight Twilley, Jesse Ed Davis, Garth Brooks, The Gap Band, St. Vincent, Clyde Stacy, Flash Terry, Hanson, Gus Hardin, Jeff Carson, Ronnie Dunn, Jamie Oldaker, Bob Wills, David Cook, Broncho, Tyson Meade, John Moreland, John Calvin Abney, Kristin Chenoweth, JD McPherson, and Wilderado. The K-Pop singer AleXa, a representative from Tulsa, won American Song Contest in 2022.

=== Public libraries ===
The largest library system in the Tulsa Metropolitan Area, the Tulsa City-County Library, contains over 1.7 million volumes in 25 library facilities. The library is active in the community, holding events and programs at most branches, including free computer classes, children's storytimes, business and job assistance, and scholarly databases with information on a variety of topics. The McFarlin Library at the University of Tulsa is a federal depository library holding over three million items. Founded in 1930, the library is known for its collection of Native American works and the original works of Irish author James Joyce. The Tulsa City-County Library and the University of Tulsa's Law Library are also federal depository libraries, making Tulsa the only city in Oklahoma with more than two federal depository libraries. The Tulsa City County Library's Downtown branch was massively renovated and opened to the public on Saturday, October 1, 2016.

== Cuisine ==
Tulsa restaurants and food trucks offer a number of cuisines, but several cuisines are particularly prominent in its culinary landscape because of its distinctive history.

=== BBQ ===
Tulsa is known nationally for its barbecue offerings; its barbecue reflects its midpoint location "between pig country and cow country", that is, in the transition zone between the South and the West. The city's barbecue is also helped by its geography; the wood used in barbecuing is abundant in Northeastern Oklahoma (including pecan, oak, hickory, mesquite and maple). The region's ethnic diversity is felt, too: its BBQ traditions bear the influences of white, African-American and American Indian foodways. Tulsa is also home to the nationally acclaimed premium smoker manufacturer Hasty-Bake Company. Some Tulsa based barbecue joints have expanded even beyond the state's borders, including Leon's Smoke Shack, Rib Crib and Billy Sims Barbecue. The prize-winning Oklahoma Joe's was founded by Oklahoman Joe Davidson, who mastered his craft at Tulsa's T-Town BBQ Cook-Off.

Oklahoma barbecue is also unique in its emphasis on hickory-smoked barbecue bologna, nicknamed "Oklahoma tenderloin", and its fried okra.

=== Southern "homestyle" food ===
By and large, Tulsa's traditional cuisine reflects the influence of Southern foodways, particularly "upland South and... Texas where many of Oklahoma's nineteenth-century population originated." The prominence of certain foods reflects the agricultural heritage of the surrounding regions. For instance, at the suggestion of experts at what is now Oklahoma State University, peanuts became a major crop in now eastern Oklahoma as a means for lessening the reliance on cotton cultivation. Chicken-fried steak is part of the state meal of Oklahoma and is the signature dish at a number of Tulsa restaurants.

=== Chili and Coney Island hot dogs ===
Oklahomans have been consuming chili since well before statehood, owing to the influence of Mexican-American culture on the state. In 1910, iconic Tulsa restaurant Ike's Chili Parlor opened and Ivan "Ike" Johnson is purported to have acquired his recipe from a Latino Texan named Alex Garcia.

Greek immigrants to Tulsa who came by way of Brooklyn, Pennsylvania, and Michigan brought with them the tradition of Coney Island-style hot dogs with chili on a bun. Today, a related group of Greek-American families operate Coney restaurants around the city, including Coney I-Lander which opened in 1926 and was described by food writers Jane and Michael Stern as perfectly delivering "the cheap-eats ecstasy that is the Coney's soul". Many of these restaurants sell Greek food, either year round or at Tulsa's annual Greek Holiday, sponsored by Holy Trinity Greek Orthodox Church (which dates to 1925).

=== Lebanese steakhouses ===
Lebanese steakhouses were once numerous in the region stretching from Bristow, Oklahoma to Tulsa, but now mostly exist in the Tulsa region. These restaurants were founded by Syrian and Lebanese families who immigrated to Oklahoma before statehood. Traditionally, many of these restaurants had live entertainment (including performers like Ella Fitzgerald and the Ink Spots) and featured Mediterranean dishes like tabbouleh, rice pilaf and hummus alongside local favorites like smoked BBQ bologna.

=== Wild onion dinner ===
The wild onion dinner is a festive gathering that originated with the Southeastern tribes which call Eastern Oklahoma home. The meals often feature wild onion, pork, frybread, corn bread, poke salad and a unique dish known as grape biscuits. The Tulsa Indian Women's Club has been holding annual Wild Onion Dinners since at least 1932.

=== Baking and confectionery ===
Tulsa is home to the Oklahoma Sugar Arts Show, a premier sugar craft competition hosted by Tulsa-based Food Network personality Kerry Vincent. Tulsa is also home to the nationally renowned Pancho Anaya Mexican bakery, recognized by Food & Wine as one of America's 100 best bakeries. Tulsa is home to several national dessert companies: Daylight Donuts was founded in Tulsa and remains headquartered there, as is the Bama Pie Company. In 2025, Country Bird Bakery received the James Beard Award for Outstanding Pastry Chef/Baker.

=== Breweries ===
Brewing in Tulsa dates back to at least the late 1930s with the Ahrens Brewing Company and their Ranger Beer line. The Ahrens Brewing Company opened in May 1938. Tulsa's craft beer scene has boomed since legislation passed allowing for microbreweries to serve the public directly (Tulsa's first microbrewery in the post-World War II era was Marshall Brewing Company in 2008).

== Sports ==
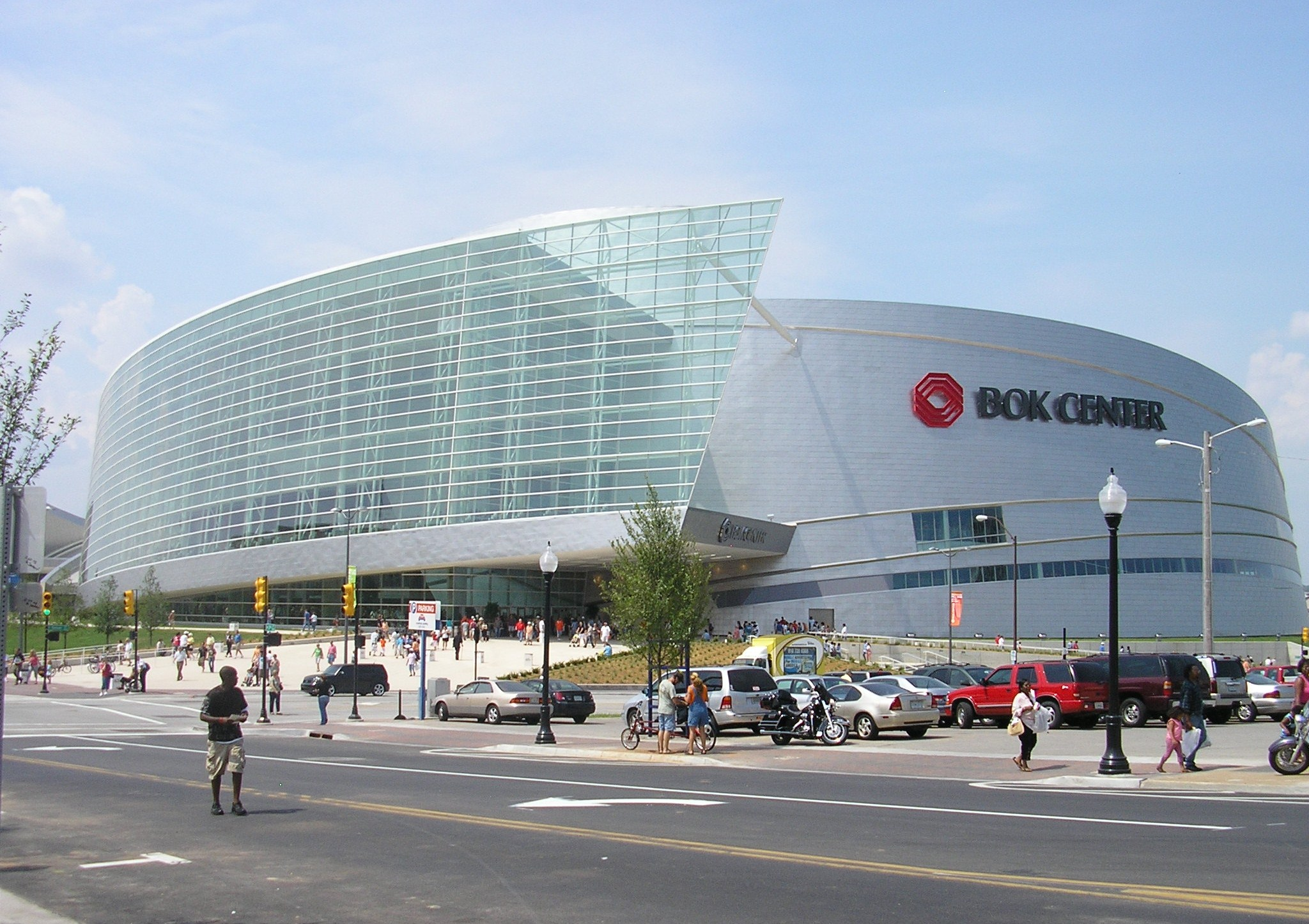
The centerpiece of the Vision 2025 projects, the BOK Center, opened in August 2008.

Tulsa supports a wide array of sports at the professional and collegiate levels. The city hosts two NCAA Division I colleges and multiple professional minor league sports teams in baseball, football, hockey, and soccer. From 2010 to 2015, Tulsa had a WNBA team called the Tulsa Shock.

=== Professional sports ===
Club	Sport	League	Venue
FC Tulsa	Men's soccer	USL	ONEOK Field
Tulsa Oilers	Ice hockey	ECHL	BOK Center
Tulsa Oilers	Indoor football	IFL	BOK Center
Tulsa Drillers	Baseball	MiLB	ONEOK Field
Tulsa Athletic	Men's soccer	TLFC	Hicks Park
Tulsa Rugby Football Club	Rugby union	D3R	37th Riverside Field

Tulsa's Class AA Texas League baseball team is called the Tulsa Drillers; famous former Drillers include Sammy Sosa, Matt Holliday, and Iván Rodríguez.

In 2008, Tulsa funded $39.2 million to build a new ballpark in the Greenwood District near downtown for the Drillers. The ground breaking was held on December 19, 2008. ONEOK bought the naming rights for $10 million for the next 25 years. The first game at ONEOK Field was held on April 8, 2010. Country music star Tim McGraw threw out the first pitch.

The 19,199-seat BOK Center is the centerpiece of the Vision 2025 projects and was completed in August 2008; the BOK Center was in the top ten among indoor arenas worldwide in ticket sales for the first quarter of 2009 when it was the home for the city's Tulsa Shock WNBA, Tulsa Talons arena football, and Tulsa Oilers ice hockey teams; as of 2022, the Oilers are the sole remaining tenant.

=== College sports ===
School	Nickname	Colors	Association	Conference
University of Tulsa	Golden Hurricane	Old gold, royal blue and crimson	NCAA Division I	American
Oral Roberts University	Golden Eagles	Vegas gold and navy blue	NCAA Division I	Summit

Two Tulsa universities compete at the NCAA Division I level: the University of Tulsa Golden Hurricane, and the Oral Roberts University Golden Eagles. The University of Tulsa's men's basketball program has reached the Sweet Sixteen three times, made an appearance in the Elite Eight in 2000, won the NIT championship in 1981 and 2001, and won the inaugural College Basketball Invitational in 2008. The Tulsa football team has played in 16 bowl games, including the Sugar Bowl (twice) and the Orange Bowl. Oral Roberts University's men's basketball team reached the Elite Eight in 1974, the Sweet Sixteen in 2021, and won the Mid-Continent Conference title three straight years, from 2005 to 2007.

The University of Tulsa also boasts one of the nation's top tennis facilities, the Michael D. Case Tennis Center, which hosted the 2004 and 2008 NCAA tennis championships. The Golden Hurricane Tennis program has a string of success, including men's Missouri Valley championships in 1995 and 1996, men's Conference USA championships in 2006, 2007, 2008, 2009, and 2011 and women's Conference USA championships in 2007, 2008, 2010, and 2011. In 2007, Tulsa's top-ranked player Arnau Brugués-Davi ranked as high as #1 in the nation and a four time All-American, advanced to the quarterfinals of the singles competition at the NCAA Men's Tennis Championship, improving on his 2006 round of sixteen appearances.

=== Golf ===
Tulsa is home to the Southern Hills Country Club, which is one of only two courses that have hosted seven men's major championships: three U.S. Opens and five PGA Championships, the most recent in 2022. The course has held five amateur championships and from 2001 to 2008 the LPGA had a regular tour stop, latterly known as the SemGroup Championship at Cedar Ridge Country Club.

Tulsa also hosts two golf courses designed by famed golf course architect A.W. Tillinghast: the Oaks Country Club and Tulsa Country Club. The Tom Fazio-designed Golf Club of Oklahoma is located just outside of Tulsa.

=== Professional soccer ===
Tulsa is home to FC Tulsa, which competes in the USL Championship.

From 1978 to 1984, the city hosted the Tulsa Roughnecks, who played in the now-defunct North American Soccer League and won that league's championship in 1983.

=== Professional football ===
In 1984, the city hosted the Oklahoma Outlaws of the now-defunct United States Football League for a single season.

=== Running, biking and trails ===
The city's running and cycling communities support events such as the Tulsa Tough cycling race, the Hurtland cyclocross, the Route 66 Marathon, and the Tulsa Run, which features over 8000 participants annually. Another popular gambling draw, horse racing events are housed by the Fair Meadows Race Track and Will Rogers Downs in nearby Claremore.

Saint Francis Tulsa Tough Ride and Race is a three-day cycling festival in Tulsa, Oklahoma. It features both non-competitive riding through scenic areas around the Tulsa Metropolitan Area and professional level races. It is held each year on Friday, Saturday, and Sunday, the second weekend in June. Just as popular as the biking itself is the weekend-long festivities at Crybaby Hill, for it is held in the Riverview District. The Blue Dome District hosts its race on the first night and takes riders down East 2nd Street. The race has participants riding at fast speeds through crowded streets lined with cheering spectators, live music, and several vendors. Events include the Men's Cat 3, Women's Pro 1/2, Men's 1/2 and Men's Pro 1.

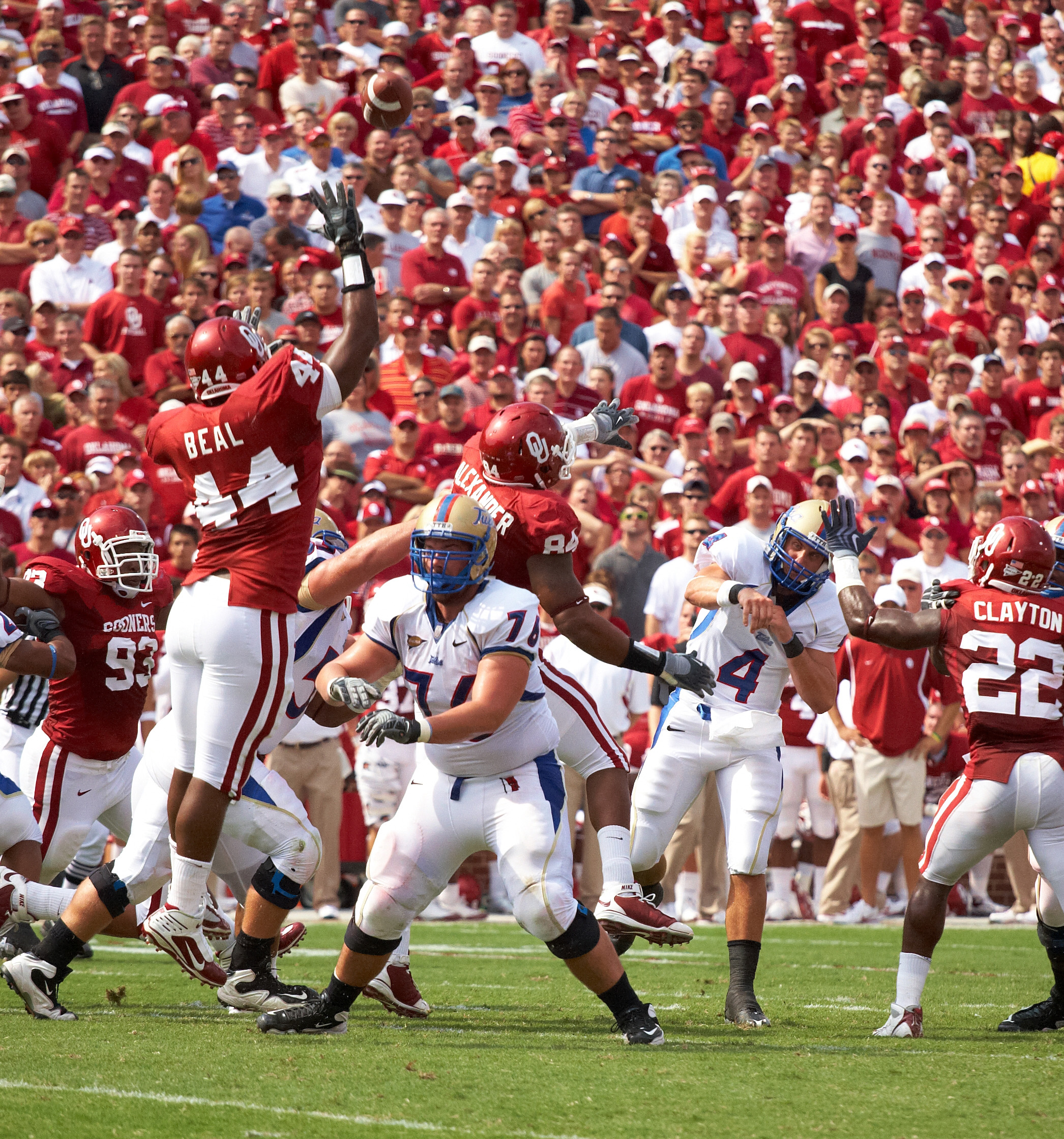
The University of Tulsa football team competes at the NCAA Division I level.

=== Motorsports ===
In motorsports, Tulsa annually hosts the Chili Bowl indoor race at the Tulsa Expo Center. The race was initially sponsored by the Chili Bowl food company of Bob Berryhill. The race has since accommodated "over two hundred race rigs, bleachers for thousands of people and an ever-growing trade show".

== Parks and recreation ==
As of 2016, the city of Tulsa manages 134 parks spread over 8,278 acres (3,350 ha). Woodward Park, a 45-acre (18 ha) tract located in midtown Tulsa, doubles as a botanical garden, featuring the Tulsa Municipal Rose Garden, with more than 6,000 rose plants in 250 varieties, and the Linnaeus Teaching Gardens, which demonstrate the latest and most successful techniques for growing vegetables, annuals, perennials, woody plants and groundcovers.

Some Tulsa-area parks are run by Tulsa County Parks. These include the 270-acre (110 ha) LaFortune Park in Midtown Tulsa, and the 192-acre (78 ha) Chandler Park.

Some parks are under the Tulsa River Parks Authority. These include a series of linear parks that run adjacent to the Arkansas River for about 10 miles (16 km) from downtown to the Jenks bridge. Since 2007 a significant portion of the River Parks area has been renovated with new trails, landscaping, and playground equipment. The River Parks Turkey Mountain Urban Wilderness Area on the west side of the Arkansas River in south Tulsa is a 300-acre (120 ha) area that contains over 45 miles (72 km) of dirt trails available for hiking, trail running, mountain biking and horseback riding.

Gathering Place is a 66-acre (27 ha) park which features a playground, lodge, boathouse, splash playground, sports courts, skate park, wetland pond and garden, trails, classrooms, and amphitheatre.

=== Bicycling ===
Tulsa has a number of cycling trails, and has installed protected bike lanes in parts of the downtown area. Additional efforts to expand this infrastructure have been included as part of the city's "GoPlan".

== Government ==
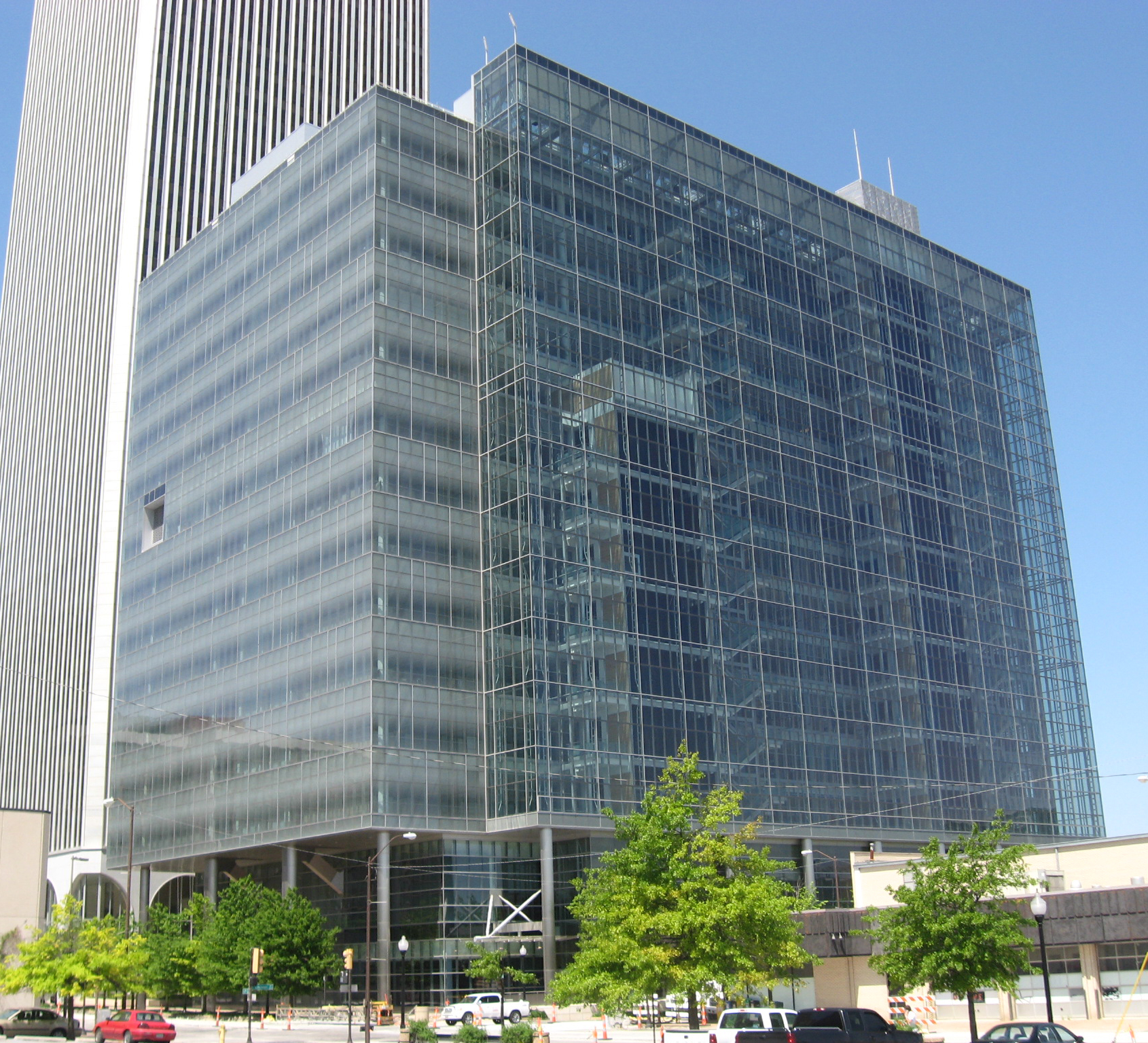
The Tulsa City Hall serves as the base for most city government functions.

A mayor-council government has been in place in Tulsa since 1989, when the city converted from a city commission government deemed wasteful and less efficient. Since the change, Tulsa mayors have been given more power in accordance with a strong mayoral system and have greater control of a more consolidated array of governmental branches. Plurality voting is used to elect mayors, who serve a term in office of four years. The present mayor of Tulsa is Democrat Monroe Nichols, who won the 2024 mayoral election and took office on December 2, 2024. Another Tulsa political figure, Jim Inhofe, who represented Oklahoma in the United States Senate for 30 years, served as the mayor of Tulsa early in his political career.

A city councilor from each of the city's nine council districts is elected every two years, each serving a term of two years. Councilors are elected from their own respective districts based on a plurality voting system, and serve on the Tulsa City Council. As a whole, the council acts as the legislative body of the city government, which aims to pass laws, approve the city budget, and manage efficiency in the city government. In accordance with the mayor-council form of government, the Tulsa City Council and the office of the Mayor coordinate in city government operations. A third body of the government, the city auditor, is elected independently of the city council and mayor to ensure that the auditor can act in an objective manner. The auditor is elected for a term of two years. Phil Wood, a Democrat, held the position for 21 years before being defeated by Republican Preston Doerflinger in the 2009 election. The city serves as the seat of county government for Tulsa County, and lies mostly within Oklahoma's 1st congressional district, with its far northwestern areas in southern Osage County in Oklahoma's 3rd congressional district. Municipal and state laws are enforced in Tulsa by the Tulsa Police Department, an organization of 781 officers as of 2012.

== Education ==
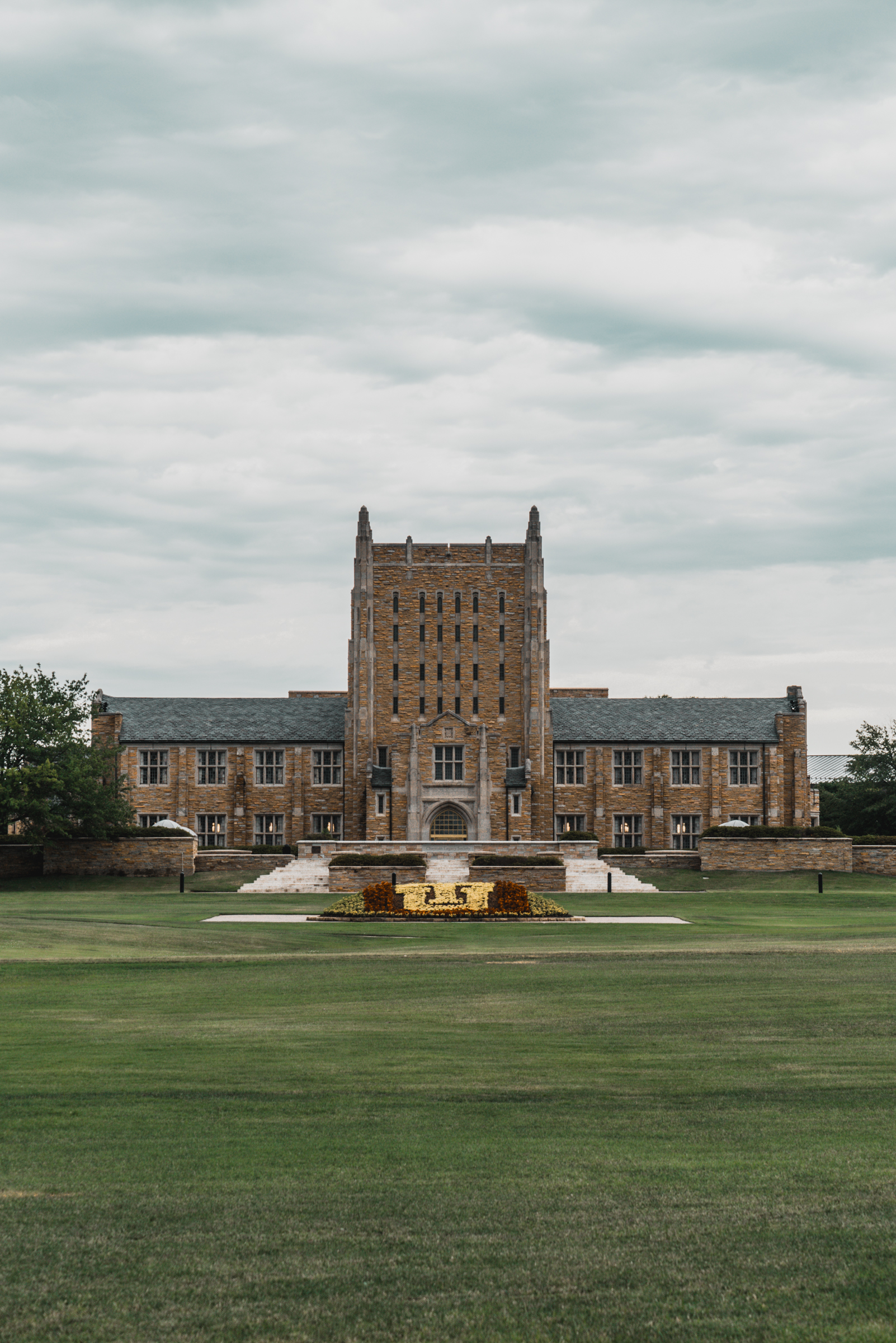
The McFarlin Library serves the University of Tulsa campus.

=== K–12 education ===
Tulsa Public Schools, with nine high schools and over 41,000 students, is the second-largest school district in Oklahoma. In 2006, there were more than 90,000 students attending Tulsa County's public schools.

Portions of Tulsa within Tulsa County are in the following school districts: Tulsa, Berryhill, Bixby, Broken Arrow, Jenks, Owasso, and Union. Portions within Osage County are in Tulsa Public Schools. Portions within Wagoner County are in the following districts: Tulsa, Broken Arrow, and Catoosa. The Allen-Bowden School District facility in Creek County has a Tulsa postal address, but none of its area is in the Tulsa city limits.

A variety of independent and sectarian schools exist in Tulsa, also. Most, but not all, of the private schools have religious affiliations with various Christian, Jewish or Muslim denominations. The Catholic Diocese of Tulsa supports a system of parochial and diocesan schools, including Bishop Kelley High School, administered by the LaSallians (French Christian Brothers). Another Catholic high school, Cascia Hall Preparatory School, is administered by Augustinians. Holland Hall School is independent but historically affiliated with the Episcopal Church. Riverfield Country Day School is non-sectarian.

=== History of K-12 education ===
The Presbyterian Church (PCUSA) established the Presbyterian Mission Day School, a one-story building at what would become the intersection of 4th Street and Boston Avenue in 1884. A second story was soon added to accommodate the number of children who were to attend. This school operated until 1889. When Tulsa incorporated in 1899, it took over the school, which became the first public school. James M. Hall and three other men bought the property with their own funds and held the title until the city could reimburse them.

Tulsa built its first two public schools in 1905. The construction of more schools began accelerating in 1906. In December 1907, control of the public schools passed from the city government to the Tulsa Board of Education.

Tulsa High School opened in 1906 on the same block formerly occupied by the Presbyterian mission school, which had been razed. The new school was a three-story cream colored brick building with a dome. The school was accredited by the North Central Association of Schools and Colleges in 1913. It proved too small by 1916, when Tulsa voters approved a bond issue to construct a new high school at Sixth Street and Cincinnati Avenue, which was renamed Central High School. The north half of this facility opened in 1917, while the south half opened in 1922. The building remained in this service until 1976, when it was replaced by a new building on West Edison Street. The old building was taken over by the Public Service Company of Oklahoma.

=== Higher education ===
The first institute of higher education was established in Tulsa when Kendall College, a Presbyterian school, moved from Muskogee to Tulsa in 1907. In 1920, the school merged with a proposed McFarlin College to become the University of Tulsa (abbreviated as TU). The McFarlin Library of TU was named for the principal donor of the proposed college, oilman Robert M. McFarlin.

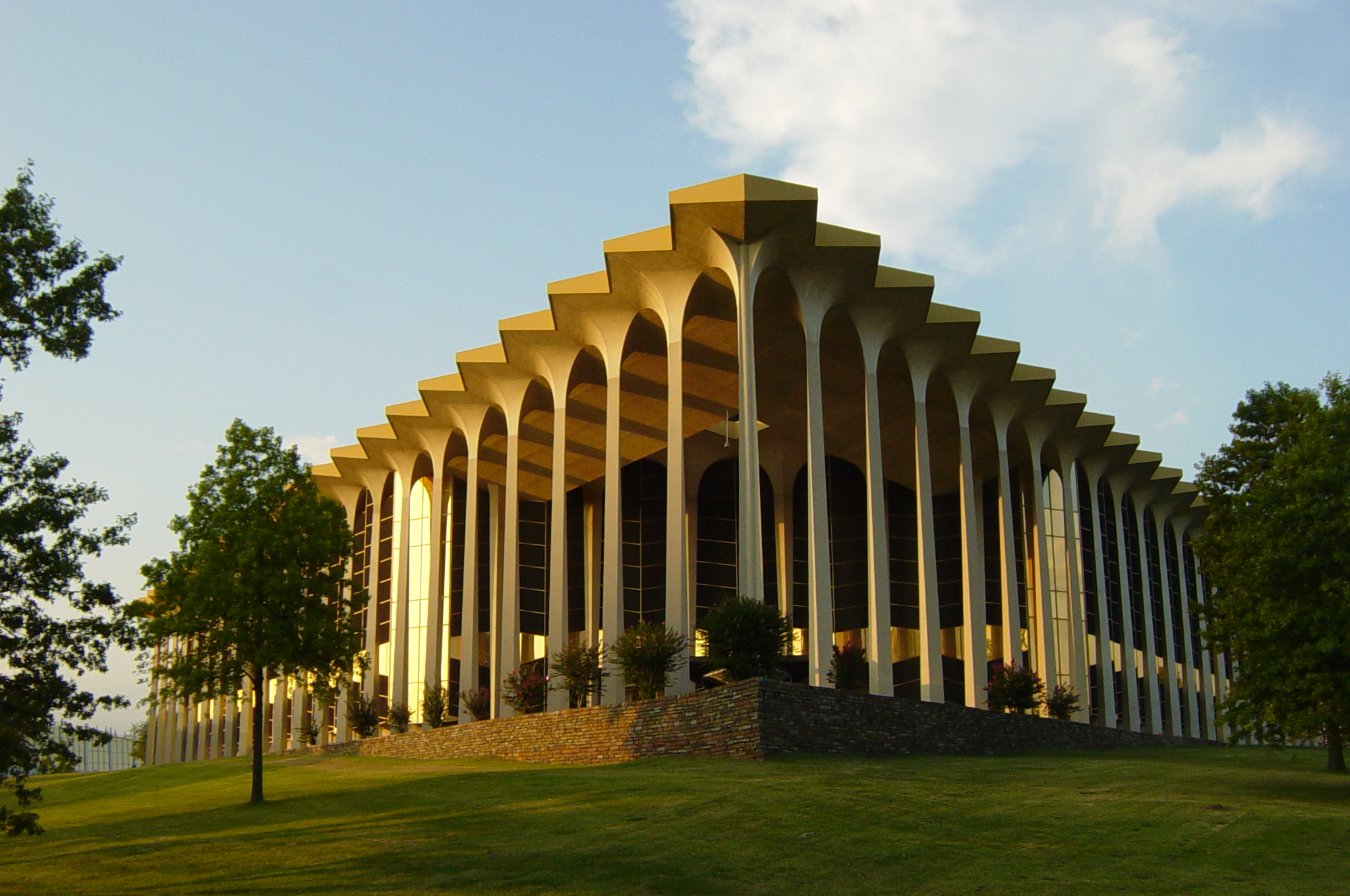
The Graduate Center houses Oral Roberts University's graduate college.

Tulsa has 15 institutions of higher education, including two private universities: the University of Tulsa, a school founded in 1894, and Oral Roberts University, a school founded by evangelist Oral Roberts in 1963.

The University of Tulsa has an enrollment of 3,832 undergraduate and graduate students as of 2021. In addition to doctoral and masters programs, TU is home to the University of Tulsa College of Law and the Collins College of Business. TU also manages the famous Gilcrease Museum in northwest Tulsa and hosts the Alexandre Hogue Gallery on its main campus.

Oral Roberts University is a charismatic Christian institution with an enrollment of 5,109 undergraduate and graduate students.

Both of the state's flagship research universities have campuses in Tulsa:

- Oklahoma State University houses three campuses in the city, the OSU Center for Health Sciences, the OSU College of Osteopathic Medicine, and OSU – Tulsa, accommodating upper-level undergraduate and graduate courses. OSU-Tulsa has an advanced materials research facility and is home to the Oklahoma Center for Poets and Writers.
- The University of Oklahoma operates what is known as the OU-Tulsa Schusterman Center, offering bachelors, master's, and doctoral degree programs in conjunction with the main campus in Norman and the OU Health Sciences Center in Oklahoma City. The OU-Tulsa Schusterman Center also houses the OU School of Community Medicine, the first medical school of its kind in the United States.

Rogers State University in Claremore, Oklahoma, is the Tulsa area's original public, undergraduate-focused, four-year university. Tulsa Community College (TCC), the largest community college in Oklahoma, operates four campuses spread across the area as well as a conference center in Midtown, and has a partnership allowing students to complete four-year bachelor's degrees through OU-Tulsa, OSU-Tulsa, LU-Tulsa and NSU-Broken Arrow. Tulsa also has a Tulsa branch of Langston University, the only historically black college or university in the state, founded in 1897. Tulsa previously had a branch campus of St. Gregory's University, a Catholic university with its main campus in Shawnee, Oklahoma; however, that school went into bankruptcy in 2017. New York University operates a study away center in Tulsa for its students.

The Spartan School of Aeronautics enrolls 1,500 students at its flight programs near Tulsa International Airport and the city's vocational education is headed by Tulsa Technology Center, the oldest and largest vocational technology institution in the state.

Among trade schools located in Tulsa are Community Care College (including branches Oklahoma Technical College and Clary Sage College), Holberton School Tulsa, Tulsa Welding School (Tulsa Campus) and Tulsa Tech.

== Media ==
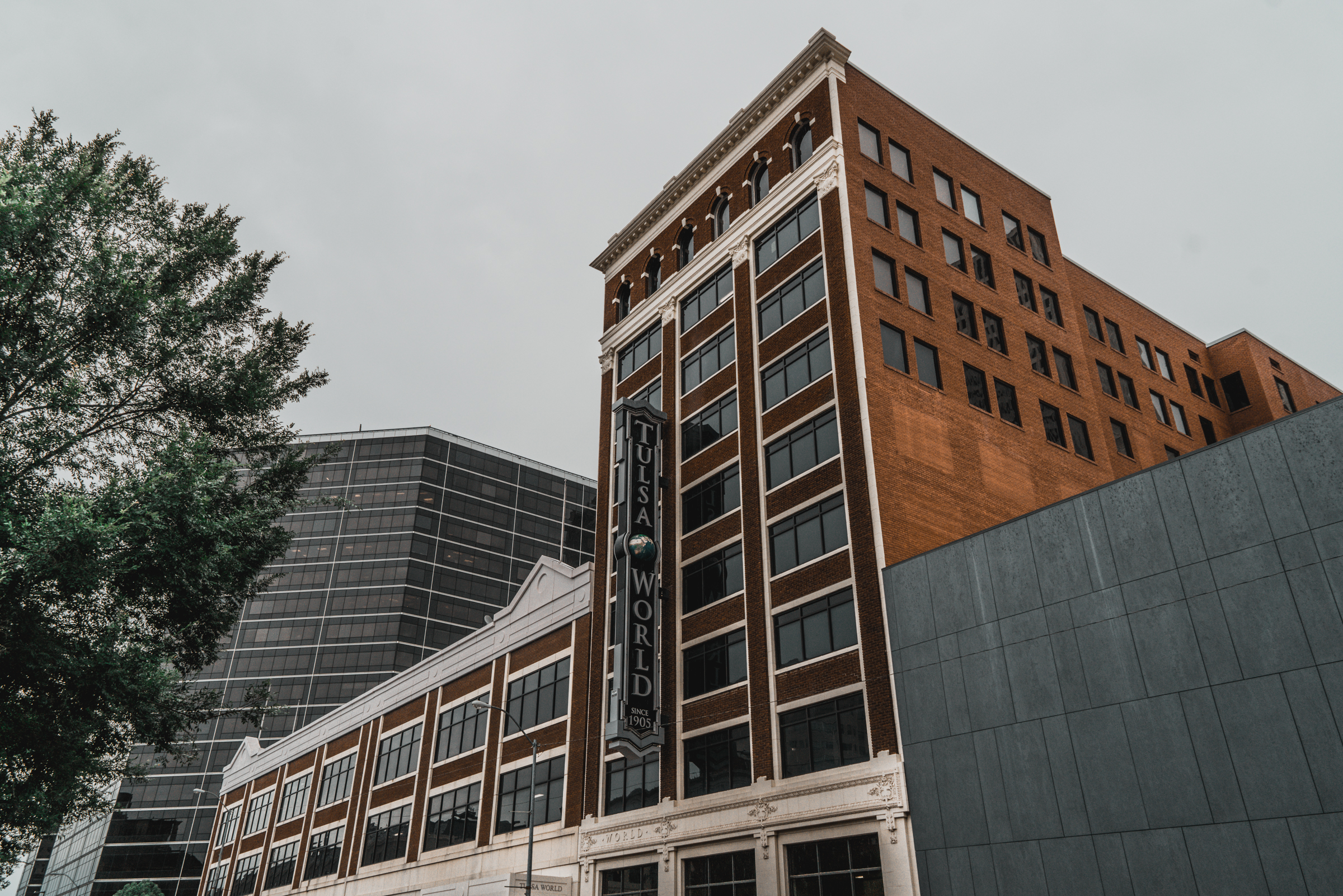
The Tulsa World operates primarily from its headquarters in downtown Tulsa.

=== Print ===
Tulsa's leading newspaper is the daily Tulsa World, the second-most widely circulated newspaper in Oklahoma with a Sunday circulation of 189,789.

The Tulsa Voice is an Alt-Weekly newspaper covering entertainment and cultural events. Covering primarily economic events and stocks, the Tulsa Business Journal caters to Tulsa's business sector. Other publications include the Oklahoma Indian Times, the Spanish/English dual-language La Semana, the Tulsa Daily Commerce and Legal News, the Tulsa Beacon, This Land Press, and the Tulsa Free Press. The first black-owned newspaper was the Tulsa Star, which ceased publication when its office burned during the Tulsa race massacre. It was succeeded by the Oklahoma Eagle, which began publishing using the press salvaged from the Star's office.

Until 1992, the Tulsa Tribune served as a daily afternoon newspaper competing with the Tulsa World. The paper was acquired by the Tulsa World that year. Urban Tulsa Weekly served as the city's alt-weekly paper from 1991 until its closure in 2013.

=== Television and radio ===
Tulsa is also served by television and radio broadcasting networks. All major U.S. television networks are represented in Tulsa through local affiliates in the designated market area (a region covering a 22-county area serving the northeastern and east-central portions of Oklahoma, and far southeastern Kansas); these include NBC affiliate KJRH-TV (channel 2), CBS affiliate KOTV-DT (channel 6), ABC/Fox affiliate KTUL (channel 8), PBS station KOED-TV (channel 11, a satellite of the state-run OETA member network), CW affiliate KQCW-DT (channel 19), Roar affiliate KOKI-TV (channel 23), MyNetworkTV affiliate KMYT-TV (channel 41), Ion Television owned-and-operated station KTPX-TV (channel 44). The market is also home to several religious stations including TBN owned-and-operated station KDOR-TV (channel 17), religious/secular independent station KWHB (channel 47), and Oral Roberts University-owned KGEB (channel 53, which is distributed nationwide via satellite as GEB America).

Cable television service in the area is provided by Cox Communications, which acquired Tele-Communications Inc. (TCI)'s franchise rights to the area in a $2.85 billion deal (which also included the purchase of AT&T Broadband's Louisiana cable systems, minority ownership of TCA Cable TV systems in Texas, Louisiana and New Mexico, and TCI's Peak Cablevision systems in four other Oklahoma cities, and select markets in Arkansas, Utah and Nevada) in July 1999; Cox assumed control of TCI's Tulsa-area systems on March 15, 2000.

== Infrastructure ==
=== Transportation ===
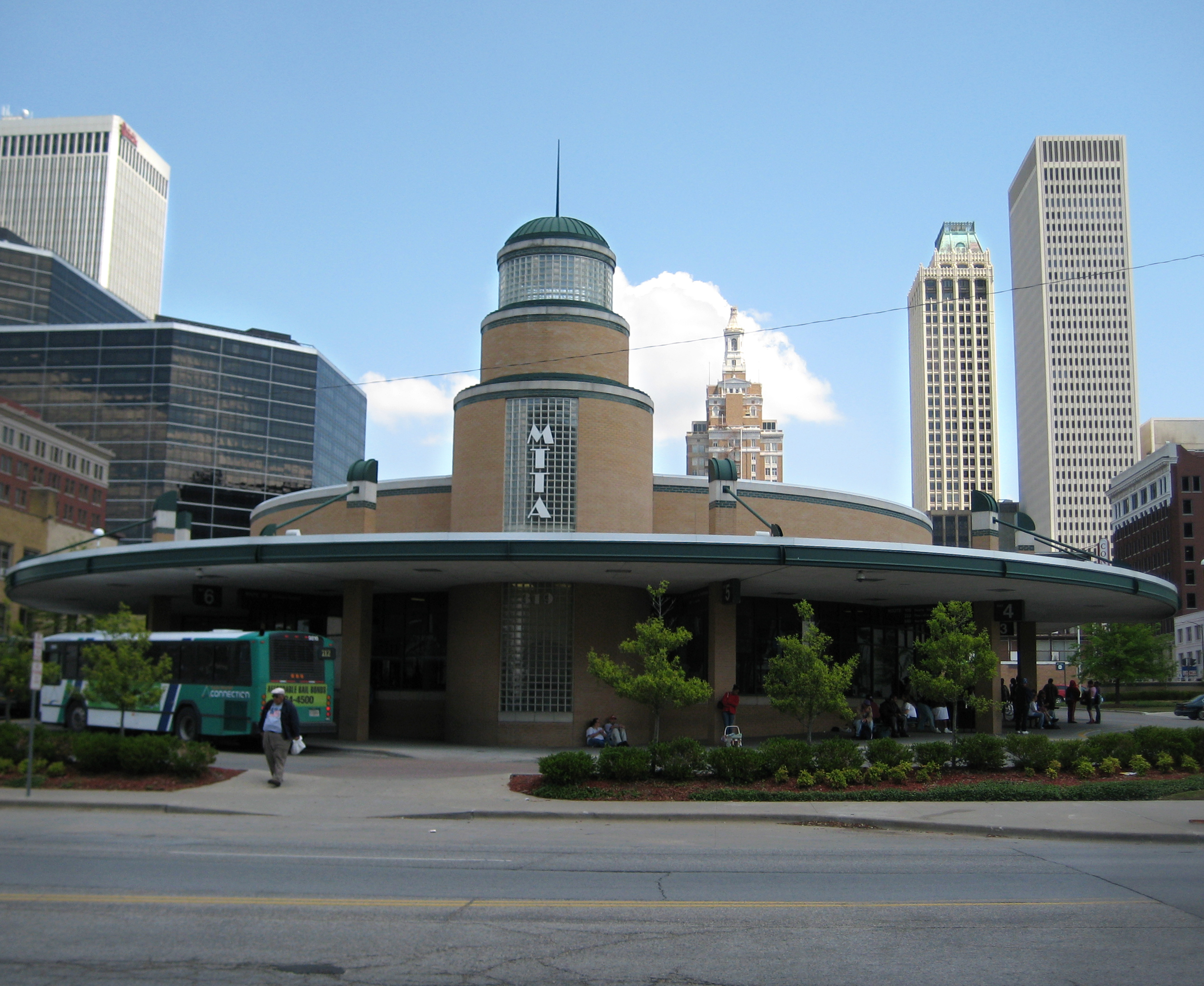
The Tulsa Transit bus network, operating from its Denver Avenue Station transit center in downtown, helps meet city infrastructure needs.

Transportation in Tulsa is aided by MetroLink's bus network of 97 vehicles and two primary airports, while the Tulsa Port of Catoosa provides transportation of goods and industry through international trade routes.

==== Highways ====
Tulsa has an extensive highway system that connects many cities in the region such as Joplin, Missouri on the Will Rogers Turnpike and Oklahoma City on the Turner Turnpike. Most commuters use the highway system in Tulsa to get to and from work. Highways that run through Tulsa are I-44, I-244, I-444 (unsigned), US-412, US-169, OK-66, US-64, US-75, OK-11, OK-51, OK-364/Creek Turnpike, and OK-344/Gilcrease Expressway.

In 2011, the Oklahoma Department of Transportation (ODOT) reported that Tulsa's busiest freeway was US-169 with about 121,500 vehicles daily between 51st and 61st Streets, and its second busiest freeway was OK-51 with about 104,200 vehicles between Memorial and I-44. Surrounding Downtown is the Inner Dispersal Loop (sometimes called the "I-D-L"), which connects Downtown with almost all the highways in Tulsa.

In 2023, ODOT and the American Association of State Highway and Transportation Officials (AASHTO) approved applying the Interstate 42 designation to US-412, contingent on upgrades. This includes the segment of I-244 in Tulsa.

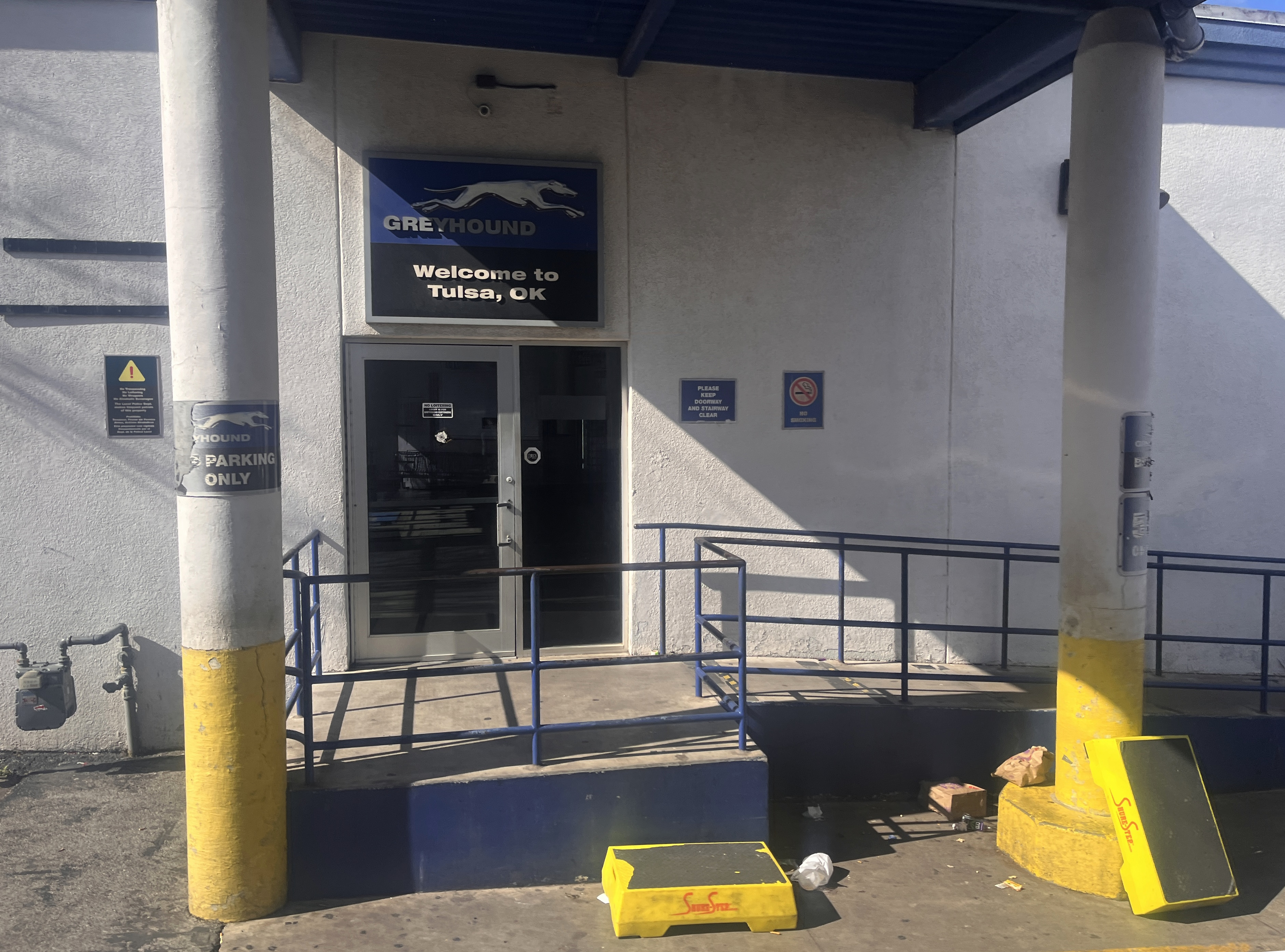
Entrance to the Greyhound bus station located near downtown

==== Buses ====
MetroLink (formerly Tulsa Transit), the city's transit bus operator, runs buses on 18 different routes across Tulsa and in surrounding suburbs such as Broken Arrow, Sand Springs and Jenks. Tulsa Transit has two stations: the Memorial Midtown Station at 7952 East 33rd Street in Midtown Tulsa, and the Denver Avenue Station at 319 South Denver, across from the BOK Center in Downtown. Most routes go through one or both of the stations, facilitating the commute to work and events in Downtown or Midtown. Buses stop at specific stops such as Tulsa Community College, Oklahoma State University-Tulsa, CityPlex Towers, Cox Communications, the various medical facilities in Tulsa, and many shopping destinations, hotels, and schools. The bus schedules are periodically changed; votes are taken by Tulsa Transit to help decide the particulars of certain routes. Tulsa debuted its first bus rapid transit line, Aero on Peoria Avenue, in November 2019. The service has more frequent buses, upgraded stations, and faster travel times.

Intercity bus service is provided by both Greyhound Lines and Jefferson Lines. The station for both is at 317 South Detroit, five blocks from Tulsa Transit's Downtown bus terminal. As to private chartered bus companies, Red Carpet Charters (also known as Red Carpet Trailways of Tulsa) is an independent member of the Trailways Charter Bus Network.

==== Airports ====
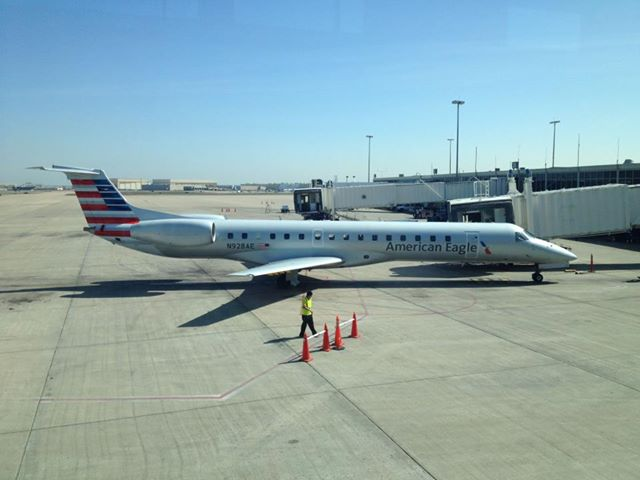
An American Eagle aircraft in new livery at Tulsa International Airport

Tulsa International Airport, which has service on twelve commercial airlines (eight passenger and four cargo ones), serves more than three million travelers annually, with almost 80 departures every day. In 2007, the airport completed most of an expansion project, which included larger terminal sizes and the addition of restaurants and shops. In 2011, the airport opened the newly renovated Concourse B, complete with skylights, open gate holds, an average of 76 ways to charge a device per gate, and much more. Concourse A is under renovation. Tulsa Riverside Airport, previously known as Richard Lloyd Jones Jr. Airport, a general aviation airport in West Tulsa, saw 335,826 takeoffs and landings in 2008, making it the busiest airport in Oklahoma and the fifth-busiest general aviation airport in the nation. Its operations contribute over $3.2 million to the economy annually. The Tulsa Airports Improvement Trust also manages the Okmulgee Regional Airport in Okmulgee, Oklahoma, further to the south of Tulsa.

==== Railways ====
Freight railways bisect the city in every direction; the state's chief freight rail transporter is BNSF, operator of the Cherokee Rail Yard in Tulsa, which facility includes a freight terminal, diesel shop and hump yard for railcar sorting. Other Class I transporters are Union Pacific Railroad, as well as the CPKC (formerly the Kansas City Southern Railway) via a short-line switch on the South Kansas and Oklahoma Railroad.

Tulsa Union Depot served Frisco, M-K-T and Santa Fe passenger trains until the 1960s. The Santa Fe continued service through use of its own station until 1971. There are no mass transit rail lines in Tulsa, but the prospect of passenger rail lines from Downtown Tulsa to the suburb of Broken Arrow has been studied.

Long-distance passenger rail transportation today serves Tulsa only through Greyhound bus lines, which provide bus connections to nearby cities with Amtrak stations. A private proposal to re-establish passenger service between Oklahoma City and Tulsa via a train called the Eastern Flyer fell through in 2019. However, in early 2024, the Federal Railroad Administration released an interim report on its ongoing Amtrak Daily Long-Distance Service Study regarding fifteen new or previously discontinued rail routes under consideration for federal funding, which included a proposed route from Oklahoma City to Tulsa, and on from Tulsa to St. Louis in one direction and Kansas City in another.

Tulsa has two static displays of antique steam railroad locomotives for free public viewing: the 1917 wood-burning Dierks Forest 207, a Baldwin 2-6-2 Prairie-type located at the Tulsa State Fairgrounds; and, the 1942 oil-burning Frisco Meteor 4500, a Baldwin 4-8-4 Northern-type at the Route 66 Historical Village at 3770 Southwest Boulevard.

==== Port of Catoosa ====
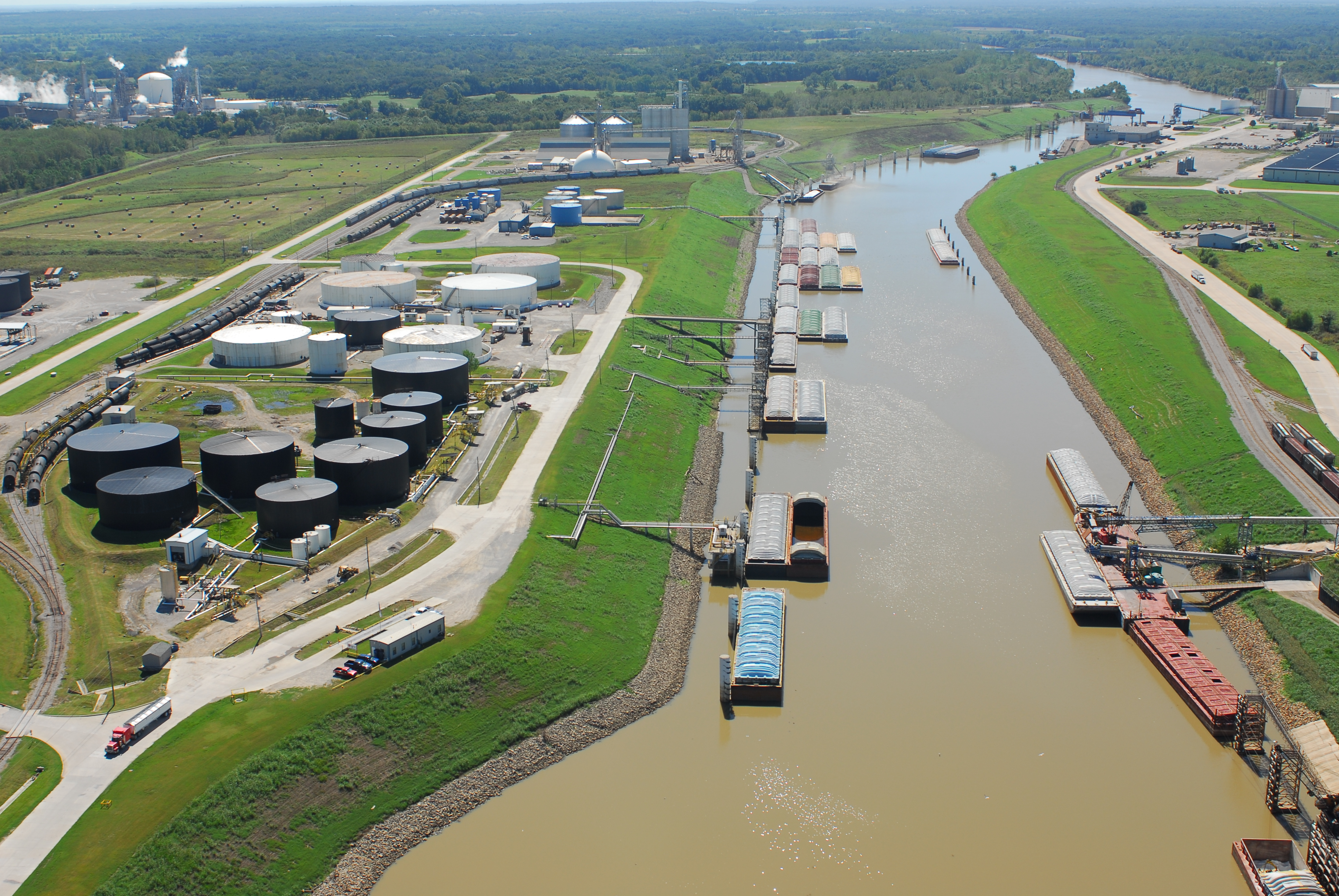
The Tulsa Port of Catoosa

At the head of the McClellan-Kerr Arkansas River Navigation System, the Tulsa Port of Catoosa is an inland port in the United States and connects barge traffic from Tulsa to the Mississippi River via the Verdigris River and the Arkansas River. The facility is one of the largest riverports in the United States and contributes to one of the busiest waterways in the world via its course to the Gulf of Mexico.

=== Medical facilities ===
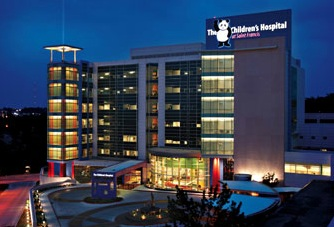
In 2010, Saint Francis completed a new Children's Hospital.

The Saint Francis Health System owns several hospitals with a central location at Saint Francis Hospital in the southern part of the city. The facility contains 700 doctors and 918 beds, and with more than 7,000 employees, the network is the second-largest healthcare employer in the state. The health system also operates a heart hospital, which was named by General Electric in 2004 one of the most advanced heart hospitals in the nation. St. John Medical Center, located in an 11-story midtown center, employs nearly 700 doctors. Other networks, such as Hillcrest Health System, operate a number of facilities of various sizes. Beginning in 2007, the city elected to renew a five-year contract with EMSA for ambulance service after a period spent contemplating a switch to the Tulsa Fire Department for the provision of such services.

== In popular culture ==
- Several films starring Brat Pack actors and written by S.E. Hinton were filmed in Tulsa in the early 1980s; among them were Tex (1982), The Outsiders (1983), Rumble Fish (1983), That Was Then... This Is Now (1985) and Fandango (1985).
- The FX television shows Reservation Dogs and The Lowdown prominently feature Tulsa
- "Tulsa Time" song by Don Williams
- "Tampa to Tulsa" song by The Jayhawks
- Most of the HBO TV series Watchmen (2019) takes place in Tulsa.
- "Twenty Four Hours from Tulsa" song by Gene Pitney
- "Tulsa County" song by The Byrds
- "Tulsa Telephone Book" song by Tom T. Hall
- "Tulsa Jesus Freak" song by Lana Del Rey
- Tulsa King TV series starring Sylvester Stallone is primarily set in Tulsa
- Three of S.E. Hinton's novels, The Outsiders, That Was Then, This is Now, and Rumble Fish, take place in Tulsa.
- The 2020 drama film Minari was filmed in Tulsa.

== Sister cities ==
In accordance with the Tulsa Global Alliance, which operates in conjunction with Sister Cities International, an organization that began under President Dwight Eisenhower in 1956, Tulsa has nine international sister cities in an attempt to foster cross-cultural understanding:

- Amiens, France
- Beihai, China
- Celle, Germany
- Kaohsiung, Taiwan
- Mwanza, Tanzania
- San Luis Potosí, Mexico
- Tiberias, Israel
- Utsunomiya, Japan
- Zelenograd, Russia

== See also ==
- Tulsa (book)
- Tulsa (movie)
- List of oil refineries
- USS Tulsa, 3 ships
