= National Register of Historic Places listings in Tulsa County, Oklahoma =

Location of Tulsa County in Oklahoma

This is a list of the National Register of Historic Places listings in Tulsa County, Oklahoma.

This is intended to be a complete list of the properties and districts on the National Register of Historic Places in Tulsa County, Oklahoma, United States. The locations of National Register properties and districts for which the latitude and longitude coordinates are included below, may be seen in a map.

There are 110 properties and districts listed on the National Register in the county, including 1 National Historic Landmark.

This National Park Service list is complete through NPS recent listings posted November 6, 2026.

== Current listings ==
	Name on the Register	Image	Date listed	Location	City or town	Description
1	66 Motel		December 13, 1996 (#96001487)	3660 Southwest Boulevard; 36°06′37″N 96°00′46″W	Tulsa	Demolished in 2001.
2	100 Block North Greenwood Avenue	100 Block North Greenwood Avenue	June 10, 2021 (#100006631)	100 Block North Greenwood Avenue; 36°09′37″N 95°59′11″W	Tulsa	
3	Ambassador Hotel	Ambassador Hotel	November 17, 1999 (#99001085)	1314 S. Main; 36°08′34″N 95°59′14″W	Tulsa	
4	Atlas Life Building	Atlas Life Building	May 19, 2009 (#09000358)	415 S. Boston Ave. 36°09′08″N 95°59′20″W	Tulsa	
5	Belmont Apartments	Belmont Apartments	December 8, 2015 (#15000876)	1314 S. Denver Ave., W. 36°08′35″N 95°59′32″W	Tulsa	
6	Charles and Bertha Blevins House	Charles and Bertha Blevins House	March 5, 2024 (#100010050)	1838 North Norfolk Avenue; 36°10′55″N 95°58′41″W	Tulsa	
7	Blue Cross Blue Shield of Oklahoma Building	Blue Cross Blue Shield of Oklahoma Building	September 12, 2016 (#16000624)	1215 S. Boulder Ave. 36°08′39″N 95°59′19″W	Tulsa	
8	Blue Dome Historic District	Blue Dome Historic District	January 4, 2012 (#11000895)	Roughly between S. Kenosha & S. Detroit Aves., Frisco Railroad tracks, & E. 8th St. 36°09′17″N 95°59′03″W	Tulsa	part of the Route 66 and Associated Resources in Oklahoma AD MPS
9	Boston Avenue Methodist Episcopal Church	Boston Avenue Methodist Episcopal Church	August 31, 1978 (#78002270)	1301 South Boston Ave. 36°08′38″N 95°59′04″W	Tulsa	
10	Boulder-on-the-Park	Boulder-on-the-Park	September 2, 2003 (#03000872)	1850 S. Boulder Ave. 36°08′02″N 95°59′20″W	Tulsa	
11	Brady Heights Historic District	Brady Heights Historic District	June 27, 1980 (#80003302)	Roughly bounded by Marshall and Easton Sts. and Denver and Cheyenne Aves. 36°09′58″N 95°59′54″W	Tulsa	
12	Brady Historic District	Brady Historic District	September 3, 2010 (#10000618)	Roughly along E/W Cameron and E/W Archer, from N. Boulder to N. Detroit; 36°09′31″N 95°59′33″W	Tulsa	
13	Broken Arrow Elementary-Junior High School	Broken Arrow Elementary-Junior High School	March 7, 2003 (#03000095)	210 N. Main; 36°03′18″N 95°47′28″W	Broken Arrow	
14	Buena Vista Park Historic District	Buena Vista Park Historic District	September 6, 2007 (#07000919)	Roughly bounded by W. 18th St., S., rear lot lines of the eastern side of S. Cheyenne Ave., W., W. 21st St., S., and Riverside Dr./S. Carson; 36°08′05″N 95°59′24″W	Tulsa	
15	Cain’s Dancing Academy	Cain’s Dancing Academy	September 4, 2003 (#03000874)	423 N. Main; 36°09′38″N 95°59′35″W	Tulsa	
16	Carlton Place Historic District	Carlton Place Historic District	September 6, 2007 (#07000907)	Bounded by W. 14th St., S., S. Carson Ave., W., W. 15th St., S., and S. Cathage Ave., W. 36°08′29″N 95°59′28″W	Tulsa	
17	Casa Loma Hotel	Casa Loma Hotel	September 3, 2010 (#10000805)	2626-2648 E. Eleventh St. 36°08′52″N 95°57′10″W	Tulsa	Route 66 and Associated Resources in Oklahoma AD MPS
18	Cheairs Furniture Company Building	Cheairs Furniture Company Building	June 11, 2018 (#100002546)	537 S Kenosha Ave. 36°09′12″N 95°58′56″W	Tulsa	
19	The Church Studio	The Church Studio	September 8, 2017 (#100001595)	304 S. Trenton Ave. 36°09′24″N 95°58′10″W	Tulsa	
20	Circle Cinema	Circle Cinema	March 7, 2003 (#03000098)	10 S. Lewis Ave. 36°09′33″N 95°57′29″W	Tulsa	
21	Cities Service Station #8	Cities Service Station #8	March 14, 2011 (#11000080)	1648 Southwest Boulevard; 36°08′17″N 96°00′26″W	Tulsa	Route 66 and Associated Resources in Oklahoma AD MPS
22	City Veterinary Hospital	City Veterinary Hospital	August 26, 2008 (#08000848)	3550 S. Peoria Ave. 36°06′43″N 95°58′34″W	Tulsa	Moderne-style work of Hungarian-American architect Joseph R. Koberling, Jr.
23	Clinton-Hardy House	Clinton-Hardy House	January 23, 1979 (#79002027)	1322 S. Guthrie; 36°08′34″N 95°59′45″W	Tulsa	
24	Convention Hall	Convention Hall	August 29, 1979 (#79002028)	105 W. Brady St. 36°09′29″N 95°59′43″W	Tulsa	
25	Cosden Building	Cosden Building	February 1, 1979 (#79002029)	409 S. Boston; 36°09′09″N 95°59′20″W	Tulsa	
26	Creek Council Tree Site	Creek Council Tree Site	September 29, 1976 (#76001576)	18th and Cheyenne Sts. 36°08′13″N 95°59′24″W	Tulsa	
27	Dawson School	Dawson School	December 7, 2001 (#01001357)	Junction of East Ute Place and N. Kingston Pl. 36°11′02″N 95°54′32″W	Tulsa	
28	Downtown Tulsa YMCA	Downtown Tulsa YMCA	September 7, 2016 (#16000625)	515 S. Denver Ave. 36°08′58″N 95°59′36″W	Tulsa	Now Y Loft Apartments
29	Carl K. Dresser House	Carl K. Dresser House	June 2, 2000 (#00000625)	235 W. 18th St. 36°08′11″N 95°59′29″W	Tulsa	
30	Eleventh Street Arkansas River Bridge	Eleventh Street Arkansas River Bridge	December 13, 1996 (#96001488)	Former U.S. Route 66 over the Arkansas River from Tulsa to West Tulsa; 36°08′38″N 96°00′10″W	Tulsa	
31	Elizabeth Manor	Elizabeth Manor	June 8, 2015 (#15000329)	1820 S. Boulder Ave., W. 36°08′07″N 95°59′21″W	Tulsa	
32	Fire Station No. 13	Fire Station No. 13	March 13, 2020 (#100005084)	3924 Charles Page Blvd. 36°08′52″N 96°02′14″W	Tulsa	Now event space
33	First Christian Church	First Christian Church	October 6, 2026 (#100013527)	913 South Boulder Avenue; 36°08′47″N 95°59′18″W	Tulsa	
34	First National Bank	First National Bank	March 4, 2015 (#15000066)	123 E. W.C. Rogers Blvd. 36°22′07″N 96°00′01″W	Skiatook	
35	Fort Arbuckle Site		December 22, 1978 (#78002269)	West of Sand Springs; 36°09′15″N 96°13′29″W	Sand Springs	
36	Fox Hotel	Fox Hotel	December 10, 2014 (#14001033)	201 East W.C. Rogers Blvd. 36°22′07″N 96°00′00″W	Skiatook	
37	Garden Park Historic District	Garden Park Historic District	March 12, 2026 (#100012563)	2126 E. 59th Street; 36°04′41″N 95°57′41″W	Tulsa	
38	Gillette Historic District	Gillette Historic District	September 20, 1982 (#82003702)	Bounded by S. Yorktown and S. Lewis Aves, E. 15th and E. 17th Sts. 36°08′21″N 95°57′35″W	Tulsa	
39	Gillette-Tyrrell Building	Gillette-Tyrrell Building	January 21, 1982 (#82003703)	423 S. Boulder Ave. 36°09′04″N 95°59′27″W	Tulsa	
40	Greenwood Historic District	Greenwood Historic District	September 26, 2022 (#100008199)	100-300 blks. North Greenwood Ave. and 419 North Elgin Ave. 36°09′35″N 95°59′10″W	Tulsa	
41	Harwelden	Harwelden	February 8, 1978 (#78002271)	2210 S. Main St. 36°07′54″N 95°59′15″W	Tulsa	
42	Haskell State School of Agriculture	Haskell State School of Agriculture	December 19, 1978 (#78002268)	808 E. College St. 36°03′12″N 95°46′49″W	Broken Arrow	Demolished in 1989. The cornerstone and a historical marker remains.
43	Hawk Dairies	Hawk Dairies	October 5, 2026 (#08000854)	2415 E. 11th St. S. 36°08′52″N 95°57′27″W	Tulsa	As of listing date, expected to be converted into apartment-style living spaces
44	Hewgley Terrace	Hewgley Terrace	September 24, 2021 (#100007010)	420 South Lawton Ave. 36°08′54″N 96°00′04″W	Tulsa	
45	Holland Hall Upper School		June 8, 2021 (#100006633)	5666 East 81st St. 36°02′33″N 95°54′59″W	Tulsa	
46	Holy Family Cathedral, Rectory, and School	Holy Family Cathedral, Rectory, and School	February 11, 1982 (#82003704)	W. 8th St. and S. Boulder Ave. 36°08′51″N 95°59′23″W	Tulsa	
47	Hooper Brothers Coffee Company Building	Hooper Brothers Coffee Company Building	December 19, 1978 (#78002272)	731-733 E. Admiral Boulevard; 36°09′33″N 95°58′55″W	Tulsa	
48	Robert J. LaFortune Tower	Robert J. LaFortune Tower	April 17, 2025 (#100011716)	1725 Southwest Blvd. 36°08′11″N 96°00′24″W	Tulsa	
49	Robert Lawton Jones House	Robert Lawton Jones House	December 13, 2001 (#01001355)	1916 E. 47th St. 36°05′40″N 95°57′47″W	Tulsa	
50	KATY Railroad Historic District	KATY Railroad Historic District	December 13, 2010 (#10001012)	Roughly along W. Easton and the old KATY Railroad Right-of-Way between N. Cheyenne and N. Boston Aves. 36°09′37″N 95°59′51″W	Tulsa	
51	Maple Ridge Historic Residential District	Maple Ridge Historic Residential District	April 6, 1983 (#83002138)	Roughly bounded by Hazel Boulevard, S. Peoria Ave., 14th St., and Railroad; 36°07′58″N 95°58′48″W	Tulsa	
52	Mayo Building	Mayo Building	December 4, 2008 (#08001152)	420 S. Main St. 36°09′08″N 95°59′26″W	Tulsa	
53	Mayo Hotel	Mayo Hotel	June 27, 1980 (#80003303)	115 W. 5th St. 36°09′03″N 95°59′31″W	Tulsa	
54	Mayo Motor Inn	Mayo Motor Inn	August 26, 2008 (#08000850)	416 S. Cheyenne Ave. 36°09′05″N 95°59′34″W	Tulsa	
55	James H. McBirney House	James H. McBirney House	November 13, 1976 (#76001577)	1414 S. Galveston; 36°08′30″N 95°59′52″W	Tulsa	
56	McFarlin Building	McFarlin Building	December 6, 1979 (#79002030)	11 E. 5th St. 36°09′06″N 95°59′22″W	Tulsa	
57	Robert M. McFarlin House	Robert M. McFarlin House	January 25, 1979 (#79002031)	1610 Carson; 36°08′20″N 95°59′26″W	Tulsa	
58	McGregor House	McGregor House	June 9, 2014 (#14000299)	1401 S. Quaker Ave. 36°08′32″N 95°58′27″W	Tulsa	
59	B.W. McLean House and Office	B.W. McLean House and Office	March 22, 1991 (#91000309)	123 E. A St. 36°01′25″N 95°58′05″W	Jenks	
60	Mincks-Adams Hotel	Mincks-Adams Hotel	November 7, 1978 (#78002273)	403 S. Cheyenne Ave. 36°09′05″N 95°59′34″W	Tulsa	
61	Moore Manor	Moore Manor	February 19, 1982 (#82003705)	228 W. 17th Pl. 36°08′12″N 95°59′26″W	Tulsa	
62	Morrow Home Place	Morrow Home Place	September 3, 2010 (#10000627)	13200 E. 126th St. N. 36°20′12″N 95°49′36″W	Collinsville	Purchased by the Tulsa Community Foundation; soon to be a public museum.
63	Mount Zion Baptist Church	Mount Zion Baptist Church	September 5, 2008 (#08000847)	419 N. Elgin E. Ave. 36°09′45″N 95°59′25″W	Tulsa	
64	North Cheyenne Avenue Historic District	North Cheyenne Avenue Historic District	December 13, 2010 (#10001011)	Roughly along East/West Frisco Tracks and alley between W. Archer and W. Brady Sts., N. Denver and alley between N. Boulder; 36°09′27″N 95°59′46″W	Tulsa	
65	Oil Capital Historic District	Oil Capital Historic District	December 13, 2010 (#10001013)	Roughly between 3rd and 7th Sts. and Cincinnati and Cheyenne Aves. 36°09′05″N 95°59′24″W	Tulsa	
66	Oklahoma Iron Works-Bethlehem Supply Company Building	Oklahoma Iron Works-Bethlehem Supply Company Building	March 9, 2015 (#15000067)	118 N. Lansing Ave. 36°09′45″N 95°58′56″W	Tulsa	
67	Oklahoma Natural Gas Company Building	Oklahoma Natural Gas Company Building	April 10, 1984 (#84003458)	624 S. Boston Ave. 36°09′00″N 95°59′18″W	Tulsa	
68	Owen Park Historic District	Owen Park Historic District	September 9, 1999 (#99001137)	Roughly bounded by U.S. 412, Zenith Ave., Edison Ave., and Interstate 244; 36°09′32″N 96°00′41″W	Tulsa	
69	Page Memorial Library	Page Memorial Library	March 18, 1999 (#99000352)	6 E. Broadway; 36°08′23″N 96°06′35″W	Sand Springs	
70	Foster B. Parriott House	Foster B. Parriott House	September 14, 2002 (#02000971)	2216 E. 30th St. 36°07′13″N 95°57′35″W	Tulsa	
71	Petroleum Building	Petroleum Building	April 15, 1982 (#82003706)	420 S. Boulder St. 36°09′04″N 95°59′29″W	Tulsa	
72	Philcade Building	Philcade Building	September 18, 1986 (#86002196)	511 S. Boston Ave. 36°09′03″N 95°59′26″W	Tulsa	
73	Phillips 66 Station No. 473	Phillips 66 Station No. 473	December 6, 2004 (#04001332)	2224 E. Admiral Boulevard; 36°09′34″N 95°57′34″W	Tulsa	
74	Waite Phillips Mansion	Waite Phillips Mansion	December 1, 1978 (#78002274)	2727 S. Rockford Rd. 36°07′22″N 95°58′10″W	Tulsa	Now the Philbrook Museum of Art
75	Philtower	Philtower	August 29, 1979 (#79002032)	427 S. Boston Ave. 36°09′07″N 95°59′19″W	Tulsa	
76	Pierce Block	Pierce Block	December 11, 1979 (#79002033)	301 E. 3rd St. 36°09′18″N 95°59′13″W	Tulsa	
77	Pioneer Plaza		September 24, 2021 (#100007009)	901 North Elgin Ave. 36°10′01″N 95°59′28″W	Tulsa	
78	Public Service of Oklahoma Building	Public Service of Oklahoma Building	April 10, 1984 (#84003443)	600 S. Main St. 36°09′00″N 95°59′22″W	Tulsa	Renamed Art Deco Lofts and Apartments
79	Ranch Acres Historic District	Ranch Acres Historic District	December 12, 2007 (#07001268)	Roughly bounded by E. 31 St., S. Harvard Ave, E. 41st St., and S. Delaware and S. Florence Aves. 36°06′41″N 95°56′32″W	Tulsa	
80	Riverside Historic Residential District	Riverside Historic Residential District	March 31, 2005 (#04000937)	Roughly bounded by the Midland Railway Bike Trail, Riverside Dr., S. Boston Ave., E. 24th St., and E. 21st St. 36°07′37″N 95°59′05″W	Tulsa	Harwelden is within the Riverside Historic Residential District
81	Riverside Studio	Riverside Studio	June 14, 2001 (#01000656)	1381 Riverside Dr. 36°06′44″N 95°59′47″W	Tulsa	
82	Riverview Historic District	Riverview Historic District	September 6, 2007 (#07000906)	Roughly bounded by W. 12th and 13th Sts., S., east of S. Elwood Ave., W., W. 14th Place, S., S. Riverside Dr., and S. Jackson Ave. 36°08′30″N 95°59′43″W	Tulsa	
83	St. John Vianney Training School for Girls		June 7, 1983 (#83002139)	4001 E. 101st St. 36°01′04″N 95°56′13″W	Tulsa	
84	Sally Ann Apartments	Sally Ann Apartments	September 8, 2015 (#15000581)	1309, 1311, 1313, 1310, 1312, 1314 S. Jackson Ave. 36°08′37″N 96°00′02″W	Tulsa	
85	Sand Springs Power Plant	Sand Springs Power Plant	September 3, 1998 (#98001148)	221 S. Main St. 36°08′02″N 96°06′32″W	Sand Springs	Vacant, for sale as of 2-2026
86	Sinclair Service Station	Sinclair Service Station	December 13, 1996 (#96001486)	3501 E. 11th St. 36°08′53″N 95°56′15″W	Tulsa	
87	Sixth Street Commercial/Residential Historic District	Sixth Street Commercial/Residential Historic District	September 3, 2009 (#09000687)	Roughly along E. 6th St. from S. Peoria Ave. to the north/south alley between Quaker and Quincy Aves. 36°09′07″N 95°58′31″W	Tulsa	
88	William G. Skelly House	William G. Skelly House	November 28, 1978 (#78002275)	2101 S. Madison; 36°07′59″N 95°58′48″W	Tulsa	
89	Sophian Plaza	Sophian Plaza	December 13, 2011 (#11000896)	1500 S. Frisco Ave., W. 36°08′25″N 95°59′44″W	Tulsa	
90	Southwestern Bell Main Dial Building	Southwestern Bell Main Dial Building	June 22, 1984 (#84003445)	424 Detroit Ave. 36°09′10″N 95°59′14″W	Tulsa	
91	Stonebraker Heights Historic District	Stonebraker Heights Historic District	September 6, 2007 (#07000917)	Roughly bounded by W. 15th St., S., an alley east of South Cheyenne Ave., W., W. 17th St., S., and S. Elwood Ave., W. 36°08′21″N 95°59′28″W	Tulsa	
92	Swan Lake Historic District	Swan Lake Historic District	February 20, 1998 (#98000140)	Roughly bounded by E. 15th St., S. Utica Ave., E. 21st St., and S. Peoria Ave. 36°08′17″N 95°58′11″W	Tulsa	
93	Tracy Park Historic District	Tracy Park Historic District	September 20, 1982 (#82003707)	Roughly bounded by Norfolk, Peoria, 11th, and 13th Sts. 36°08′45″N 95°58′37″W	Tulsa	
94	Tribune Building	Tribune Building	July 16, 1979 (#79003644)	20 E. Archer St. 36°09′26″N 95°59′30″W	Tulsa	
95	Tulsa Boys' Home Historic District	Tulsa Boys' Home Historic District	December 1, 2020 (#100005864)	Bounded by East 8th St., South Quincy Ave., East 7th St., and South Rockford Ave. 36°09′05″N 95°58′21″W	Tulsa	
96	Tulsa Civic Center Historic District	Tulsa Civic Center Historic District	January 4, 2012 (#11000641)	Between W. 3rd & 6th Sts. & S. Houston & Denver Aves. 36°08′42″N 95°59′46″W	Tulsa	
97	Tulsa Fire Alarm Building	Tulsa Fire Alarm Building	September 2, 2003 (#03000879)	1010 E. 8th St. 36°09′00″N 95°58′43″W	Tulsa	
98	Tulsa Monument Company	Tulsa Monument Company	September 4, 2008 (#08000849)	1735 E. 11th St., S. 36°08′53″N 95°57′57″W	Tulsa	
99	Tulsa Municipal Building	Tulsa Municipal Building	July 18, 1975 (#75001574)	124 E. 4th St. 36°09′10″N 95°59′18″W	Tulsa	
100	United States Post Office and Courthouse	United States Post Office and Courthouse	March 24, 2000 (#00000244)	224 S. Boulder Ave. 36°09′12″N 95°59′33″W	Tulsa	
101	James Alexander Veasey House	James Alexander Veasey House	July 27, 1989 (#89001006)	1802 S. Cheyenne Ave. 36°08′12″N 95°59′23″W	Tulsa	
102	Vernon A.M.E. Church	Vernon A.M.E. Church	August 17, 2018 (#100002547)	311 N Greenwood Ave. 36°09′42″N 95°59′12″W	Tulsa	
103	Vickery Phillips 66 Station	Vickery Phillips 66 Station	March 3, 2004 (#04000135)	602 S. Elgin; 36°09′06″N 95°59′04″W	Tulsa	
104	Daniel Webster High School Historic District	Daniel Webster High School Historic District	June 10, 2021 (#100006632)	1919 West 40th St. 36°06′20″N 96°00′54″W	Tulsa	
105	Westhope	Westhope	April 10, 1975 (#75001575)	3704 S. Birmingham St. 36°06′35″N 95°57′14″W	Tulsa	
106	White City Historic District	White City Historic District	June 14, 2001 (#01000663)	Roughly bounded by E. 2nd St., S. Fulton Ave., the former St. Louis – San Francisco railroad tracks, E. 11th St., and S. Yale Ave. 36°09′04″N 95°55′03″W	Tulsa	
107	Whittier Square Historic District	Whittier Square Historic District	June 15, 2012 (#12000348)	Roughly between Lewis, & Zunis Aves., E. 1st St., & I-244; 36°09′33″N 95°57′34″W	Tulsa	part of the Route 66 and Associated Resources in Oklahoma AD Multiple Property Submission
108	Will Rogers High School	Will Rogers High School	September 6, 2007 (#07000918)	3909 E. 5th Place; 36°09′13″N 95°55′58″W	Tulsa	
109	Woodward Park and Gardens Historic District	Woodward Park and Gardens Historic District	March 11, 2014 (#14000054)	2101 & 2435 S. Peoria Ave. 36°07′53″N 95°58′25″W	Tulsa	
110	Yorktown Historic District	Yorktown Historic District	June 20, 2002 (#02000657)	Roughly bounded by 16th and 17th Sts., Victor and Wheeling Aves., 20th St., and Lewis Ave. 36°08′12″N 95°57′44″W	Tulsa	

== See also ==
- List of National Historic Landmarks in Oklahoma
- National Register of Historic Places listings in Oklahoma
