= Tulsa County, Oklahoma =

County in the United States

- County
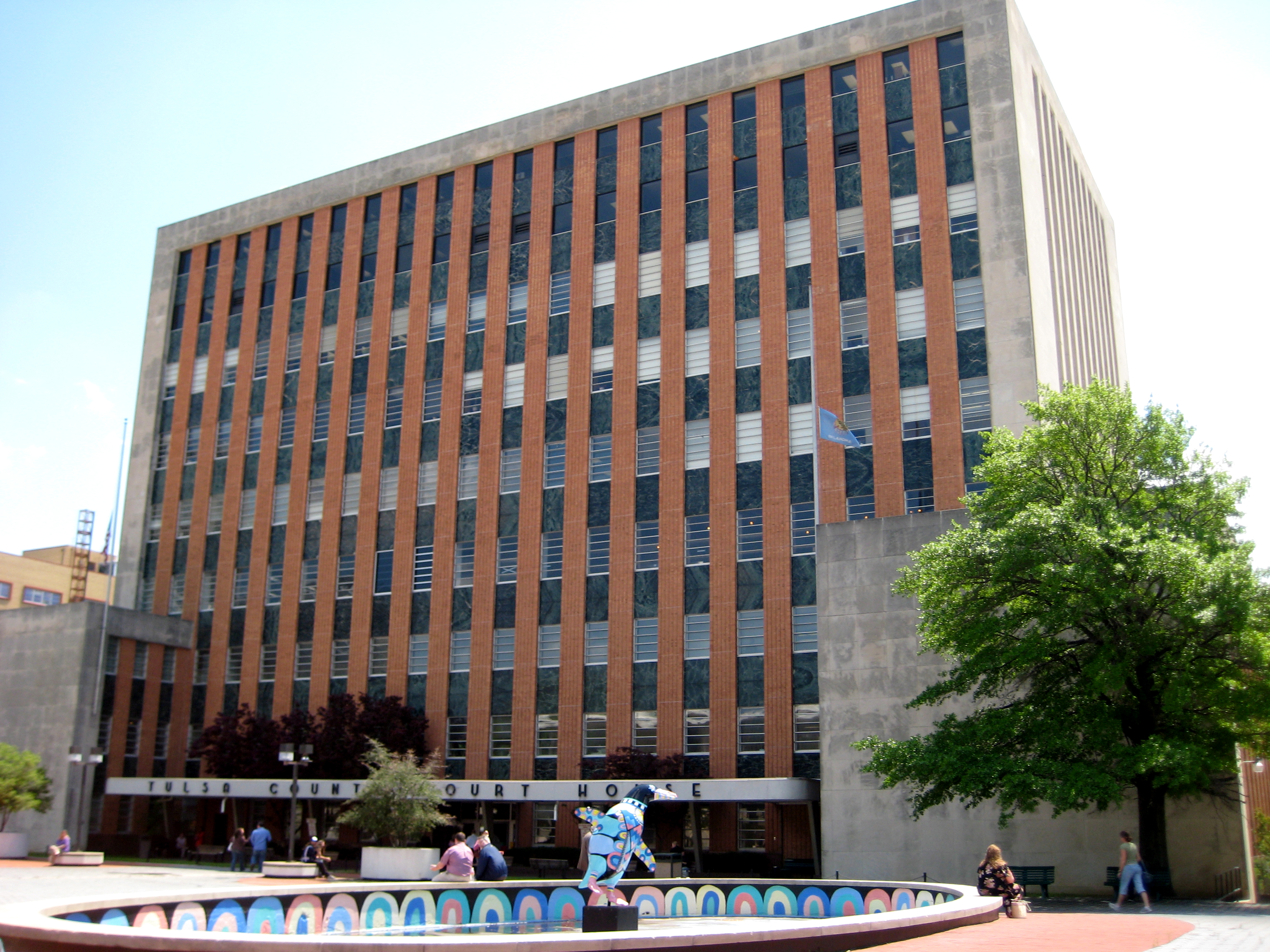
- Tulsa County Courthouse

- Flag

- Location within the U.S. state of Oklahoma
- Coordinates: 36°07′N 95°56′W
- Country: United States
- State: Oklahoma
- Founded: 1907
- Named for: city of Tulsa
- Seat: Tulsa
- Largest city: Tulsa

Area
  - Total: 587 sq mi (1,520 km^{2})
  - Land: 570 sq mi (1,500 km^{2})
  - Water: 17 sq mi (44 km^{2}) 2.9%

Population (2020)
  - Total: 669,279
  - Estimate (2025): 698,782 ▲
  - Density: 1,216.7/sq mi (469.8/km^{2})
- Time zone: UTC−6 (Central)
  - Summer (DST): UTC−5 (CDT)
- Congressional district: 1st
- Website: www.tulsacounty.org

Tulsa County is a county located in the U.S. state of Oklahoma. As of the 2020 census, the population was 669,279, making it the second-most populous county in the state, behind only Oklahoma County. Its county seat and largest city is Tulsa, the second-largest city in the state. Founded at statehood, in 1907, it was named after the previously established city of Tulsa. Before statehood, the area was part of both the Creek Nation and the Cooweescoowee District of Cherokee Nation in Indian Territory. Tulsa County is included in the Tulsa metropolitan statistical area. Tulsa County is notable for being the most densely populated county in the state. Tulsa County also ranks as having the highest income.

== History ==
The history of Tulsa County greatly overlaps the history of the city of Tulsa. This section addresses events that largely occurred outside the present city limits of Tulsa.

=== Lasley Vore Site ===
The Lasley Vore Site, along the Arkansas River south of Tulsa, was claimed by University of Tulsa anthropologist George Odell to be the most likely place where Jean-Baptiste Bénard de la Harpe first encountered a group of Wichita people in 1719. Odell's statement was based on finding both Wichita and French artifacts there during an architectural dig in 1988.

=== Old Fort Arbuckle ===
The U. S. Government's removal of Native American tribes from the southeastern United States to "Indian Territory" did not take into account how that would impact the lives and attitudes of the nomadic tribes that already used the same land as their hunting grounds. At first, Creek immigrants stayed close to Fort Gibson, near the confluence of the Arkansas and Verdigris rivers. However, the government encouraged newer immigrants to move farther up the Arkansas. The Osage tribe had agreed to leave the land near the Verdigris, but had not moved far and soon threatened the new Creek settlements.

In 1831, a party led by Rev. Isaac McCoy and Lt. James L. Dawson blazed a trail up the north side of the Arkansas from Fort Gibson to its junction with the Cimarron River. In 1832, Dawson was sent again to select sites for military posts. One of his recommended sites was about two and a half miles downstream from the Cimarron River junction. The following year, Brevet Major George Birch and two companies of the 7th Infantry Regiment followed the "Dawson Road" to the aforementioned site. Flattering his former commanding officer, General Matthew Arbuckle, Birch named the site "Fort Arbuckle."

According to Encyclopedia of Oklahoma History and Culture, the fort was about 8 miles (13 km) west of the present city of Sand Springs, Oklahoma. Author James Gardner visited the site in the early 1930s. His article describing the visit includes an old map showing the fort located on the north bank of the Arkansas River near Sand Creek, just south of the line separating Tulsa County and Osage County. After ground was cleared and a blockhouse built, Fort Arbuckle was abandoned November 11, 1834. The remnants of stockade and some chimneys could still be seen nearly a hundred years later. The site was submerged when Keystone Lake was built.

=== Battle of Chusto-Talasah ===
At the outbreak of the Civil War in 1861, many Creeks and Seminoles in Indian Territory, led by Opothleyahola, retained their allegiance to the U. S. Government. In November 1861, Confederate Col. Douglas H. Cooper led a Confederate force against the Union supporters with the purpose of either compelling their submission or driving them out of the country. The first clash, known as the Battle of Round Mountain, occurred November 19, 1861. Although the Unionists successfully withstood the attack and mounted a counterattack, the Confederates claimed a strategic victory because the Unionists were forced to withdraw.

The next battle occurred December 9, 1861. Col. Cooper's force attacked the Unionists at Chusto-Talasah (Caving Banks) on the Horseshoe Bend of Bird Creek in what is now Tulsa County. The Confederates drove the Unionists across Bird Creek, but could not pursue, because they were short of ammunition. Still, the Confederates could claim victory.

=== Coming of the railroads ===
The Atlantic and Pacific Railroad had extended its main line in Indian Territory from Vinita to Tulsa in 1883, where it stopped on the east side of the Arkansas River. The company, which later merged into the St. Louis and San Francisco Railway (familiarly known as the Frisco), then built a steel bridge across the river to extend the line to Red Fork. This bridge allowed cattlemen to load their animals onto the railroad west of the Arkansas instead of fording the river, as had been the practice previously. It also provided a safer and more convenient way to bring workers from Tulsa to the oil field after the 1901 discovery of oil in Red Fork.

=== Oil Boom ===
A wildcat well named Sue Bland No. 1 hit paydirt at 540 feet on June 25, 1901, as a gusher. The well was on the property of Sue A. Bland (née Davis), located near the community of Red Fork. Mrs. Bland was a Creek citizen and wife of Dr. John C. W. Bland, the first practicing physician in Tulsa. The property was Mrs. Bland's homestead allotment. Oil produced by the well was shipped in barrels to the nearest refinery in Kansas, where it was sold for $1.00 a barrel.

Other producing wells followed soon after. The next big strike in Tulsa County was the Glenn Pool Oil Reserve in the vicinity of where Glenpool, Oklahoma was later founded..

Ironically, while the city of Tulsa claimed to be "Oil Capital of the World" for much of the 20th century, a city ordinance banned drilling for oil within the city limits.

=== Tulsa County Court House ===
In 1911–1912, Tulsa County built a court house in Tulsa on the northeast corner of Sixth Street and South Boulder Avenue. Yule marble was used in its construction. The land had previously been the site of a mansion owned by George Perryman and his wife. This was the court house where a mob of white residents gathered on May 31, 1921, threatening to lynch a young black man held in the top-floor jail. It was the beginning of the Tulsa Race Massacre.

An advertisement for bids specified that the building should be fireproof, built of either reinforced concrete or steel and concrete. The size was to be 120 by 120 feet (37 by 37 m) with three floors and a full basement. Cost of the building was not to exceed $200,000. The jail on the top floor was not to exceed $25,000.

The building continued to serve until the present court house building (shown above) opened at 515 South Denver. The old building was then demolished and the land was sold to private investors. The land is now the site of the Bank of America building, completed in 1967.

=== 1921 race massacre ===
In the early 20th century, Tulsa was home to the "Black Wall Street", one of the most prosperous Black communities in the United States at the time. Located in the Greenwood neighborhood, it was the site of the Tulsa Race Massacre, said to be "the single worst incident of racial violence in American history", in which mobs of white Tulsans killed black Tulsans, looted and robbed the black community, and burned down homes and businesses. Sixteen hours of massacring on May 31 and June 1, 1921, ended only when National Guardsmen were brought in by the Governor. An official report later claimed that 23 Black and 16 white citizens were killed, but other estimates suggest as many as 300 people died, most of them Black. Over 800 people were admitted to local hospitals with injuries, and an estimated 1000 Black people were left homeless as 35 city blocks, composed of 1,256 residences, were destroyed by fire. Property damage was estimated at $1.8 million. Efforts to obtain reparations for survivors of the violence have been unsuccessful, but the events were re-examined by the city and state in the early 21st century, acknowledging the terrible actions that had taken place.

== Geography and climate ==
According to the U.S. Census Bureau, the county has a total area of 587 square miles (1,520 km^{2}), of which 570 square miles (1,500 km^{2}) is land and 17 square miles (44 km^{2}) (2.9%) is water.

The Arkansas River drains most of the county. Keystone Lake, formed by a dam on the Arkansas River, lies partially in the county. Bird Creek and the Caney River, tributaries of the Verdigris River drain the northern part of the county.

Monthly Normal and Record High and Low Temperatures
Month	Jan	Feb	Mar	Apr	May	Jun	Jul	Aug	Sep	Oct	Nov	Dec
Rec High °F	79	90	96	102	96	103	112	110	109	98	87	80
Norm High °F	46.5	52.9	62.4	72.1	79.6	88	93.8	93.2	84.1	74	60	49.6
Norm Low °F	26.3	31.1	40.3	49.5	59	67.9	73.1	71.2	62.9	51.1	39.3	29.8
Rec Low °F	-8	-11	-3	22	35	49	51	52	35	18	10	-8
Precip (in)	1.6	1.95	3.57	3.95	6.11	4.72	2.96	2.85	4.76	4.05	3.47	2.43
Source: USTravelWeather.com

=== Adjacent counties ===
- Washington County (north)
- Rogers County (northeast)
- Wagoner County (southeast)
- Okmulgee County (south)
- Creek County (west)
- Pawnee County (northwest)
- Osage County (northwest)

=== Major highways ===
- I-44 / SH-66
- I-244
- I-444 (unsigned)
- US 64
- US 75
- US 169
- US 412
- SH-11
- SH-20
- SH-51
- SH-67
- SH-97
- SH-117
- SH-151
- SH-266
- SH-344 (signed as Gilcrease Expressway and Turnpike)
- Creek Turnpike
- L.L. Tisdale Parkway

=== Transit ===
- Tulsa Transit
- Greyhound Lines
- Jefferson Lines
- Tulsa Bus Station

== Demographics ==
Historical population
Census	Pop.	Note	%±
1910	34,995		—
1920	109,023		211.5%
1930	187,574		72.0%
1940	193,363		3.1%
1950	251,686		30.2%
1960	346,038		37.5%
1970	401,663		16.1%
1980	470,593		17.2%
1990	503,341		7.0%
2000	563,299		11.9%
2010	603,403		7.1%
2020	669,279		10.9%
2025 (est.)	698,782	▲	4.4%
U.S. Decennial Census; 1790-1960 1900-1990; 1990-2000 2010-2019

=== 2021 estimates ===
In 2021, there were 295,350 households with a median house value of $168,800 and a median rent of $929. Its median household income was $60,382 and 14.7% of the population lived at or below the poverty line.

=== 2020 census ===
As of the 2020 census, the county had a population of 669,279. Of the residents, 24.4% were under the age of 18 and 15.3% were 65 years of age or older; the median age was 36.3 years. For every 100 females there were 95.8 males, and for every 100 females age 18 and over there were 93.0 males.

The racial makeup of the county was 58.4% White, 10.1% Black or African American, 6.0% American Indian and Alaska Native, 3.8% Asian, 7.2% from some other race, and 14.5% from two or more races. Hispanic or Latino residents of any race comprised 14.9% of the population.

There were 266,836 households in the county, of which 31.2% had children under the age of 18 living with them and 29.4% had a female householder with no spouse or partner present. About 30.8% of all households were made up of individuals and 11.2% had someone living alone who was 65 years of age or older.

There were 292,375 housing units, of which 8.7% were vacant. Among occupied housing units, 57.9% were owner-occupied and 42.1% were renter-occupied. The homeowner vacancy rate was 1.8% and the rental vacancy rate was 10.2%.

=== 2010 census ===
At the 2010 census, there were 603,403 people, 241,737 households, and 154,084 families residing in the county. The population density was 1,059 inhabitants per square mile (409/km^{2}). The racial makeup of the county was 69.2% White, 10.7% Black or African American, 6.0% Native American, 2.3% Asian, 0.1% Pacific Islander, 5.8% from other races, and 5.8% from two or more races. 11.0% of the population were Hispanic or Latino of any race (8.8% Mexican). 14.2% were of German, 12.3% Irish, 8.8% English, 8.5% American, 2.3% French, and 2.3% Scottish ancestries. 88.3% spoke English, 8.1% Spanish, and 0.4% Vietnamese as their first language.

As of 2010, there were 241,737 households, out of which 30.1% had children under the age of 18 living with them, 45.3% were married couples living together, 13.3% had a female householder with no husband present, and 36.3% were non-families. 29.60% of all households were made up of individuals, and 22% had someone living alone who was 65 years of age or older. The average household size was 2.46 and the average family size was 3.07.

As of 2010 in the county, the population was spread out, with 26.30% under the age of 18, 10.00% from 18 to 24, 30.40% from 25 to 44, 21.60% from 45 to 64, and 11.80% who were 65 years of age or older. The median age was 34 years. For every 100 females, there were 94.20 males. For every 100 females age 18 and over, there were 90.90 males.

As of 2010, the median income for a household in the county was $47,005, and the median income for a family was $60,093. The per capita income for the county was $27,425. About 11.0% of families and 15.1% of the population were below the poverty line, including 22.6% of those under age 18 and 8.2% of those age 65 or over. Of the county's population over the age of 25, 29.2% held a bachelor's degree or higher, and 88.2% have a high school diploma or equivalent.

== Government ==
Tulsa County has nine elected county officials: three county commissioners, a county sheriff, a district attorney, an assessor, a treasurer, a county clerk, and a county court clerk.

County officials
Position	Official	First elected	Next Re-election Year	Party
County Commissioner District 1	Stan Sallee	2018	2026	Rep
County Commissioner District 2	Lonnie Sims	2024	2028	Rep
County Commissioner District 3	Kelly Dunkerley	2023	2026	Rep
District Attorney	Steve Kunzweiler	2015	2026	Rep
County Assessor	John A. Wright	2018	2026	Rep
County Clerk	Michael Willis	2017	2028	Rep
County Court Clerk	Don Newberry	2017	2028	Rep
County Sheriff	Vic Regalado	2017	2028	Rep
County Treasurer	John Fothergill	2020	2026	Rep

Oklahoma's 14th Judicial District, which includes Tulsa and Pawnee County, has 14 elected district judges. 13 of the judges are elected from Tulsa County. The one elected Associate Judge for Tulsa County is Cliff Smith of Tulsa.

County Judges
Position	Official	First elected	Next Re-election Year	Hometown
Office 1	Caroline Wall	2010	2026	Tulsa
Office 2	Sharron Holmes	2014	2026	Tulsa
Office 3	Tracy Priddy	2018	2026	Tulsa
Office 4	Daman H. Cantrell	1998	2026	Owasso
Office 5 (Pawnee County)	Michelle L. Bodine-Keely	2020	2026	Cleveland
Office 6	Kelly Greenough	2016	2026	Tulsa
Office 7	William LaFortune	2014	2026	Tulsa
Office 8	Doug Drummond	2014	2026	Tulsa
Office 9	Richard L. Hathcoat	2023	2026	Tulsa
Office 10	Dawn Moody	2018	2026	Tulsa
Office 11	Rebecca Nightingale	2002	2026	Tulsa
Office 12	Kevin Gray	2022	2026	Tulsa
Office 13	David Guten	2022	2026	Tulsa
Office 14	Kurt G. Glassco	2009	2026	Tulsa

=== Politics ===
Tulsa County is very conservative for an urban county; it has voted Republican in every presidential election since 1940. The county's Republican bent predates Oklahoma's swing toward the GOP. Oklahoma has voted Republican in every presidential election since 1952, except in 1964 when Democrat Lyndon B. Johnson won in a landslide.

George H. W. Bush in 1992 remains the only Republican since Alf Landon in 1936 to fail to obtain a majority in the county, and even then only because of Ross Perot’s strong third-party candidacy.

In 2020, Joe Biden became the first Democrat since Lyndon Johnson in 1964 to win more than 40% of the vote in Tulsa County, and only the second to do so since 1948. It is one of only two counties in the state, alongside Oklahoma County, where Biden outperformed Southerner Jimmy Carter's 1976 margin, when he narrowly lost the state.

In 2022, Democratic gubernatorial candidate (and county resident) Joy Hofmeister narrowly carried the county, 49.1-48.9, against incumbent Republican Kevin Stitt. This was the first time Tulsa County had backed a Democratic gubernatorial candidate since 2006, and the first time in its history that it had ever backed a losing Democrat for governor.

In 2024, Democratic nominee Kamala Harris won 41.3% of the vote in the county, the highest vote share since 1964. The county swung towards Democrats by less than 1 percentage point from 2020 to 2024. The county still remained strongly Republican.

The city of Tulsa is consistently conservative and regularly votes Republican in presidential and other statewide races. In recent years, this advantage has considerably narrowed. Its urban core is a swing region. After voting for Donald Trump in 2016 by four points, it swung to a six-point win for Joe Biden in 2020, and also backed Drew Edmondson for Governor in 2018 by 13 points. The rest of the city, however, remains very strongly Republican.

In February 2020, registered Republicans were reduced from a majority to a plurality in the county's voter registration.

Voter registration and party enrollment as of January 15, 2025
Party	Number of Voters	Percentage
Republican	195,133	47.96%
Democratic	119,120	29.29%
Libertarian	4,207	1.03%
Unaffiliated	88,390	21.72%
Total	406,850	100%

United States presidential election results for Tulsa County, Oklahoma
Year	Republican		Democratic		Third party(ies)	
Year	No.	%	No.	%	No.	%
1908	2,150	46.04%	2,292	49.08%	228	4.88%
1912	2,029	37.95%	2,747	51.37%	571	10.68%
1916	3,857	41.74%	4,497	48.67%	886	9.59%
1920	14,357	57.43%	10,025	40.10%	617	2.47%
1924	19,537	55.54%	14,377	40.87%	1,265	3.60%
1928	38,769	70.49%	16,062	29.20%	167	0.30%
1932	25,541	41.96%	35,330	58.04%	0	0.00%
1936	28,759	40.88%	41,256	58.65%	328	0.47%
1940	40,342	54.83%	33,098	44.99%	135	0.18%
1944	42,663	56.00%	33,436	43.89%	89	0.12%
1948	42,892	52.67%	38,548	47.33%	0	0.00%
1952	73,862	61.25%	46,728	38.75%	0	0.00%
1956	83,219	65.51%	43,805	34.49%	0	0.00%
1960	89,899	63.03%	52,725	36.97%	0	0.00%
1964	76,770	55.53%	61,484	44.47%	0	0.00%
1968	81,476	57.11%	32,748	22.95%	28,443	19.94%
1972	125,278	77.75%	32,779	20.34%	3,069	1.90%
1976	108,653	61.63%	65,298	37.04%	2,349	1.33%
1980	124,643	66.25%	53,438	28.40%	10,067	5.35%
1984	159,549	72.90%	58,274	26.62%	1,049	0.48%
1988	127,512	64.48%	69,044	34.91%	1,207	0.61%
1992	117,465	49.13%	71,165	29.77%	50,438	21.10%
1996	111,243	53.65%	76,924	37.10%	19,189	9.25%
2000	134,152	61.34%	81,656	37.34%	2,883	1.32%
2004	163,452	64.43%	90,220	35.57%	0	0.00%
2008	158,363	62.23%	96,133	37.77%	0	0.00%
2012	145,062	63.68%	82,744	36.32%	0	0.00%
2016	144,258	58.39%	87,847	35.56%	14,949	6.05%
2020	150,574	56.46%	108,996	40.87%	7,108	2.67%
2024	145,241	56.53%	106,105	41.30%	5,593	2.18%

== Parks and recreation ==
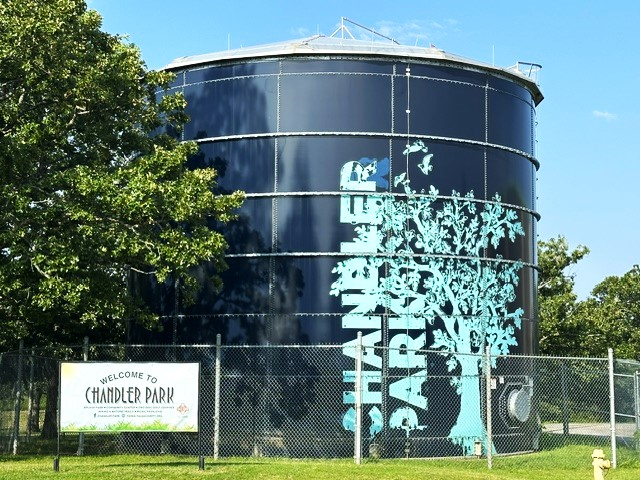
Chandler Park water tank and signage, 7-2026

Some Tulsa-area parks are run directly by Tulsa County. These include the 270-acre LaFortune Park in Midtown Tulsa (complete with an 18-hole championship golf course), and the 192-acre Chandler Park.

River Parks was established in 1974 as a joint operation of the City of Tulsa and Tulsa County, with funding from both governments as well as private entities. It is not a part of the Tulsa Parks and Recreation Department, but is managed by the River Parks Authority. It is a series of linear parks that run adjacent to the Arkansas River for about 10 miles (16 km) from downtown to the Jenks bridge. Since 2007 a significant portion of the River Parks area has been renovated with new trails, landscaping and playground equipment. The River Parks Turkey Mountain Urban Wilderness Area on the west side of the Arkansas River in south Tulsa is a 300 acres (120 ha) area that contains over 45 miles (72 km) of dirt trails available for hiking, trail running, mountain biking and horseback riding. The "Tulsa Townies" organization provides bicycles that may be checked out for use. There are three kiosks in the parks where bicycles may be obtained or returned.

== Communities ==
=== Cities ===
- Bixby (part)
- Broken Arrow (part)
- Collinsville
- Glenpool
- Jenks
- Owasso (part)
- Sand Springs (part)
- Sapulpa (part)
- Skiatook (part)
- Tulsa (county seat) (part)

=== Towns ===
- Liberty (part)
- Lotsee
- Sperry

=== Census-designated places ===
- Leonard
- Oakhurst
- Turley

=== Unincorporated communities ===
- Berryhill
- Garnett
- Lake
- Mingo

=== Former communities ===
- Alsuma - Annexed by Tulsa in 1968.
- Carbondale - Annexed by Tulsa in 1928.
- Dawson - Annexed by Tulsa in 1949.
- Keystone - Submerged by Keystone Lake, whose construction began in 1958.
- North Tulsa - Annexed by Tulsa in 1904.
- Prattville - Annexed by Sand Springs in 1965.
- Red Fork - Annexed by Tulsa in 1927.
- South Haven - Annexed by Tulsa in 1966.

== Education ==
=== K-12 education ===
Public school districts include:

- Berryhill Public Schools
- Bixby Public Schools
- Broken Arrow Public Schools
- Collinsville Public Schools
- Glenpool Public Schools
- Jenks Public Schools
- Liberty Public Schools
- Owasso Public Schools
- Sand Springs Public Schools (operates Charles Page High School)
- Skiatook Public Schools
- Sperry Public Schools
- Tulsa Public Schools
- Union Public Schools
- Keystone Public School (elementary only)

=== Colleges and universities ===
Public institutions:

- University of Tulsa
- Tulsa Community College

Private institutions:

- Oral Roberts University

== NRHP sites ==
The following sites in Tulsa County are listed on the National Register of Historic Places:

- 66 Motel, Tulsa
- Ambassador Hotel, Tulsa
- Bishop Kelley High School
- Boston Avenue United Methodist Church, Tulsa
- Boulder-on-the-Park, Tulsa
- Brady Heights Historic District, Tulsa
- Broken Arrow Elementary--Junior High School, Broken Arrow
- Cain's Dancing Academy, Tulsa
- The Church Studio, Tulsa
- Circle Theater, Tulsa
- Clinton-Hardy House, Tulsa
- Tulsa Convention Hall, Tulsa
- Cosden Building, Tulsa
- Creek Council Oak Tree, Tulsa
- Dawson School, Tulsa
- Carl K. Dresser House, Tulsa
- Eleventh Street Arkansas River Bridge, Tulsa
- Fort Arbuckle Site, Sand Springs
- Gillette Historic District, Tulsa
- Gillette-Tyrell Building, Tulsa (Later named the Pythian Building)
- Harwelden Mansion, Tulsa
- Haskell State School of Agriculture, Broken Arrow
- Holy Family Cathedral, Rectory, and School, Tulsa
- Hooper Brothers Coffee Company Building, Tulsa
- Robert Lawton Jones House, Tulsa
- Maple Ridge Historic Residential District, Tulsa
- Mayo Building, Tulsa
- Mayo Hotel, Tulsa
- Mayo Motor Inn
- James H. McBirney House, Tulsa
- McFarlin Building, Tulsa
- Robert M. McFarlin House, Tulsa
- B. W. McLean House and Office, Jenks
- Mincks-Adams Hotel, Tulsa
- Moore Manor, Tulsa
- Mount Zion Baptist Church, Tulsa
- North Cheyenne Historic District, Tulsa
- Oil Capital of the World Historic District
- Oklahoma Natural Gas Company Building, Tulsa
- Owen Park Historic District, Tulsa
- Page Memorial Library, Sand Springs
- Foster B. Parriott House, Tulsa
- Petroleum Building, Tulsa
- Philcade Building, Tulsa
- Phillips 66 Station 473, Tulsa
- Waite Phillips Mansion (now Philbrook Museum), Tulsa
- Philtower, Tulsa
- Pierce Block, Tulsa
- Public Service of Oklahoma Building, Tulsa
- Ranch Acres Historic Residential District, Tulsa
- Riverside Historic Residential District, Tulsa
- Riverside Studio, Tulsa
- Sand Springs Power Plant, Sand Springs
- Sinclair Service Station, Tulsa
- William G. Skelly House, Tulsa
- Southwestern Bell Main Dial Building, Tulsa
- St. John Vianney Training School for Girls, Tulsa
- Swan Lake Historic District, Tulsa
- Tracy Park Historic District
- Tribune Building, Tulsa
- Tulsa Fire Alarm Building, Tulsa
- Tulsa Municipal Building, Tulsa
- United States Post Office and Courthouse, Tulsa
- James Alexander Veasey House, Tulsa
- Vickery Phillips 66 Station, Tulsa
- Westhope, Tulsa
- White City Historic District, Tulsa
- Woodward Park and Gardens Historic District
- Yorktown Historic District, Tulsa

== See also ==
- Lasley Vore Site
- Yule marble
