= Yorktown Historic District =

Yorktown Historic District may refer to the following places:

- Yorktown Historic District (Tulsa, Oklahoma), listed on the National Register of Historic Places
- Yorktown Historic District (Philadelphia), listed on the National Register of Historic Places
