= Three Forks (Oklahoma) =

Three Forks Oklahoma is an imprecisely defined area of what is now eastern Oklahoma, around the confluence of the Arkansas, Verdigris, and Grand Rivers. (Note: Grand River is the modern name for the Neosho River, downstream of the confluence of the Neosho and Spring Rivers in Oklahoma.)

== History ==
The term, "Three Forks," was apparently used to designate this area as early as 1719, when the French trader Bernard de la Harpe traveled through the area, meeting and trading with members of the Wichita tribe at a place on the Arkansas River immediately south of the present city of Tulsa. (Note: The site is now known as the Lasley Vore Site.)

Located in a transition between the Ozark Mountains on the east and the Cross Timbers/Sandstone Hills on the West, this area is the wettest part of Oklahoma, commonly receiving at least 40 inches (1,000 mm) of precipitation per year. Bison and other fur-bearing animals were plentiful, making this a prime hunting area for centuries. Archaeologists have found evidence of human settlements dating back to at least 5000 B.C.

According to Oklahoma historian Grant Foreman, it was the Spanish government who in 1802, granted a monopoly on trading with the Osage Indians, who then claimed control over the area, to Manuel Lisa, Charles Sanguinet, Francis M. Benoit and Gregoire Sarpy. This effectively undercut Pierre Chouteau, a Frenchman and resident of St. Louis, who enjoyed such a monopoly for the previous twenty years. Chouteau had acquired much influence with the Osage, and refused to take this situation lying down. He persuaded about two thousand of their number to pick a new chief named Cashesegra, or Big Track and move from their homes on the Missouri River to the Three Forks, where the Arkansas, Grand and Verdigris Rivers joined. This area was under at least nominal control of the French government, rather than the Spanish, so Chouteau was legally free to trade with these Osage.

Foreman also wrote that after the Louisiana Purchase became a reality, the Osages were notified by an official letter. The Osage, by then led by Chief Clermont, simply threw the letter into a fire. They refused to accept that their friends, the French, would sell their land, and that they must swear loyalty to the United States. According to Foreman, this response was given to Lewis and Clark while their expedition was encamped on the Osage River on May 31, 1804.

The Osages who moved to the Three Forks fared well. Temperamental and warlike, they soon pushed out the Washitas and intimidated smaller tribes who already lived in the area. Then they dominated the fur trade with the French who came to Chouteau's trading post. It was not long before Cherokees who had already left their ancestral homes in the Southeastern states to settle in the Arkansas Territory began to encroach on the Osage's newly acquired hunting ground. One source claims that between 1790 and 1820, around 5,000 Cherokee settlers built farms and ranches on land they now claimed as their tribe's territory. These two tribes engaged in a 10-year war, in which neither would submit to the other, but the Osage finally realized they could not win. (Note: The fighting became so bloody that the U.S. Government felt compelled to intervene. The Army sent General Matthew Arbuckle to Three Forks for the purpose of building Fort Gibson on the Verdigris River in 1824 to keep the warring sides apart.) A settlement was reached whereby the Osage accepted a large reservation elsewhere. (Note: The Osage reservation occupies the entirety of present-day Osage County, Oklahoma. A large tract of the Three Forks became part of the Cherokee Nation, when the tribe relocated after the Trail of Tears.)

Three Forks is still used in the 21st Century in reference to the same geographic area, now covering at least part of present-day Cherokee, Muskogee and Wagoner Counties. When the McClellan-Kerr Arkansas River Navigation System became operational in 1971, an important segment of the Port of Muskogee was formally named Three Forks Port.
