= 66 Motel =

66 Motel is the name of various independent tourist lodgings on the former U.S. Route 66 in the United States:

- 66 Motel (Needles), on the Arizona border in Needles, California
- 66 Motel (Tulsa) (built circa-1933, demolished June 26, 2001) as a historically-listed site in Tulsa, Oklahoma
- Route 66 Motel, in Kingman, Arizona

== See also ==
- Buildings and structures on U.S. Route 66
