= Cheairs Furniture Company Building =

1934 building in Tulsa, Oklahoma, US

- U.S. National Register of Historic Places
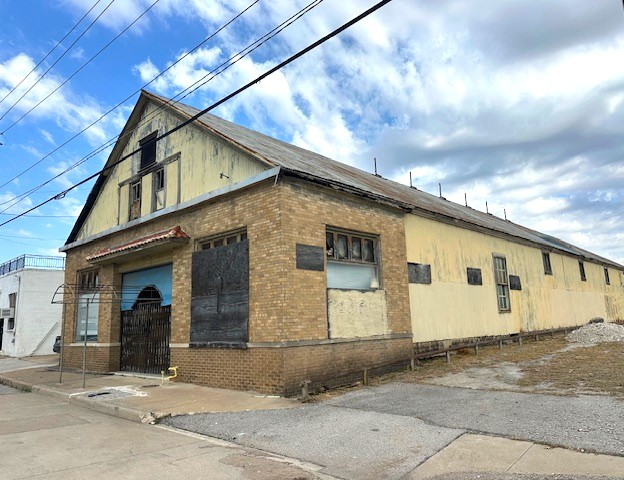

- Location within Oklahoma Location within the United States
- Location: 537 South Kenosha Ave., Tulsa, Oklahoma, U.S.
- Coordinates: 36.153162°N 95.981833°W
- Built: 1934
- NRHP reference No.: 100002546
- Added to NRHP: June 11, 2018

The Cheairs Furniture Company Building is a historic building in Tulsa, Oklahoma, U.S.. It was listed on the National Register of Historic Places in 2018, for its role in commercial growth and the development of downtown Tulsa.

The Cheairs Furniture Company was founded by James Osgood Cheairs in 1934, during the Great Depression. It is one of the few surviving structures from the 1930s in this neighborhood.

== See also ==
- National Register of Historic Places listings in Tulsa County, Oklahoma
- 66 Motel (Tulsa)
