= Sinclair Building =

Sinclair Building or Sinclair Oil Building may refer to:

- Sinclair Centre, Vancouver, British Columbia
- Smulekoffs Furniture Store, Cedar Rapids, Iowa, formerly known as the Sinclair Building
- Sinclair, Rooney & Co. Building, Buffalo, New York
- 600 Fifth Avenue at Rockefeller Center, Manhattan, New York, formerly known as the Sinclair Oil Building
- Liberty Tower (Manhattan), New York, formerly known as the Sinclair Oil Building
- Sinclair House (Manhattan hotel)
- Sinclair Building (Tulsa, Oklahoma)
- Sinclair Building (Fort Worth), Texas

== See also ==
- Sinclair Oil Corporation
- Sinclair Service Station (disambiguation)
- Sinclair House (disambiguation)
