= Sinclair Service Station =

Sinclair Service Station may refer to:

- Sinclair Service Station (Tulsa, Oklahoma), listed on the National Register of Historic Places (NRHP) in Tulsa County
- Sinclair Service Station (Ridgeland, South Carolina), NRHP-listed
- Sinclair Service Station (Spring Hill, Florida), NRHP-listed
- Old Sinclair Station, Bryan, Texas, NRHP-listed

== See also ==
- List of historic filling stations
- Sinclair Building (disambiguation)
