= John T. Blair =

American architect (1885–1976)

William G. Skelly House

John Thomas Blair (1885–1976), most commonly known as John T. Blair, was an architect and builder in Tulsa, Oklahoma. He was the 4th licensed architect in Oklahoma.

Some of his work is listed on the U.S. National Register of Historic Places.

The McGuire House, a 1915 Prairie Style house designed by him, which was the first house built in the Cedar Ridge area of Tulsa, is the 2012 Tulsa designer showcase house of the year.

Works include:

- McGuire House, Prairie Style, (1915) 1132 East 18th Street, Tulsa, OK
- James Alexander Veasey House, Colonial Revival, 1802 S. Cheyenne Ave. Tulsa, OK, NRHP-listed (included in the Buena Vista Park Historic District, also NRHP-listed)
- William G. Skelly House, Classical Revival, built 1923, at 2101 S. Madison, Tulsa, OK, NRHP-listed
- One or more works in Maple Ridge Historic Residential District, roughly bounded by Hazel Blvd., S. Peoria Ave., 14th St., and Railroad, Tulsa OK, NRHP-listed
