= Sinclair House =

Sinclair House may refer to:

- Upton Sinclair House, Monrovia, California, listed on the National Register of Historic Places (NRHP)
- Reginald Sinclaire House, Larkspur, Colorado, NRHP-listed
- Dr. Archibald Neil Sinclair House, Honolulu, Hawaii, NRHP-listed
- T. M. Sinclair Mansion, Cedar Rapids, Iowa, NRHP-listed
- Harry F. Sinclair House, New York, New York, NRHP-listed
- Sinclair House (Manhattan hotel) (c.1787-1908), New York, New York

== See also ==
- Sinclair Building (disambiguation)
- Sinclair Service Station (disambiguation)
