= Cities Service Station =

Cities Service Station may refer to:

- Mount Ida Cities Service Filling Station, Mount Ida, Arkansas, listed on the National Register of Historic Places (NRHP)
- Murfreesboro Cities Service Station, Murfreesboro, Arkansas, NRHP-listed
- Rison Cities Service Station, Rison, Arkansas, NRHP-listed
- Cities Service Station (Afton, Oklahoma), NRHP-listed
- Avant's Cities Service Station, El Reno, Oklahoma, NRHP-listed
- Cities Service Station No. 8, Tulsa, Oklahoma, NRHP-listed

== See also ==
- List of historic filling stations
