= Cities Service Station No. 8 =

- Cities Service Station #8
- U.S. National Register of Historic Places
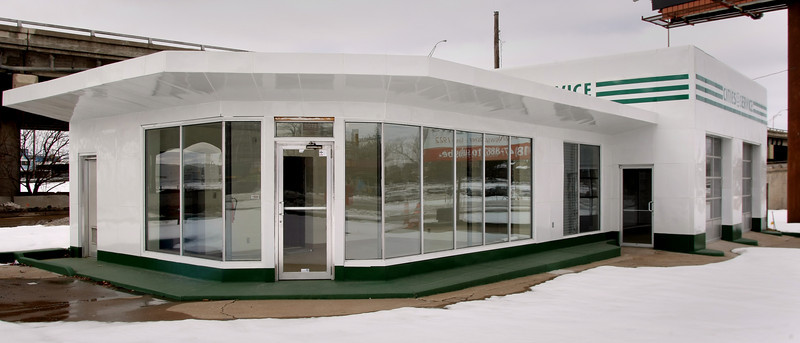

- Location within Oklahoma
- Location: 1648 SW Boulevard, Tulsa, Oklahoma
- Coordinates: 36°08′17″N 96°00′26″W
- Area: less than one acre
- Built: 1940
- Built by: Cities Service (now Citgo)
- Architectural style: Modern Movement
- MPS: Route 66 and Associated Resources in Oklahoma AD MPS
- NRHP reference No.: 11000080
- Added to NRHP: March 14, 2011

The Cities Service Station #8, at 1648 SW Boulevard in Tulsa, Oklahoma, was built in 1940 by Cities Service (later known as "Citgo")in the Modern Movement style. It was listed on the National Register of Historic Places in 2011.

Route 66

== See also ==
- Cities Service Station (disambiguation), which lists other historic Citgo stations
- 66 Motel (Tulsa)
