= Tulsa County Clerk =

The Tulsa County Clerk is an elected official in Tulsa County, Oklahoma, responsible for maintaining county records, processing public documents, and serving as custodian of the county's business history and real estate transactions.

== Divisions of the Tulsa County Clerk's Office ==
The Tulsa County Clerk's Office in Oklahoma is organized into several specialized divisions that manage a variety of governmental and administrative functions. These divisions ensure compliance with legal and financial standards while providing services to county departments, other governmental entities, and the public.

=== Accounting ===
The Accounting Division manages the payment of invoices for all Tulsa County offices and departments.

=== Administration and Support ===
The Administration and Support Division handles statutory functions assigned to the Tulsa County Clerk’s Office under Oklahoma law. This includes providing secretarial services and maintaining business records for several boards, such as the Board of County Commissioners, Budget Board, Board of Tax Roll Corrections, Excise Board, Equalization Board, and the Employees Retirement System of Tulsa County.

=== Budget ===
The Budget Division oversees the preparation and administration of the Tulsa County budget. Its responsibilities include drafting budget reports, amendments, and submissions. The division also provides administrative support to the Tulsa County Budget Board.

=== Financial Services ===
The Financial Services Division is responsible for preparing the Annual Comprehensive Financial Report for Tulsa County, as well as financial reports for entities such as the Tulsa County Industrial Authority.

=== Payroll ===
The Payroll Division manages the preparation and processing of monthly and bi-weekly payrolls for all Tulsa County government departments and affiliated agencies. This includes administering wage deductions, verifying the reliability of pay data, issuing payroll checks, and maintaining compliance with tax laws. The division also edits existing employee files and maintains necessary payroll documentation.

=== Real Estate Services ===
The Real Estate Services Division is divided into two primary work groups: Recording and Land Records. This division is responsible for processing and preserving documents for public record, including deeds, mortgages, liens, and subdivision plats. It also handles other miscellaneous documents such as military discharge papers.

== Current Tulsa County Clerk ==
Michael Willis currently serves as the Tulsa County Clerk. He was first elected to the position on June 28, 2016. He began his first term on January 2, 2017.

== List of Tulsa County clerks ==
Name	Term
C.F. Rogers	November 18, 1907 – December 2010
R.E. Curran	January 9, 2011 – December 1914
Lewis Cline'	January 4, 1915 – December 1920
O.D. Lawson	January 3, 1921 – December 1923
O.G. Weaver	January 1, 1923 – December 1932
Andy Stokes	January 3, 1933 – December 1950
William P. Gable Jr.	January 1, 1951 – December 1958
Clyde Winterringer	January 5, 1959 – December 1972
Anita Nesbitt	January 2, 1973 – June 1984 (died in office)
Joan Hastings	November 19, 1984 – December 2000
Earlene Wilson	January 1, 2001 – December 2012
Pat Key	January 1, 2013 – December 2016
Michael Willis	January 1, 2017 – Present

== Notable initiatives ==
The Tulsa County Clerk's Office began offering a free record notification service in December 2024 to detect potential fraud.
