= Max Campbell (real estate developer) =

American real estate developer

- Born: 1895
- Died: 1970 (aged 75)

Max Campbell (1895 — 1970) was an American real estate developer. He built the Casa Loma Hotel in Tulsa in 1927.

== Biography ==
Campbell attended Vinita High School, later working at the County Clerk’s Office in Tulsa. In 1916, He enlisted in the U.S. Army.

In 1921, Campbell purchased 10 acres (4 ha) of undeveloped land roughly 3 miles (4 km) east of Downtown Tulsa.

In 1927, Campbell built the Max Campbell building, where the Casa Loma Hotel is located on the property he had purchased.

In 1932, Route 66 was re-aligned to pass beside the hotel, which made the hotel the only full-service hotel on the route in Tulsa.
