= Blue Dome Historic District =

- U.S. National Register of Historic Places
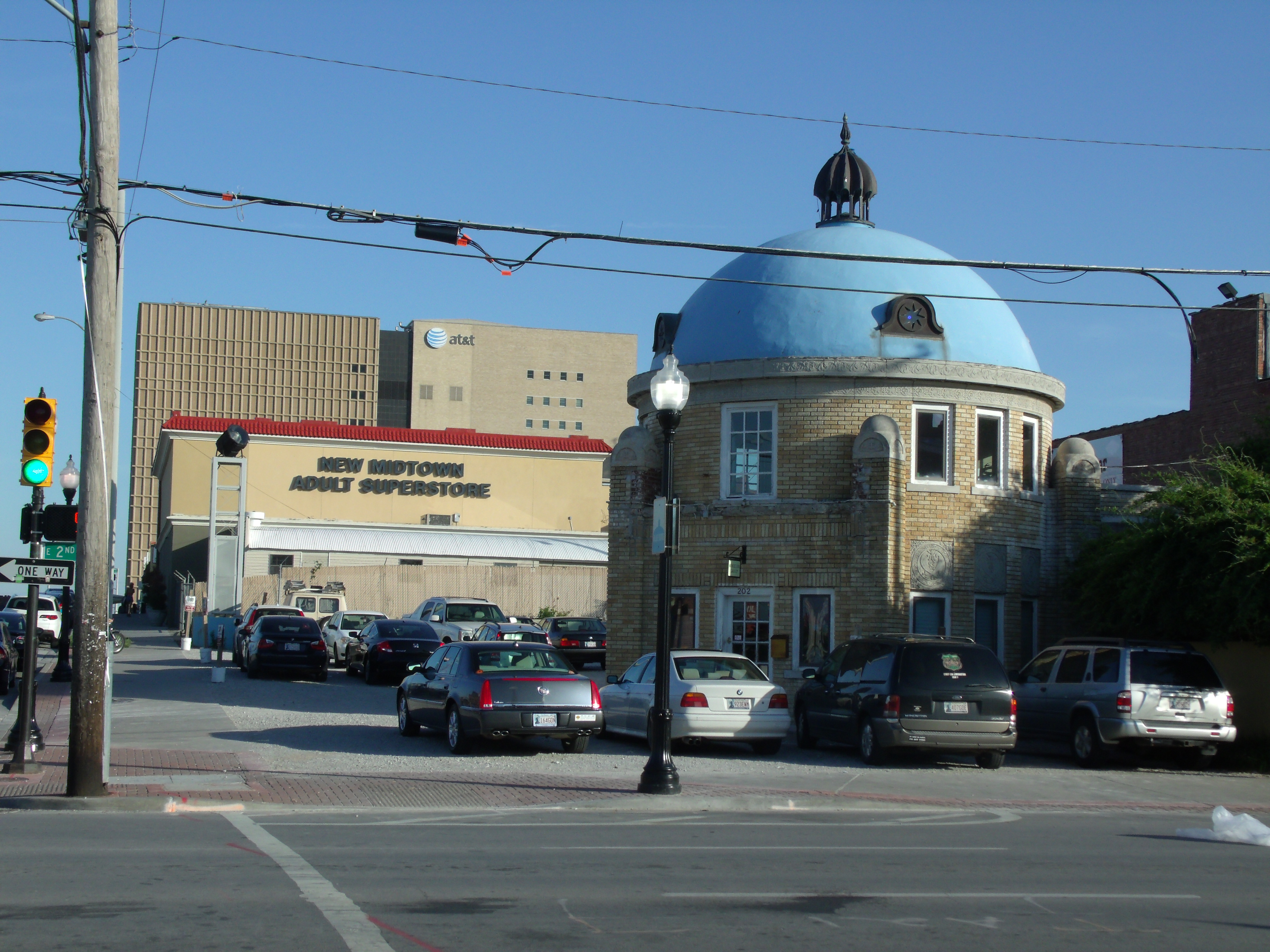
- Blue Dome Building in 2012

- Location within Oklahoma
- Location: Roughly between S. Kenosha & S. Detroit Aves., Frisco RR tracks, & E. 8th St., Tulsa, Oklahoma
- Coordinates: 36.15451°N 95.98469°W
- Area: 59 acres (24 ha)
- Built: 1903
- Architect: Graham, David R. Graham, others
- Architectural style: Modern Movement, Late 19th and Early 20th Century American Movements, mixed
- MPS: Route 66 and Associated Resources in Oklahoma AD MPS
- NRHP reference No.: 11000895
- Added to NRHP: December 13, 2011

The Blue Dome District in Tulsa, Oklahoma is a neighborhood and historic district which was listed on the National Register of Historic Places in 2016. It is a seventeen block area of commercial, industrial, and mixed-use buildings, as well as open spaces, just east of the downtown business area of Tulsa. The listing included 73 resources, including 45 contributing buildings and three contributing structures, on 59 acres (24 ha). The district thrived economically for about seventy years.

The district, located a couple blocks west of Interstate 444, includes 7.5 blocks of two north-south avenues, S. Elgin Ave. and S. Franklin Ave. It is bounded on the east by S. Kenosha Avenue, by S. Eighth Street on the south, by S. Detroit Ave. and S. Elgin Ave. on the west, and by a railroad spur right-of-way on the north.

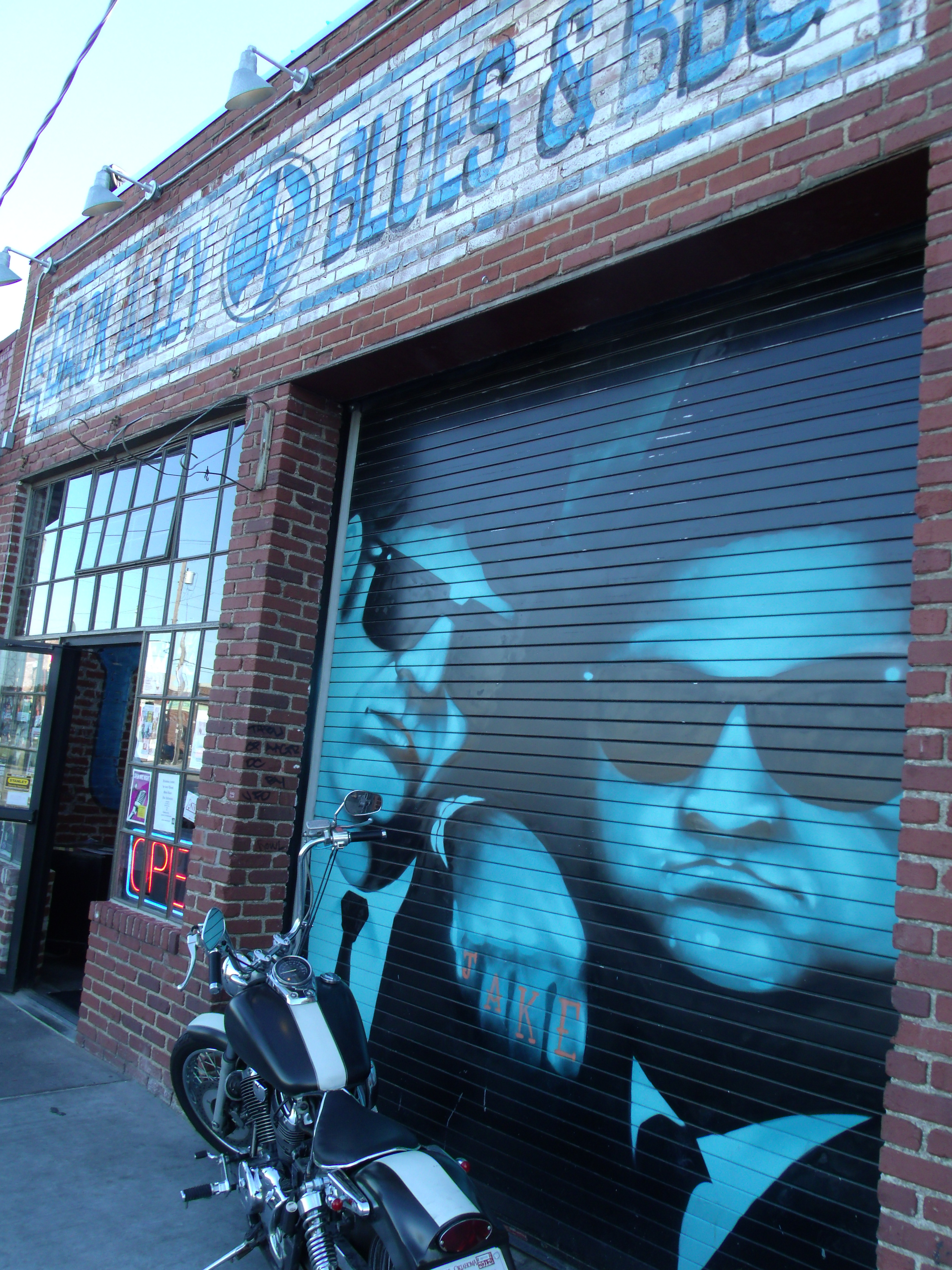
Repurposed building, in 2012

It was deemed significant for its association with transportation and commerce in the development of Tulsa. The first railroad had reached Tulsa in 1882; this area was first directly served in 1903 by the Midland Valley Railroad which built a combination passenger and freight depot that opened c.1904 and a freight depot in 1907.

The Atchison Topeka & Santa Fe Railroad (Santa Fe) reached Tulsa in 1905, and at first sharing tracks, depots and freight yards with Midland Valley. The Santa Fe built a large freight depot and rail yard in 1918, in a two city block area in the district. This established one of the district's larger "permanently" open spaces, and it involved about ten miles of spur tracks.

East Second Street, which crosses the district going east-west, was designated in 1926 to be the official route of Route 66, and this significantly increased traffic and then auto-related services.

Trade in the wholesale businesses using the warehouses prospered through World War II, and then declined as transportation shifted from railroads to trucking.

The district's listing is related to a 1994 study titled "Route 66 and Associated Historic Resources in Oklahoma" and a 2003 extension and update. The first covered transportation and commerce on Route 66 in Oklahoma during 1926-1944. The second expanded coverage to years past 1944 and the expanded the scope "to include broader changes in community, in migration, in transportation networks, in recreation, and in other areas related to the patterns of history associated with Route 66."

== The Blue Dome ==
The Blue Dome
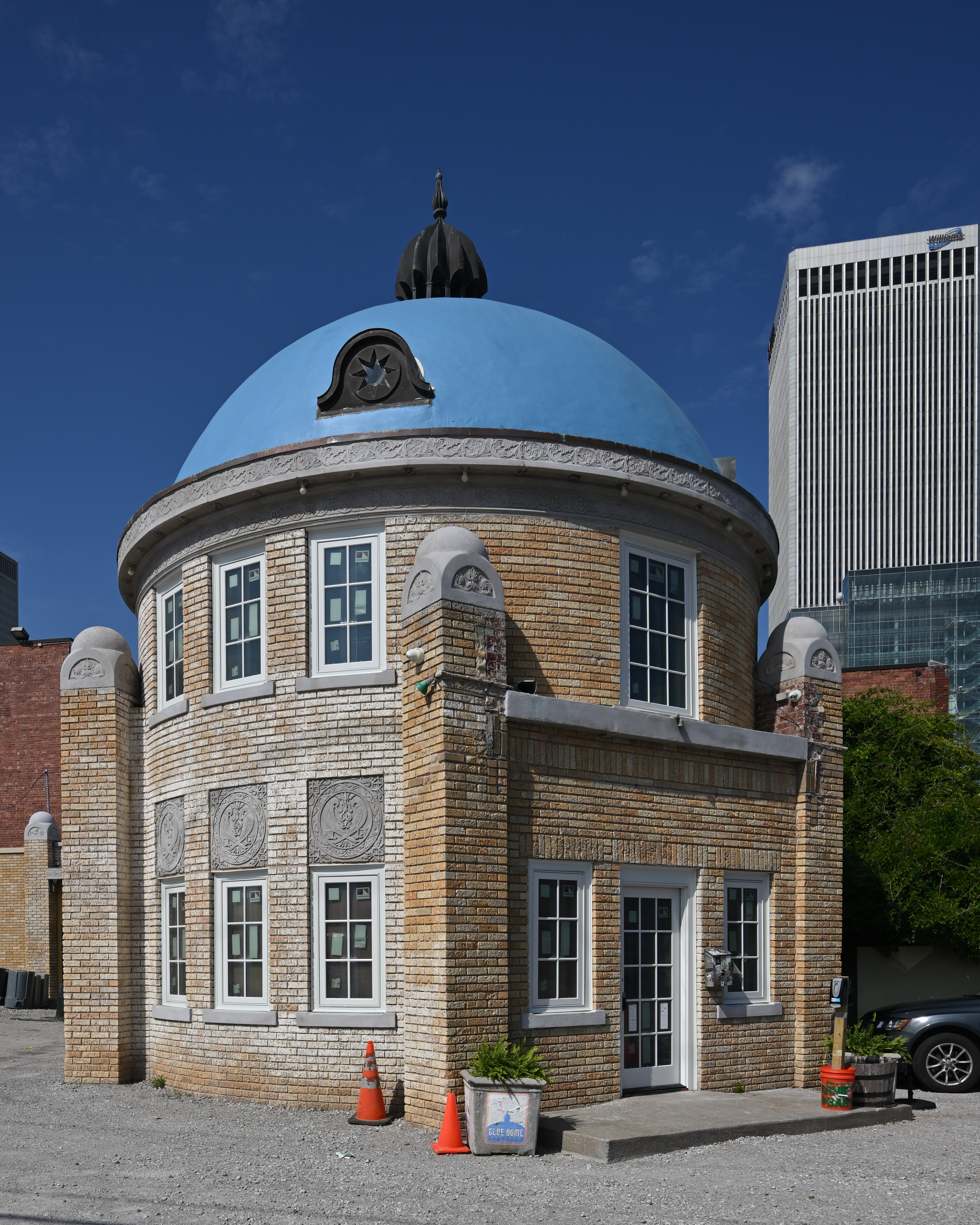
- The Blue Dome in 2026
- Interactive map of The Blue Dome
- Type: Roadside attraction
- Location: Tulsa, Oklahoma

History
- Built: 1924

The district is named for the distinctive Art Deco-style Blue Dome Building at 318 E. 2nd Street, at the corner of South Elgin Avenue, which was a former Gulf Oil gas station and auto garage.

The architects, engineers, and others who designed the buildings are mostly unknown. The architect of the one-story Moderne-style parking garage at 408 S. Frankfort Avenue, however, is known to be David R. Graham.

== See also ==
- Route 66 in Oklahoma
- 66 Motel (Tulsa), west along Route 66
