= Lasley Vore Site =

Archaeological site in Tulsa County, Oklahoma, USA

Site notes
- Archaeologists: Dr. George H. Odell
- Discovered: 1988
- Public access: None

The Lasley Vore Site is an archaeological site near the Arkansas River in Tulsa County, Oklahoma. Based on an archeological study in 1988 conducted by the University of Tulsa, this is believed to be the remains of a Wichita village of about 6,000 people, as described by French explorer and trader Jean-Baptiste Bénard de la Harpe in his record of his 1719 trading expedition to this region. Although no evidence of historic structures was found, investigators did find hearths and pits, and have recovered various Wichita, French and European artifacts that have been dated to the early to mid eighteenth century. The project leader published his findings in a 2002 book.

== Discovery ==
The Lasley Vore Site was discovered in 1988, during an environmental impact assessment for a proposed manufacturing site overlooking the Arkansas River, 13 miles (21 km) south of Tulsa, Oklahoma. The study, which had been commissioned by the Kimberly Clark Corporation, was led by Dr. George H. Odell (1942 - 2011), an anthropology professor at the University of Tulsa. Field work was carried out during May and June, 1988. The tight schedule was dictated by Kimberly-Clark's schedule for constructing a paper products plant on the property.

The site was named for an early landowner, Lasley Vore, a Muscogee man who had settled on it about 1890 and developed a farm. Vore died in 1898, and was buried in a small family cemetery that still existed near the site. (Note: A more exact location for the site is given by Odell as 131st Street and South Yale Avenue in Tulsa.) The house and buildings were sold to J. F. Kay, Sr., who moved in with his wife and son, J. F. Kay Jr. The father continued to farm there until he died in 1955; his widow then moved to Bixby. The house burned down about 1970. The land was used for a dairy farm for a few years, then was bought by Fred Parkhill, owner of a Tulsa liquor store. He owned the property for about 15 years, then sold it to Kimberly-Clark.

Because of the schedule constraints, Odell initially used a Ditch Witch trenching tool to define the extent of the study. Although the company owned a quarter section of land (160 acres), Odell determined by trenching that only an area of 2 - 3 hectares (4.9 - 7.5 acres) was of archaeological interest for study. He had the topsoil removed with a belly loader, to expose the subsoil. (Note: Machines like the trenching tool and the belly loader are more often associated with larger construction projects, while archaeological digs are often performed by hand. The compressed schedule did not allow time for extensive hand digging. Fortunately, a contractor was already using the same equipment to move dirt on another part of the Kimberly-Clark property and readily agreed to perform the work needed by Odell. The property had previously been farmed, so the topsoil had been repeatedly disturbed by plowing.) Stains and smears showed where storage pits, trash pits and hearths had been dug into the subsoil during historic times. Odell reported finding 81 such features.

== Artifacts ==
Many items found at the site included Native American artifacts characteristic of the early to mid 18th century, while others were of European origin during the same period. Radiocarbon dating was used to confirm the time of their origin. Odell suggested that the artifacts suggested that this was a semi-permanent Wichita village that had been visited by a European trading party. Wichita artifacts found at the excavations included hide scrapers, projectile points, bison scapulae hoes, and pottery. French-style trade goods from the 18th century found here included trade beads, axe heads, metal knives, and gun parts.

In his 2002 book, Odell explains that the gun parts were the only artifacts from the Lasley Vore site that could be positively identified as coming from a specific country (France) at a specific time (early 18th century). He said that la Harpe could have brought these parts in 1719. The other artifacts were consistent with La Harpe's description of the village and his mission.

== La Harpe Expedition ==
Based on expedition records, historians have long known that Jean-Baptiste Bénard de la Harpe, a French trader, explorer and nobleman, had led an expedition into what is now Oklahoma in 1718-19. His original objective was to establish a trading post at the site of what became the present city of Texarkana, Arkansas, but he extended his trip as far north as the Arkansas River (which he designated as the Alcansas). After returning to France, the explorer wrote that he and 9 other men, including three Caddo guides, led a train of 22 horses loaded with trade goods; they had come to a native settlement overlooking the river. The town had about 6,000 natives, mostly Tawakoni (a sub-group of the Wichita people), although some were Taovaya (another sub-group of the Wichita).

Harpe's party received a warm welcome, were honored with the calumet ceremony and spent ten days at this location. Meanwhile, about 1,000 more related people arrived at the settlement wanting to see these Europeans, trade, and participate in the festivities. (Note: According to an article in the Encyclopedia of the Great Plains, the calumet ceremony was associated with several days of feasting, gift giving, singing and dancing. It climaxed with the presentation of the calumet (peace pipe), which represented unrelated people becoming one family, thus forming lasting trade bonds.)

== Additional Resource ==
- Odell, George H. La Harpe's Post: Tales of French-Wichita Contact on the Eastern Plains. The University of Alabama Press. Tuscaloosa. ISBN 0-8173-1162-9 (2002).

== See also ==
- Lewis, Anna. "LaHarpe's First Expedition in Oklahoma, 1718-1719." Encyclopedia of Oklahoma History and Culture. Vol. 2, No. 4. December, 1924. p. 331-348.
