= Casa Loma Hotel =

- U.S. National Register of Historic Places
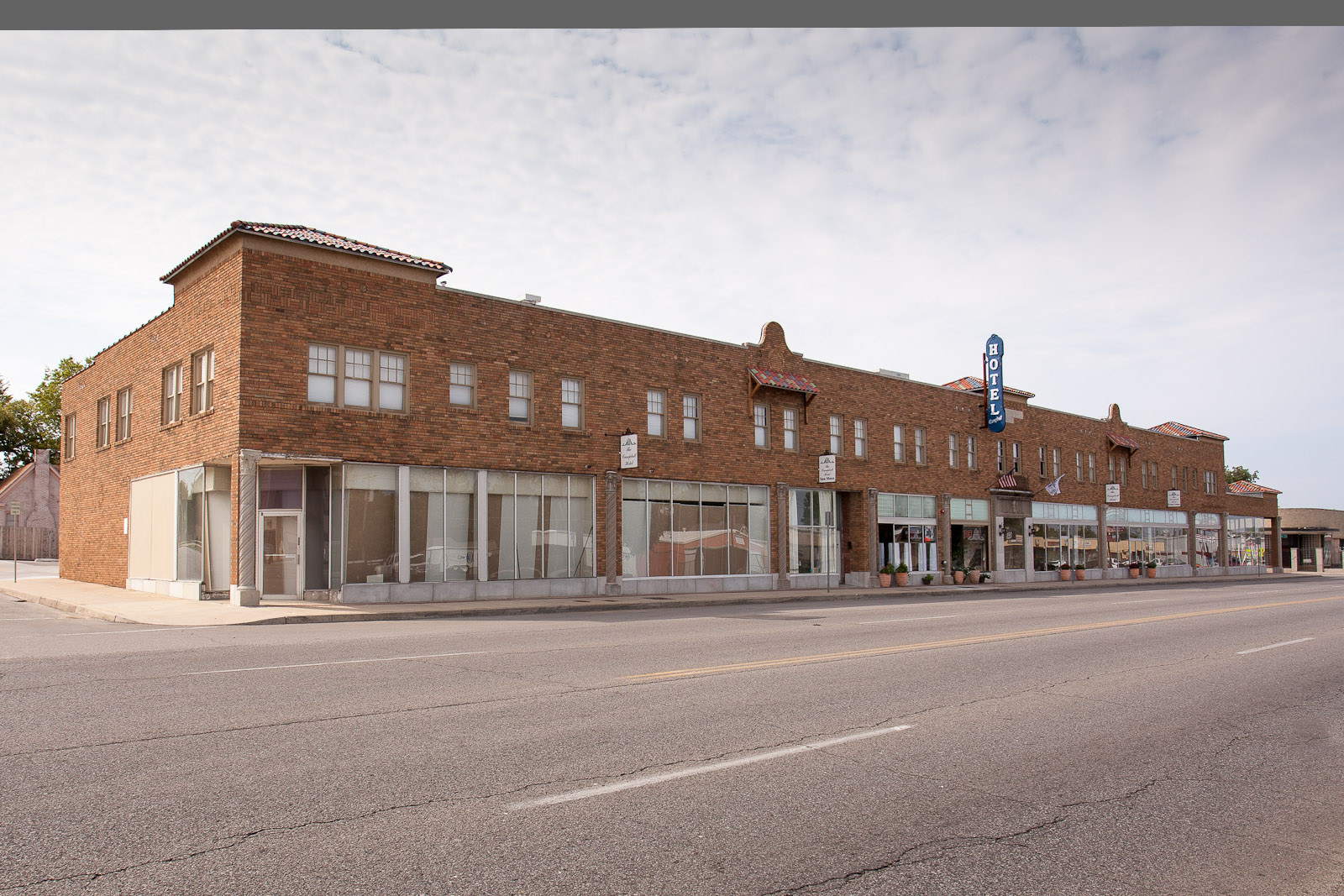

- Location within Oklahoma
- Location: 2626-2648 E Eleventh St, Tulsa, Oklahoma
- Coordinates: 36.14778°N 95.95278°W
- Area: less than one acre
- Built: 1927
- Architectural style: Late 19th and 20th Century Revivals, Mission/Spanish Revival
- MPS: Route 66 and Associated Resources in Oklahoma AD MPS
- NRHP reference No.: 10000805
- Added to NRHP: September 3, 2010

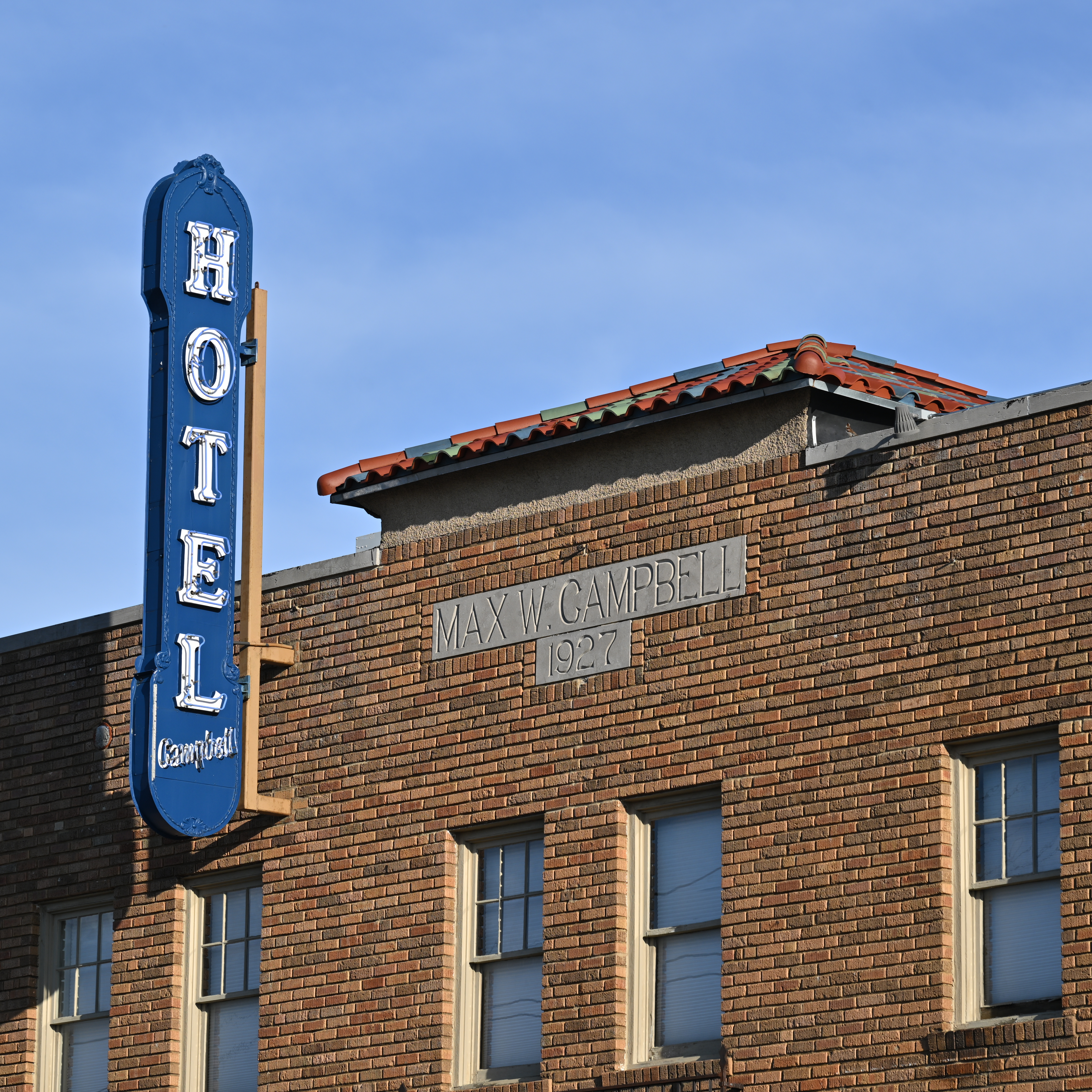
Campbell Hotel sign, Tulsa, OK

The Casa Loma Hotel in Tulsa, Oklahoma, also known as the Max W. Campbell Building or the Campbell Hotel, was built in 1927. It was listed on the National Register of Historic Places in 2010.

It was built by Max Campbell in Spanish Mission style, and was configured to have retail spaces on the first floor and hotel rooms with in-room baths on the second.

It became "the first full-service hotel" on Route 66 in Tulsa, when Route 66 was realigned to run along 11th Street in 1932.

Its listing on the National Register was consistent with two studies, in 1994 and 2003, which evaluated historic resources on Route 66 in Oklahoma.

It is located at 2630 E. Eleventh St. in Tulsa. (Note: NRIS says it is at 2626-2648 E. Eleventh St.; HMDB says 2630.)

== See also ==
- Route 66 in Oklahoma
