= Smulekoffs Furniture Store =

- Sinclair Building–Smulekoffs Furniture Store
- U.S. National Register of Historic Places
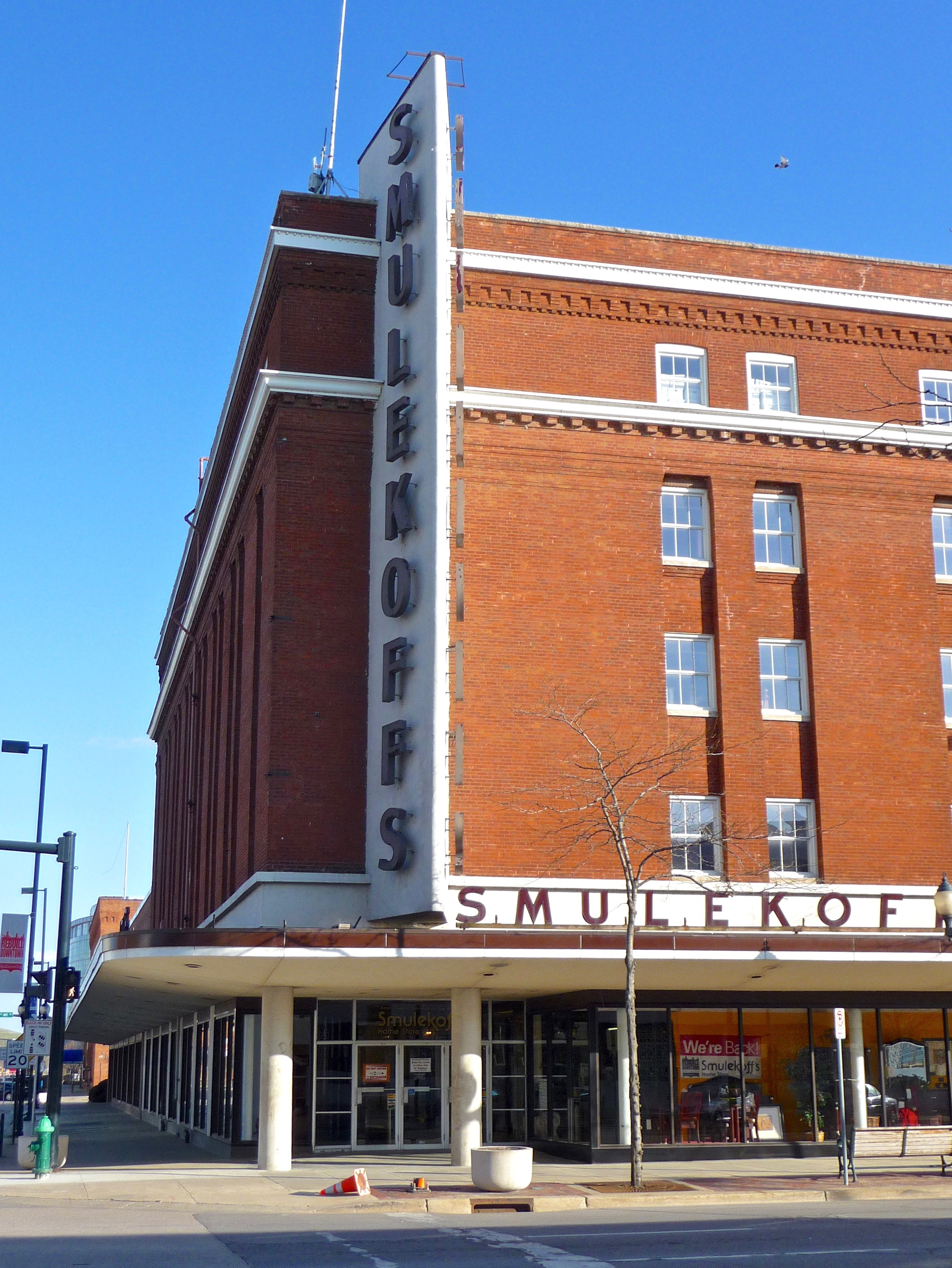

- Location within Iowa Location within the United States
- Location: 97 3rd Ave., SE; Cedar Rapids, Iowa
- Coordinates: 41°58′32.6″N 91°40′04.6″W
- Area: less than one acre
- Built: 1901
- NRHP reference No.: 16000214
- Added to NRHP: May 3, 2016

Smulekoffs Furniture Store, also known as the Sinclair Building, New Sinclair Building, Warfield–Pratt–Howell Co. building and the Churchill Drug Co. building, is a historic building located in Cedar Rapids, Iowa, United States. In 1901 Thomas Sinclair had the original section of this five-story brick structure built. It housed the wholesale grocer Warfield–Pratt–Howell Co. and another wholesaler, the Churchill Drug Co. It was the second of several large-scale warehouse buildings that were constructed in this section of the city along the Cedar River. A spur line of the Chicago, Milwaukee, St. Paul and Pacific Railroad was located at the rear of the building. Rosenbaum Furniture Store bought the building in 1925, and it was converted from warehouse use to retail. In 1941 Smulekoffs Furniture Store took over the building and renovated the main floor. They remained here until 2014. The building is slated for apartments on the upper floors and retail on the main floor. It was listed on the National Register of Historic Places in 2016.
