= Jean-Baptiste Bénard de la Harpe =

French explorer

Jean-Baptiste Bénard de la Harpe (4 February 1683 in Saint-Malo, Province of Brittany – 26 September 1765) was a French explorer who is credited with using the name "Little Rock" in 1722 for a stone outcropping on the bank of the Arkansas River used by early travelers as a landmark. Little Rock, Arkansas was subsequently named for the landmark.

La Harpe was the first known French explorer to set foot in the future state of Oklahoma.

== Explorations in Oklahoma ==
In 1718, La Harpe left France, along with 40 men, and established a trading post in April 1719 on the Red River near what is now Texarkana, Texas. This was near the center of the Caddo Confederacy. La Harpe hoped to establish trade relationships with more distant and unknown Indian tribes and, thus, on 11 August 1718, he set off with 9 men, including 3 Caddo guides, and 22 horses loaded with trade goods to visit a Wichita village to the northwest. (This same year, another French explorer, Claude Charles Du Tisne also journeyed west to visit a different Wichita village in Kansas.)

La Harpe followed the Red River upstream, probably to the vicinity of present-day Idabel, Oklahoma. He then turned north to cross the rugged east–west ridges of the Ouachita Mountains which rise more than 300 metres (980 ft) above the intervening valleys. While in the mountains, La Harpe encountered an Osage war party and narrowly avoided a fight. He also found evidence that a "Cancey" (Apache) war party was in the area. On 3 September, after 23 days of traveling, La Harpe and his party reached a large settlement. Opinions differ as to its location, but after a dig at the Lasley Vore Site in 1988, University of Tulsa anthropologist George H. Odell claimed that archaeological evidence points to it being located about 13 miles (21 km) south of Tulsa, Oklahoma near the western bank of the Arkansas River.

The settlement La Harpe visited consisted of several villages overlooking the river. He estimated the population to be 6 or 7 thousand people of whom the majority were Tawakoni. Other Wichita sub-tribes, especially the Taovaya were also present. The presence of various Wichita tribes suggests that the village was a melting pot and probably a trade center for the entire region. The Wichita gave La Harpe a friendly reception, so friendly that two Black slaves in his group wanted to stay with the Indians rather than return with La Harpe. La Harpe noted that the Wichita had horses, were excellent farmers, and that game in the area was abundant. The Wichita told him they were cannibals. While in the Wichita village, a Chickasaw trader visited. This was disturbing to La Harpe, as the Chickasaw, who lived in Mississippi, were allies of the British. pp. 342–347

La Harpe left to return to his starting point on 13 September 1719 and arrived on 13 October. En route, an Indian man and woman traveling with him were killed by Apaches and La Harpe became lost in the mountains and had to eat his horses. pp. 348–349

The importance of La Harpe's exploration is that it was one of the two first-known French contacts with the Wichita and Apache Indians and the first known French expedition to set foot in the future state of Oklahoma. La Harpe's account of the expedition includes much information about the land he traversed and the Indians he met. The Wichita were probably grouped in such a large village as a defense from slave raids by the Osage and Apache. Within two or three decades the Wichita had moved south to the Red River where they became allies with the Comanche.

== Explorations in Texas ==
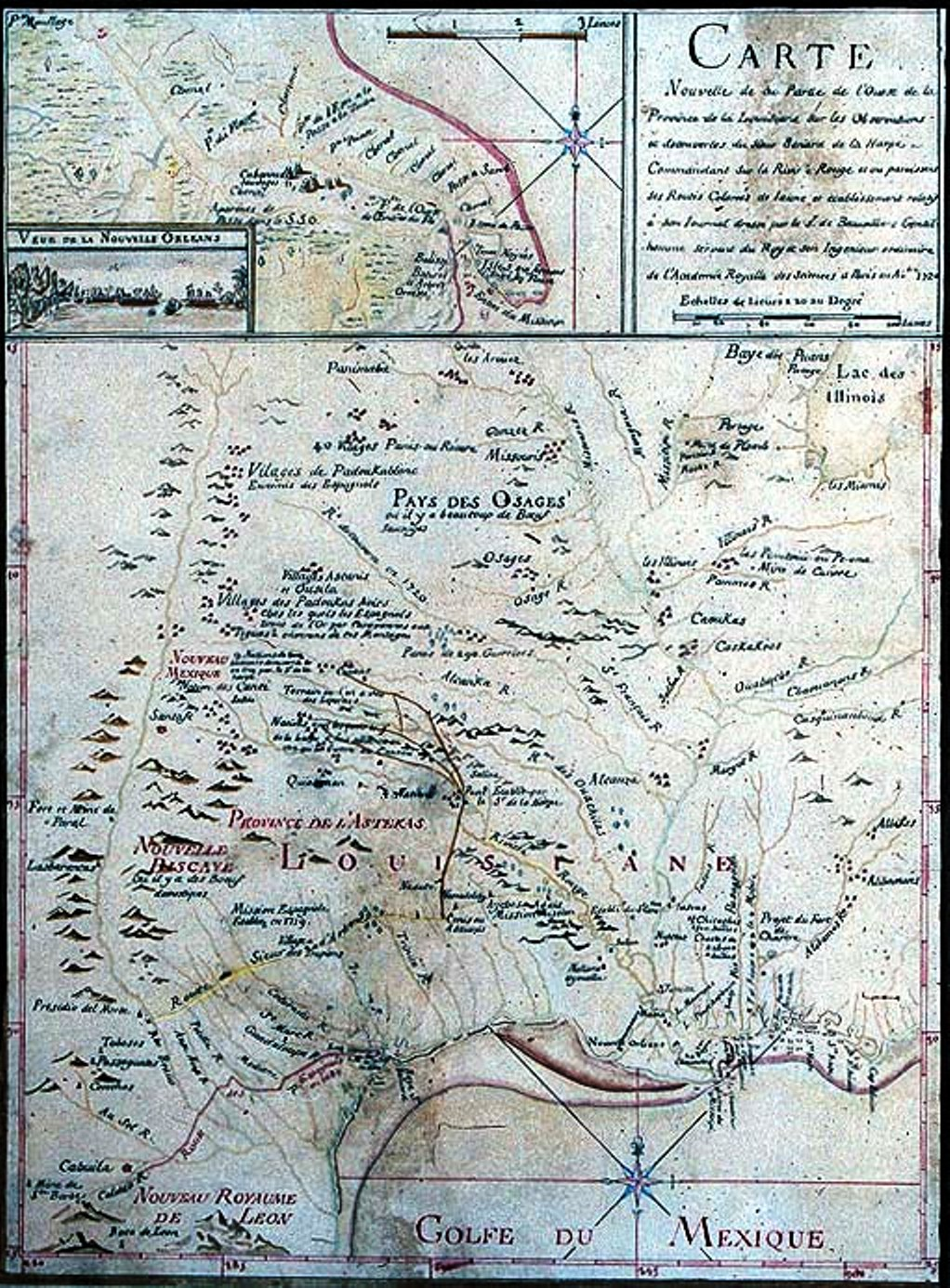
Map of La Harpe's exploration of the Mid-South

In 1721, La Harpe created the earliest known map of Galveston Island and Galveston Bay at a time when he was unsuccessfully trying to establish a French presence in the area. That map or a copy of it is now in the possession of the Rosenberg Library in Galveston. In la Harpe's map, Galveston Island is not given a name but is easily identifiable. According to the Handbook of Texas Online, la Harpe's ship, Subtile, had been destined for Matagorda, winding up in Galveston Bay only by mistake. This early citing of (or even potentially landing on) Galveston Island is rarely mentioned in history books, in sharp contrast with other early well-accepted (Cabeza de Vaca) or even potential (La Salle) contacts between Europeans and Galveston Island.

== Explorations in Arkansas ==
In 1722, La Harpe ascended the Arkansas River and found two distinct rock formations on the Arkansas River, the smaller one the South bank he named Le petit rocher and the larger on the North bank le rocher francais. He based a trading post near the smaller formation, as a Quapaw Indian settlement was stationed there. He explored the Arkansas River another 25 leagues (70 miles or 115 km) above Little Rock. He may have been the first explorer to discover Natural Steps, Arkansas. At the time, this area was occupied by a large Quapaw village.

Later in 1722, he presided over the transfer of Pensacola, Florida to the Spanish. In 1723 he returned to France and never came back to the Americas.

== Bibliography ==
- Bénard de La Harpe, Jean Baptiste (1851). Historical Journal of the Settlement of the French in Louisiana. New York: United States Library of Congress. LCCN 11006653. OCLC 715321605.
- Mott Wedel, Mildred (1978). "La Harpe's 1719 Post on Red River and Nearby Caddo Settlements". The Bulletin of the Texas Memorial Museum (30). Austin, Texas: The University of Texas at Austin.
