= James Alexander Veasey House =

Historic house in Oklahoma, United States

- U.S. National Register of Historic Places
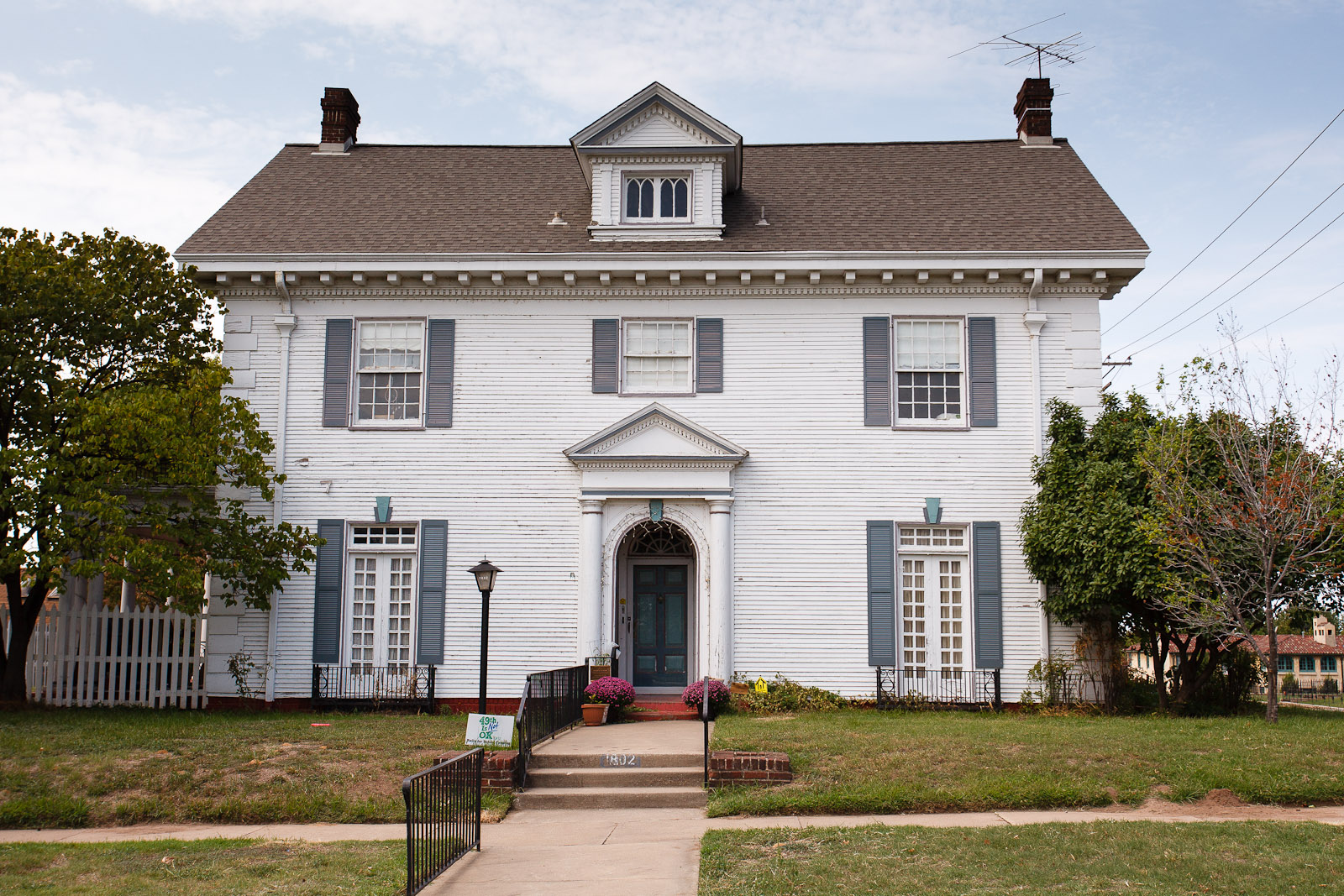

- Location within Oklahoma Location within the United States
- Location: 1802 S. Cheyenne Ave., Tulsa, Oklahoma
- Coordinates: 36°8′12″N 95°59′23″W
- Area: less than one acre
- Built: 1913
- Architect: Blair, John T.
- Architectural style: Colonial Revival
- NRHP reference No.: 89001006
- Added to NRHP: July 27, 1989

The James Alexander Veasey House, also known as the Veasey-Leach House, is a Colonial Revival style house in Tulsa, Oklahoma that was built in 1913. It was listed on the National Register of Historic Places in 1989 "for its architectural significance as a local landmark example of the Colonial Revival style".

It is included in the Buena Vista Park Historic District, later listed on the NRHP.

It was designed by local architect John T. Blair. The structure is a two-story Colonial Revival house. It is T-shaped, has clapboard siding and a gabled roof with a dormer centered above the entry.

The original owner, James Alexander Veasey, was a lawyer for the Dawes Commission who settled in Tulsa and founded the Holland Hall School. He lived in this house until 1938, when he retired as chief counsel for Carter Oil Company, a subsidiary of Standard Oil Company of New Jersey.
