= Ranch Acres Historic District =

Historic district in Oklahoma, United States

- U.S. National Register of Historic Places
- U.S. Historic district
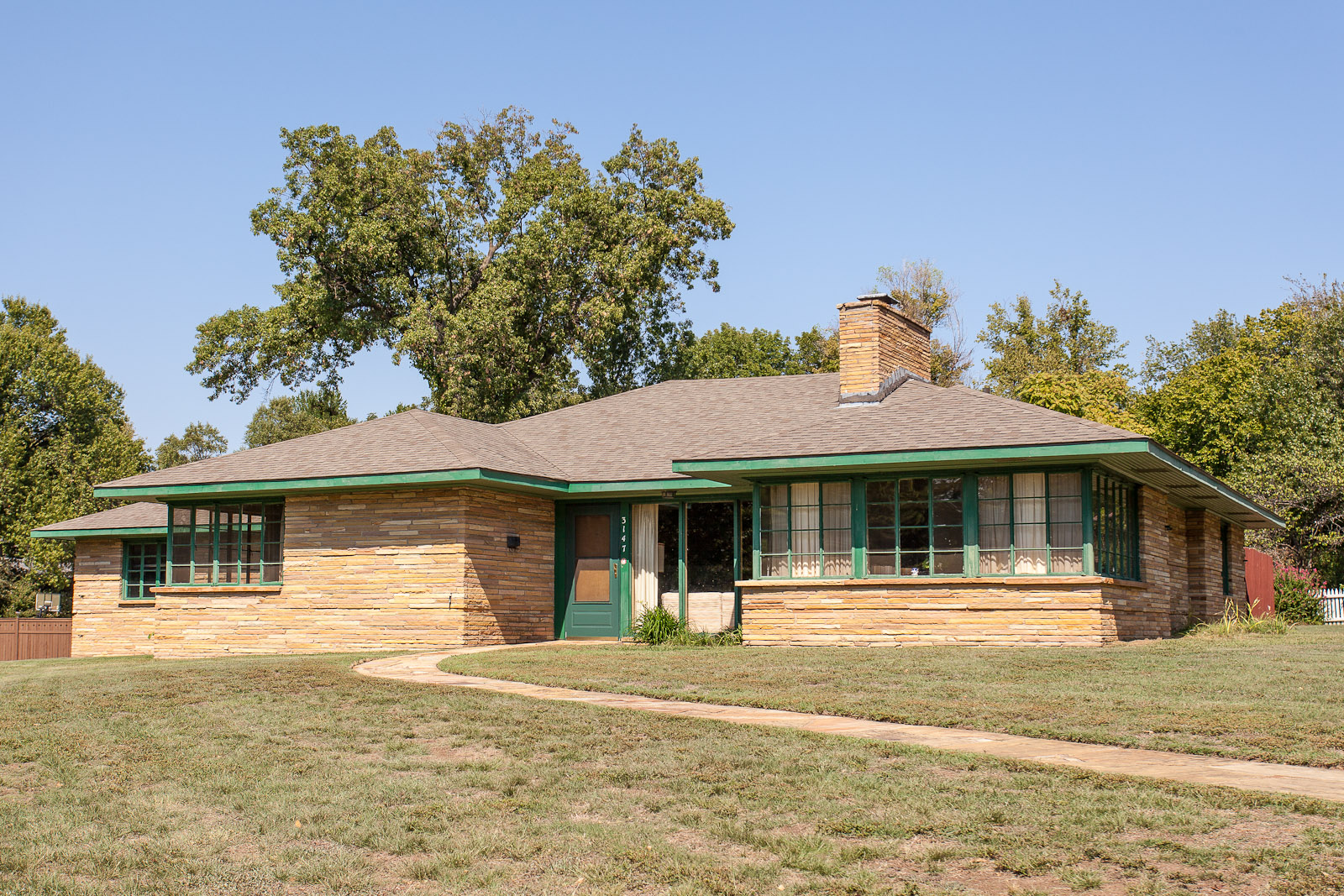
- Typical house in Ranch Acres Historic District. Courtesy W. R. Oswald, September 21, 2012
- Location: Tulsa, Oklahoma
- Built: 1949-1962
- Architect: multiple
- Architectural style: Ranch-style single family houses
- NRHP reference No.: 07001268

Significant dates
- Added to NRHP: December 12, 2007
- Designated HD: Residential housing

Ranch Acres is a residential neighborhood in Midtown Tulsa, Oklahoma. It was designated in 2007 as Ranch Acres National Historic District (Note: The district is frequently referred to as Ranch Acres Historic Residential District.) (RAHD) because it is an excellent example of a ranch house type of subdivision built after World War II. The area is bounded by 31st Street on the north, Harvard Avenue on the east, 41st Street on the south and both Delaware Avenue and Florence Avenue on the west.

RAHD's era of significance is 1949 to 1962, when the property was platted, the land developed and the vast majority of the houses were constructed. The district covers 182.1 acres and contains 324 residences. Of these, 291 are considered contributing properties (about 90 percent) to the District's historical appearance. There are also two commercial properties, five objects and three sites identified in the registration document.

Ranch Acres was listed on the National Register of Historic Places (NRHP) under Criterion C (Note: Criterion C is defined as "Property embodies the distinctive characteristics of a type, period, or method of construction or represents the work of a master, or possesses high artistic values, or represents a significant and distinguishable entity whose components lack individual distinction.) on December 12, 2007. Its registration number is 07001268.

== Background ==
At the beginning of World War II, housing in Tulsa was primarily either custom-designed (and very expensive) mansions for those who had become wealthy in the oil business, or relatively inexpensive houses with few amenities. Construction, other than that considered essential to the war effort, was largely curtailed. By the end of the war, the demand for housing by the young, relatively affluent professionals was far greater than the supply. Tulsa, like many other cities, initially turned to developing houses that were almost assembly-line design with few of the amenities that would later be taken almost for granted. A niche housing market formed for upscale houses, attractively designed, offering as much privacy as practical and with many modern conveniences.

== History ==
Immediately after World War II, Tulsa real estate investor, Ben Kirkpatrick, proposed that developer I. A. Jacobson buy a large tract at the corner of 31st and Harvard for development into a ranch-house subdivision. The location was outside the city limits and was considered "...way out in the country." Ranch style houses had come into fashion in Arizona and Southern California, and was a move away from so-called "G.I. housing" that was the foundation of such projects as Levittown. Part of the tract was owned by the Sand Springs Home, and had been used by Charles Page, philanthropist and founder of the Home, as a recreation area for hunting and horseback riding. Kirkpatrick bought the tract from the Home in 1949 and promptly transferred ownership to Jacobson.

Jacobson retained the Owen and Mansur engineering firm to layout and plat the development. He also hired Mack Hallum as builder and architect for the project. They would develop the area in four separate stages, each with its own plat, which were filed in 1949, 1951, 1953 and 1956.

Little Joe Creek ran from north to south through the property. Its presence had encouraged a large number of native pecan trees to grow there, creating a park-like ambience. (Note: Little Joe Creek is no longer visible in Ranch Acres. After several floods, Tulsa rerouted it through the subdivision and enclosed it in a concrete tunnel as part of its 1961 flood control and mitigation plan.)

Owen and Masur rejected the traditional grid plan for subdivision streets. Instead, they laid out curving streets and oversized lots in Ranch Acres to take maximum advantage of the rolling terrain and the existing trees. All of the houses built during the Era of Significance were one-story. A few houses built after 1962 had two stories.

The houses in Ranch Acres were considered pricey in their day. They ranged from $25,000 to $100,000 in 1954. (Note: The Tulsa Preservation Commission estimated that they would now sell for $210,000 to $850,000.) Jacobson marketed the houses in Ranch Acres to professionals and businessmen who had moved to Tulsa to work in the petroleum and defense industries, and who could afford to pay premium prices for these homes.

Nearly all the houses built during the era of significance are one-story, with low or moderately low pitched roofs or mansard roofs. Exterior walls are either brick, native stone, board and batten or horizontal siding. Originally, most of the houses had cedar shake roofs, but most of those have since been changed to asphalt tile. All of the houses had garages, and a majority were built with two or three-car garages.

== See also ==
Ranch-style house
