= Buena Vista Park Historic District =

Historic district in Oklahoma, United States

- U.S. National Register of Historic Places
- U.S. Historic district
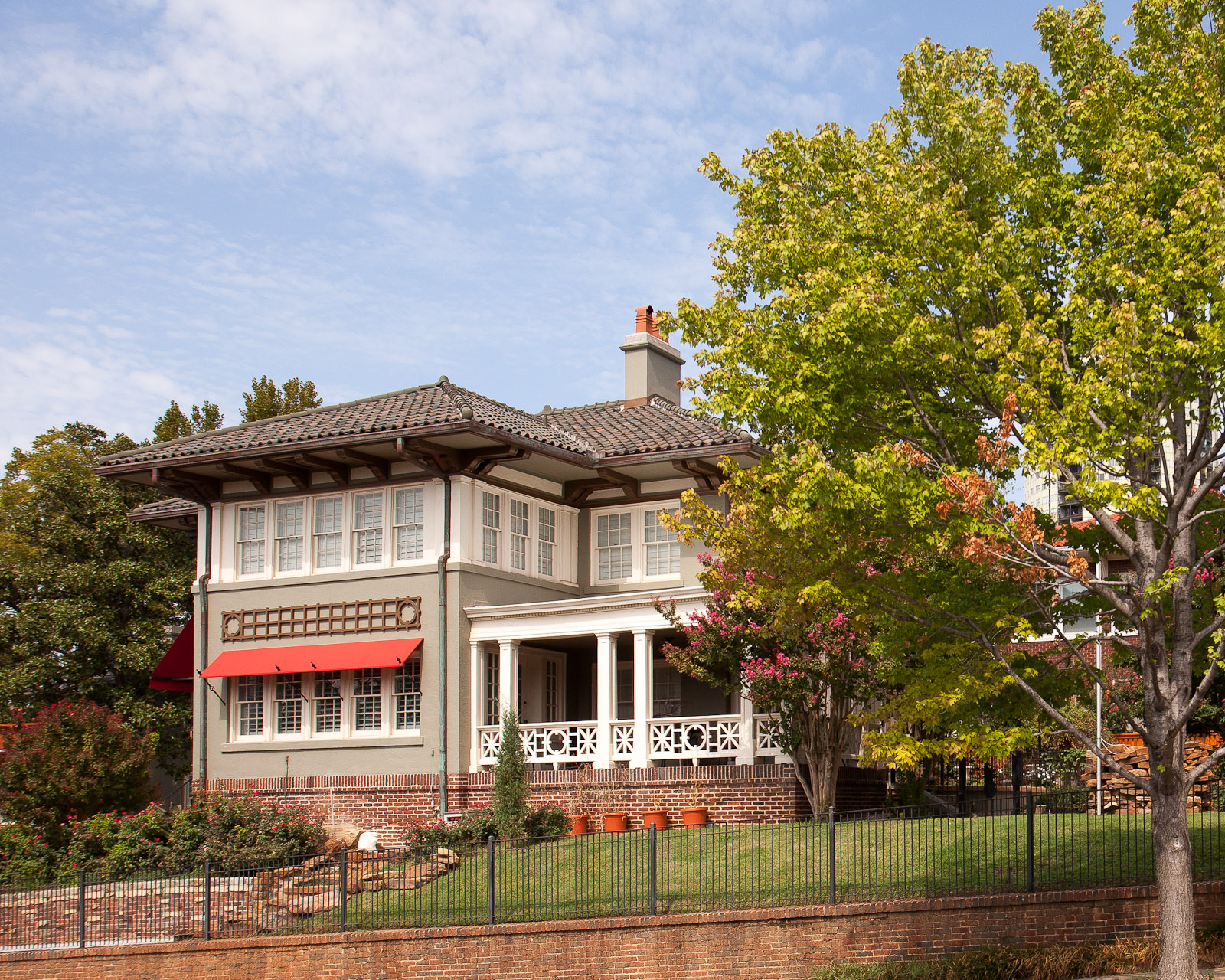

- Location within Oklahoma Location within the United States
- Location: Roughly bounded by W. 18th St. S, rear lot lines of E of S. Cheyenne Ave. W, W. 21st St. S and Riverside Dr./S, Carson, Tulsa, Oklahoma
- Coordinates: 36°8′5″N 95°59′24″W
- Area: 5 acres (2.0 ha)
- Architect: Barnett, Haynes, Barnett; Blair, John
- Architectural style: Colonial Revival architecture, Prairie School, Bungalow/Craftsman architecture
- NRHP reference No.: 07000919
- Added to NRHP: September 6, 2007

The Buena Vista Park Historic District in Tulsa, Oklahoma is a 5-acre (2.0 ha) historic district that was listed on the U.S. National Register of Historic Places (NRHP) in 2007. Its 24 contributing buildings include Late 19th and 20th Century Revivals and Late 19th and Early 20th Century American Movements architecture, specifically Colonial Revival architecture, Prairie School, and Bungalow/Craftsman architecture. The period of significance is 1913-1933.

It comprises three blocks of the Buena Vista Park Addition, an area platted out in 1908. District boundaries are East 18th Street on the north, the rear lot lines of properties on the east side of South Cheyenne Avenue on the east, East 21st Street on the south and Riverside Drive/Carson Drive on the west.

It includes the James Alexander Veasey House at 1802 South Cheyenne Avenue West, which was already NRHP-listed "for its architectural significance as a local landmark example of the Colonial Revival style."

It was listed on the NRHP for its architecture.

It is near the Arkansas River.

== See also ==
- Brady Heights Historic District, also NRHP-listed in Tulsa
