= White City, Tulsa =

- White City Historic District
- U.S. National Register of Historic Places
- U.S. Historic district
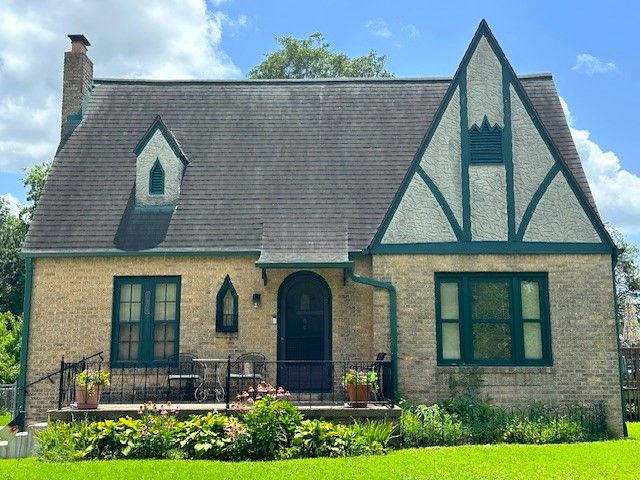
- Typical district Tudor Revival house, July 2025

- Location within Oklahoma Location within the United States
- Location: Tulsa, Oklahoma
- Coordinates: 36°9′4″N 95°55′3″W
- Built: 1926 - 1930; 1946 - 1951
- Architectural style: Tudor Revival (1920s); Minimal Traditional (1940s)
- NRHP reference No.: 01000663
- Added to NRHP: June 14, 2001

White City is a residential neighborhood in Midtown, Tulsa, Oklahoma. It is bounded on the north by 2nd Street, on the east by Fulton Avenue, on the south by 11th Street and on the west by Yale Avenue. The neighborhood was added to the National Register of Historic Places in 2001. The area includes 480 buildings, of which 325 retain their historic significance. Two parks are also included in the listing.

== History ==
The property now covered by White City had been a part of the Creek Nation since the tribe had been relocated to Indian Territory. After the tribal property allocation, ownership of this piece of land passed to one individual member, Edward Crowell. Glenn T. Braden, founder of Oklahoma Natural Gas Company (now ONE Gas), bought a large part of the tract from Crowell in 1912. Braden built the White City Jersey Dairy Farm on the tract and imported a herd of Jersey cattle. The farm's name refers to the color of barns and silos that Braden built there.

After Braden died in 1923, his children closed the dairy, platted the land and began selling lots for the construction of houses. Development of White City subdivision began in 1926. The development included a park named White City Park, but the name was changed later to Braden Park. During the first stage of development (1926 -1930), the lots were about 1 acre (0.40 ha). The majority of the houses were built in the Tudor Revival style. Construction declined during the Great Depression and World War II. In 1946, homebuilding resumed and that became the year of greatest home sales in White City. Houses constructed during this second phase were predominantly Minimal Traditional style. (Note: The Tulsa Preservation Commission stated that Minimal Traditional is “…a simplified form loosely based on the previously dominant Tudor Revival style of the 1920s and 1930s.”) Construction continued until the early 1950s, when the available lots were fully occupied.

== General description ==
According to a 1999 survey prepared by Audley, the neighborhood contained 570 buildings. Of these, 442 (77.5%) were assessed as contributing structures. The other 128 buildings were assessed as non-contributing either because they had been significantly altered in appearance or because they did not meet the age requirement. (Note: A building must be at least 50 years old to be considered as contributing to the designation of a historic district. No buildings were considered eligible for individual listing on the National Register of Historic Places.)

The survey found that one house had been built as early as 1915. (Note: The house was almost certainly associated with the dairy farm.) The first two additions were White City and Glen Haven, both platted in 1926. Sanford Addition was platted in 1942. Glen Haven was amended in 1946. White City (@) and Bowlin Acres were platted in 1947 and Norton Addition platted in 1954. Audley documented that 11 buildings had been built by 1926, and 92 were constructed after 1949.

Oil and gas wells existed on the White City property, but these were shut down in the early 1930s. Underground coal mines were also in existence as early as 1917, producing as much as 20 carloads a day. These mines closed in the late 1930s.

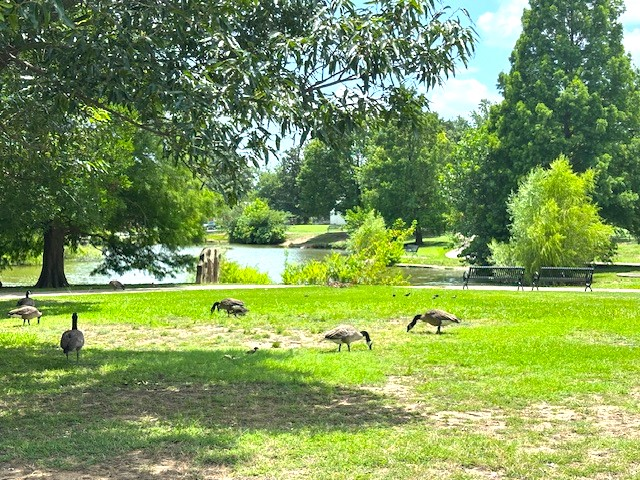
Braden Park in July 2025

== Braden Park ==
The White City dairy had a stock pond that supplied water for the livestock. In 1926, this became the focus of White City Park. The size of the pond was reduced to about half its former size, a fountain was added and the 10 acres (4.0 ha) area of the park was landscaped. The park was renamed Braden Park and continues to operate as a Tulsa city park. The park has tennis courts, picnic tables and two playgrounds.

== Additional information ==
- Audley, Elizabeth. Historic/Architectural Survey of White City Neighborhood, Tulsa, Oklahoma. September 1, 1999. http://www.okhistory.org/shpo/architsurveys/ILSofWhiteCityTulsa.pdf
- Longacre, Craig Allen. White City:Direction for the Future. University of Oklahoma College of Architecture Urban Design Studio. (OUUDS) 2008. http://tulsagrad.ou.edu/studio/whitecity/whitecity.pdf.
