= Yorktown, Tulsa =

- Yorktown Historic District
- U.S. National Register of Historic Places
- U.S. Historic district
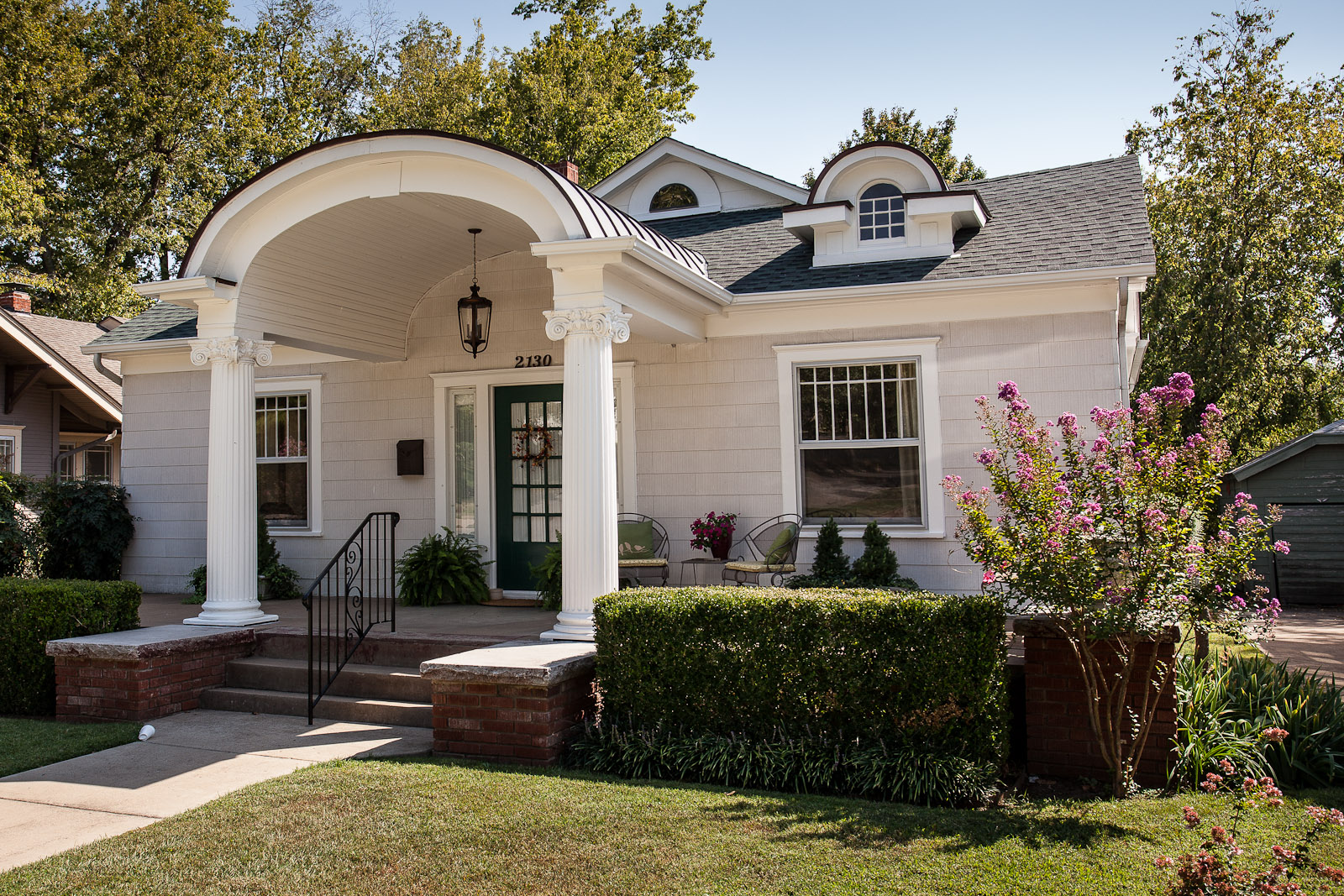
- Craftsman Bungalow in Yorktown, Tulsa, Oklahoma. Courtesy of W. R. Oswald, 2012
- Location: Tulsa, OK
- Coordinates: 36.13695°N 95.96206°W
- Built: 1921
- Architect: Reddin, J.C.; Adams & Reddin
- Architectural style: Bungalow/craftsman, Tudor Revival
- NRHP reference No.: 02000657
- Added to NRHP: June 20, 2002

Yorktown is a historic district in Tulsa, Oklahoma. It is bordered by 16th and 17th Streets on the north, 20th Street on the south, Lewis Avenue on the east, and Victor/Wheeling Avenues on the west.

The Yorktown Neighborhood includes 19 blocks of single family residences. Composed of eight separate additions, the district does not exhibit a single pattern of residential development. Significant construction of residences in the Yorktown district began in 1921 with the Bungalow/Craftsman style making up 69 percent of all houses in the district. Tudor Revival is the second most prevalent style, gaining popularity in the district in the late 1920s. Combined, the Bungalow/Craftsman and Tudor Revival styles constitute ninety percent of the Yorktown residences.

The area defined as the Yorktown District contained 449 properties. The 2000 survey showed that 90.6% of the properties could be classed as contributing to the district. Most of the other properties were classed as noncontributing because of significant alterations to their original appearance, or because they were insufficiently old (i.e., did not meet the 50 year age requirement for NRHP listing).

Yorktown was listed in the National Register of Historic Places on June 20, 2002 under National Register criteria A and C. Its NRIS number is 02000657.
