= Sinclair Service Station (Tulsa, Oklahoma) =

- U.S. National Register of Historic Places
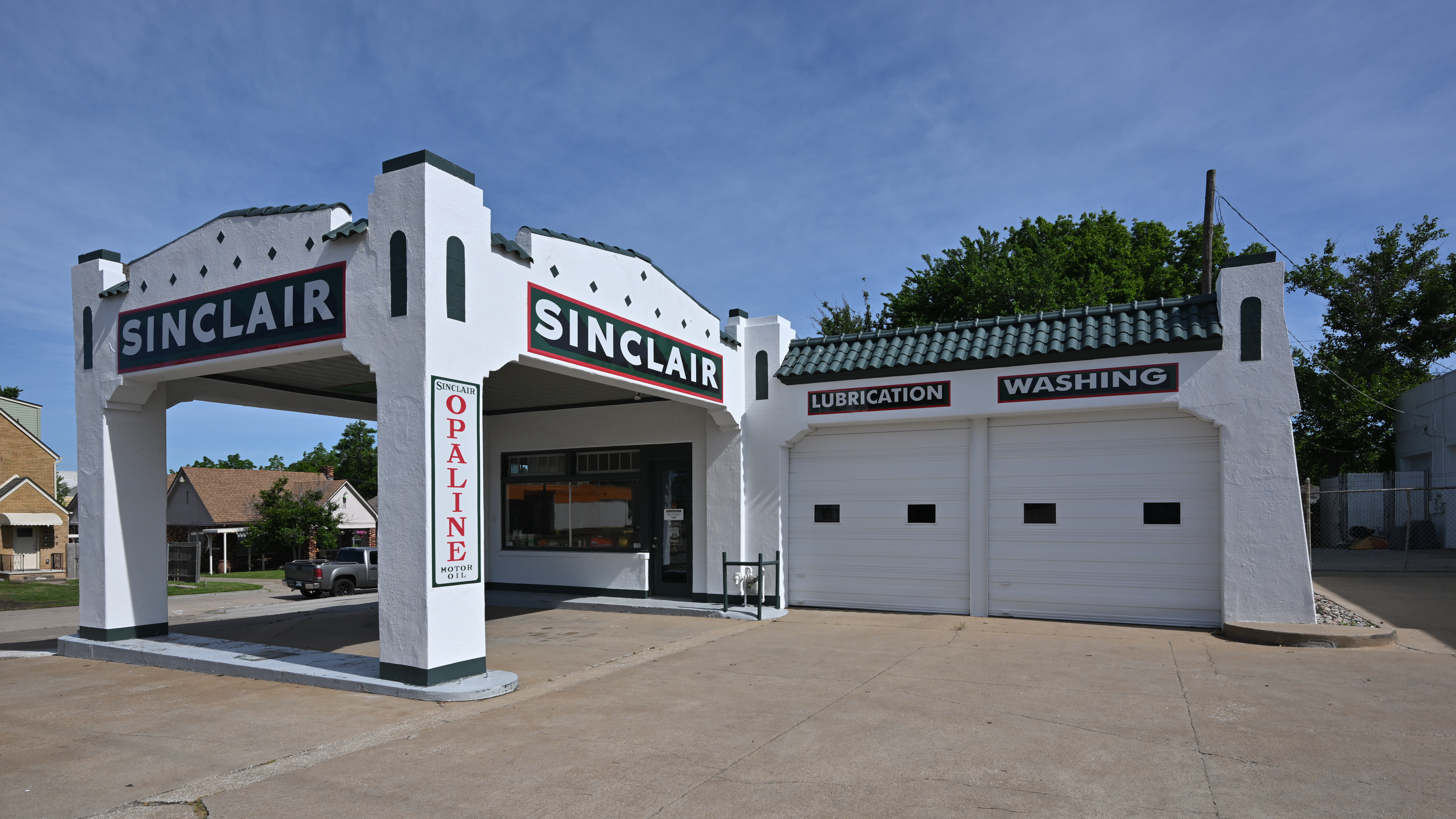

- Location within Oklahoma
- Location: 3501 E. 11th St., Tulsa, Oklahoma
- Coordinates: 36°08′53″N 95°56′15″W
- Area: less than one acre
- Architectural style: Mission/spanish Revival
- MPS: Route 66 in Oklahoma MPS
- NRHP reference No.: 96001486
- Added to NRHP: December 13, 1996

The Sinclair Service Station in Tulsa, Oklahoma, at 3501 E. 11th St., was built in 1929. It was listed on the National Register of Historic Places in 1996.

The station is located on the original U.S. Route 66 (11th St.). Its NRHP nomination asserts that the station "is an excellent example of a Spanish Eclectic service station. The station consists of three parts; the office, the covered gas pump area, and an attached double-bay service garage. A stucco exterior, a triangular parapet, and the Ludowici-tiled visor roof are all characteristics commonly associated with the architectural style."

Its listing was consistent with a study of historic resources on Route 66 in Oklahoma.
