= 66 Motel (Tulsa) =

- U.S. National Register of Historic Places
- Location within Oklahoma
- Location: 3660 Southwest Blvd., Tulsa, Oklahoma
- Coordinates: 36°06′37″N 96°00′46″W
- Area: 1 acre (0.40 ha)
- Architectural style: Vernacular Moderne
- MPS: Route 66 in Oklahoma MPS
- NRHP reference No.: 96001487
- Added to NRHP: December 13, 1996

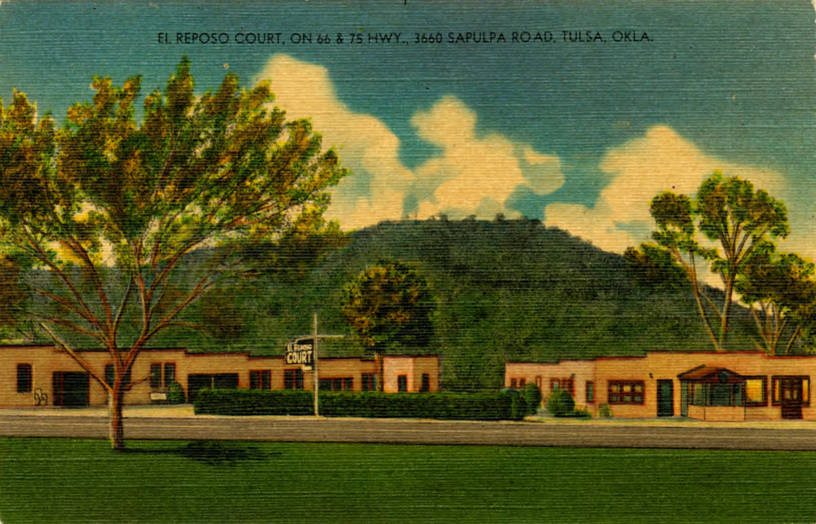
El Reposo Court, Mrs. Nora Wilson owner

The 66 Motel in Tulsa, Oklahoma was built on the original, two-lane U.S. Route 66 (US 66, Route 66) around 1933 and was listed on the National Register of Historic Places in 1996. The listing included two buildings: the main or office building and a separate strip of motel rooms. The buildings are described as having "a vernacular interpretation of the Moderne style of architecture, sharing similar characteristics such as horizontal emphasis, flat roofs, asymmetrical design, and glass block windows."

According to a film with 1993 footage by Anthony Reichardt, a hobbyist who took road trips in 1992-98 and documented deteriorating places along Route 66, the motel was originally El Reposo Court at 3660 Sapulpa Road.

== History ==
It was built by Isaac Burnaman. It consisted of 17 concrete block and stucco cottages, each with attached garages, providing privacy as guests could enter through the garage. A postcard advertising El Reposo Court, with mention it was owned and operated by Mrs. Nora Wilson, indicates it was on 66–75 Highway, i.e. that Route 66 and US 75 were the same there.

By 1992 the street became Southwest Boulevard and had been widened to four lanes, which cut away space in front of the motel, leaving just 15 feet (4.6 m) from roadway to the office building, and Interstate 244 had been built and ran behind the property. At some point US 75 was re-routed in overpasses to merge into 244.

The motel was deemed significant for National Register listing "for its association with Route 66, the most popular touring highway in the West" and as representative of "one of the most important property types associated with Route 66: the motor court. It is also architecturally significant as an excellent representative example of the Moderne style of architecture. This style was popular for roadside buildings from 1920 to 1940."

The main building, which originally had gas pumps in front and contained the motel office and a diner, is stuccoed and has a stepped parapet. Glass blocks are used in rounded corners at its entranceway. This building also included motel rooms at its rear. The motel is interesting in that it included a one-car garage unit for each motel room, with entry to the units through the garage bays. This can be considered a feature, not a deficiency, as this could provide privacy. Only the end units had door openings to the front.

In 1992 the gas pumps and diner were gone and the main building was used as a single residence, but the "66 Motel maintains a high degree of architectural integrity."

According to the hobbyist, business had declined with the widening of the highway, although the motel had continued to operate through the 1980s with weekly and monthly rentals.

According to the hobbyist, it was demolished by a wrecking ball on June 26, 2001.

In 2023, the address there is instead a document storage building of Data Management, Inc.
