= Neighborhoods of Tulsa, Oklahoma =

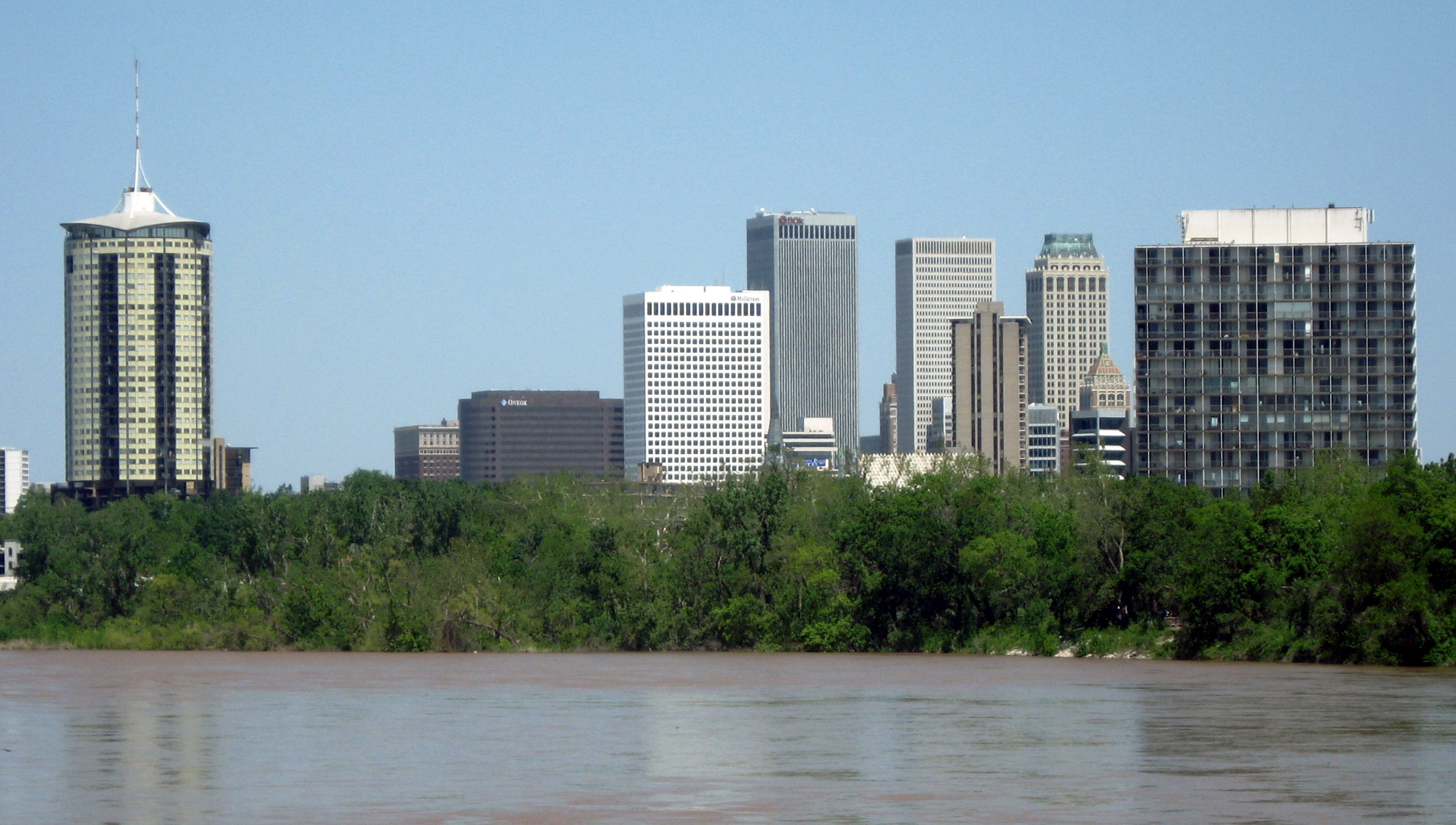
The Arkansas River marks the division between West Tulsa and other regions of the city.

Tulsa is the second-largest city in the state of Oklahoma. It has many diverse neighborhoods due to its size.

Downtown Tulsa is an area of approximately 1.4 square miles (3.6 km^{2}) surrounded by an inner-dispersal loop created by Interstate 244, Highway 64, and Highway 75. The area serves as Tulsa's financial and business district, and is the focus of a large initiative to draw tourism, which includes plans to capitalize on the area's historic architecture. Much of Tulsa's convention space is located in downtown, such as the Tulsa Performing Arts Center, the Tulsa Convention Center, and the BOK Center. Prominent downtown sub-districts include the "Oil Capital" District, the Blue Dome District, the Arts District, Owen Park Historical Neighborhood, and the Greenwood Historical District, the site of ONEOK Field, a baseball stadium for the Tulsa Drillers opened in 2010.

The city's historical residential core lies in Midtown, just south of Downtown, containing upscale neighborhoods built in the early 20th century with architecture ranging from Art Deco to Greek Revival. The University of Tulsa, the Swan Lake neighborhood, Philbrook Museum, and the upscale shopping districts of Utica Square, Cherry Street, and Brookside are located in this region. A large portion of the city's southern half has developed since the 1970s, containing low-density housing and retail developments. This region, marked by secluded homes and suburban neighborhoods, contains Woodland Hills Mall, as well as Southern Hills Country Club, and Oral Roberts University.

East of Highway 169 and north of 61st street, a diverse racial makeup marks the eastern portions of the city, with large Asian and Mexican communities and much of the city's manufacturing industry.

Areas of Tulsa west of the Arkansas River are called West Tulsa, and are marked by large parks, wilderness reserves, and large oil refineries. The northern tier of the city is home to OSU-Tulsa, Gilcrease Museum, Tulsa International Airport, the Tulsa Zoo, the Tulsa Air and Space Museum, and the nation's third-largest municipal park, Mohawk Park.

== Downtown ==
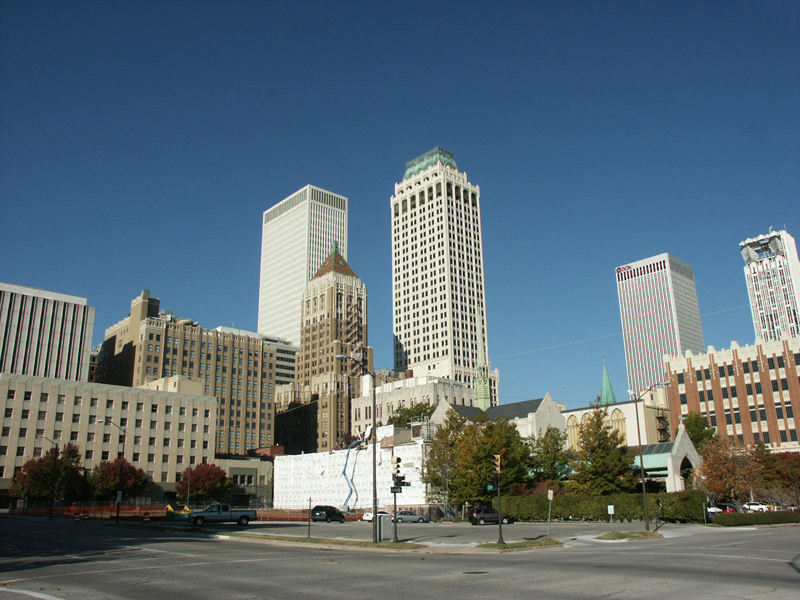
Downtown Tulsa

Tulsa includes many structures built during the Oil Boom in the 1920s and 1930s, including Art Deco buildings such as Boston Avenue Methodist Church and Tulsa Union Depot. Waite Phillips left a significant architectural impact on downtown Tulsa through the Philtower and Philcade Building. Other notable downtown Tulsa buildings include the Exchange Bank Building (today known as the 320 South Boston Building), the Cosden Building (later expanded into today's Mid-Continent Tower), Atlas Life Building, Holy Family Cathedral, Holy Trinity Greek Orthodox Church, and the Mayo Hotel. Known for a time as "Terra Cotta City", Tulsa hosted the International Sixth Congress on Art Deco in 2001. The core downtown area was designated on the National Register of Historic Places as the Oil Capital Historic District in 2010.

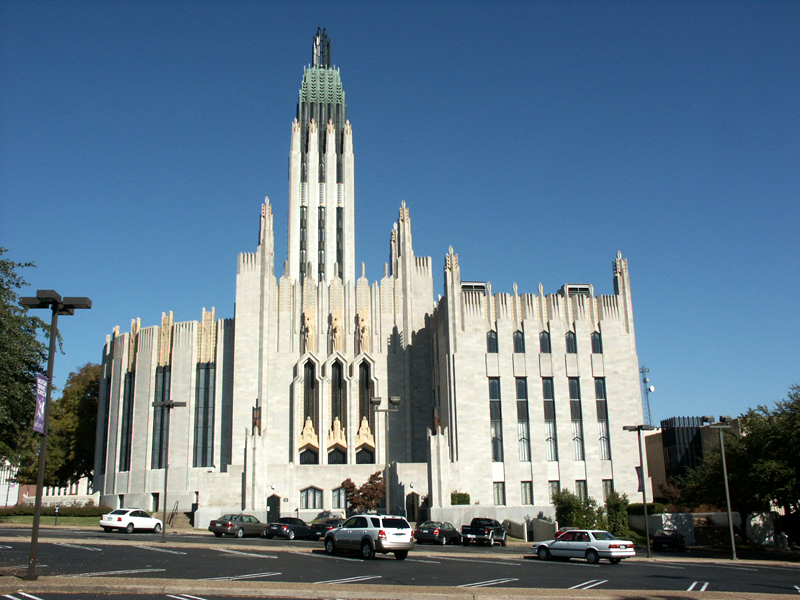
Boston Avenue Methodist Church

Downtown Tulsa is in the northwest quadrant of the city and is ringed by an expressway called the Inner Dispersal Loop. Downtown's buildings include many large office towers. At 667 ft (203 m), the BOK Tower (formerly One Williams Center) was the tallest building in any of the 5 "plains states" (Oklahoma, Kansas, Nebraska, North Dakota and South Dakota) until the Devon Tower in Oklahoma City was completed in 2012. The BOK Tower was designed in 1975 by Minoru Yamasaki & Associates, the same architect who designed the World Trade Center in New York City.

The Tulsa Performing Arts Center (PAC) occupies a half city block in Tulsa's historical downtown. The PAC is also the design of Minoru Yamasaki. It houses five theatres and a reception hall. More than a quarter of a million people visit the Center each year to attend a performance from one of Tulsa's seven acclaimed musical and dramatic companies including the Tulsa Ballet, Tulsa Symphony Orchestra, Tulsa Opera, Theatre Tulsa, and a variety of symphonic groups. The PAC hosts a multitude of cultural events through the fall, winter, and spring.

In 2005, the City of Tulsa broke ground on a 19,199-seat regional events center designed by architect César Pelli. The arena was named the BOK Center (or Bank of Oklahoma Center) and opened on August 30, 2008.

=== Oil Capital Historic District ===
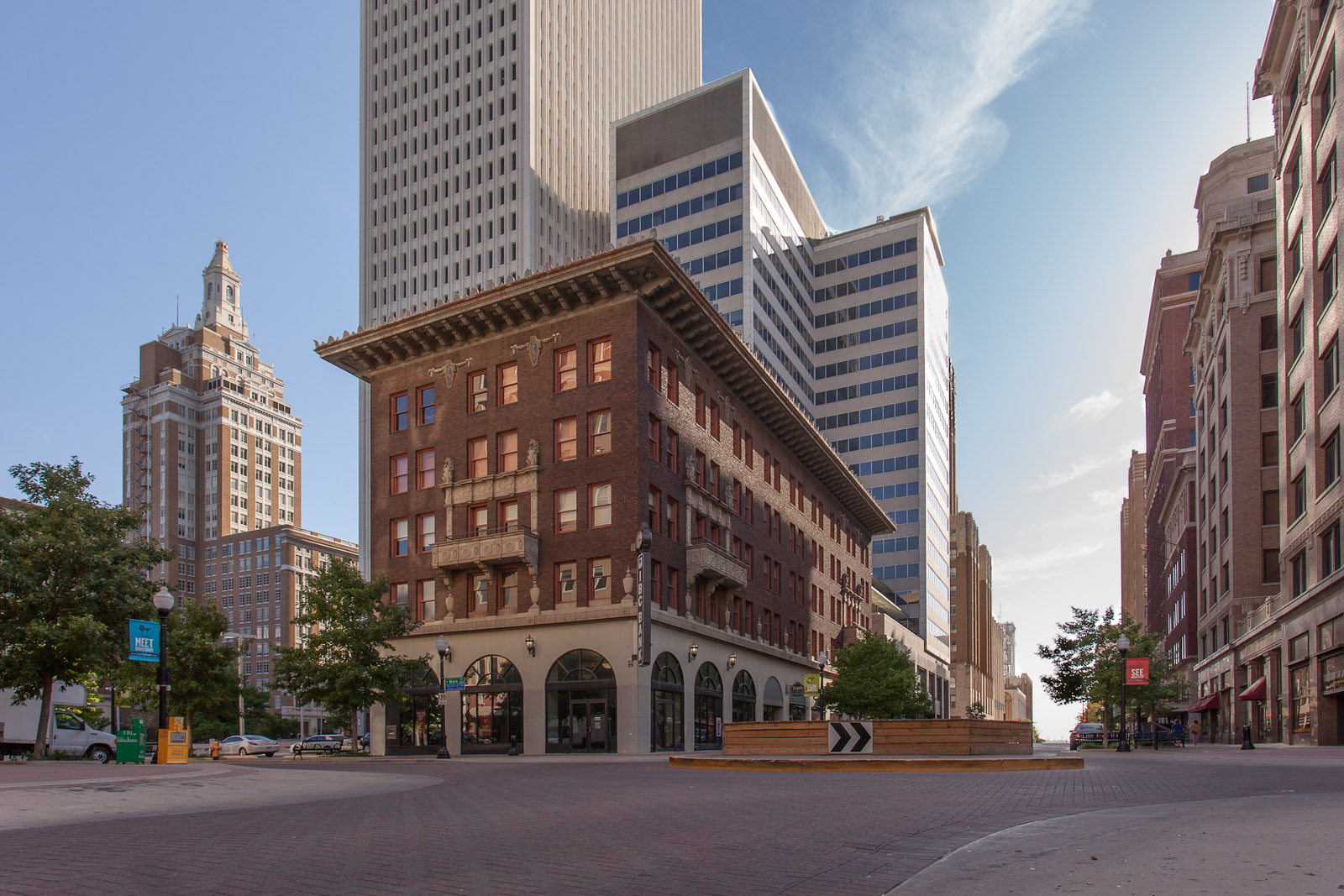
Oil Capital Historic District looking east at Fifth and Main

The Oil Capital Historic District was added to the National Register of Historic Places in 2010. Third Street bounds it on the north, Seventh Street on the South, Cincinnati Avenue on the east, and Cheyenne Avenue on the west. This area features many historic Downtown office buildings constructed during the 1920s and 1930s during the height of the city's oil boom when it was considered the 'Oil Capital of the World'..

=== Blue Dome District ===
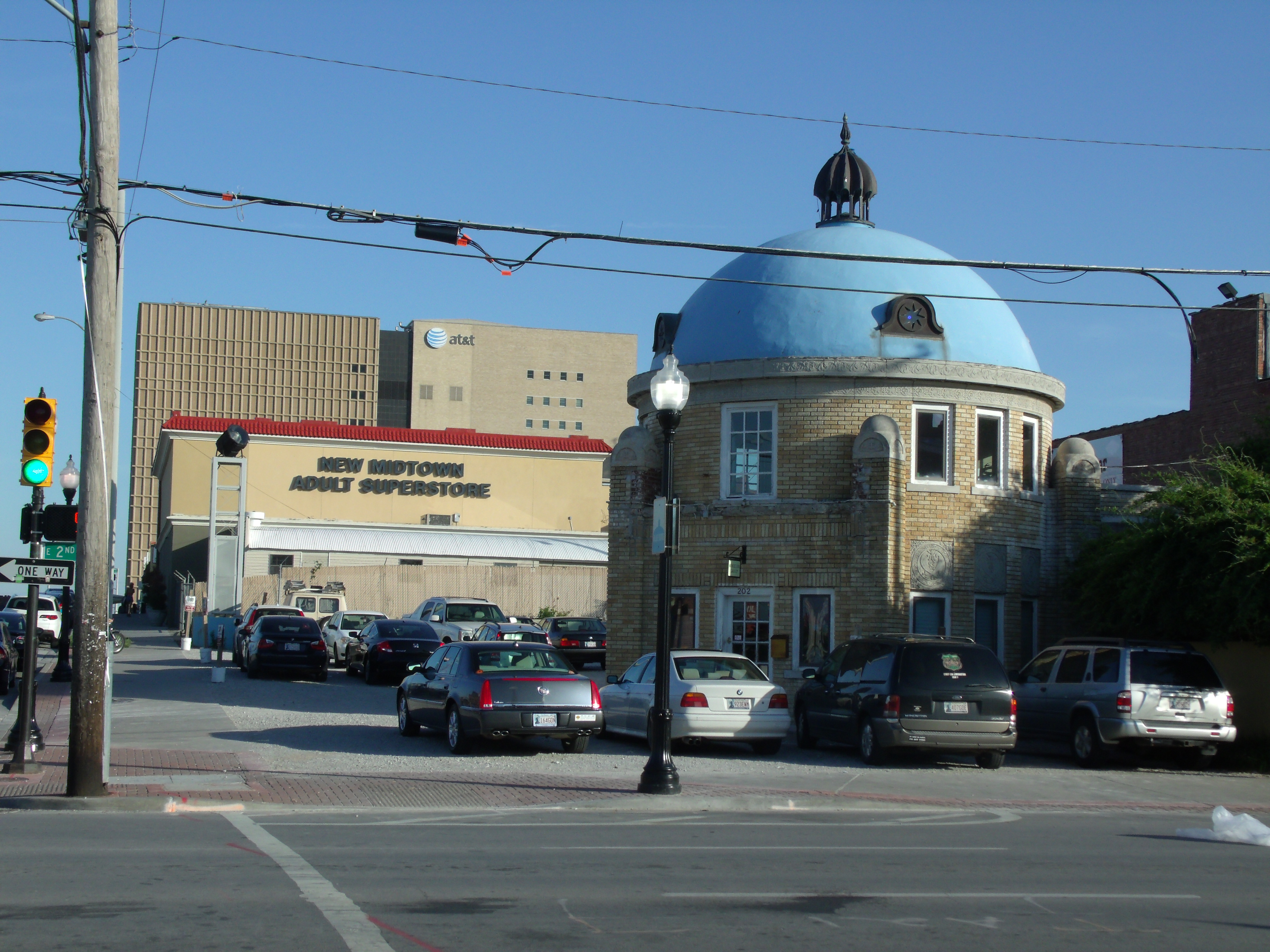
The Blue Dome, a former Gulf Oil Service Station, built in 1924.

Another popular downtown entertainment district is the Blue Dome, named for a distinctive, domed building located at Second Street and Elgin Avenue in the eastern section of downtown. The building was originally constructed in 1924 as a 24-hour Gulf Oil service station. It has been converted into an information desk/office for the district. The area is notable for its vibrant nightlife, offering a diverse mix of restaurants, shops, bars, breweries, murals, and a bowling alley. It is also known for its proximity to Tulsa City Hall.

=== East Village ===
The Lynn Riggs Theatre at the Dennis R. Neill Equality Center in the East Village

The East Village comprises 115 acres, bordered by East 2nd and East 7th Streets, Detroit Avenue, and Lansing Avenue, located just inside the inner-dispersal loop. This area boasts an upscale martini bar, American Theatre Company Studios, a hair salon, a pet day care, photography studios, lofts, a knitting room, and a living arts district, among others. The cornerstone of this neighborhood is the largest LGBT community center in Oklahoma, and fifth largest LGBT Center in the United States, the Dennis R. Neill Equality Center, owned and operated by Oklahomans for Equality/OkEq (formerly Tulsa Oklahomans for Human Rights/TOHR), with further development being planned for more restaurants, residential lofts and retail. OkEq hosts Tulsa Pride each June in the East Village neighborhood.

=== The Pearl District ===
The Pearl District is emerging as a cultural hub just east of downtown. Once suffering from significant blight, the Pearl District has seen fervent restoration and new business development thanks to a concerted infill effort on the part of the City of Tulsa, including new bars and restaurants, white collar small offices, and new residential buildings, with zoning designed to encourage mixed use and walkability. It is bordered by 1st street to the north and 11th street to the south, and lies adjacent to Centennial Park to the west.

It was the neighborhood of journalist and activist Lee Roy Chapman and houses his Center for Public Secrets. The historic Art Deco-style Tulsa Fire Alarm Building is at 1010 South Detroit in the district, but has been unused for several years. The building was sold in July 2015 to be converted into a museum honoring Tulsa's firefighters. As of 2025, it hasn’t opened to the public. The Pearl District also contains The Church Studio, a former church that Leon Russell turned into a recording studio and the focal point of the Tulsa Sound music movement during the 1970s.

=== Uptown ===
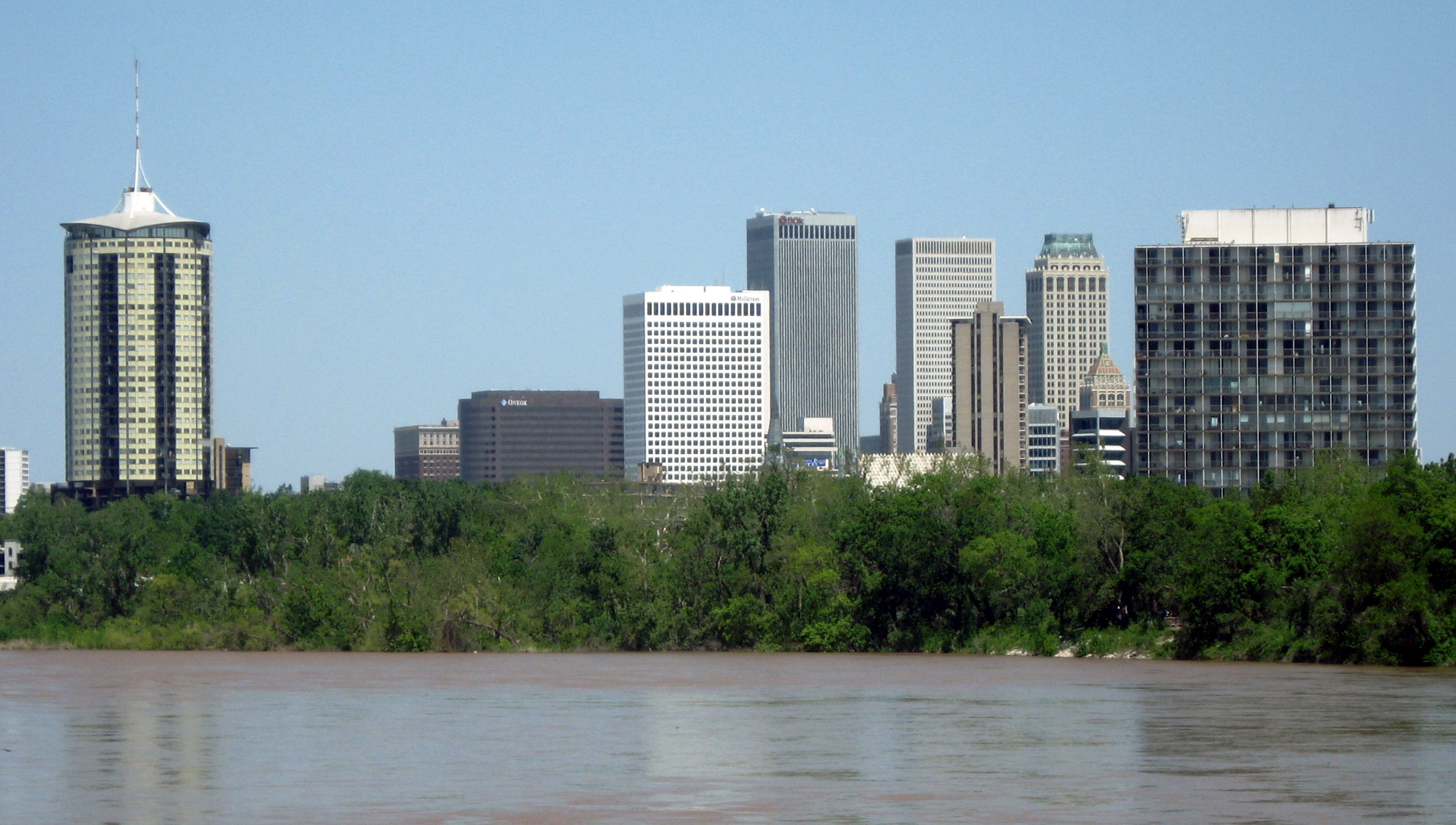
Riverview, along the Arkansas River in Tulsa

Uptown is the region just to the south of Downtown. The bar district in this area, at 18th and South Boston, (sometimes referred to as 'SoBo') is quite popular. The Ambassador Hotel, now listed on the National Register of Historic Places listings in Tulsa County, Oklahoma, was built in 1929 to provide temporary housing for businessmen and now functions as a boutique hotel. The building is at the corner of Main and 14th Street. The Tulsa Preservation Commission identified this location as "...the Southeast Business Area of the Riverview section of Tulsa."

=== Buena Vista Park Historic District ===
The Buena Vista Park residential addition, comprising three blocks, was initiated in 1908. It was the start of what is now the Buena Vista Park Historic District, which was listed on the U.S. National Register of Historic Places (NRHP) in 2007. The district now covers 5 acres (2.0 ha). Its period of architectural significance was 1913 - 1933. One of the supporting properties, the James Alexander Veasey House at 1802 South Cheyenne Avenue West, was added to the NRHP in its own right on July 27, 1989.

=== Riverview Historic District ===
Riverview is bounded on the north by 12th and 13th Streets, on the east by the alley between Denver and Elwood Avenues, on the south by Riverside Drive and 14th Place, and on the west by Jackson Avenue. The name originated from Riverview Elementary School, located at 12th and Guthrie. Although the school building was demolished in 1975, the district retained its name. This area contains houses and apartment buildings constructed between 1911 and 1938 and is known for the historic Dresser Mansion and the University Club Tower.

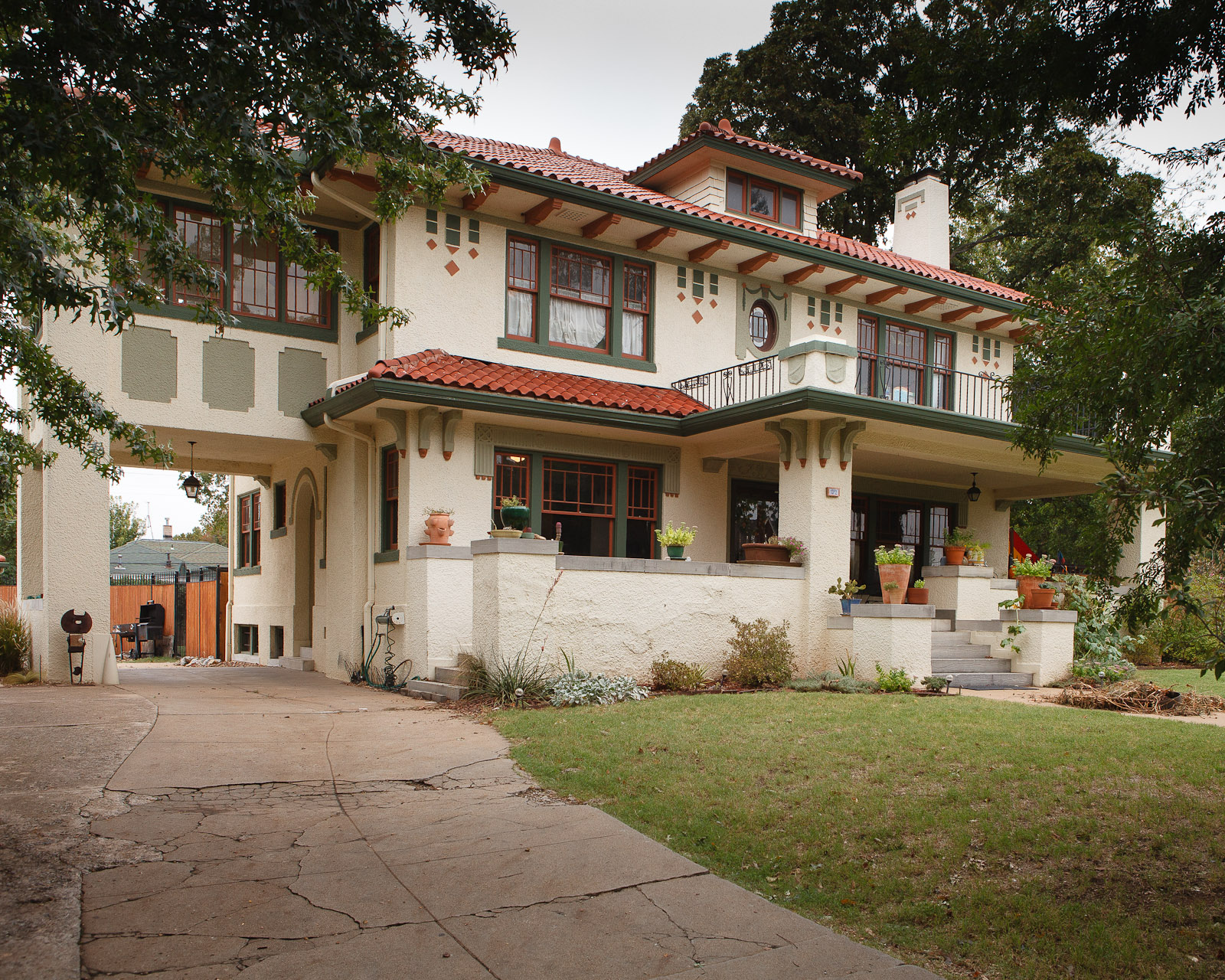

Included are several structures that are individually listed on the National Register of Historic Places.

- McBirney Mansion (NRIS 76001577)
- Patrick M. Kerr House
- Clinton-Hardy House (NRIS 79002027)
- Nellie Shields Jackson House
- Bird House
- Riverside Studio (NRIS 01000656)

== Midtown ==
Midtown is a largely residential district in the heart of the city. This area consists mostly of homes built from the early 1900s to the 1950s and has a wide variety of American styles ranging from the Craftsman bungalow to the ranch-style home to Greek Revival. The neighborhood is even home to a relocated saltbox home from colonial New England. Schools in this part of the city include Bishop Kelley, Edison Preparatory School, Eliot Elementary, Francis Scott Key Elementary, Monte Cassino, Council Oak Elementary, Patrick Henry Elementary, Wright Elementary, Undercroft Montessori, and Hoover Elementary. Woodward Park, located in Midtown, is known for its azaleas and gardens and is a popular destination for photography and picnics. Other popular Midtown Parks include Swan Lake, Zink Park, Darlington Park, and Whiteside Park.

Utica Square, Tulsa's first suburban shopping center, is an upscale outdoor center with a mix of locally owned retailers, including Miss Jackson's, Tulsa's oldest department store, and national chains. Adjacent to Utica Square is Temple Israel, a Reform Jewish congregation housed in a building by prolific synagogue architect Percival Goodman, and Cascia Hall Preparatory School, a college preparatory school now also known as a key location in the fantasy/horror House of Night novel series written by P.C. Cast and Kristin Cast. Tulsa's conservative synagogue, B'nai Emunah, is also located in Midtown.

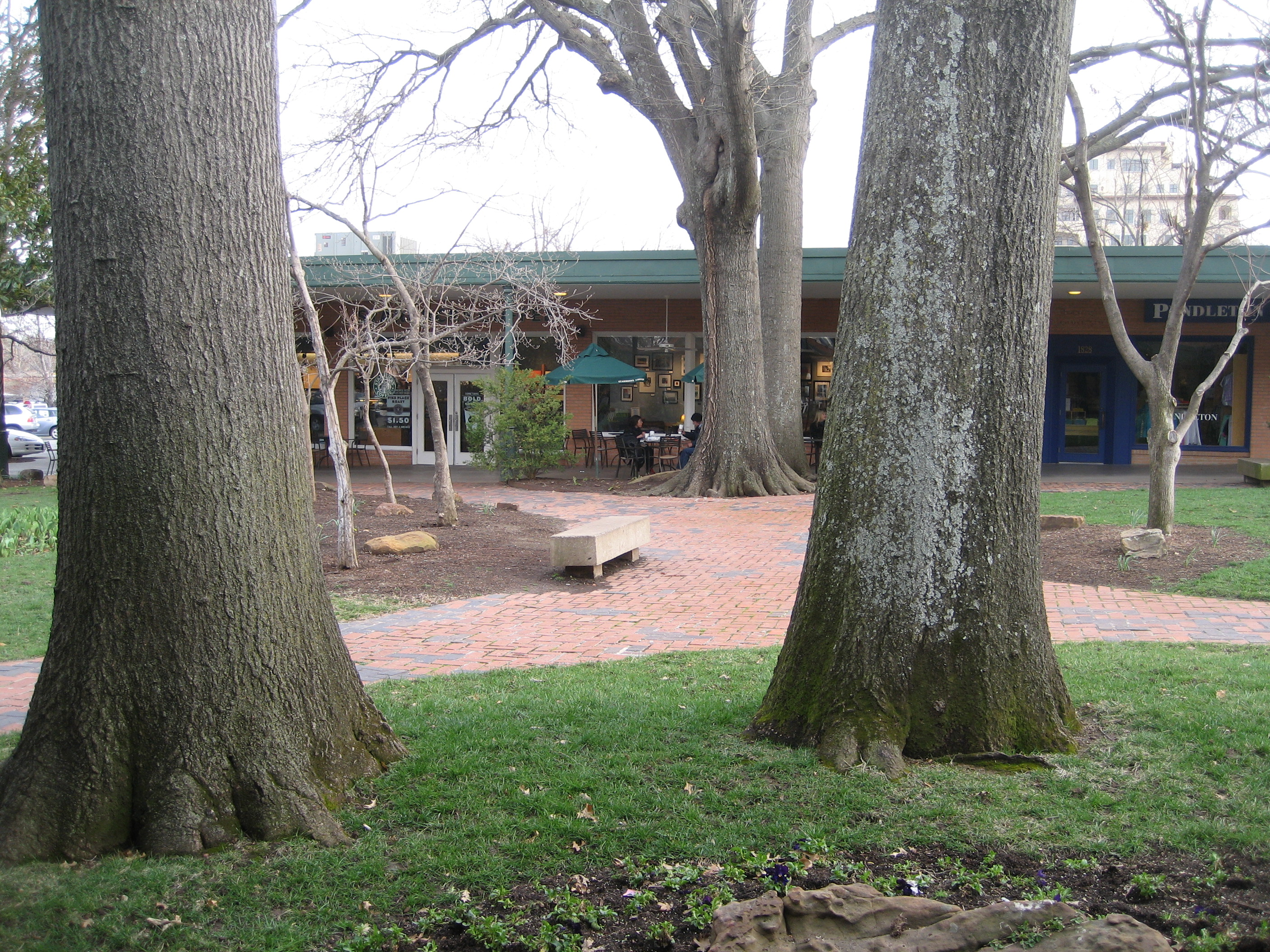
A courtyard in Utica Square

Some of the other major shopping centers in this part of the city include the Promenade Mall, Highland Park Shopping Center, Southroads, Ranch Acres, The Farm Shopping Center, and The Plaza. OU-Tulsa is across the street from the Promenade Mall at 41st and Yale, on the southern edge of Midtown.

In northeast Midtown, the Tulsa State Fairgrounds, now called Expo Square, is home to several Tulsa landmarks. In addition to the site being the former home to the minor league baseball Tulsa Drillers, the Art Deco Expo Square Pavilion, the Fair Meadows horse racing track, and the annual Tulsa State Fair, it boasts the SageNet Center, the largest clearspan building in the world, providing 354,000 square feet (33,000 m^{2}) of column-free space under a cable-suspended roof. In front of the SageNet Center is the Golden Driller, standing 76 feet (23 m) tall. Built in 1966 as a symbol for the International Petroleum Expo, the statue serves as a reminder of Tulsa's oily past.

The SageNet Center is also home to the annual Darryl Starbird Rod and Custom Show. Held in early February, it is touted as 'The World's Largest Indoor Car Show' and often draws around 1,500 custom and classic cars, trucks, and motorcycles. Antique car auctions are also held here, drawing many visitors from across the nation.

=== Arkansas River Parks ===
The Tulsa area boasts nearly 40 miles (64 km) of river shoreline along the Arkansas River. River Parks lines more than 20 miles (32 km) of that stretch, spread along both banks of the 1/4 mile wide channel and connected by a pedestrian bridge between 21st and 31st streets. River Parks is a popular destination for outdoor recreation. Miles of asphalt-surfaced recreation trails weave past picnic areas, playgrounds, fountains, and sculptures. The park's landscape ranges from the manicured lawns of the Gathering Place to the rugged terrain of the Turkey Mountain Urban Wilderness Area. Recreation in River Parks includes fishing, rowing, kayaking, disc golf, hiking, biking and horseback riding.

During the spring, summer, and early fall, concerts, festivals, and the state's largest free fireworks display (on the Fourth of July) are popular draws to the river. The festival park on the river's west bank is the site of Tulsa's Oktoberfest, one of the oldest and largest in the U.S.

=== Cherry Street ===
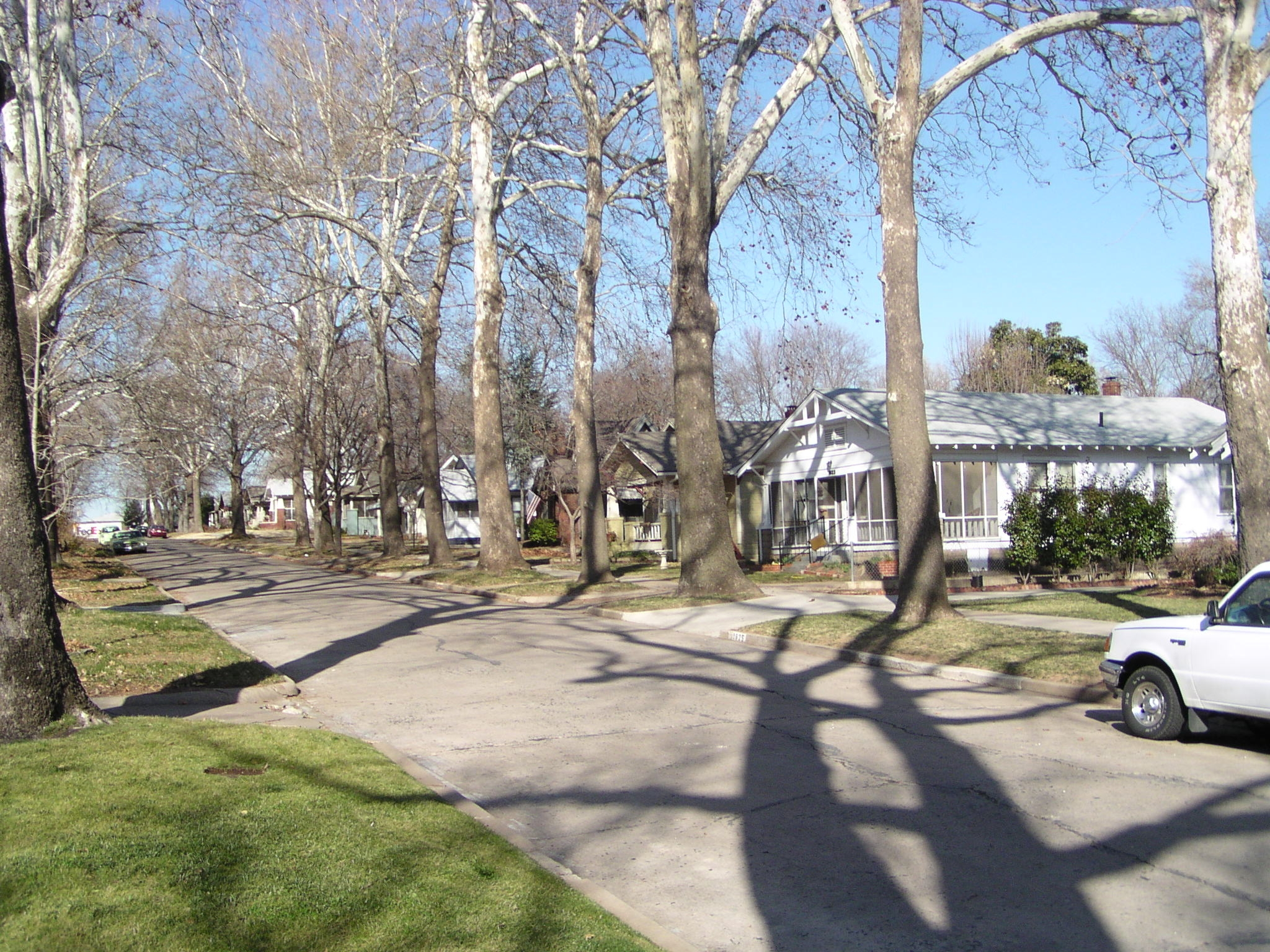
Swan Lake

Cherry Street is a neighborhood set near downtown in the northern midtown area, defined by a portion of 15th Street dubbed "Cherry Street." 15th Street has been a major east–west thoroughfare in Tulsa. This street was named Cherry Street, until a city ordinance introduced in the early 1900s mandated the use of numerical street names. The eastern and western boundaries of the present-day district are rather vaguely defined in common usage; a 1992 article in the Tulsa World stated that the district extends from Peoria Avenue on the west to Utica Avenue on the east. The northern and southern boundaries of this informal district are apparently undefined.

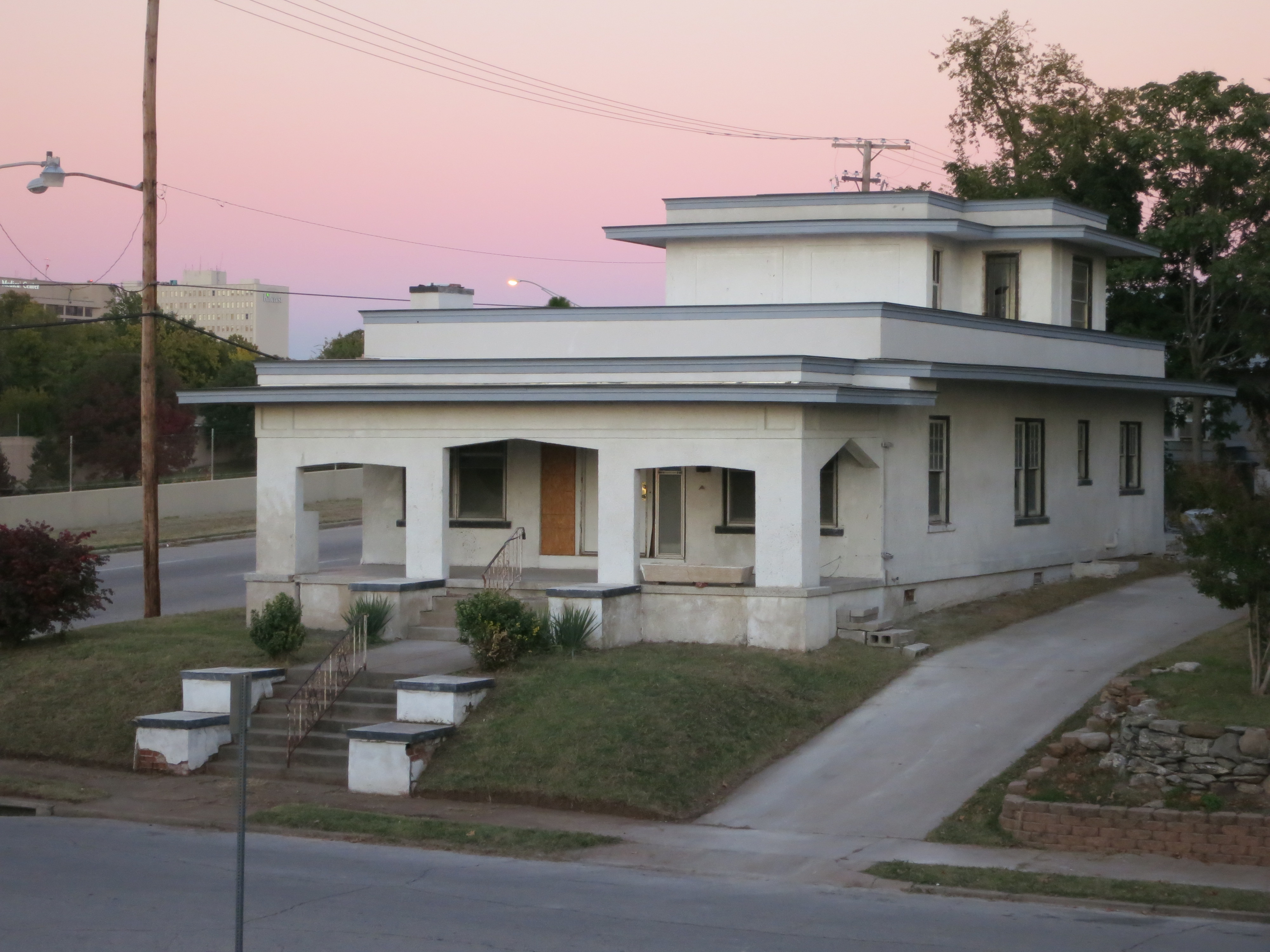
McGregor House

South Quaker Avenue intersects Cherry Street one block east of Peoria. The 1400 block of South Quaker contains five houses of historical interest because they represent the style of homes constructed during the very early 1920s. The most notable is known as McGregor House at 1401 South Quaker, at the intersection of Quaker and 14th Street. It is a 1 1/2-story Prairie Style house designed about 1920 by Bruce Goff, then a 15-year-old apprentice with the Rush, Endacott and Rush architecture firm. The house was listed on the National Register of Historic Places.

Visitors to this neighborhood can find many local restaurants, boutique shops, Peace of Mind Bookstore, art galleries, antique shops, vintage stores and a scooter shop now filling old storefronts built in the 1920s & 1930s, as well as some notable old homes in the surrounding residential areas. Numerous condos have been built in recent years just north of Cherry Street. Cherry Street is surrounded by four of Tulsa's designated Historic Districts: the Swan Lake, North Maple Ridge, Gillette and Yorktown neighborhoods. Other neighborhoods adjacent to Cherry Street are Florence Park and the Renaissance neighborhood.

Skelly Mansion, Maple Ridge

=== Maple Ridge and Sunset Terrace ===
The Maple Ridge Historic District is just south of downtown in Midtown. This neighborhood contains 'Black Gold Row', contains mansions built by oil barons in the 1920s. Harwelden Mansion is located there.

Sunset Terrace is located adjacent to Maple Ridge on its South Side, Terwilleger Heights on its East Side and the Arkansas River to the West. It is traversed by the grand Woodward Boulevard, which links Maple Ridge to Brookside. Sunset Terrace contains many mansions built in the 1920s and 1930s.

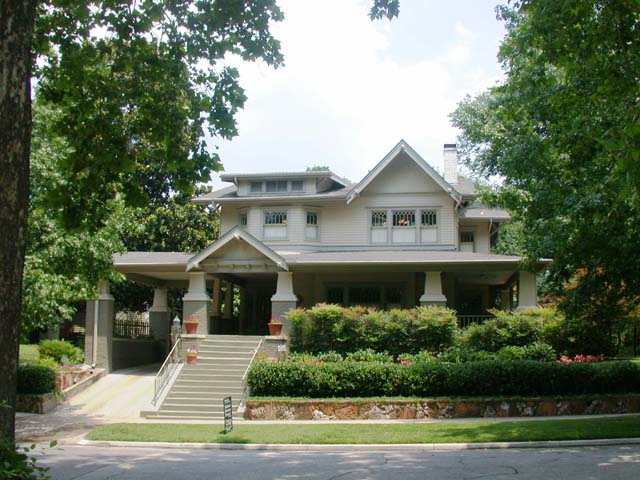
Large Craftsman, North Maple Ridge

=== Brookside ===
Brookside, like Cherry Street, is another popular shopping and entertainment district in Midtown. This area extends from the Arkansas River east to Lewis Avenue and south to 51st Street/Interstate 44. Its defining strip is South Peoria, between 31st and I-44, which is a popular commercial area featuring various upscale shops, boutiques, and art galleries, as well as 35 restaurants and nightspots (many with patio seating) offering a wide variety of cuisines and dining styles. River Parks, a diverse park landscape that stretches along the east bank of the river, is a popular section of Brookside, and includes the Gathering Place.

=== Lortondale ===
This is a subdivision of modern homes along South Yale Avenue near 26th Street. Based on a master plan by Tulsa architect Donald Honn, the low-pitch roofs and clean lines of the houses typify the style known as Mid-Century Modern, and the neighborhood was the city's first housing development with a community pool. Construction began in 1953 and all Lortondale homes featured central heating and air conditioning—reportedly the first such subdivision in the nation.

=== Kendall-Whittier ===
To the east of downtown is Tulsa's oldest suburban shopping area, which is noted for its abundance of red brick. It boasts primarily a mix of art studios, breweries, restaurants, and non-mainstream retail. The neighborhood's center, Whittier Square, hosts the Tulsa Farmers Market and is home to the non-profit arthouse Circle Cinema, Tulsa's oldest movie theater. The shopping area and surrounding neighborhoods are now popular with Tulsa's rapidly growing Hispanic community. Just east of this area is the University of Tulsa.

=== Ranch Acres ===
Recognized as a historic neighborhood, Ranch Acres was added the National Register of Historic Places in 2007. The neighborhood is an excellent example of a post-World War II ranch house subdivision. The area is situated primarily between 31st and 41st Streets along South Harvard.

=== Patrick Henry ===
The Patrick Henry Neighborhood was developed during the 1950s and 1960s and situated between Harvard and Yale at 41st Street south I-44. Patrick Henry is made up of ranch-style homes known for their open floorplans and large lots. Many of these homes were featured on the annual Parade of Homes tours that featured new and modern designs.

=== Highland and Whiteside Park Area ===
This area takes its name from the two larger neighborhood parks lying within it. The homes in this area are mostly ranch-style homes, some with pronounced mid-century modern design cues. It area overlaps with the Patrick Henry neighborhood, extending East of Yale Avenue to Bishop Kelley High School. Mockingbird Lake is in this neighborhood.

Although the neighborhood is primarily residential, it is also home the Tulsa Schusterman campus of University of Oklahoma (including the OU School of Community Medicine) and several commercial developments (most notably Tulsa Promenade).

=== Swan Lake Historic District ===
Swan Lake is a historic district whose borders consist of 15th Street to the North, Utica Street to the East, 21st Street to the South, and Peoria Avenue to the west. This area was originally named Orcutt District for the landowner, and the lake was originally a cattle watering place. It was the site of an amusement park in the early twentieth century, but is now notable for the number and architectural variety of houses and apartment buildings constructed in the 1920s and 1930s.

=== Terwilleger Heights ===
Terwilleger Heights is located immediately south and west of Utica Square bordered by 21st Street, 31st Street, Utica Avenue and Peoria Avenue. This area has early 1930s homes both grand and small, mature and many newly planted trees, winding streets and is adjacent to the Philbrook Museum of Art and Woodward Park, site of the Tulsa Rose Garden.

=== Renaissance ===
Renaissance neighborhood is between 11th Street (Route 66) and 15th Street and Lewis Avenue on the west to Harvard Avenue on the east with Delaware Avenue cutting through the middle. The University of Tulsa is just north of 11th St. on the east side of Delaware. It's a mix of 1920s bungalows and 1930s revival style houses with houses of other eras mixed in, from very new to a few pre-20s houses that were moved from the site of Central High School (now the PSO HQ) in the mid 20s. Renaissance is also a mix of single family homes and a number of duplexes and the east side of Delaware has housed many TU students over the years.

=== Florence Park & Florence Park South ===
The Florence Park and Florence Park South neighborhoods are bounded by Harvard Avenue on the east, the Broken Arrow Expressway on the south and west, and 15th Street on the north. The area contains a mix of 1920s and 1930s houses, mostly in revival styles. They were among the first midtown Tulsa neighborhoods to experience residential reinvestment following the movement to the suburbs in the 1960s and 1970s.

=== White City ===
White City is a residential neighborhood in Midtown, Tulsa, Oklahoma. It is bounded on the north by 2nd Street, on the east by Fulton Avenue, on the south by 11th Street and on the west by Yale Avenue. The neighborhood was added to the National Register of Historic Places in 2001. The area includes 480 buildings, of which 325 retain their historic significance. Two parks are also included in the listing.

== Northside ==
Tulsa's north side originally referred to the area north of the Frisco Railroad tracks up to the northern city limits. It was annexed by the city of Tulsa in 1904. The north side is home to a large percentage of Tulsa's African-American community in addition to working-class Tulsans of other races and ethnicities. The area's Booker T. Washington High School, Tulsa's African-American high school during the segregation era and now a magnet school, was recently judged to be the 58th best high school in the nation by Newsweek. Northeast of downtown, close to Tulsa International Airport, is Mohawk Park, which includes the Tulsa Zoo and the Oxley Nature Center, and the Tulsa Air and Space Museum. This area is also home to the American Airlines maintenance facility, one of Tulsa's largest employers.

=== The Greenwood Historical District: "Black Wall Street" ===
The Greenwood Historical District is just north of downtown and east of the Brady District. It was once one of the most affluent African American communities in the United States, referred to as Black Wall Street. In 1921, thirty-five blocks of businesses and residences were burned in this district during the infamous Tulsa Race Massacre, the bloodiest incident of racial violence in the history of the United States. The Oklahoma Legislature passed laws in 2001 aimed at revitalizing Greenwood, setting up a scholarship fund for college-bound descendants of the victims, and appropriating $2 million for a memorial.

As of 2004, two blocks of the old neighborhood have been restored on the corner of Archer Street and Greenwood Avenue as part of the Greenwood Historical District. It is now home to the Greenwood Cultural Center, the Greenwood Rising Historical Center, and the John Hope Franklin Center for Reconciliation. The area is also notable for the ONEOK Field, home of the city's minor league baseball team, the Tulsa Drillers, as well as Oklahoma State University - Tulsa and Langston University.

=== The Arts District ===
The Arts District is located north of the Santa Fe Railroad tracks from the central business district and centered at Main Street & Brady Avenue. The Arts District is one of Tulsa's oldest areas, characterized by two-story brick warehouses.

The district and the street were originally named after W. Tate Brady, an early Tulsa business owner and active civic promoter. However, Tate Brady's involvement as a leader in the Tulsa Ku Klux Klan in the 1920s led to residents expressing their wish that the name be changed, and on August 15, 2013, the City Council voted to retain the street name, but instead officially honor Civil War photographer Mathew Brady. Street signs have since been changed to reflect the official street name as "M.B. Brady St."

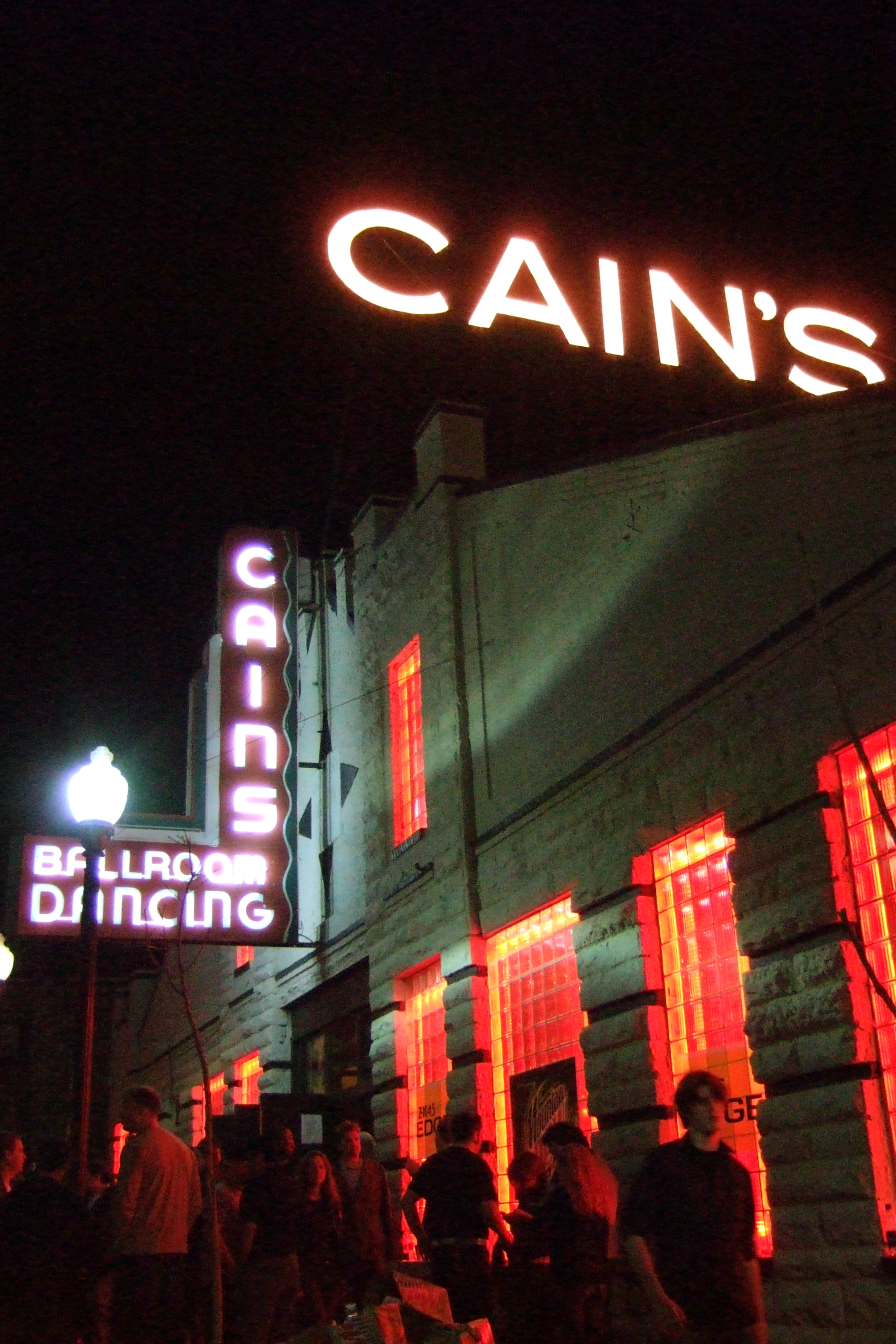
Cain's Ballroom

The Tulsa Theater, originally known as The Brady Theater, was built between 1912 and 1914 and was initially designed to serve as the city's municipal auditorium. It was simply called "Convention Hall" for the first forty years of its life and was one of three internment camps where African Americans were detained after the 1921 Tulsa Race Massacre. In 1952, major additions were made, and the building was renamed Tulsa Municipal Theater. The building was listed on the National Register of Historic Places in 1979. Supplanted as the city auditorium in 1979 by the construction of the Performing Arts Center in downtown, "the Old Lady on Brady" continues to be used today for a wide variety of concerts and theatrical productions.

North of the Tulsa Theater on Main Street is the Cain's Ballroom, formerly the garage of the Brady family and the home of Bob Wills and his western swing band, the Texas Playboys. The district is also home to many local artists' galleries, restaurants with late-night hours, bars, and dance clubs. It is also an emerging gay neighborhood, with several gay or gay-friendly bars and numerous supportive shops and restaurants.

Today, the Arts District is one of the most diverse areas in all of Tulsa. It hosts restaurants, clubs, museums, and businesses and is a prime example of urban living. The neighborhood's renaissance includes the openings of the Woody Guthrie Center, the Bob Dylan Center, and the Guthrie Green, a public garden and outdoor stage that hosts community events, live music, and a market.

=== The Heights Historic District ===
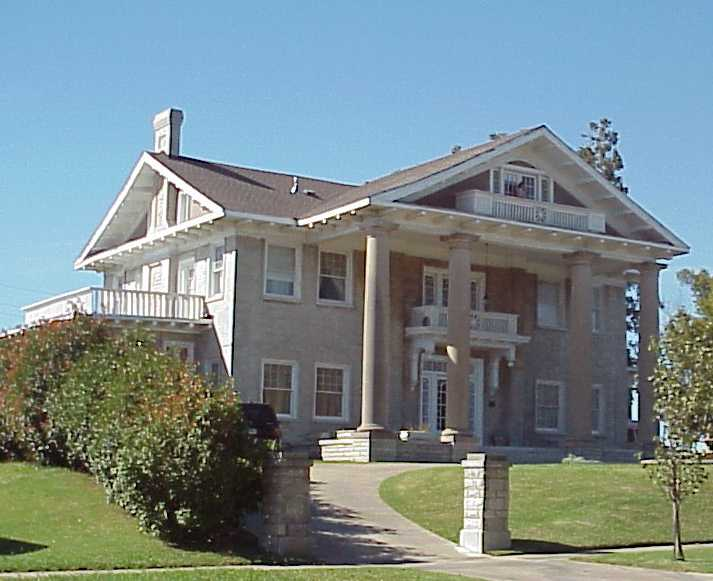
Brady mansion on North Denver Avenue

The Heights is a historic district Northwest of Downtown. Like the Arts District, the neighborhood was initially named after politician W. Tate Brady, but was changed due to his affiliation with the Ku Klux Klan. It is sometimes still referred to as Brady Heights.

Its boundaries are Marshall Street to the north, the alley between Cheyenne Avenue and Main Street to the east, Fairview Street to the south, and the Osage Expressway right-of-way to the west. From the territorial days until the 1920s, The Heights was an important part of the then-fashionable North Side of Tulsa. Young professional businessmen and oil men, like G. Y. Vandever, I. S. Mincks, and "Diamond Joe" Wilson, owned homes there.

=== North Cheyenne Historic District ===
The North Cheyenne Historic District is bounded on the north by an alley between Archer and Brady Streets, on the east by the alley between Boulder and Cheyenne avenues, on the South by the Frisco railroad tracks, and on the west by North Denver Avenue. It was a commercial and industrial area that developed during the early twentieth century. According to the Tulsa Preservation Commission, the district "...was added to the National Register of Historic Places on December 13, 2010, under Criterion A for significance in commerce. Its NRIS number is 10001011."

=== Owen Park ===
The history of the Owen Park neighborhood dates back to the early 19th century. Washington Irving described the area in his book, "Tour of the Prairies." A monument in Tulsa's Owen Park denotes the point where the lands of the Osage, Creek, and Cherokee nations met. The first American settler was Chauncey Owen, the husband of a Creek woman who was eligible for a land allotment. This land later became the Owen Park neighborhood. Its borders are Edison Avenue on the north, the municipal Owen Park on the east, the Keystone Expressway (Hwy 412) on the south, and Zenith Avenue on the west. Owen Park is a rapidly gentrifying historic neighborhood that has historic mansions and Craftsman-style homes. It is one of the closest neighborhoods to the Arts District and downtown Tulsa.

=== Gilcrease Museum ===
Gilcrease Museum main entrance

Northwest of downtown on the Osage Indian Reservation is the Gilcrease Museum, considered by many to be the finest Western American and American Indian art collection in the world. Thomas Gilcrease was a member of the Creek Nation who became very wealthy after oil was discovered on his allotment. He invested a significant portion of his wealth in art and opened a gallery on his estate in northwest Tulsa in 1949. He deeded the art collection, building, and grounds to the City of Tulsa during the mid-1950s.

=== Phoenix District ===
Sharon Hanson, president of the North Star Neighborhood Association, approached an official in the Mayor's office, and money was put in the budget for the 36th Street North corridor. The community chose the Phoenix District as the new name. The Phoenix District is the home of the OU Physicians Wayman Tisdale Specialty Clinic.

== Southside ==
Tulsa's south side is popularly considered to be south of the Skelly Bypass (I-44), bounded on the south by the city of Bixby, on the west by the Arkansas River and the city of Jenks, and on the east by the city of Broken Arrow. Many new luxurious homes have been constructed here in the last few decades, as well as numerous apartments, in various price ranges. Land in the area is becoming scarce, however, and development has begun to spread to neighboring Jenks and Bixby to the south and west, as well as Broken Arrow to the east. As a more affluent demographic has moved into the area, businesses tailored to such residents have also opened nearby. The city's largest automotive dealerships are located along S. Memorial Dr., from 91st to 101st Streets, and from 51st to 31st Streets. The Riverwalk Crossing Shopping Center, just over the river in Jenks at 96th Street, includes a movie theater, fine dining, and shopping. Nearby lies the Oklahoma Aquarium, the only one in the state of Oklahoma. Local freshwater fish are complemented by a fine selection of saltwater animals, including sharks. The Karl and Beverly White National Fishing Tackle Museum has over 20,000 pieces valued at more than $4 million. This exhibit makes up the largest and most comprehensive antique fishing tackle collection in the world.

St. Francis Hospital and its surrounding medical practitioners' offices, located at 61st and Yale, are one of the largest in the state. Prominent in that area of town is the upscale Braeswood neighborhood, East 61st to 63rd Streets and Louisville to Oswego Avenues. Another healthcare cluster exists around South 91st and Mingo, including Hillcrest Hospital South and Saint Francis Hospital South. Woodland Hills Mall, the largest in the state anchors the 71st street corridor. Numerous dining options are available in the area. Additionally, shopping centers surrounding the mall are panoramic in scope, as the options for shopping are seemingly endless. The 4-star John Q. Hammonds Renaissance Hotel is situated in this area, offering conference and meeting rooms. It is located right off US 169, a major north–south highway in eastern south Tulsa. This road curves to the west at around 96th street and soon turns into the Creek Turnpike, a toll road that has been extended to the west to I-44 and to the east to I-44, nearly forming a semi-circular loop around southern Tulsa and its surrounding suburbs. The schools in the area are some of the state's largest, including Jenks and Union public schools, with neighboring Broken Arrow being the largest. Tulsa Public School's Memorial High School is located here, along with prestigious, private Holland Hall. Jenks and Union High Schools are annually among the best in the state and nation in football, and their rivalry has drawn national attention. Tulsa Community College, the largest 2-year school in the state, has its Southeast campus off 81st and US 169. Parks in the area include LaFortune Park, with 2 public golf courses, playgrounds, a swimming pool, and a jogging trail, Hunter Park, with a disc golf course, a jogging trail, a playground, and a fishing pond, and the Riverparks, which extend south to 101st St.

Some of the largest and most influential churches in the country, including Victory Christian, Kirk of the Hills Presbyterian, Asbury United Methodist, South Tulsa Baptist, and Grace Church, are located in this part of Tulsa.

=== Southeast Tulsa ===
Southeast Tulsa is generally considered to be south of 41st Street South and east of South Sheridan Road, extending to the city limits of Bixby and Broken Arrow. Union Schools serves most of these residents, with a handful of neighborhoods being served by Tulsa Public Schools and Broken Arrow Public Schools (further east). Neighborhood Parks, soccer fields, sports fields, and public pools are located within the area. There are multiple corporate offices and other businesses in the area that staff large workforces. A wide variety of shopping and dining options can be found in southeast Tulsa. The area offers easy access to I-244, I-44, Hwy 169 (Mingo Valley Expressway), the Creek Turnpike, and the Broken Arrow Expressway. Such easy access makes it quick to drive to desired locations and businesses in Downtown, Midtown, Southside, Westside, the Airport, and all the major shopping/entertainment areas of the city, as well as to the outlying cities of Broken Arrow, Owasso, Bixby, and Jenks. The area offers housing built from the early 1970s to the present.

The historic and now largely abandoned community of Alsuma, Oklahoma lies in this area. Alsuma was annexed by Tulsa in 1966 and is now listed as a ghost town.

=== Southern Hills ===
Southern Hills is an exclusive neighborhood on the south side that is centered on the Southern Hills Country Club at 61st and Lewis. Southern Hills Country Club has hosted 13 major golf championships, including four U.S. Opens. Many of the original homes in this neighborhood are sprawling suburban ranch-style homes.

== Eastside ==
Tulsa's east side is a suburban-style area located roughly east of Sheridan Road, north of 41st Street South, and south of Tulsa International Airport. Constructed largely in the 1950s, 1960s, and 1970s, attractions in this part of the city include McClure Park, which is notable for its disc golf course, the Carl Smith Athletic Complex, and the popular Admiral Twin Drive-In movie theatre. There is also a large portion of Route 66 on Tulsa's east side. Areas that fall within the Union and Broken Arrow School districts are increasingly attracting high-income professionals seeking suburban life within city limits. Mayo Demonstration Academy, a magnet school of the Tulsa Public School system, is located in this area. Eastgate Metroplex and East Central High School are also in this area. Additionally, the area is home to Tulsa's Eastern hospitality district, which is home to numerous hotels.

East Tulsa is also home to growing Mexican-American and Vietnamese-American populations (the latter centered around St. Joseph Vietnamese Catholic Church).

Redbud Valley Nature Preserve is also located in this part of the city.

== Westside ==
Communities of Tulsa's west side within the city limits are Red Fork, Carbondale, Garden City, and Turkey Mountain. Other communities considered a part of the west side, but located in Creek County, are Oakhurst, Oakridge, and Allen-Bowden.

West Tulsa is another reminder of Tulsa's oil-rich past. Two oil refineries remain in operation to this day on the west bank of the river. This large industrial area gives way to wooded and hilly neighborhoods. The classic art deco Webster High School is here, as is the popular train-themed Ollie's Station Restaurant, sitting next to the Tulsa rail yard. Other schools in West Tulsa include Berryhill High School, Robertson Elementary, Park Elementary, and Clinton West Elementary. Webster is the oldest existing high school facility in Tulsa and has an active alumni association. Portions of Route 66 pass through the west side. The area is broken up into several sections, including Carbondale and Red Fork, among others.

The Riverparks system, located on the bank of the river, includes the Riverwest Festival Park, featuring a floating stage amphitheater that overlooks downtown. Riverwest is home to such popular events as Tulsa's Oktoberfest, one of the largest of its kind in North America, and the Gatesway Balloon Festival.

Tulsa's westside is also home to The Oaks Country Club, one of Tulsa's three major country clubs, and Inverness Village, a large retirement community. In addition to these companies, Camp Loughridge, a Christian Summer Camp operates on 186 acres of land in West Tulsa.
