= Brookside, Tulsa =

Neighborhood in Tulsa, Oklahoma

Brookside
- Neighborhood of Tulsa, Oklahoma
- Country: United States
- State: Oklahoma
- City: Tulsa
- Area code: 918

Brookside is a commercial and residential neighborhood in Tulsa, Oklahoma south of downtown. The neighborhood is roughly bounded by South 31st St on the north, South 51st St on the south, S Lewis Ave on the east, and the Arkansas River on the west. South Peoria Ave runs as the neighborhood's main thoroughfare.

The neighborhood contains many residential homes, commercial storefronts, restaurants, and historic landmarks. The River Parks along Riverside Drive is a diverse park landscape stretching along the neighborhood's Arkansas River boundary and includes the Gathering Place.

== History ==
Brookside first began in the 1920s after the expansion of Tulsa's oil industry and the city became known as the Oil Capitol of the World.

The neighborhood saw prominent growth in the 1940s as a suburban mixed-use haven during the economic impacts of World War II. During this time, local drugstore owner Guy Scroggs was the first to dub the neighborhood Brookside, naming his store "Brookside Drug". The titular brook is believed to be Crow Creek, which runs through the north end of the neighborhood as well as the gardens of the Philbrook Museum of Art.

The 1950s post-war period brought about a building boom to Brookside. The neighborhood welcomed new businesses, churches, and schools as veterans, families, and students relocated south of Downtown Tulsa. The term "Restless Ribbon" was frequently used to describe the rampant automobile traffic along South Peoria Ave during this time.

== Features ==
=== The Village ===
The main strip of the neighborhood, known as "The Village", runs along South Peoria Ave from 32nd to 41st Street. This is the most dense strip of commercial development in Brookside and is one of the city's most popular entertainment districts. Notable features include the restaurants Weber's Superior Root Beer, Brookside By Day, Shades of Brown Coffee, and Coney I-Lander Brookside. Zink Park sits to the right of South Peoria Ave on the north end of the strip.

The Brook Theater was a 600-seat movie theater that offered popular Saturday matinees and housed the American Theater Company for 15 years. The building now houses The Brook Restaurant and Bar with the original neon sign and marquee still intact.

The City Veterinary Hospital is a Streamline-style Art Deco building built in 1942 by Koberling and Brandenbourg. It is still operational as a veterinary hospital.

In 1956, Koberling and Brandenbourg built the Brookside Broadcast Center. It is another example of Steamline Art Deco in the neighborhood and currently houses KJRH-TV for Channel 2 News.

In 1951, Archie and Lola Pennington opened Pennington's Drive-In, a popular drive-in restaurant that became impactful in the city's culinary scene. The restaurant had over 60 parking stalls and served burgers, shrimp baskets, and black bottom pie. Its speaker ordering system, the "Order-Matic", was later adopted by Troy Smith in 1959 for the first Sonic Drive-In in Stillwater, Oklahoma. In 1973, a fire destroyed over half of the restaurant, but it was quickly rebuilt. Pennington's closed in 1987.

Van's Hamburgers was a hamburger stand opened near East 38th St in the 1950s. In 1954, the stand was converted to Claud's Hamburgers and became a neighborhood staple. The restaurant closed in 2022 following the death of its owner, Robert Hobson.

=== River Parks ===
The River Parks along Riverside Drive is a section of the Tulsa River Parks on Brookside's Arkansas River boundary. It is part of a 26-mile outdoor recreation corridor protected by the River Parks Authority. The Brookside section includes access to green spaces, playgrounds, fountains, and sculptures as well as asphalt trails, sports courts, and a disc golf course.

Brookside contains the 41st Street Plaza, formally QuickTrip Park, as well as the lower end of the Gathering Place, the largest privately-funded public park in U.S. history. The lower end of the park includes walking trails, sports courts, a BMX pump track and skate park, as well as the Discovery Lab, a hands-on children's museum dedicated to science and technology. The park also offers waterfront access to Zink Lake through the ONEOK Boathouse.
