= Lookout Mountain (Oklahoma) =

Hill in Tulsa, Oklahoma, United States

- Location within Oklahoma

Highest point
- Elevation: 932 ft (284 m)
- Prominence: 197 ft (60 m)
- Parent peak: Sierra Grande
- Coordinates: 36°07′00″N 96°01′27″W

Geography
- Location: West Tulsa, Oklahoma, United States
- Topo map: USGS Sapulpa North

Lookout Mountain is located in West Tulsa, Oklahoma. Although named Lookout Mountain, the "mountain" is actually a large hill. The east end of the hill overlooks the BNSF trainyard. KTUL, a local television station is on Lookout Mountain. To the north of Lookout Mountain are several industrial businesses, including the trash-to-energy plant. To the south stretches the community of Red Fork. The west end of Lookout Mountain connects to other hills in West Tulsa, including Cowbell Hill and Anderson Hill. It is 55.86 miles (89.90 km) from Sierra Grande, its line parent.
