= Braithwaite, Oklahoma =

- Ghost town
- Location within Oklahoma Location within the United States
- Coordinates: 35°22′25.18″N 99°3′3.03″W
- Country: United States
- State: Oklahoma
- County: Washita
- Elevation: 1,591 ft (485 m)
- Time zone: UTC-6 (Central (CST))
  - Summer (DST): UTC-5 (CDT)
- Area code: 580
- GNIS feature ID: 1100233

Braithwaite is a ghost town in Washita County, Oklahoma, United States. Nothing currently remains there, besides a rail depot.

== Geography ==
Braithwaite was 4 miles (6.4 km) west of Bessie, Oklahoma, and 9 miles (14 km) from the county seat of New Cordell, Oklahoma.

== History ==
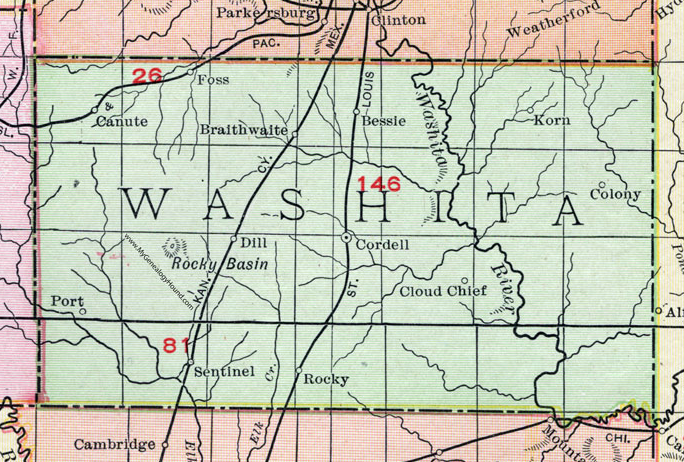
Braithwaite in Washita County, Oklahoma, in 1911

Historical population
Census	Pop.	Note	%±
1920	31		—
1940	25		—

Braithwaite was established in 1907, four miles west of Bessie. It was named for J.S. Braithwaite, a stockholder of the Kansas City, Mexico and Orient Railway. The new town of Braithwaite on the Orient's main line was announced in October 1907; Braithwaite was platted that year. The new town was soon home to a drugstore, among other businesses.

Braithwaite's post office was established on October 7, 1910.

The Braithwaite schoolhouse was completed in November 1916, with classes set to begin that December.

Braithwaite's population in 1920 was 31.

The Braithwaite post office was discontinued on January 31, 1923.

Parts of the Braithwaite School District were ceded to the Burns Flat School District in 1931. Further portions of the Braithwaite School District were ceded to Burns Flat in May 1933, August 1938, and October 1939. The remaining portions of the Braithwaite school district were merged into the Burns Flat School District on July 16, 1947.

Braithwaite's population was 25 in 1940.

== See also ==
- Alsuma, Oklahoma
- History of Oklahoma
- List of ghost towns in Oklahoma
