= Temple Shalom of Northwest Arkansas =

Synagogue in Fayetteville, Arkansas, United States

- Location in Arkansas

Religion
- Affiliation: Judaism
- Rite: (Unaffiliated)
- Ecclesiastical or organizational status: Synagogue
- Leadership: Rabbi Jacob Adler (Emeritus)
- Status: Active

Location
- Location: 699 North Sang Avenue, Fayetteville, Arkansas
- Country: United States
- Interactive map of Temple Shalom of Northwest Arkansas
- Coordinates: 36°04′26″N 94°11′22″W

Architecture
- Type: Synagogue
- General contractor: Fadil Bayyari
- Established: 1981 (as a congregation)
- Completed: 2009
- Site area: 1 acre (4,000 m^{2})

Website
- templeshalomnwa.org

Temple Shalom of Northwest Arkansas is an unaffiliated Jewish congregation and synagogue, located at 699 North Sang Avenue, in the Fayetteville area of Arkansas, in the United States. The small, mixed-denomination congregation is affiliated with the Union for Reform Judaism, yet it supports a variety of activities and services for Jews of all backgrounds.

== Early history ==
Breaking ground for the 2009 building

Students from the congregation's religious school

Arising out of an independent minyan from the 1970s, Temple Shalom was formed on February 23, 1981, following a meeting of approximately 30 people in Fayetteville on January 21, 1981 held with Rabbi Lawrence Jackofsky of the Southwest Council, Union of American Hebrew Congregations of Dallas.

A month later, Rabbi Norbert L. Rosenthal, emeritus rabbi of Temple Israel in Tulsa, Oklahoma was invited to serve as the first rabbi. At the consecration ceremony on April 25, 1981, the officers of the newly-formed organization were installed. Temple Shalom arranged to use the Unitarian Universalist Fellowship Hall for monthly services. The religious school that was founded in the 1960s was organized and conducted by parent volunteers and took place at the Sam Barg Hillel House at 607 Storer Avenue.

== Building history ==
In 1999, the University of Arkansas Hillel began leasing a building from the University at 608 N. Storer Avenue. Temple Shalom leased space in this building. Larger gatherings continued to take place at the neighboring Unitarian Universalist Fellowship.

In 2004, when Temple Shalom was growing out of that building, some members from the Rogers and Bentonville area decided to form a new congregation in Bentonville, called Congregation Etz Chaim, temporarily easing the need for Temple Shalom to move again to a bigger facility.

By 2005, Temple Shalom had again grown and needed its own building. The membership included nearly 60 families. There were about 30 children attending the religious school, several of whom celebrated their Bar and Bat Mitzvah each year. The project to acquire a building for Fayetteville's first synagogue was launched in 2005, headed by the synagogue's president.

In 2006, Fadil Bayyari, a local Palestinian Muslim builder, from Springdale, proposed to build a new building for Temple Shalom at his cost, a savings of an estimated 20% of the total cost of the project, or $250,000. Bayyari's offer spurred much interest in the local and national press.

In 2007 Temple Shalom purchased a little less than 1 acre (4,000 m^{2}) at the corner of Sang Avenue and Cleveland Street to create a facility for Temple Shalom, University of Arkansas Hillel, and to house a multicultural library. This building was completed in 2009.

== Clergy ==
Until 2006, Temple Shalom was served by a variety of visiting rabbis, student rabbis, and cantors, who made monthly visits to Fayetteville during the academic year. In 2006, Jacob Adler, a University of Arkansas professor of philosophy, became the first resident rabbi after he had recently acquired his rabbinical ordination. Adler led the congregation into 2020.
