= Temple Israel (Tulsa, Oklahoma) =

Reform synagogue in Tulsa, Oklahoma

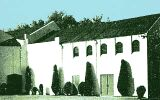

- Location in Oklahoma

Religion
- Affiliation: Reform Judaism
- Ecclesiastical or organizational status: Synagogue
- Leadership: Rabbi Michael Weinstein
- Status: Active

Location
- Location: 2004 East 22nd Place, Tulsa, Oklahoma
- Country: United States
- Interactive map of Temple Israel
- Coordinates: 36°07′50″N 95°57′46″W

Architecture
- Architect: Percival Goodman
- Type: Synagogue
- Established: 1914 (as a congregation)
- Completed: 1919 (14th and Cheyenne Sts.); 1932 (S. Cheyenne St.); 1955 (E. 22nd Pl.)

Website
- templetulsa.com

Temple Israel is a Reform Jewish congregation and synagogue located at 2004 East 22nd Place in Tulsa, Oklahoma, in the United States. Founded in 1914, the congregation affiliated with the Union for Reform Judaism in 1915, and constructed its first building on the corner of 14th and Cheyenne Streets in 1919. Early rabbis included Jacob Menkes, Charles Latz, Samuel Kaplan, Jacob Krohngold, and Benjamin Kelsen.

In 1932, Temple Israel constructed a new building on South Cheyenne. Rabbis there included Hyman Iola, Abraham Shusterman, Randall Falk, and Morton C. Fierman. In 1955 the congregation moved to its current home, a building on East 22nd Place designed by Percival Goodman. Rabbis serving in this building have included Norbert Rosenthal (1951–1976), Charles Sherman (1976–2013), and Karen and Micah Citrin (2013–2016), Jim Simon (2016-2018), and Michael Weinstein (2018–present).

Membership rose from 54 families in 1919 to 170 in 1943 and peaked at 585 families in 1985, but fell to 425 by 2011, and 375 by 2019. Temple Israel is Tulsa's oldest synagogue, and only Reform synagogue.

== Early history, South Cheyenne building ==
Temple Israel was founded in December 1914, and joined the Union of American Hebrew Congregations (now the Union for Reform Judaism) in 1915. That year the congregation held its first services, for Rosh Hashanah. Its first religious leader was Abraham J. Feldman, who, at the time, was studying at the Reform Hebrew Union College in Cincinnati. He served until 1915. In 1917, the members hired Jacob B. Menkes as their first rabbi. A 1910 graduate of the Jewish Theological Seminary of America, he served until 1919; at the time, the congregation had just 54 members.

That year the congregation occupied its first permanent building (until then services had been held in a series of temporary premises), at a cost of $75,000 (today $1,390,000). Located at 1306 South Cheyenne (at 14th Street), it was, according to some sources, the oldest synagogue building in Oklahoma. It was eventually abandoned and fell into disuse, occupied only by the homeless seeking shelter, and was severely damaged by a fire on January 27, 2009, in which the roof and floors collapsed. In 2009, real estate developer Kevin Stephens stated that he planned to move forward with plans to save its facade and develop the building into a center for sustainability, community, and non-profit space.

Charles B. Latz, a 1914 graduate of Hebrew Union College, succeeded Menkes as rabbi in 1919. That same year a synagogue sisterhood was formed, followed the next year by a brotherhood. During the early 1920s the Tulsa All Souls Unitarian Church (founded 1921) met for a time in Temple Israel's building. At that time, some members proposed hiring the rabbi of Tulsa's Orthodox synagogue B'nai Emunah and merging with that congregation; the members were even willing to use the Orthodox siddur and wear kippahs; the merger did not go through.

Latz served until 1924. He was followed by Samuel S. Kaplan, a 1920 graduate of Hebrew Union College, who served from 1924 to 1927, then Jacob P. Krohngold, who joined in 1927. 1929 saw three rabbis at Temple Israel; Krohngold, who left that year, Benjamin Kelsen, who came and left that year, and Hyman Iola, a 1921 graduate of Hebrew Union College.

== South Rockford building ==
During Iola's tenure, in 1932, Temple Israel moved to another building, at 1602 South Rockford (at 16th Street), in what is now the Swan Lake historic district. That same year the congregation formed a choir. Iola was succeeded in 1935 by Abraham Shusterman. A 1931 graduate of Hebrew Union College, he served until 1941, moving to Baltimore, Maryland's Har Sinai Congregation. More traditional than his predecessors, Shusterman wore a robe and tallit (not a business suit) during services, introduced bar mitzvah ceremonies to Temple Israel, added Torah readings to the Friday night services, and Hebrew language instruction in Temple Israel's religious school. Membership grew to 200 families by 1935.

Shusterman was replaced in 1941 by Ely E. Pilchik. Pilchik had been born in Baranowicz, Poland, and had immigrated to the United States in 1920. He was a graduate of Hebrew Union College, but "was more traditional than the typical Reform rabbi". By 1943, the congregation had fallen to around 170 member families, but by 1945 it was up to 215 families. Pilchik served until 1947, moving to Newark, New Jersey's Temple B'nai Jeshurun.

Randall M. Falk also joined as rabbi in 1945. His tenure was only one year, until 1946, and he focused on Temple Israel's religious school. In 1947 Morton C. Fierman joined as rabbi, succeeding Pilchik, and served until 1951.

Fierman was succeed in 1951 by Norbert L. Rosenthal, who concentrated on "a variety of holiday celebrations and educational programs". Rosenthal had previously served as rabbi of Old York Road Temple in Willow Grove, Pennsylvania. In 1972, he allowed Oral Roberts to address the congregation at the bar mitzvah of a member. Rosenthal served until 1976, becoming rabbi emeritus until 1990. In 1981, he assisted in the establishing of Temple Shalom of Northwest Arkansas, and served thereafter as its first rabbi, visiting every other week to conduct Friday services.

During Rosenthal's tenure membership continued to grow, and the South Rockford building became too small to accommodate High Holiday services, which were held instead at the Tulsa University Student Union building. In 1955, the congregation moved to its present home at 2004 East 22nd Place, just south of the Utica Square Shopping Center. The South Rockford building was sold to Christ the King Catholic Church, which remodeled it so that it could be used as a fellowship hall. In 1975 it was renamed Fletcher Hall, after the former parish priest, and in 1991 it was removed to make way for a playground for students at Marquette Catholic School.

== East 22nd Place building ==
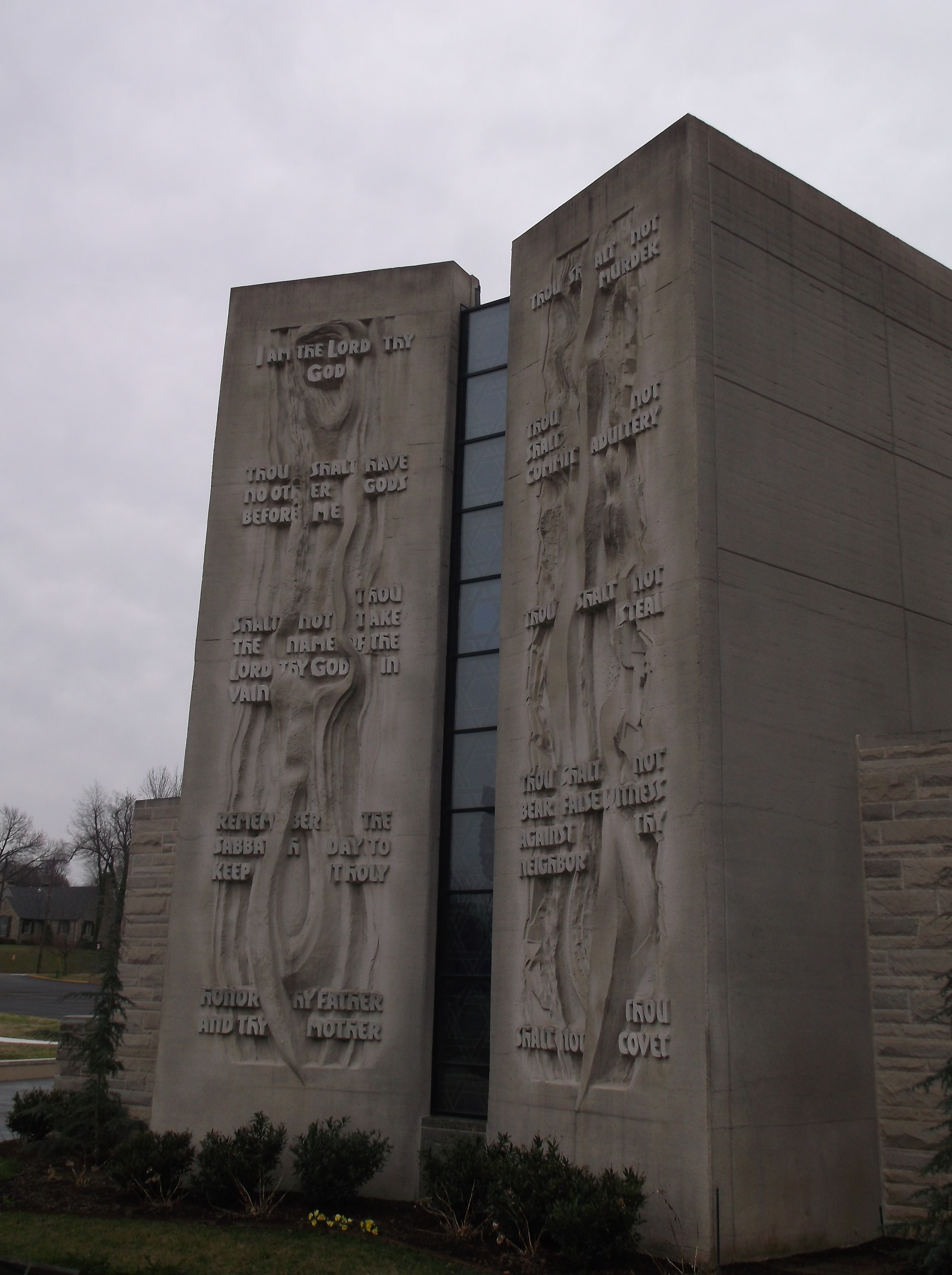
10 commandments on Temple Israel Tulsa

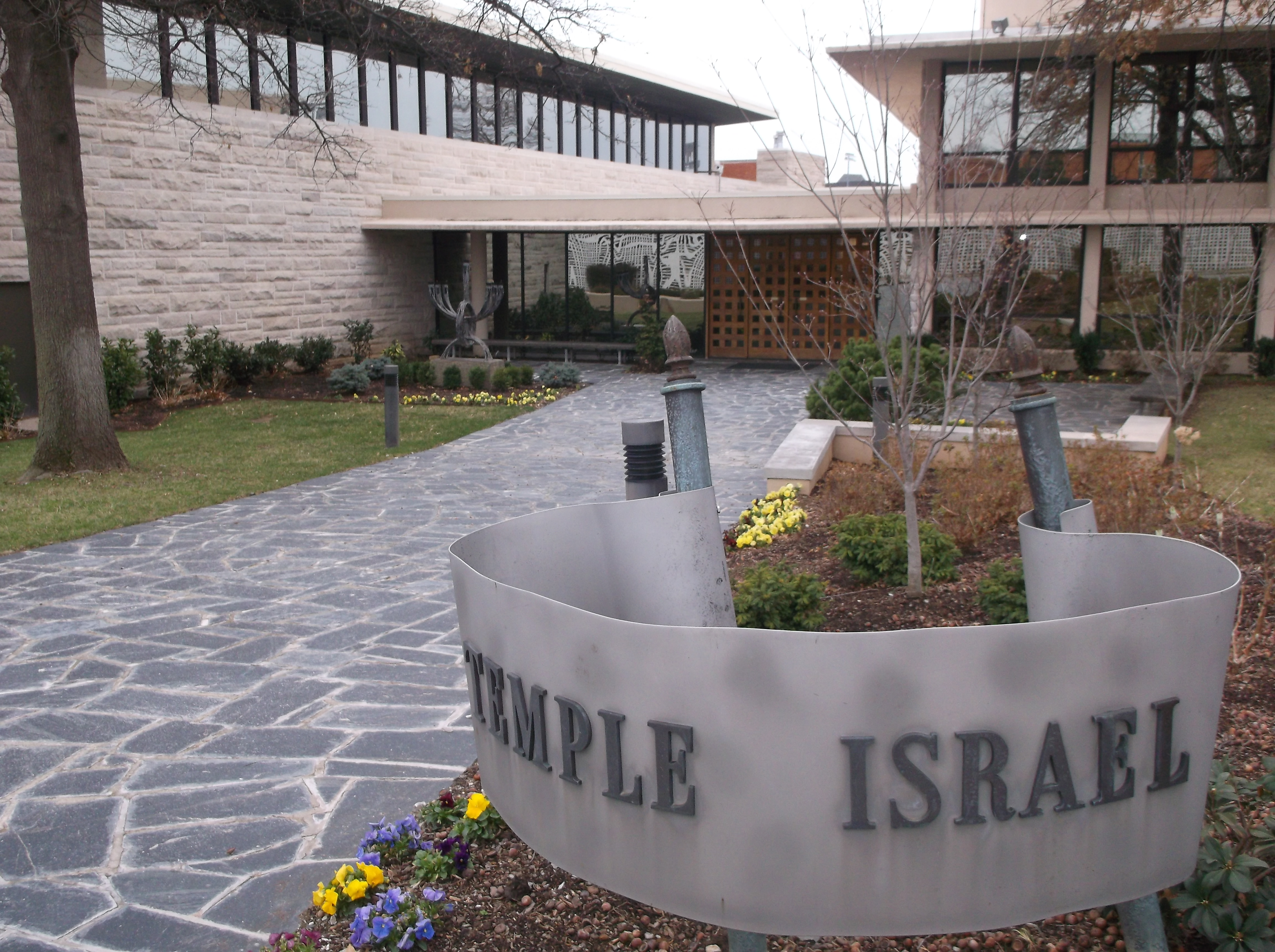
Temple Israel in Tulsa, Oklahoma

Designed by prolific synagogue architect Percival Goodman, the East 22nd Place synagogue's front is dominated by massive twin pillars displaying the Ten Commandments, which represent the biblical Pillar of Fire and the Pillar of Cloud. Goodman hired the sculptor Seymour Lipton to produce three works of ceremonial art for the sanctuary's bimah, "a ner tamid, a monumental seven-branch menorah, and an abstracted, vine motif that is placed along the top of the Torah Ark." The shape of the ner tamid "represents two sets of angels' wings that were set over the Ark in the ancient Temple of Solomon." The vine decoration contains pomegranates, "an ancient symbol of fruitfulness." The menorah, which is lit Fridays and holidays, "is symbolic of the Tree of Life". By 1962 membership had grown to 385 families.

Charles P. Sherman joined as rabbi in 1976 and retired in 2013. Originally from Pittsburgh, Pennsylvania, he graduated from the University of Pittsburgh and was ordained at Hebrew Union College in 1969. At Temple Israel, he focused on education, and created programs for mixed Jewish/non-Jewish couples and converts to Judaism. He was a strong supporter of the Oklahoma Chapter of the Religious Coalition for Abortion Rights, and garnered support for it from the Southwest Council of the Union of American Hebrew Congregations (now Union for Reform Judaism). He also "advocated social justice and religious action, as well as fuller participation in the Reform movement and community at large." While rabbi at Temple Israel, he also taught at the University of Tulsa and Phillips Theological Seminary, and served as president of the Southwest Association of Reform Rabbis, the Tulsa Ministerial Alliance, the Tulsa Police and Fire Chaplaincy Corps, the National Conference for Community and Justice (Tulsa Region) and the Tulsa Metropolitan Ministry. In 1979, he presided over the bar mitzvah at Temple Israel of future NFL football player and professional wrestler Bill Goldberg. That year membership was 525 families.

In 1984 the synagogue building flooded, and as part of the repairs, the congregation added a preschool. The following year membership peaked at 558 families, but by 1995 that had fallen to under 500. Sherman was inducted into the Tulsa Historical Society Hall of Fame in 2005, and in 2010 he was awarded the Russell Bennett Spiritual Inclusion Award by the Oklahomans for Equality. Sherman retired in 2013, becoming rabbi emeritus.

To succeed Sherman, Temple Israel selected a married couple, Micah and Karen Citrin, who had previously worked together as rabbis at Peninsula Temple Beth El in San Mateo, California. The Citrins met when both of them were studying for the rabbinate at Hebrew Union College in Los Angeles. Micah's father was the rabbi at New Mexico's oldest Jewish congregation, Congregation Albert in Albuquerque. The Citrins moved to Temple Beth David in Westwood, Massachusetts in 2016, and were succeeded by Jim Simon as interim rabbi.

Michael Weinstein became Temple Israel's rabbi in 2018. A graduate of University of Cincinnati and Xavier University (where he completed a Master's degree in Christian theology), he received his rabbinic ordination from Hebrew Union College in 2010. His wife Laurie Weinstein was appointed as the synagogue's cantor.

Temple Israel's membership has continued to fall, to 425 families in 2011, and 375 by 2019. Temple Israel is Tulsa's oldest synagogue, and only Reform synagogue.

In 2026, the synagogue was demolished and reconstruction began on a new synagogue on the same site. The 1955 tablets depicting the Ten Commandments were saved and will be integrated into the design of the new building.

== Notable members ==
- Bill Goldberg, NFL football player and undefeated wrestler
- Benedict I. Lubell, oil industry executive
