= Red Fork, Oklahoma =

Red Fork
- Unincorporated community
- Location within the state of Oklahoma Red Fork (the United States)
- Coordinates: 36°6′20″N 96°1′28″W
- Country: United States
- State: Oklahoma
- County: Tulsa
- Time zone: UTC-6 (Central (CST))
  - Summer (DST): UTC-5 (CDT)

Red Fork is a community in Southwest Tulsa. It was founded in 1883 as a railhead on the Arkansas River. It is famous for being the location of the first oil well in Tulsa County, the Sue A. Bland #1.

== Naming of the town ==
The town is sometimes said to have been named for the Cimarron River, but both forks there are far upstream and both are reddish. The river through Tulsa is a not a fork but a merger of the Cimmaron, but it is the reddish fork of the Arkansas from where it joins the normally blue-green Verdigris River downstream. The contrast in color was striking to early explorers coming upstream, and resulted in the naming of the river.

== Early days ==
Red Fork originally was on what was to become Route 66, stretching back to Lookout Mountain and west towards Berryhill. After the oil discovery, it looked like Red Fork might outdo Tulsa, but Tulsa boosters succeeded in attracting new people and businesses there. Also, Red Fork was limited in size by the bend of the river and by the steep hills. Tulsa annexed Red Fork on October 16, 1927, and in 1928 the post office lost its separate status and became Red Fork Station (now West Tulsa Station) of the Tulsa Post Office.

== The Sue A. Bland #1 ==
The Sue A. Bland #1 well was drilled by Drs. J.C.W. Bland and Fred S. Clinton in Red Fork. The well was on the homestead allotment of Dr. Bland's wife, Sue A. Bland, a Creek citizen. The well struck oil on 24 June 1901, and brought nationwide publicity and an oil speculation to the Tulsa region and Indian Territory.

== Town institutions ==
While mostly residential, Red Fork is home to television station KTUL (Channel 8); a unique; railroad-themed restaurant; an award-winning bed and breakfast in a 120-year-old rock home; Route 66-related businesses; historic schools; a BNSF railroad yard; and a popular Tulsa Park recreation center. Nearby are two colleges; a major Tulsa regional library; and oil and transportation-related businesses, among others.

Red Fork was once home to the Crystal City Amusement Park featuring a giant swimming pool and Tulsa's original, giant "Zingo Roller Coaster". The privately owned park was built in 1929, but went out of business in the 1950s, after both the Casa Loma bath house and dance hall buildings burned down.

== See also ==
- Glenn Pool Oil Reserve
