= Zink Lake =

Lake in Tulsa, Oklahoma, United States

Coordinates: 36.132°N 95.994°W

Zink Lake is a redeveloped man-made reservoir located along the Arkansas River in Tulsa, Oklahoma, designed as part of the city’s Vision Tulsa program to revitalize the riverfront with recreation, safety, and environmental improvements.

== History and Redevelopment ==
The lake traces its origins to the Zink Dam, constructed in 1982 to maintain consistent water levels in the Arkansas River through Tulsa. Over decades, sediment buildup and mechanical wear degraded the structure, limiting recreation. In 2020, Tulsa voters approved a $48 million reconstruction as part of Vision Tulsa, adding new gates, a stairstep dam design, and a 1,050-foot whitewater flume for recreation south of the pedestrian bridge. The redeveloped lake officially opened during the Labor Day weekend of 2024, attracting nearly 100,000 visitors.

== Recreation and Access ==
As of 2026, Zink Lake serves as a central hub for outdoor recreation, including kayaking, paddleboarding, and riverside trails.

The redesigned dam includes updated safety features and improved water flow management. Ongoing monitoring focuses on water quality, sediment control, and ecological impacts, while officials emphasize safe recreational use.
