= Turkey Mountain Urban Wilderness Area =

Park in Tulsa, Oklahoma

Turkey Mountain

Highest point
- Elevation: 919 ft (280 m)
- Coordinates: 36°04′23″N 95°59′41″W

Geography
- Location within Oklahoma
- Location: Tulsa, Oklahoma

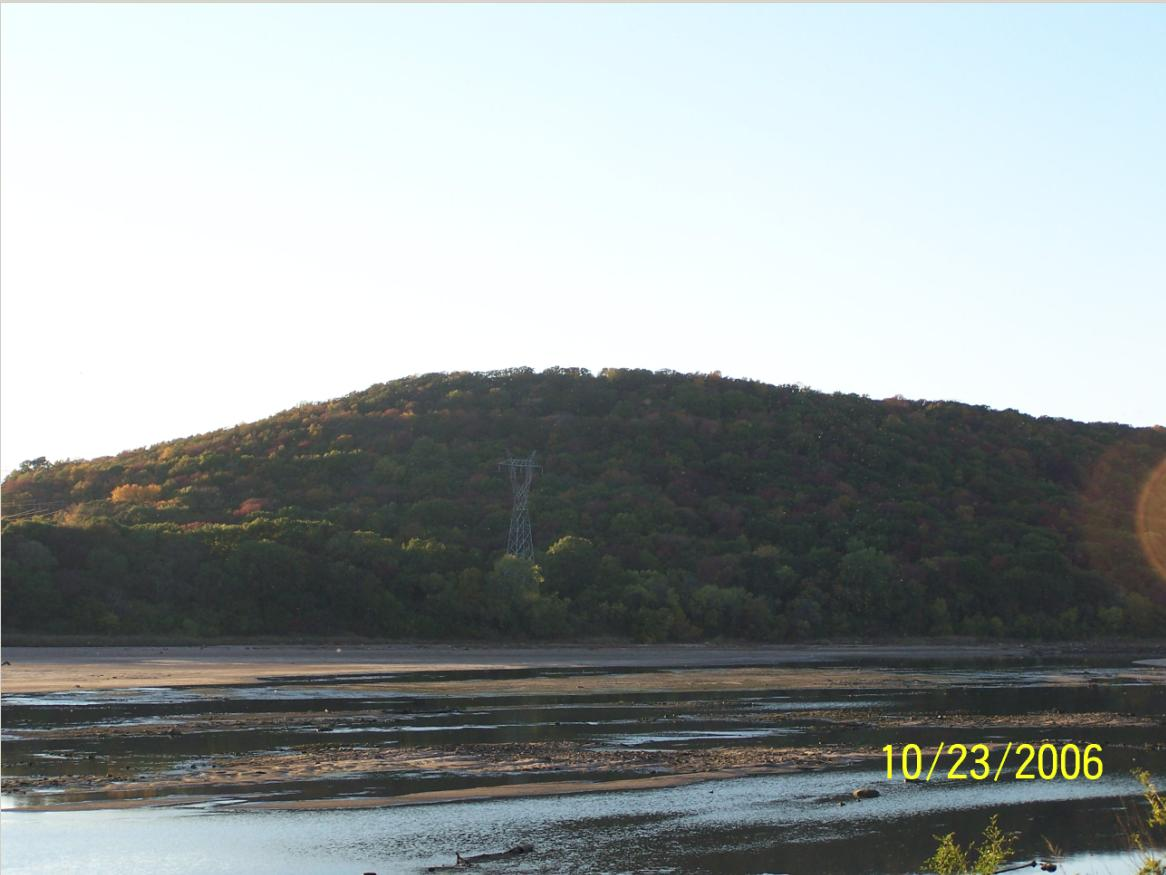
Turkey Mountain as seen over the Arkansas River in October 2006

Turkey Mountain Urban Wilderness Area is an approximately 738-acre (299 ha) wilderness park in Tulsa in the US state of Oklahoma. It is managed by the Tulsa River Parks Authority and open to the public for hiking, mountain biking, and trail running. The main entrance is at 67th Street and Elwood Avenue in West Tulsa.

== Size and location ==
Turkey Mountain is a hill occupying a wide area on the west side of the Arkansas River in Tulsa, Oklahoma. The summit is 300 feet (91 m) above the river below, offering a view of Tulsa. The park stretches between Interstate 44 to 71st Street, and US-75 to the Arkansas River.

The park started in 1978 with 147 acres purchased with Tulsa County, federal, and private funds. By 2023, the park had expanded to about 650 acres. In that year, about 88 additional acres were added, 73 of which were purchased by River Parks with sales tax funding, and 15 coming from private donation. The additional 88 acres are located across a street called Elwood from the core area of the park, and private donation is being utilized to create a safe path to link the properties.

== Trails ==
Turkey Mountain 30 marked trails between 0.25 and 3 miles (0 and 5 km) in length, for running, hiking, or mountain biking as well as over 5 miles (8 km) of unmarked trails. The 25 mile long River Parks paved trail passes through the Turkey Mountain, close to the river, connecting the area to other river side parks in Tulsa.

In June 2016, the National Park Service designated the Turkey Mountain trails as part of the National Recreation Trail system.

The Turkey Mountain Master Plan calls for 40 miles of multiuse trails, of which more than 30 had been completed by January 2024. In addition, a project is underway to link Turkey Mountain with Bales and Lubell parks, which have an additional 9 miles of multiuse trails between them.

== Additional Improvements ==
A 20,000 square foot park maintenance facility is being constructed on land adjacent to Turkey Mountain, on the north side of 71st St. and east of Elwood. Plans call for a new Visitors Center east of Turkey Mountain's lower parking lot off Elwood, and additional parking.

== Claimed petroglyphs ==
Now completely gone, but close to the river there were several markings in the stone, one of which was claimed to be the letters "gwn" (claimed to mean fair or white hair). These were believed by writer Barry Fell to be petroglyphs left by pre-Columbian European travelers. The idea of Pre-Columbian trans-oceanic contact by Europeans, apart from the Vikings in Newfoundland, is considered a fringe theory or pseudoarchaeology. The park itself says the sandstone involved is very soft and vulnerable to erosion which would cause any markings to quickly fade, so at most the carvings were done in the 1920s by oil field workers who were scouring the area for oil.
