= Berryhill, Oklahoma =

Berryhill
- Unincorporated community
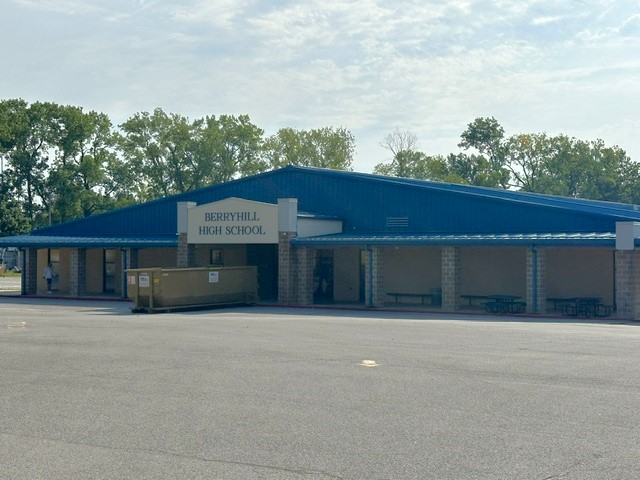
- Berryhill High School, July of 2026

- Location within the state of Oklahoma Berryhill (the United States)
- Coordinates: 36°6′15″N 96°7′5″W
- Country: United States
- State: Oklahoma
- County: Tulsa
- Time zone: UTC-6 (Central (CST))
  - Summer (DST): UTC-5 (CDT)

Berryhill is an unincorporated community in Tulsa County, Oklahoma, United States, west of Tulsa, and is approximately four square miles (10 km^{2}) in area. It is located south of the Arkansas River and north of West 41st Street South, and between South 71st West Avenue and South 47th West Avenue. The creeks tend to flow into Berryhill Creek before emptying into the Arkansas River,

The most recognizable hill in the valley is Victory Hill, located just east and towering over the Berryhill Football Field. This hill is said to have significance to the earliest inhabitants of Berryhill. Cowbell Hill has been the scene of repeated fatal car accidents for travellers on South 49th West Avenue. The most famous hill in Berryhill is Chandler Park. Located in Berryhill and next to Chandler Park was a Superfund clean-up site. The United States Environmental Protection Agency set up monitors to record exposure atop school buildings at Berryhill. The old refinery and the trash-to-energy plant between downtown Tulsa and Berryhill contribute as sources of pollution, although improved technologies promise less destruction to the environment of Berryhill than in the past.

== History ==
The area was originally known as Happy Hollow. Much of the land in Berryhill was allotted to Creek Indian Tom Berryhill. Some time after 1910, Tom Berryhill donated land for the first school and the name Happy Hollow was changed to Berryhill. The one room school house served Berryhill until 1929 when it became a Freewill Baptist Church, the first church in the community. The old, original parts of Berryhill, although containing some affluent members, were mainly working class, blue-collar families with high hopes for their children.

Both economic classes were attracted by the comparatively rural culture of Berryhill as opposed to the urbanization going on in Tulsa, as well as the fact that there was an abundance of manufacturing jobs in nearby West Tulsa.

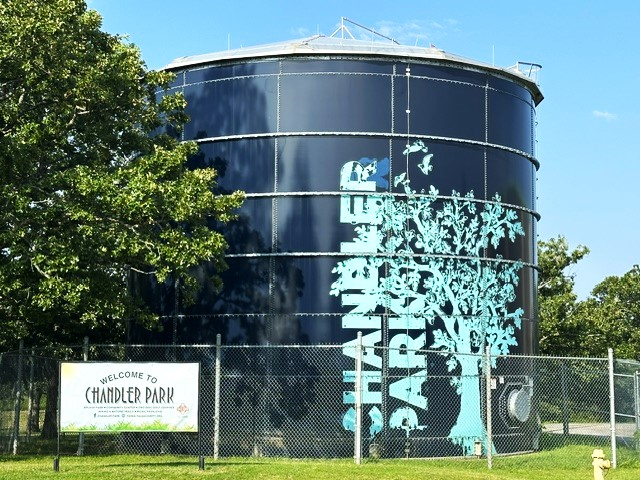
Chandler Park water tank and signage, 7-2026

Berryhill was not able to generate enough mail to establish a post office, and certain laws governing the geography of townships in Oklahoma prevent the community from ever becoming a town. This meant that the independent school district became the focus of the community.

In 1982, the city of Tulsa proposed to extend its city limits to surround Berryhill. However, vigorous opposition by Berryhill residents and some Tulsa officials (e.g., Police Chief Harry Stege and City Engineer Harold Miller) resulted in leaving Berryhill outside the Tulsa line.

The development of the Rolling Oaks area in the 1980s and 1990s, enabled affluent families to enjoy Sand Springs sanitary system, as opposed to the septic system used by most of the residents of Berryhill. Also, many parents sought the more-individualized attention to students the Berryhill school district offered.

Eventually, the increase of well-to-do families on the hills over South 65th W. Avenue led to other developments in Berryhill. Recent developments include an expansion of West 41st Street into four lanes between South 57th W. Avenue to SH-97 in Prattville, Oklahoma (Sand Springs), and construction of several new commercial buildings including a Tulsa Community College campus, National Guard facility, a bank, and a carwash.

Tulsa has started an initiative to annex Berryhill into Tulsa city limits before current laws governing annexation change which will make it more difficult for Tulsa to do in the future.

The creeks tend to flow into Berryhill Creek before emptying into the Arkansas River near the railroad tracks off West 21st Street near South 57th West Avenue, in an area which will soon become part of the Gilcrease Expressway. Most of the homes directly east of South 57th West Avenue and west of South 55th W. Avenue have already been demolished and the first phase, the Gilcrease Expressway Extension, has been finished for several years.

== Schools ==
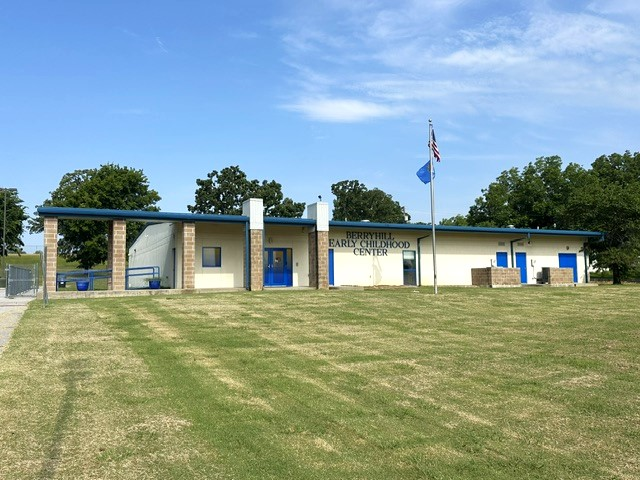
Berryhill Early Childhood Center, 7-2026

Berryhill School District is an independent school district. Classes are offered for students in Pre-Kindergarten, Kindergarten, elementary school, middle school and high school. Student population is nearly 1,150 as of 2004.

Berryhill Public Schools serves grades K-12. Behind the high school is the library. South of the high school is Berryhill Junior High School. Next to the junior high is the C.C. Ogilvie Fieldhouse which features the basketball court for the high school, and the concession where Berryhill High School students have the option of having lunch. Behind the junior high building and the fieldhouse is a building and practice field for the 31 time State and Grand Championship Band, The Brigade. South of the fieldhouse is the wrestling room. An additional athletics facility has been constructed on S. 65th W. Ave. across the street from Berryhill Fire Department's fire station.

The elementary grades are split between Berryhill North Elementary and Berryhill South Elementary.

=== History ===
At one time, the South Elementary building served as both high school and junior high school, and elementary. After the school board built an elementary school, the building served as the high school and junior high school. Later, Berryhill built the high school, and the old building became Berryhill Junior High School for grades 7–8. In 1988, a new junior high was built near the new high school and the building became the Upper Elementary building. In 2004, the north wing of the original build was demolished and a new building was constructed in its place and now the building is called Berryhill South Elementary School.

== Berryhill Fire Protection District ==
The Berryhill Fire Protection District was established at the first directors meeting September 30, 1954. The original board of directors was Waymon Ray, President; Lawrence A. "Buss" Woolridge, secretary; James Sadler, Vice-President, Edward Lee "Bill" Cecil; and Robert Marian Hensley. The original district was the same as Berryhill Public School district. The first truck was a 1941 Peter Pirsch purchased from the City of Siloam Springs Fire Department. On April 26, 1977 the district was made a Title 19 (County) Fire Department by a vote of the people.

In 2006 the district doubled in size by a vote of the people to include the 21st Street corridor (Holly Refinery, BNSF Railyard, AAON, and Magellan Pipeline Services. The fire district purchased land in December 2014 to build a new fire station on 41st Street (in front of Berryhill Baptist Church) with a building to be constructed in 2015. In August 2017 the district consolidated all operations to a new 15,000 square foot 9 bay facility at 5911 W 41st Street. The community received an ISO Property Protection Classification (PPC) 2 (1 is the best) in March 2017 and is protected by 27 volunteers and 7 paid staff.

== Religion ==
Berryhill is a Bible Belt community. Many of the churches in Berryhill are Baptist, and a small few are Catholic. On S. 57th W. Ave. is Most Precious Blood Parish of the Catholic Diocese of Tulsa, an apostolate of the Priestly Fraternity of St. Peter (FSSP). Berryhill Baptist is on West 41st Street. View Acres Baptist church is the voting location for Oklahoma State District 64 and is located on South 65th W. Avenue. The New Home Freewill Baptist church is located across from the South Elementary. Solace Church is located on 41st Street 73rd W. Avenue. Calvary Baptist is located off 65th W. Avenue on 36th Street South.
