= West Tulsa, Tulsa =

Coordinates: 36°08′06″N 96°00′09″W

West Tulsa is a local name given to an area situated in the west section of the city of Tulsa, Oklahoma, United States which includes various communities to the west and south of the Arkansas River. As development between Sand Springs and Tulsa continued in the late 19th through the early 20th centuries, the name "West Tulsa" was used to refer to this area west of Tulsa and north of the Arkansas River. However, many people in Tulsa and those knowing of the history of Tulsa do not include this area near Sand Springs when referring to West Tulsa.

== Layout ==
The southwest quadrant of Tulsa is split into county and city areas, so that the county areas include industrial area enclaves and lands south and west of the city limits. Some communities are within city limits and others are not, including a large section of urban housing and commercial and industrial development around West 23rd street, which is the most developed area of West Tulsa. Generally accepted communities of West Tulsa in city limits are Red Fork, Carbondale, Garden City, and Turkey Mountain. Those not within Tulsa City limits are Berryhill, Marglo, Bowden, and Prattville (though annexed by the city of Sand Springs in 1964). Other communities considered a part of West Tulsa but located in Creek County are Oakhurst, Oakridge, and Allen-Bowden.

The most significant road in West Tulsa is Southwest Boulevard (originally called Quanah Avenue until the middle to late 1950s), which was formerly part of Route 66. Other principal streets in West Tulsa include West 21st street, West 41st street, West 51st street, and the principal avenues are South 65th West avenue, South 57th West avenue, South 49th West avenue, South 33rd West avenue, South Union avenue, and South Elwood avenue.

West Tulsa is also home to the Oaks Country Club, one of Tulsa's three major country clubs; Inverness Village, a large retirement community; and Camp Loughridge, a Christian Summer Camp operated on 186 acres of land in West Tulsa. Goodwill Industries is located in this area, as well as several companies supporting Tulsa's transportation industry adjacent to the BNSF Railway "Cherokee" railyard.

West Tulsa Free Will Baptist Church has been serving the area since 1946. The church offers H2O Teen Ministries for 6th through 12th grades, and CityKids Ministries for pre-kindergarten through 5th grades. Located at the corner of Nogales Avenue and West 23rd Place, West Tulsa Free Will Baptist Church also provides Upward Sports programs for the community. The church is associated with the National Association of Free Will Baptists in Nashville, Tennessee, and Randall University of Moore, Oklahoma.

Two oil refineries operate in West Tulsa. Sunoco's Tulsa refinery opened in 1913, and is located adjacent to I-244 at the Arkansas River. A sale of this refinery to Holly Corp. of Dallas, Texas was announced, with a planned closing date of June 1, 2009. The Sinclair Refinery (built in 1910 by Texaco) is located on Southwest Boulevard. Holly Corporation of Dallas, Texas bought both the former Texaco refinery and the Sunoco refineries in 2009 and announced that it would operate both as a single refinery.

== Education ==
West Tulsa High Schools are Daniel Webster High School and Berryhill High School. Clinton Middle School on West 41st Street and Berryhill Junior High School are separate school districts. Eugene Field Elementary School, Robertson Elementary in Carbondale, Remington Elementary in Mountain Manor, and Park Elementary in Red Fork are in Tulsa city limits. West Tulsa Elementary schools outside city limits are Jane Addams Elementary School on South 65th West Avenue and Berryhill Elementary School on West 31st Street. These schools are south of the Arkansas river. Oklahoma State University Center for Health Sciences, which includes their College of Osteopathic Medicine, is on West 17th Street.

A second amusement park called Sunset Plunge Amusement Park was located North of Walterr-Fuller Addition and just SW of the Holly Refinery along the interabang line in Sec 23 T19N R12E in West Tulsa. It had a swimming pool, dance hall, Rollercoaster (called the Jack Rabbit), and numerous rides. It opened in 1920.

In June 2006, the Southwest Tulsa Main Street Committee had plans to present a request to the city of Tulsa for support of an Urban Main Street program covering Southwest Boulevard from OSU Medical Center to Crystal City. The request is the first step toward getting the area certified as part of the Oklahoma Main Street program, which should help the West Tulsa area economically.

Tulsa's Red Fork area has been selected by the Oklahoma Department of Commerce to be the city's first designated Urban Main Street Community. The Red Fork Main Street encompasses two blocks on either side of Southwest Boulevard extending from the Arkansas River to 49th West Avenue. Being part of the state program provides access to technical support, planning, expertise and resources that help communities preserve historic buildings and make them economically viable. The City Council agreed to a three-year, $150,000 commitment to take part in the program. Matching funds were pledged by numerous individuals and businesses.

== Levee ==
On the left bank of the Arkansas River, the levee extends from river mile 531.0 near Sand Springs, Oklahoma, downstream to river mile 521.4 at Tulsa. On the right bank, the levee extends from near river mile 526.7 downstream to river mile 521.3 and is adjacent to the major portion of the business and residential districts in West Tulsa. Approximately 12.4 miles of levees were constructed prior to February 1938 in accordance with plans contained in HD 308, 74th Congress, 1st Session. Improvements and additions to the levees were initiated in the fall of 1943 and were completed in the spring of 1945.
