= Swan Lake, Tulsa =

- Swan Lake Historic District
- U.S. National Register of Historic Places
- U.S. Historic district
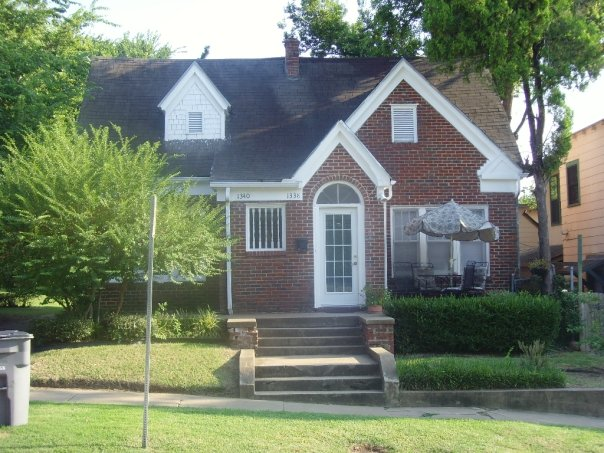
- 1930 Orcutt Duplex in Swan Lake
- Location: Tulsa, OK
- Coordinates: 36°08′08″N 95°58′12″W
- Built: 1910
- Architectural style: Various
- NRHP reference No.: 98000140
- Added to NRHP: February 20, 1998

Swan Lake is a historic district in Tulsa, Oklahoma. Its borders consist of 15th Street to the North, Utica Street to the East, 21st Street to the South, and Peoria Avenue to the west. The District was developed in the early 20th century as a middle-class residential area with single-family homes, some duplexes and apartment buildings. It is still considered a residential area with a high occupancy rate.

The district presently covers about 127 acres (51 ha) and includes 415 contributing resources and 148 non-contributing resources. (Note: A resource (buildings. sites or objects) is considered non-contributing if it meets one or more of the following criteria: was built outside the period of significance; has been physically altered; Swan Lake Historic District's period of significance is considered as 1910 - 1946.) It was the site of an amusement park in the early Twentieth Century, but is now notable for the number and architectural variety of houses and apartment buildings constructed in the 1920s and 1930s. In 2011, the American Planning Association (APA) named Swan Lake as a Top Ten Great Neighborhood.

== History ==
At the beginning of the Twentieth Century, spring-fed Orcutt Lake was the watering hole for a ranch belonging to Colonel Adolphus D. Orcutt, a native of Kentucky and a Civil War veteran. Orcutt moved his family from Kentucky to Indian Territory in 1870, settling in what was then part of the Creek Nation. Colonel Orcutt originally rented the land from an unidentified member of the Creek tribe for the purpose of raising cattle. He created a cattle watering hole from a natural spring on the property. His son, Samuel Augustus ("Gus") Orcutt, also a native of Kentucky, went into the ranching business. Gus married a Creek woman named Annie Hodge in 1890. When the Creek lands were allotted the Orcutts became the owners of 800 acres (320 ha) around the stock pond. In 1908, a group of developers led by Colonel Orcutt's son, purchased 25 acres (100,000 m^{2}) in Orcutt Addition to build a park and an artificial lake. The amusement park, built by the lake in 1909, marked the end of the trolley line by 1910. Other park facilities included an enclosed dance pavilion, a natatorium (swimming pool), an airdrome, and, later, a $7,600 roller-coaster. By 1917, Orcutt Lake Amusement Park had become a residential area and was renamed Swan Lake. In 1917, Gus Orcutt sold his development to Tulsa businessman and developer, E. J. Brennan, who coined the name Swan Lake. Brennan donated the lake itself to the City of Tulsa as a public park in 1917. The amusement park facilities (and the trolley line) are long gone, replaced by imposing mansions during the 1920s, but the lake remains to the present. Property contained within the District was annexed by the City of Tulsa during 1917–18.

Orcutt Lake as it looked in 1904

The central feature of the lake, a large rustic concrete fountain, was rebuilt by the WPA in 1938. The water supply to Swan Lake was cut off during a drought in 1948. Much of the water in the lake evaporated, while the rest became stagnant. The lake was later drained and refilled, but the surrounding infrastructure had deteriorated in the meantime. The drain line collapsed and pests such as mosquitos and rats proliferated. The condition recurred during the 1950s and 1960s. A 1983 city bond issue funded a major renovation campaign that brought the area back; 1986 saw the lake drained again, and by 1987 a $1 million facelift had been completed. The refurbishment even included restocking the lake with desirable wildlife such as Trumpeter swans. The large central concrete fountain fell into disrepair in 2000; however, it was refurbished and returned to operational status in November 2024 after a $2.2 million renovation project funded by the City.

== Description ==
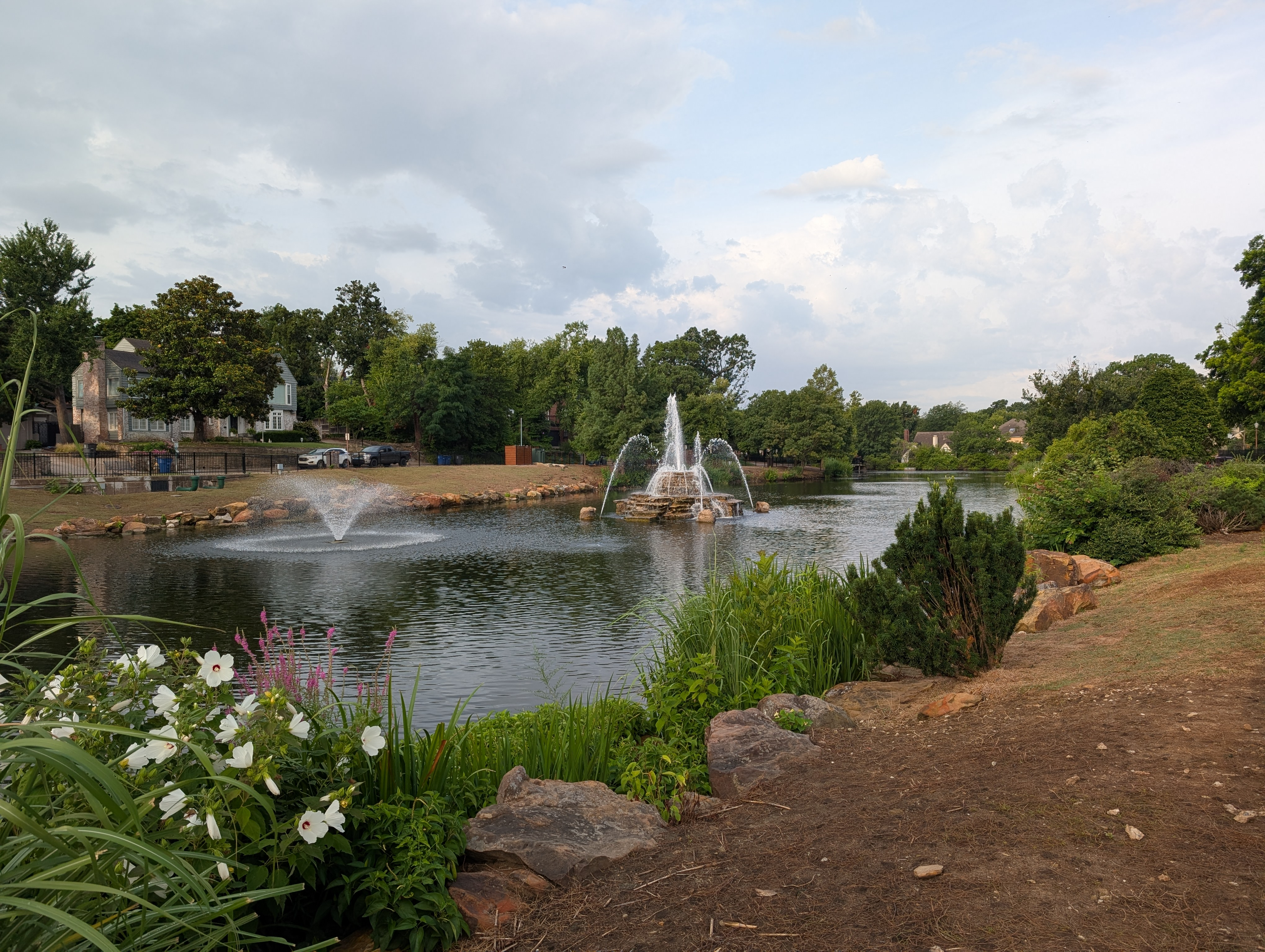
Swan Lake with fountains, Tulsa, OK

Swan Lake is the focal point of the district of the same name. Two-story houses built around the lake from 1919 to the present represent a variety of architectural styles including Spanish, Georgian Revival and vernacular interpretations honoring the swan. The remainder of the neighborhood is similar in scale, containing bungalows, two-story houses, quadruplexes and six-plexes of stone, clapboard and stucco. The Swan Lake area has more two- and three-story, 1920 to 1930 multi-family apartments and duplexes than any other residential area in Tulsa. The district includes the commercial area on 15th Street.

The neighborhood of Swan Lake was designed and laid out in a smaller than normal street grid system. This design identified from the beginning a desire for an enhance focus on pedestrian traffic and an indirect focus on neighborly community interaction. Supporting this idea is the quantity of community organization and community activities that are prevalent year round. Such a community involvement identifies a true connection between the neighborhood and the citizens that call it home.

Noted Tulsa architect, Joseph R. Koberling, Jr. chose to build his own home in the district in 1944. The house at 1543 South Swan Drive is still used as a private residence. Its architectural syle has been described as French Eclectic.

- Organized in 1983, Swan Lake Neighborhood Association launched a successful campaign (1992) to list neighborhood in the National Register of Historic Places (1998)
- Tulsa Parks and Swan Lake Waterfowl Society partner to ensure viability of resident swans and other riparian birds. Society cares for and feeds waterfowl; park staff maintains shore habitat.
- The larger-than-life bronze of a trumpeter swan in-flight located at park entrance.
- "Enchantment," a boy with a swan, relocated from 1934 Chicago World's Fair.

Swan Lake was placed on the National Register of Historic Places on February 20, 1998 under National Register criteria A and C. Its NRIS number is 98000140.

== Great American Place ==
The United States has many historic neighborhoods across the country, each significant in their own way to their own communities. Some communities have been identified as “Great Places in America: Neighborhoods” by the American Planning Association (APA). The American Planning Association is an independent, not-for-profit organization that supports and advocates community planning through educational and citizen empowerment. In 2011, the APA designated the Swan Lake neighborhood as one of ten "Great Places in America: Neighborhoods." According to the APA, the program recognizes places with a strong sense of place, cultural and historical significance, community involvement, and a vision for the future.

== Marquette School ==
According to the Tulsa Preservation Commission, Marquette School, the parish school for Christ the King Catholic Church, is a contributing resource for the Swan Lake Historical District. The school is at 1519 South Quincy Avenue.

== Amenities not in the District ==
There are some shopping areas along the streets that border the District (especially 15th Street and Peoria Avenue), they are rather limited in scope. Utica Square, located at 21st Street and Utica Avenue is the largest general shopping area close to the District. The St. John's medical complex is across Utica on the east side of the District.

== Additional sources ==
- https://npgallery.nps.gov/NRHP/GetAsset/NRHP/98000140_text NRHP Registration form, "Swan Lake Historic District."] January 12, 1997. Retrieved June 6, 2015.
