= Alsuma, Oklahoma =

Alsuma, Oklahoma Welcome (1905), Trovillion or Troxillion (1926)
- Ghost town
- Location within Oklahoma
- Coordinates: 36°05′42″N 95°51′48″W
- Country: United States
- State: Oklahoma
- County: Tulsa County
- Established: 1906
- Elevation: 659 ft (201 m)
- Time zone: CST
- Area code: 918

Alsuma was a rural community between Tulsa and Broken Arrow in Tulsa County, Oklahoma, United States. Its post office opened in 1905, and was named Welcome, but was renamed Alsuma in 1906. Another version states that the town was named for John Alsuma, a local merchant. According to a long-time resident, the town was renamed for three women: Alice, Susan and Mabel. Legend has it that a squabble among the three town leaders about an appropriate name was settled in a face saving way. Their wives were named Alice, Susie and Mary. It was suggested that the first two letters of each woman's name be combined. The community covered as much as 165 acres (67 ha) and held a population of 75 families. The post office discontinued service in 1926. It is now considered a ghost town. The name is still used locally in referring to a specific area of southeast Tulsa.

The Missouri, Kansas and Texas Railroad (locally known as MKT or Katy) ran through Alsuma and built a station there in 1909. The railroad closed that station in 1940, but operated another station there from 1943 until it was closed in 1971. The railroad renamed the station either Trovillion or Troxillion in 1926, but the sign was repeatedly stolen until the company restored the Alsuma signage. Some early newspapers characterized Alsuma as one of Oklahoma's "black towns". However, former residents have said that some white families also lived there during the time of racial segregation. The railroad divided the community into separate white and black sections. Alsuma had its own school for black children, but the white children went to Union High School, a substantially superior facility. After segregation was outlawed, the black children all transferred to the Union School and the Alsuma school closed permanently.

The Alsuma area seemed to be an attractive locale for an airfield, in the early days of flying. After Duncan A. McIntyre closed his McIntyre Airport, his company merged with that of R. F. Garland, who owned Garland Airport at 51st and Sheridan Road in Tulsa County. The merger occurred in October 1931. The facility was later renamed Garland-Clevenger Airport, and by 1934 it was known as Tulsa Commercial Airport. The airport moved a short distance to the southwest, but still in the vicinity of Alsuma, by 1937. The new facility still was rudimentary by modern standards. Built on a 160 acres (65 ha) tract, it had a sod (unpaved) runway and two hangars. Oilman Walter Brown bought the facility in 1951, renamed it Brown's Air Service and soon began to upgrade it. He added hangars, paved runways and a combination office/restaurant building. Brown Airport continued for more than a decade. By 1964, it was closed and the property turned into a housing development. Tulsa annexed Alsuma in 1966. The city did not extend city services to that area for several years, and did not permit new construction in the area during that time. Residents were even forbidden to build new septic tanks. Tulsa proposed to redevelop the area as an industrial park in 1969, under the aegis of Urban Renewal, and rezoned the entire area for industrial use. It finally completed extending the sewer and water systems to Alsuma in 1971. Today, Alsuma is regarded as the CNG Capital of the World. Several businesses in the Alsuma area of Tulsa provide CNG expertise and equipment globally and were specifically responsible for the adoption of CNG in India and parts of Africa.

Few physical traces of Alsuma still exist inside the Tulsa city limits, on 51 Street between Mingo Road and the Mingo Valley Expressway. Alsuma had its own park, where both black and white children played during the era of segregation. This was prohibited by law in the segregated Tulsa city parks. The Tulsa Park and Recreation Department still lists Alsuma Park at 9801 E. 51st Street as a recreation area, but it is used primarily for storm water retention. There are soccer fields in the pond area, but all playground equipment has disappeared. There are still some residences remaining, but officially Alsuma is regarded as a ghost town.
