= Gathering Place (Tulsa park) =

Public park in Tulsa, Oklahoma

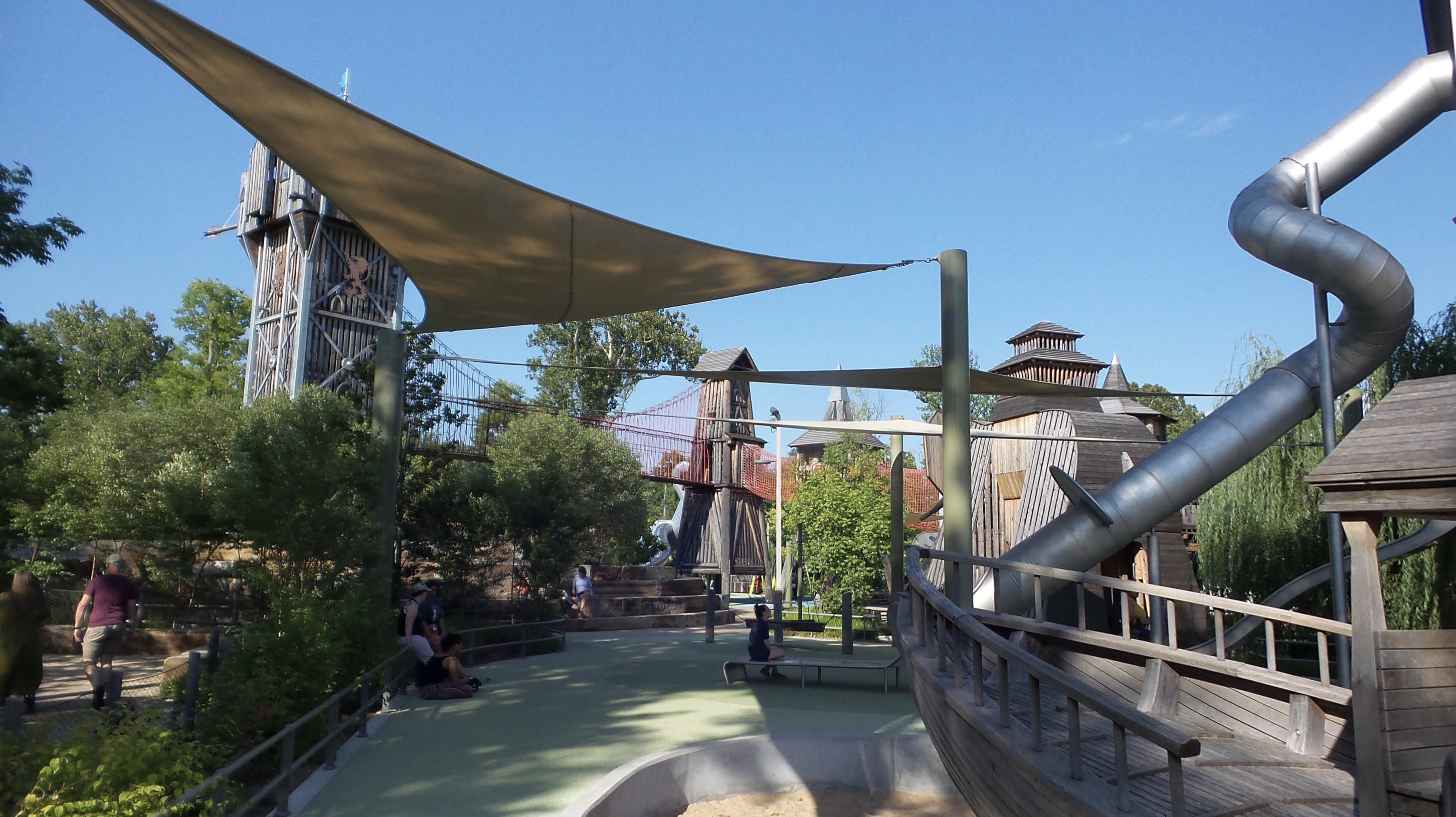
- The Gathering Place in 2020
- Interactive map of Gathering Place
- Location: Tulsa, Oklahoma, United States
- Coordinates: 36°07′27″N 95°59′05″W
- Area: 66.5 acres (26.9 ha)
- Created: September 8, 2018
- Owner: Tulsa River Parks Authority
- Open: Year round
- Status: operating
- Website: www.gatheringplace.org

Gathering Place is a 66.5 acres (26.9 ha) park along the Arkansas River in Tulsa, Oklahoma. Created by the George Kaiser Family Foundation, and designed by landscape architect Michael Van Valkenburgh, the park was established September 8, 2018. It is open to the public free of charge. At $465 million, Gathering Place is the largest private gift to a community park in U.S. history.

== History ==
The park sits on land originally owned by the Muscogee Nation. In the early 1900s the Muscogee Reservation was allotted to tribal members and the land that would become the Gathering Place was allotted to Tuckabache, a Muscogee medicine man, and Joe Hamilton Tiger, a Muscogee Freedmen. The land was later sold to developers after Oklahoma statehood.

=== Plans for a park ===
A vision of the George Kaiser Family Foundation, Gathering Place was designed to be a vibrant and inclusive space, where diverse communities could come together to explore, learn and play. After years of planning, donations, and input from the community, construction began on the park in 2014.

The project took several years to complete. Crossland Construction Company managed the build.

Mack Scogin Merrill Elam architects designed the three major buildings at Gathering Place: Williams Lodge, ONEOK Boathouse and the restroom cabana. Each building embraces the park landscape and in a combination of strategies that incorporate Oklahoma's natural materials.

Michael Van Valkenburgh Associates designed the park to be a nature-inspired retreat within a city environment.

Gathering Place opened to the public on September 8, 2018. According to the Tulsa World, Gathering Place officials had planned for the facility to attract a million visitors per year. The actual attendance for the first year was over 3 million people. The two-day grand opening attracted more than 55,000 visitors.

== Awards ==
In 2019, Gathering Place made Time magazine's list of the World's 100 Greatest Places of 2019, National Geographic's list of 12 Mind-Bending Playgrounds Around the World, and the American Planning Association's list of six great public spaces in America.

== Attractions ==
Gathering Place offers a wide variety of attractions for guests to explore free of charge, including 5 acres (2.0 ha) Chapman Adventure Playground, Williams Lodge, ONEOK Boathouse, QuikTrip Great Lawn, Energy Transfer Sports Courts, a BMX pump track and skate park, Peggy's Pond, as well as numerous gardens, pathways, and trails.

== Discovery Lab ==
Construction on the Discovery Lab began in February 2020. The 50,000 square foot Discovery Lab main building was designed to be a hands-on museum that would stimulate young children's interests in science and technology topics. The new museum replaces a much smaller facility that opened in the Owen Park Recreation Center in May 2013. The Owen Park Discovery Lab closed in 2021. In addition to interactive exhibits, it would contain classrooms, a café, grand plaza and 300-seat amphitheater. A special parking lot was constructed just south of the building as a convenience for visitors. It opened on January 24, 2022.

== "The Gateway" project ==
City officials announced that they would begin construction of a new pedestrian bridge across the Arkansas River as soon as possible after the Phase I opening. Michael Van Valkenburgh Associates won a design contest to implement the project, designated at the time as "The Gateway". Tulsa River Parks Authority said that the project was estimated to be completed three years after construction began, and cost the city $24.4 million.

The project replaces the 1904 Midland Valley Railroad bridge, which had been acquired by the city seventy years later and turned it into a pedestrian bridge. That bridge was inspected and designated as "structurally deficient". Demolition started in June 2021 and was expected to take five to seven weeks to complete, given that the bridge had been taken down column-by-column and section-by-section. The newly constructed Williams Crossing pedestrian bridge was opened over Labor Day weekend in 2024. In related work, the city spent approximately $50 million to overhaul the adjacent Zink Dam in the Arkansas River. The dam, with an adjoining white water flume for recreation, also opened over Labor Day weekend in 2024.

== Effects of 2019 Arkansas River flooding ==
The unusually heavy rains along the Arkansas River caused flooding, especially after it forced major releases from Keystone Dam. This raised the water level downstream above flood stage in many areas and threatened to damage the new Gathering Place, which had opened in the preceding fall, and had to close for a week, until the flood had begun to subside. Gathering Place authorities began to assess the damage and plan repairs.

The east bank of the river experienced relatively light damage, with water covering two of the five sports courts south of 31st Street. After hosing off mud and debris, inspectors found no significant damage to the playing surfaces. However, the flood caused some washouts along the East Bank Trail. At 58th Street and Riverside Drive, it washed away a light stanchion. Matt Meyer, executive director of the Tulsa River Parks Authority, told the press that the washout showed a need to install cable-concrete type bank reinforcement. He noted that a similar project the city had done two years earlier had cost about $1,000 per linear foot.
