= List of Art Deco architecture in Oklahoma =

This is a list of buildings that are examples of the Art Deco architectural style in Oklahoma, United States.

== Ardmore ==
- Ardmore Municipal Auditorium, Ardmore, 1943
- Hardy Murphy Coliseum, Ardmore, 1943
- Tivoli Theatre, Ardmore, 1915 and 1935
- YWCA, Ardmore, 1938

== Clinton ==
- Clinton Armory, Clinton, 1937
- Fire Station, Clinton, 1930s
- McLain Rogers Park, Clinton, 1934

== Enid ==
- 102 Independence, Enid, 1938
- 113 North. Grand, Enid, 1940
- 115 North Grand, Enid, 1940
- 323 Broadway, Enid, 1938
- Arcadia Theatre, 226 West Randolph Avenue, Enid, 1931
- Broadway Tower, Enid, 1931
- Cherokee Theatre (now retail), Enid, 1928
- Enid Armory, Enid, 1936
- Eugene S. Briggs Auditorium, Enid, 1957
- Garfield County Courthouse, Enid, 1896 and 1930
- Taft Elementary School, Enid, 1937
- Triangle Business Center (former Bass Building), Enid, 1930
- Woolworth's, Enid, 1910 and 1921

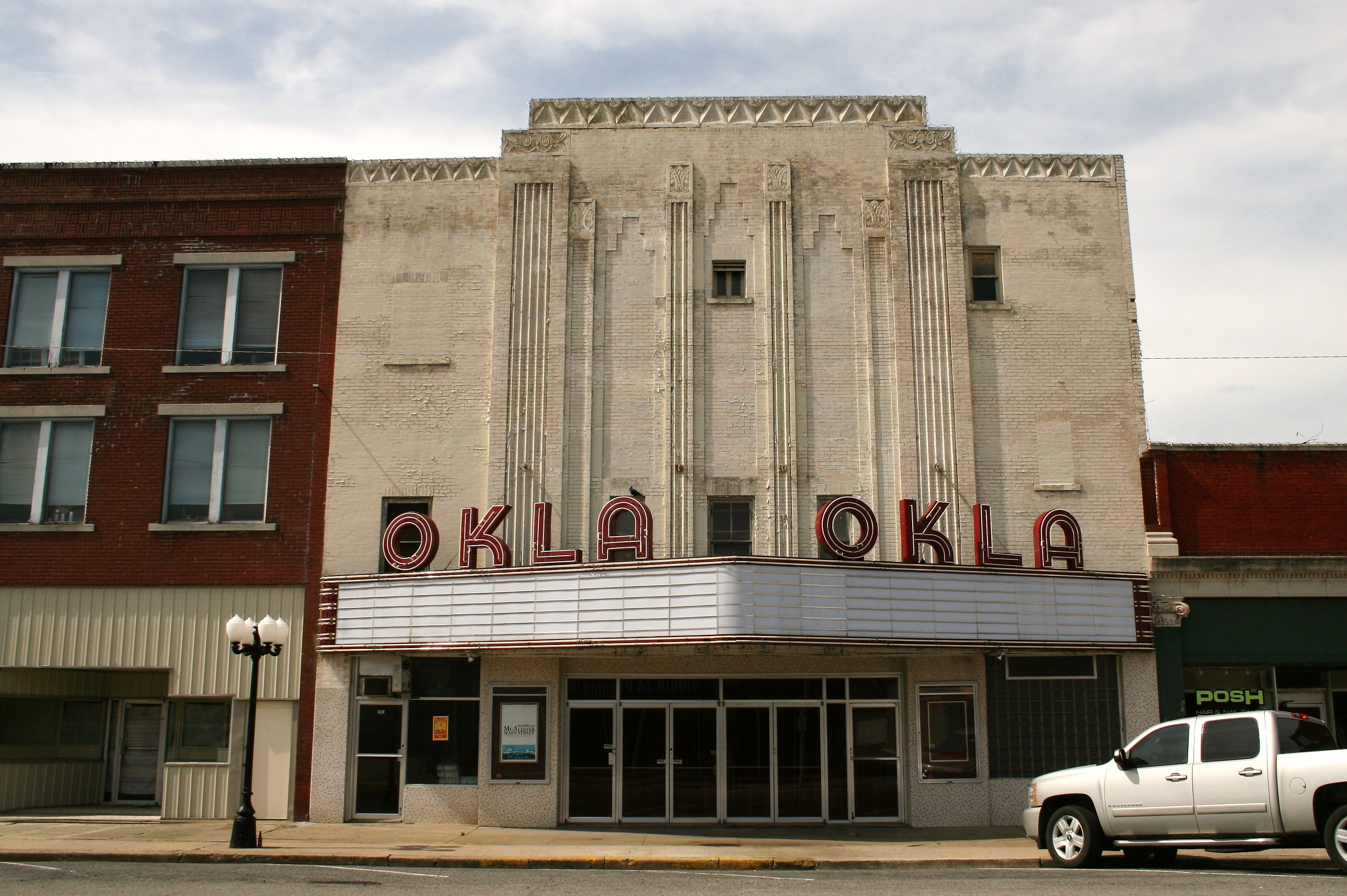
OKLA Theatre, McAlester

== McAlester ==
- 110–114 East Choctaw (former Woolworth's), McAlester
- International Temple, Supreme Assembly, Order of the Rainbow for Girls, McAlester, 1951
- McAlester Armory, McAlester, 1936
- McAlester Scottish Rite Temple, McAlester, 1907 and 1930
- OKLA Theater, McAlester, 1931 and 1948

== Muskogee ==
- 304 East Callahan, Muskogee, 1925
- 540 West Court (former Chrysler–DeSoto Dealership), Muskogee, 1948
- Fire Station No. 3, Muskogee, 1940s
- Fire Station No. 4, Muskogee, 1940s
- Roxy Theatre, Muskogee, 1948

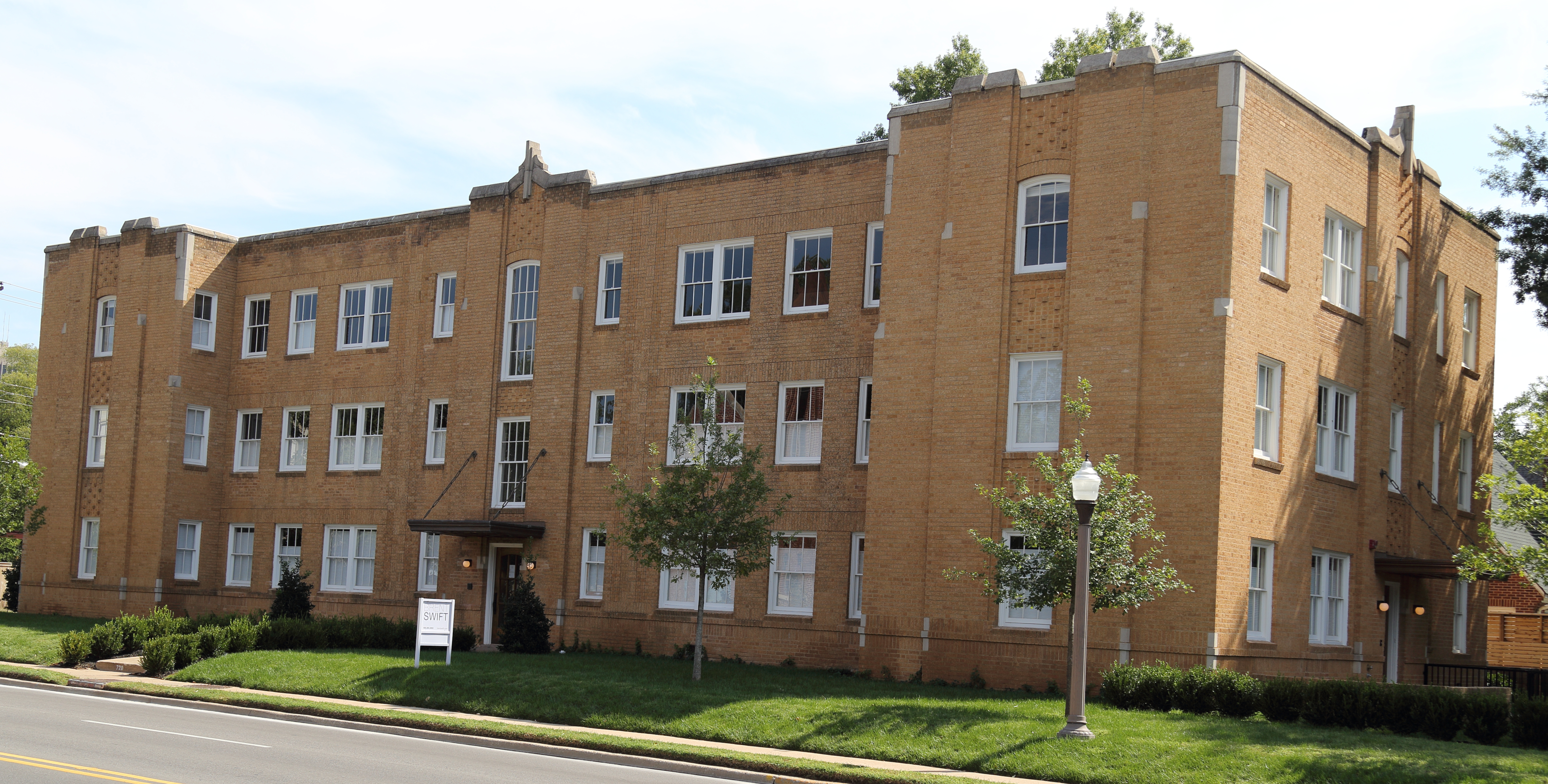
Logan Apartments, Norman

== Norman ==
- 301–302 South Porter, Norman, 1930
- 747 Asp (former cleaner's), Norman, 1930
- Boomer Theater, Norman, 1947
- Cleveland County Courthouse, Norman, 1940
- Corner Thomas Garage (now A-1 Automotive), Norman, 1940s
- Hiland Dairy, Norman, 1940s
- Logan Apartments, Norman
- University Theatre, Norman, 1930
- Varsity Theatre (now retail), Norman

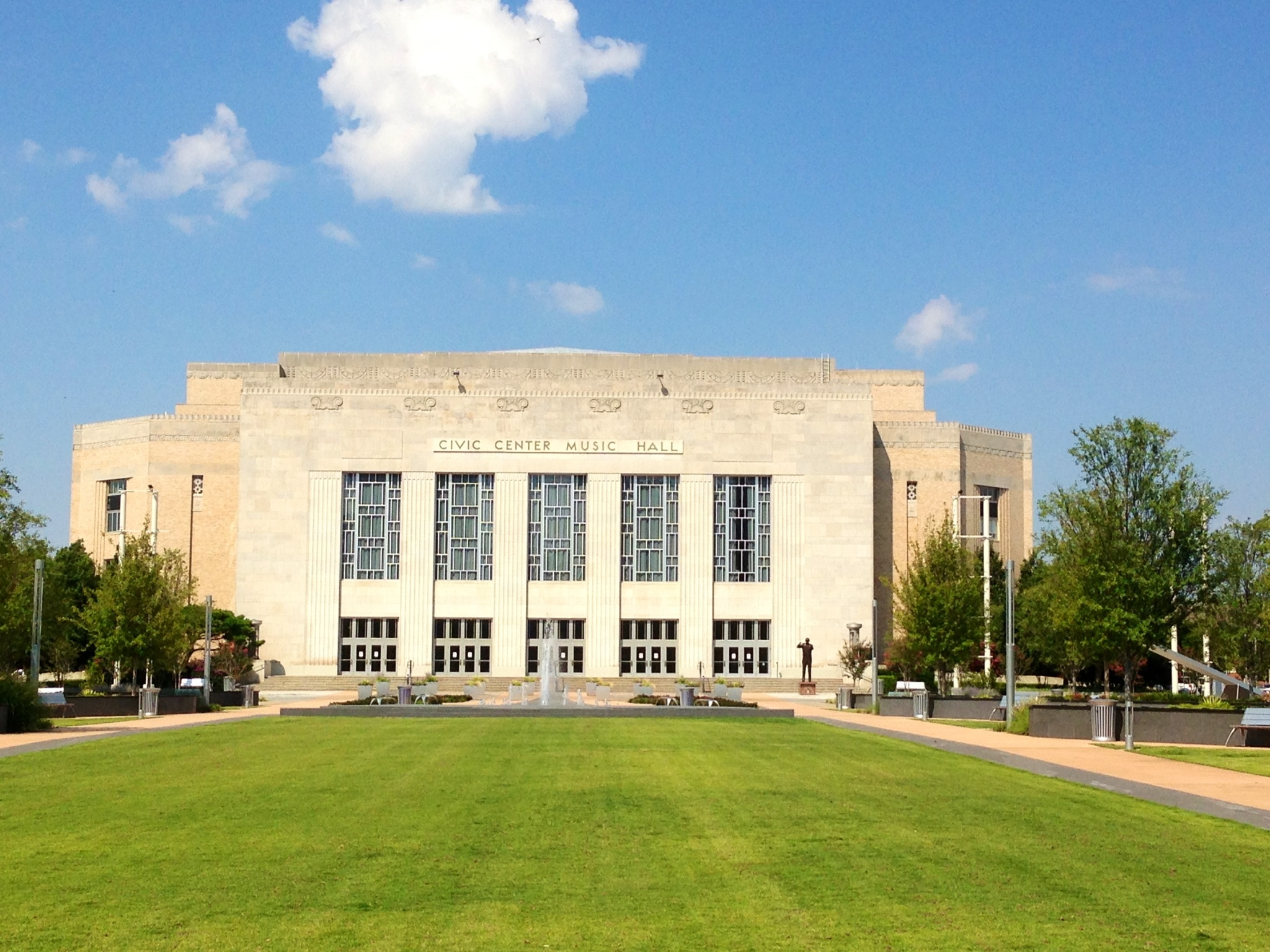
Civic Center Music Hall, Oklahoma City

== Oklahoma City ==
- 100 Park Avenue Building, Oklahoma City, 1923
- Agnew Theater, Oklahoma City, 1947
- Borden's Dairy Building, Oklahoma City, 1947
- Cain's Coffee Building, Oklahoma City, 1919
- Century Building, Oklahoma City
- Cheever's Flowers (now Cheever's Cafe), Oklahoma City, 1935
- City Place Tower, Oklahoma City, 1931
- Civic Center Music Hall, Oklahoma City, 1937
- Doctors Building, Oklahoma City, 1948
- Edmond Armory, Edmond, 1937
- First National Center, Oklahoma City, 1931
- Jewel Theater, Oklahoma City, 1931
- Lawyers Title Building, Oklahoma City, 1930
- Lyric at the Plaza Theater, Oklahoma City, 1935
- May Theatre, Oklahoma City, 1946
- Norton–Johnson Buick Company, Oklahoma City, 1930
- Nuway Laundry & Cleaners, Oklahoma City, 1940s
- Oklahoma County Courthouse, Oklahoma City, 1937
- Oklahoma Opry, Oklahoma City, 1946
- Raylyn Taylor Salon, Oklahoma City
- Santa Fe Depot, Oklahoma City, 1934
- Sewage Treatment Plant, Oklahoma City
- Taft Middle School, Oklahoma City, 1931
- United States Post Office, Courthouse, and Federal Office Building, Oklahoma City, 1912
- Will Rogers Theater Events Center, Oklahoma City, 1946

== Shawnee ==
- Auditorium, Shawnee
- Hornbeck Theatre, Shawnee, 1947
- Pottawatomie County Courthouse, Shawnee, 1934

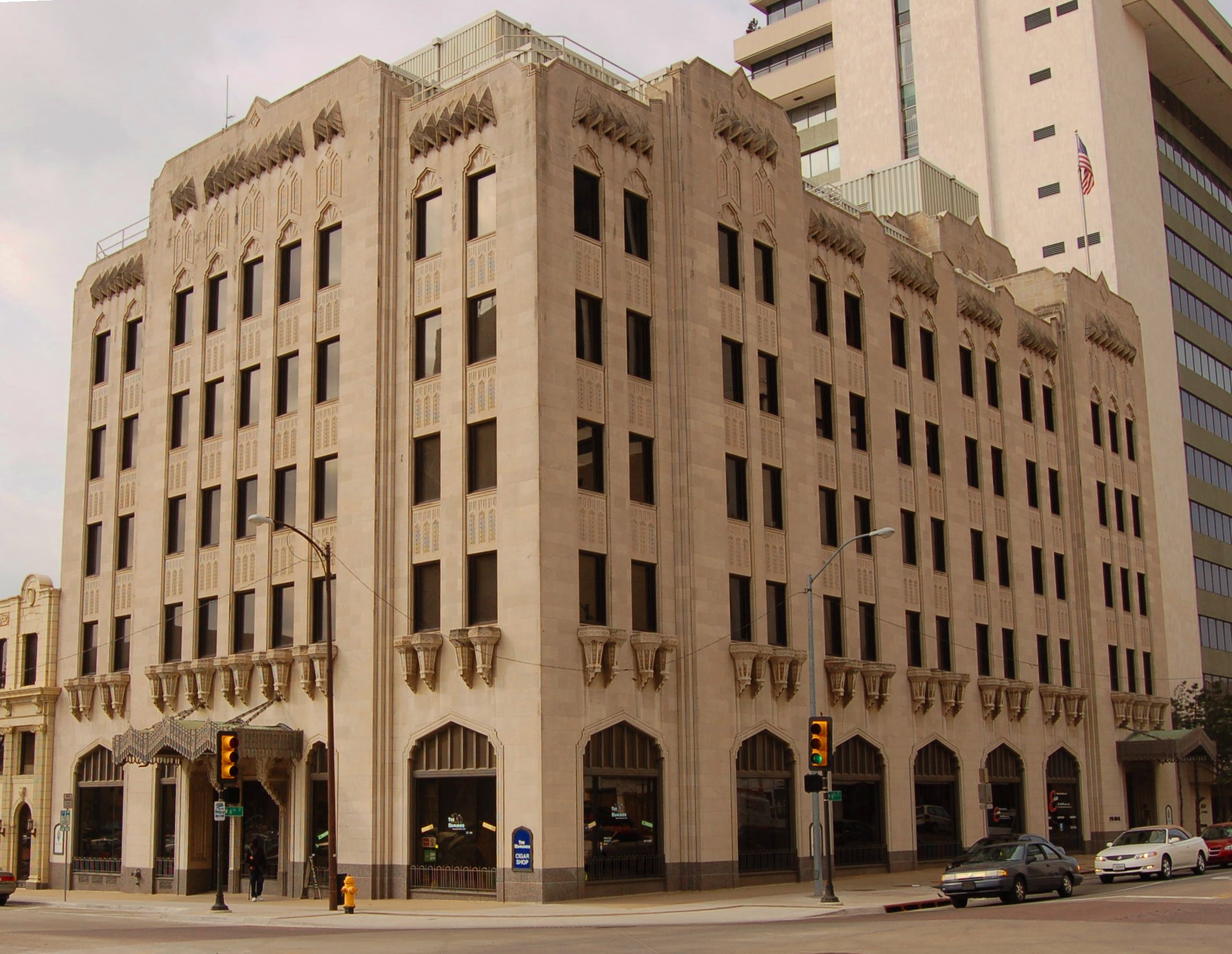
Art Deco Lofts and Apartments, Tulsa

== Tulsa ==
- Adah Robinson Residence, Tulsa, 1929
- Art Deco Lofts and Apartments, Tulsa, 1929
- Boston Avenue Methodist Church, Tulsa, 1929
- Boulder on the Park, Tulsa, 1923
- Brady Theater, Tulsa, 1910
- Central High School, Tulsa, 1925
- Christ the King Church, Tulsa, 1928
- Cities Service Station #8, Tulsa, 1940
- City Veterinary Hospital, Tulsa, 1942
- Continental Supply Company Building, Tulsa, 1921
- Day Building (now Nelson's Buffeteria), Tulsa, 1926
- 11th Street Bridge over the Arkansas River, Tulsa, 1916-17, Modified 1929
- Expo Square Pavilion, Tulsa, 1932
- Fawcett Building, Tulsa, 1926
- Fire Station No. 13, Tulsa, 1931
- Fleeger Residence, Tulsa, 1937
- Guaranty Laundry, Tulsa, 1928
- Hawks Ice Cream, Tulsa, 1948
- Jesse D. Davis Residence, Tulsa, 1936
- John Duncan Forsyth Residence, Tulsa, 1937
- KVOO-TV Broadcast Facility, Tulsa, 1954
- Marquette School, Tulsa, 1932
- Mayo Motor Inn, Tulsa, 1950
- McGay Residence, Tulsa, 1936
- Merchant's Exhibit Building, Tulsa State Fairgrounds, Tulsa, 1930
- Metropolitan Tulsa Transit Authority Transfer Center, Tulsa, 1999
- Midwest Equitable Meter, Tulsa, 1929
- Midwest Marble and Tile Building, Tulsa, 1945
- Milady's Cleaners, Tulsa, 1930
- National Guard Armory, Tulsa, 1942
- National Supply Company (now U-Haul), Tulsa, 1930
- Oaklawn Cemetery Entrance Gates, Tulsa, 1930
- Oklahoma Department of Transportation, Tulsa, 1940
- Oklahoma Natural Gas Company Building, Tulsa, 1925
- Page Warehouse, Tulsa, 1927
- Petroleum Building, Tulsa, 1921
- Philcade Building, Tulsa, 1931
- Philtower Building, Tulsa, 1928
- Phoenix Cleaners, Tulsa, 1937
- Pythian Building, Tulsa, 1931
- Riverside Studios, Tulsa, 1929
- Service Pipeline Building (former ARCO Building), Tulsa, 1949
- Sherman Residence, Tulsa, 1930s
- Southwestern Bell Main Dial Building, Tulsa, 1924
- Tulsa Club Building, Tulsa, 1927
- Tulsa Fire Alarm Building, Tulsa, 1934
- Tulsa Monument Company, Tulsa, 1936
- Tulsa SPCA, Tulsa, 1931
- Tulsa State Fairgrounds Pavilion, Tulsa, 1932
- Tulsa Union Depot, Tulsa, 1931
- Ungerman Residence, Tulsa, 1941
- Warehouse Market, Tulsa, 1930
- Webster High School, Tulsa, 1938
- Westhope, Tulsa, 1929
- Whentoff Residence, Tulsa, 1935
- Will Rogers High School, Tulsa, 1939

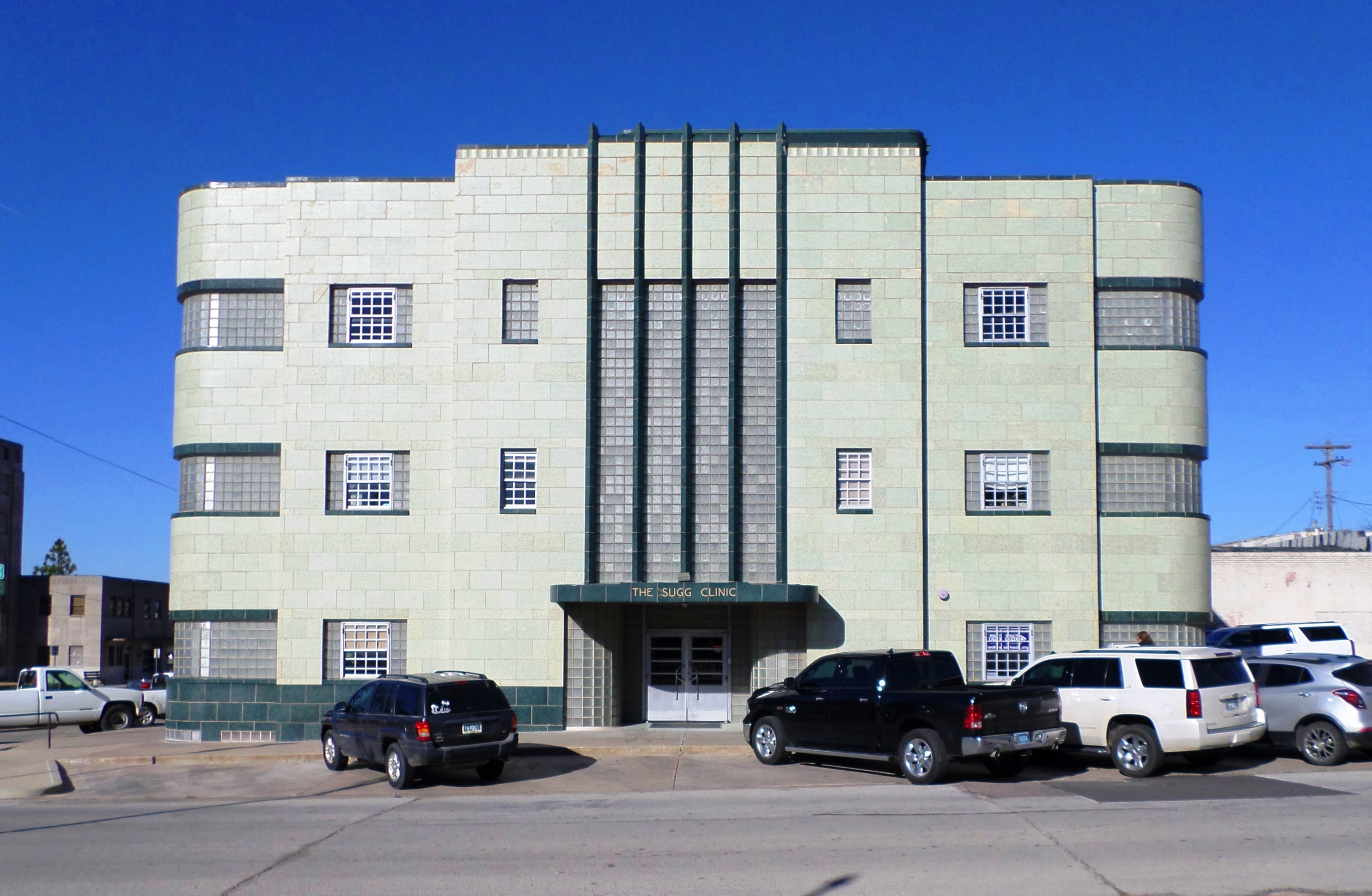
Sugg Clinic, Ada

== Other cities ==
- Adair County Courthouse, Stilwell, 1930
- Allred Theatre, Pryor Creek, 1914 and 1942
- Anadarko Armory, Anadarko, 1937
- Armory, Cherokee
- Atoka Armory, Atoka, 1936
- Attucks School, Vinita, 1917
- Avant's Cities Service Station, El Reno, 1933
- Beard Motor Company, Bristol, 1947 and 1953
- Bristow Firestone Service Station, Bristow, 1929
- Campus Theatre, Stillwater, 1939
- Canute Service Station, Canute, 1939
- Central Fire Station, Ada
- City Hall, Vinita
- Claremore Auto Dealership, Claremore, 1930
- Clayton High School Auditorium, Clayton, 1936
- Bartlesville High School, Bartlesville, 1939
- Grady County Courthouse, Chickasha, 1935
- Gymnasium, Hennessey, 1941
- Gymnasium, Pernell, 1941
- Haskell County Courthouse, Stigler, 1931
- Healdtown Armory, Healdtown, 1936
- Holdenville Armory, Holdenville, 1936
- Hominy Armory, Hominy, 1937
- Hugo Armory, Hugo, 1936
- Jefferson County Courthouse, Waurika, 1931
- Kerr-Mac Service Station, Pauls Valley
- Leachman Theatre (now a furniture showroom), Stillwater, 1948
- Long Theatre, Keyes, 1947
- Masonic Temple, Anadarko
- Memorial Park Swimming Pool, Blackwell, 1940s
- Minco Armory, Minco, 1936
- Municipal Building, Fairview
- Okmulgee Armory, Okmulgee, 1937
- Page Memorial Library, Sand Springs, 1930
- Pawnee County Courthouse, Pawnee, 1932
- Pensacola Dam, between Disney and Langley, 1940
- Poncan Theatre, Ponca City, 1927
- Rialto Theatre, Alva, 1949
- Roff Armory, Roff, 1937
- Sallisaw High School, Sallisaw, 1939
- Sayre Champlin Service Station, Sayre, 1934
- Softener & Filter Unit, El Reno, 1930s or 1940s
- Southwestern Bell Telephone Building, Stroud, 1929
- Sulphur Armory, Sulphur, 1937
- Tahlequah Armory, Tahlequah, 1937
- Telephone Building, Waynoka
- United States Post Office Coalgate, Coalgate, 1940
- United States Post Office Hollis, Hollis, 1939
- United States Post Office Nowata, Nowata, 1938
- Wagoner Armory, Wagoner, 1938
- Warren Theatre, Broken Arrow
- Washita County Jail, Cordell
- Washita Theatre, Chickasha, 1941
- Weatherford Armory, Weatherford, 1937
- Westland Theatre, Elk City, 1950

== See also ==
- List of Art Deco architecture
- List of Art Deco architecture in the United States
