= National Register of Historic Places listings in Washita County, Oklahoma =

Location of Washita County in Oklahoma

This is a list of the National Register of Historic Places listings in Washita County, Oklahoma.

This is intended to be a complete list of the properties and districts on the National Register of Historic Places in Washita County, Oklahoma, United States. The locations of National Register properties and districts for which the latitude and longitude coordinates are included below, may be seen in a map.

There are 6 properties and districts listed on the National Register in the county, including 1 National Historic Landmark.

This National Park Service list is complete through NPS recent listings posted September 26, 2025.

== Current listings ==
	Name on the Register	Image	Date listed	Location	City or town	Description
1	Canute Service Station	Canute Service Station	February 9, 1995 (#94001611)	Southwestern corner of the junction of Main St. and the former U.S. Route 66; 35°25′18″N 99°16′49″W	Canute	
2	Cedar Creek District		May 29, 1975 (#75001577)	Address Restricted	Carnegie	
3	Cordell Carnegie Public Library	Cordell Carnegie Public Library	November 13, 1989 (#89001966)	105 E. 1st St. 35°17′33″N 98°59′22″W	New Cordell	
4	McLemore Site		October 15, 1966 (#66000636)	Address Restricted	Colony	
5	New Cordell Courthouse Square Historic District	New Cordell Courthouse Square Historic District	January 7, 1999 (#98001592)	roughly bounded by Temple, E. 2nd, Glenn English, and E. Clay Sts. 35°17′30″N 98°59′22″W	New Cordell	
6	Washita County Courthouse	Washita County Courthouse	August 24, 1984 (#84003452)	Courthouse Square; 35°17′27″N 98°59′22″W	New Cordell	

== Former listing ==
	Name on the Register	Image	Date listed	Date removed	Location	City or town	Description
1	Seger Indian Training School		August 5, 1971 (#71001080)	1973	Eastern edge of Colony; 35°20′41″N 98°40′11″W	Colony	Destroyed by fire under mysterious circumstances.

== See also ==
- List of National Historic Landmarks in Oklahoma
- National Register of Historic Places listings in Oklahoma
