= Cordell Carnegie Public Library =

- U.S. National Register of Historic Places
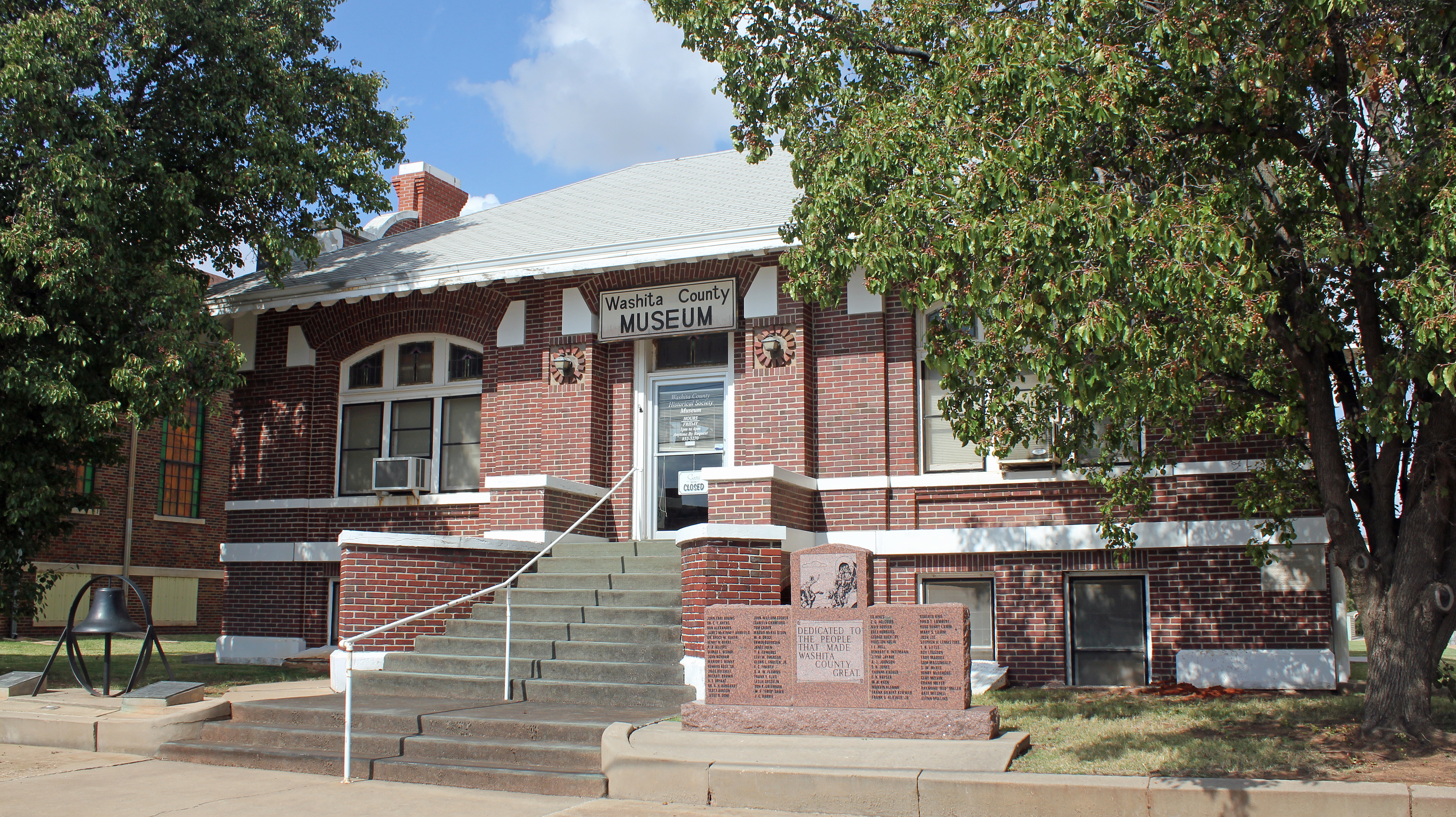
- Former library, now the Washita County Historical Museum, in 2015.

- Location within Oklahoma Location within the United States
- Location: 105 E. First St., Cordell, Oklahoma
- Coordinates: 35°17′33″N 98°59′22″W
- Area: less than one acre
- Built: 1911
- Built by: Bass, D.C.
- Architect: Crowell, A.A.
- Architectural style: Mission Revival, Spanish Colonial Revival
- NRHP reference No.: 89001966
- Added to NRHP: November 13, 1989

The Cordell Carnegie Public Library is a historic Carnegie library located at 105 E. First St. in New Cordell, Oklahoma. The library was built in 1911 through a $10,000 grant from the Carnegie foundation; New Cordell's Commercial Club, which had opened a reading room the previous year, solicited the grant. Architect A. A. Crowell designed the library in the Mission Revival style; several of its elements reflect the emerging Spanish Colonial Revival style. The building's curved parapet walls, exposed rafters, and original red tile roof are all characteristic Mission Revival elements; its segmental arches, sunburst moldings, and ornamental ironwork resemble Spanish Colonial Revival work. The library was the only one in Washita County until the 1960s; it also served as a community center and was regularly used by local schools. In 1982, a new library opened in New Cordell, and the Carnegie Library building became the Washita County Historical Museum.

== History ==
The Cordell Commercial Club established a Library Committee in early spring of 1910. with I. M. Brill, as chairman of the committee. The committee's assignment was to establish a public library by collecting books and obtaining a grant from the Carnegie Foundation. The committee had built up a collection of 700 books by April 1910, through donations or purchases. By June, the Commercial Club had found sufficient space to open a reading room. In the fall of 1910, the Cordell City Council passed a 2-mill tax, which was earmarked for a library operating fund, a prerequisite for application for a Carnegie grant. (Note: The Oklahoma Territorial Legislature had passed an act in 1903 that authorized cities with a population of 5,000 persons or more to levy a property tax of 2 mills per thousand dollars of assessed valuation to fund library operations.) The grant for up to $10,000 was approved in January 1911. Construction bids were solicited. On June 8, a contract for $7,967 was awarded to the successful bidder, D. C. Bass Company, of Enid, Oklahoma. The Carnegie Foundation later provided an additional $1,000 for additional work on the project. The library opened for use on January 18, 1912.

Cordell Carnegie Library was the only public library in Washita County until a small library was built in Sentinel, Oklahoma during the 1960s. However, the local paper (the Cordell Beacon), indicated that, as of January 28, 1981, individuals and school groups throughout the county continued their extensive use of the Cordell library.

== NRHP listing ==
The building was added to the National Register of Historic Places (as NRIS # 89001966) on November 13, 1989, under NRHP Criteria A and C. The Period of Significance is given as 1911 - 1939. It is also listed as a Contributing Structure for the New Cordell Courthouse Square Historic District, on the National Register (NRIS = # 98001592. Shortly after this statement was made, funding was provided by the city to pay for a new library structure. The old Carnegie Library became the property of the City of Cordell, which negotiated a long-term lease with the Cordell Historical Society to use the building as a museum.

== Building description ==
=== Exterior ===
The building is rectangular and measures 19 feet (5.8 m) north to south, and 42.5 feet (13.0 m) east to west. The first floor rises a half story above a full basement. It has a hipped roof, with mission-style parapets rising from the east and west walls and extending almost to the height of the ridge line. Steel rods that stabilize the parapets are terminated at each end with scrolled iron pieces. The original red tile Mission-style roof was removed in the 1950s and replaced with composition shingles. A safety handrail was installed on the front steps in 1985. Neither of these changes are judged to have altered the integrity of the building's location, setting, design, materials and/or workmanship.

The south elevation is the front of the building and has three bays. The entry is in the center bay, which is recessed between pilasters and under a compound segmented arch. The bays flanking the entry also have a compound segmented arch, but which contain a set of triple, single-light windows. Over each window is an arched transom, set with a stained-glass light. The center windows have been raised to allow installation of a window-type air cooler. The front facade also has paired double-hung basement windows, set in concrete window wells, with the top sash is above ground level. On the west side first floor, there is a single-light window on each side of the chimney; each is topped by a stained-glass transom; and set under a segmental arch. On the east side, there is a window identical to those on the west side. There is a smaller single-light window above a ground floor entrance to the basement. The basement windows have rowlock brick lintels and wood sills. The north facade has three arched, stained-glass transoms identical to those of the front facade. Sashes and frames of all windows are original.

The building has three entrances. The front entry is now an aluminum-frame door with plate glass. (Note: Originally, this was a wooden door with fifteen-light panels.) On the east side, near the northeast corner, is a ground-level entrance having a solid-core wood door, which replaced an older door in 1984.

=== Interior ===
At the time of the NRHP Application (1989), the building's interior was essentially unchanged from the original construction. There were two exceptions: (1) the original wood floor had been covered with carpet, and (2) the original plastered ceiling had been concealed by a drop ceiling with fluorescent fixtures. Both of these had been installed in the 1980s.

The first floor still consists of one large room (formerly the reading room). All of the interior woodwork and trim are original.
