= New Cordell Courthouse Square Historic District =

Historic district in Oklahoma, United States

- U.S. National Register of Historic Places
- U.S. Historic district
- Location within Oklahoma Location within the United States
- Location: Roughly bounded by Temple, E. Second, Glenn English, and E. Clay Streets, New Cordell, Oklahoma
- Coordinates: 35°17′30″N 98°59′22″W
- Area: 2.8 acres (1.1 ha)
- NRHP reference No.: 98001592
- Added to NRHP: January 7, 1999

The New Cordell Courthouse Square Historic District is a designated historic commercial district located in New Cordell, Washita County, Oklahoma. The district developed around the Washita County Courthouse, whose site was planned in 1897 when the town was originally laid out.

Most of the surrounding commercial buildings were constructed between 1900 and 1925, although several newer structures on First Street are also included within the district. In total, the district comprises 80 buildings, of which 52 are classified as contributing buildings that maintain the district's historic character.

The district was officially listed on the National Register of Historic Places on January 7, 1999.

== History ==
New Cordell was established in 1897, when the community of Cordell moved to a new townsite. The new townsite included a space for a courthouse square, and the residents of New Cordell soon applied to move the county seat there from Cloud Chief. New Cordell had a more central location and a better water supply than Cloud Chief; partly due to these reasons, an election in the late 1890s resulted in New Cordell winning the county seat, and the courthouse was moved there in 1900. After an extended legal battle, Congress legitimized the result of the election in 1904.

The relocation of the courthouse led to significant commercial growth in the courthouse square. The Bes Line Railroad (which later became part of the Frisco Railroad) opened a line through New Cordell in 1902, spurring the city's agricultural economy. Numerous brick commercial buildings were constructed on the courthouse square to house the city's new stores, professional offices, and specialty businesses. The present courthouse, the county's third, was built in 1910.

== Buildings ==
The Classical Revival courthouse, designed by Solomon Andrew Layton and his firm, is the centerpiece of the district. Major early buildings built on the courthouse square include the city hall, Florence Hospital, an opera house, and three banks. The many other commercial buildings in the district are mostly brick Commercial Style structures. The Mission Revival and Spanish Colonial Revival styles are also present in the district; one prominent example of these styles is the Cordell Carnegie Public Library on First Street. The U.S. Post Office, Washita County Jail, and New Cordell Fire and Police Station were added to the district in the 1930s and 1940s; all three buildings were Works Progress Administration projects and exhibit Moderne influences.
