= McLemore Site =

- U.S. National Register of Historic Places
- U.S. National Historic Landmark
- Nearest city: Colony, Washita County, Oklahoma
- Built: 1330
- NRHP reference No.: 66000636

Significant dates
- Added to NRHP: October 15, 1966
- Designated NHL: July 19, 1964

The McLemore Site, designated by the Smithsonian trinomial 34WA5, is a prehistoric archaeological site of the Southern Plains villagers located near Colony in Washita County, Oklahoma. It is the site of a prehistoric Plains Indian village, dating from AD 1330-1360, during the Washita River phase. The site is of historic importance for being a key element helping determine the chronology of prehistoric cultures in the region. It was declared a National Historic Landmark in 1964.

== Description ==
The McLemore Site is located on a terrace overlooking Cobb Creek outside the town of Colony in central western Oklahoma. The first major archaeological investigation took place in 1960 under the auspices of Dr. Robert E. Bell of Oklahoma State University. Three sections of the site were excavated: an area of cache and refuse pits, an area once containing a structure, and a cemetery with 48 burial sites. Artifacts found include pottery vessel fragments, a clay human effigy vessel, and stone tools and tool-making debitage. Also found were tools fashioned out of bone and shell beads.

The site finds show evidence of a common grouping of features related to a hunter-gatherer culture called the Washita River Focus (named after the Washita River in which watershed it is located), but with undisputed radiocarbon dates from an unusually early period. It was also the most westerly find of this culture to date, and set off a debate concerning its relationship with a similar complex of features called the Custer River Focus.

Clay figurines from the site suggest widespread tattooing by the residents of this site. Perforated bone pendants, used either in necklaces or ear ornaments, were also found at the site.

== Status ==
The site is on private property, about 4 miles (6.4 km) southeast of Colony on State Highway 4.Public access is not allowed.

== See also ==
- List of National Historic Landmarks in Oklahoma
- National Register of Historic Places listings in Washita County, Oklahoma
