= Elizabeth Anne Elliott =

American petroleum geologist

- Born: March 19, 1918; Cordell, Oklahoma, U.S.
- Died: July 7, 2001 (aged 83); Dallas, Texas, U.S.

Elizabeth Anne Elliott (March 19, 1918 – July 7, 2001) was a petroleum geologist. She was an active member of the American Association of Petroleum Geologists (AAPG) for 56 years, and was an elected fellow of the Geological Society of America.

== Early life and education ==
Elizabeth Anne Elliott (née Baker) was born on March 19, 1918, near Cordell, Oklahoma. Her father, Bruce W. Baker, was the only physician in Cordell, and as a young girl Elliott would accompany her father on his numerous travels to visit patients in their community. In high school, Elliott had the highest academic achievements of her class and became the valedictorian.

In 1940, she pursued a post-secondary education at the University of Oklahoma, and from a class of 40, she was one of 3 women who graduated with a Bachelor of Science in geology. Elliott had initially enrolled in pre-med but switched her major to geology because she was inspired by Charles Decker, one of the founders of the AAPG. To continue her studies, she attended the University of Colorado, where she held a teaching fellowship and research grant in micropaleontology during which she worked on cretaceous shales. She also founded a micropaleontology library at the University of Colorado. World War II interrupted her graduate education, and she was unable to finish her master's degree. Her work with cretaceous shales fostered a better understanding of the Cretaceous Interior Seaway.

== Career ==
After she married Guy Elliott and took his surname, the couple moved to Seattle, Washington, where Elizabeth Elliott took a job as a civil engineer at the United States Army Corps of Engineers. At the time, she also worked as a stratigrapher for the United States Geological Survey in Denver, Colorado.

Afterwards, Elliott worked in Midland, Texas for Gulf Oil. During her time working for Gulf Oil, she worked at well sites, which was very rare for a woman in the 1940s. Later, she worked for the company Mobil Oil in both New York City and in Dallas, Texas. After her husband's death in 1960, Elliott moved to Mobil's Oklahoma City office, where she worked on the stratigraphy of the Permian and the Arkoma basins. While with Mobil Oil, Elliott evaluated offshore Atlantic basins. She trained many young geologists, who nicknamed her “Aunt Betty.”

At 67 years old, she opened her own petroleum geology consulting office in Dallas. Elliott was said to have "excelled at sample identification."

Throughout her career, she was an active member of the AAPG. She served as the second vice president for the Dallas Geological Society from 1985-1986. At age 81, Elliott received the Pioneer Award at the AAPG Annual Convention, marking the first time the award had ever been given to a woman.

== Death ==
Elliott was an active member of her neighborhood Protestant Christian churches. When she died on July 7, 2001, at age 83, funeral services were held for her by her church communities in Dallas, Texas, where she lived at her death, and in her childhood hometown of Cordell, Oklahoma. She was laid to rest in Cordell.
