= International Order of the Rainbow for Girls =

Masonic youth service organization

- Abbreviation: IORG
- Founded: 1922; 104 years ago
- Founded at: McAlester, Oklahoma, U.S.
- Type: 501(c)(3)
- Tax ID no.: 73-0474600
- Headquarters: International Temple, Supreme Assembly, McAlester, Oklahoma, U.S.
- Coordinates: 34.9325°N 95.7647°W
- Employees: 3 (2019)
- Volunteers: 650 (2019)
- Website: www.gorainbow.org

The International Order of the Rainbow for Girls (IORG) is a Masonic youth service organization that teaches leadership training through community service. Young women learn about the value of charity and service through their work and involvement with their annual local and Grand (state or country) service projects. Historically, the order welcomed girls from age eleven to twenty years old with or without a family connection to Freemasonry. The modern organization is open to all regardless of race or religion.

== History ==
The order came into existence in 1922, when the Reverend W. Mark Sexson, a Freemason, was asked to make an address before South McAlester Chapter #149, Order of the Eastern Star, in McAlester, Oklahoma. As the Order of DeMolay had come under his close study during his Masonic activities, he suggested that a similar order for young women would be beneficial. The first Initiation consisted of a class of 171 young women on April 6, 1922, in the auditorium of the Scottish Rite Temple in McAlester, Oklahoma. The original name was "Order of the Rainbow for Girls".

== Officers ==
Members can hold many different offices (also called Stations) in the local Assembly. Each requires some memory work and all but two serve for one term (four or six months out of the year, depending on Assembly bylaws). Some offices are elected by the other members in the assembly. These offices normally include Faith, Hope, Charity, Worthy Associate Advisor, and Worthy Advisor. There are also two offices that are elected in January but serve a full year which are Treasurer and Recorder. The other offices are appointed by the Worthy Advisor (President) and Mother Advisor. All offices include:

- Worthy Advisor (WA) – presides at meetings and plans activities for her term like a president: the highest office in an assembly
- Worthy Associate Advisor (WAA) – duties similar to a vice president; presides over a meeting in the absence of the worthy advisor
- Charity teaches about charitable deeds
- Hope teaches that hope is always there for us
- Faith teaches that faith is our constant companion. She is the officer who guides new candidates throughout an initiation ceremony.
- Recorder records minutes and handles correspondence
- Treasurer handles money and bills and compiles reports about the balances of the assembly's various money accounts
- Chaplain leads in prayers
- Drill Leader leads the officers in their floor work and leads guests around the assembly room
- Seven Bow Stations teach lessons about the colors of the rainbow and their corresponding virtues:
  - Love (red) in all its forms
  - Religion (orange) the importance of religion in all its forms (based on love and forgiveness)
  - Nature (yellow) its importance in your daily life
  - Immortality (green) the understanding of death is a part of life
  - Fidelity (blue) emphasis on being honest and reliable
  - Patriotism (indigo) encouraging citizenship to your country
  - Service (violet) service to others which bind all the colors together
- Confidential Observer guards the inner doors of the assembly room
- Outer Observer guards the outer doors of the assembly room
- Musician and Choir Director provide music for the meetings

Some Assemblies and Grand Assemblies have other officers not specified in the ritual, such as Historian, Editor, Assistant Grand Editor, Circulation Manager, Orator (or Lecturer), Bible Bearer, Goodwill Ambassador, American Flag Bearer, State Flag Bearer, Christian Flag Bearer, Rainbow Flag Bearer, and Assembly Banner Bearer.

It is an unwritten rule that each of the line officers (Faith, Hope, Charity, and Worthy Associate Advisor) advances to the next highest office, culminating in her term as Worthy Advisor. However, this is not a guarantee.

== Advisors ==
The local assembly is governed by an advisory board of seven to fifteen adults consisting of master masons, members of Order of the Eastern Star, members of the Order of Amaranth, majority members, and family members of active members. Some advisory boards are appointed by a sponsoring body, while others are a "club" style and are not sponsored. Elected offices of an advisory board are Chairperson, Mother Advisor, Secretary, and Treasurer. The mother advisor is the liaison between the members and the advisory board. Almost all of the assembly work should be done by the members, with the advisors in support roles only. A district deputy is appointed by the supreme inspector/deputy as an aide to the local assemblies. The authority of the district deputy is limited to inspecting the ceremonial work of the assembly and providing guidance at the request of the advisory board or supreme inspector/deputy. The district deputy is not a member of the advisory board but is a resource and a reference as well as the first person the mother advisor and board chair would go to for help and questions.

== High honors ==
The appointing of Grand Officers varies from jurisdiction to jurisdiction. Generally, to be appointed or elected to a Grand Floor Office, a member must be a past or present worthy advisor in her assembly. Grand representatives may also be PWAs, but it is not mandatory. Other offices include: Grand Choir, Grand Assistant Outer Observer/Grand Confidential Observer Helper, Personal Page, and Grand Page at Large. Each jurisdiction has their own traditions.

The Grand Cross of Color is the highest award given to a member or adult leader for outstanding service. Recipients of the award (Masters of the Grand Cross of Color) are expected to meet once per year for a special service. In order for designates to be nominated, the assembly must initiate 3 new members within a calendar year. For every 3 new members, one member may be chosen to receive the Grand Cross of Color for service rendered above and beyond what is expected for Rainbow. The Masters of the Grand Cross of Color meet with the Advisory Board to decide which member(s) to nominate as a designee for the Grand Cross of Color. The Grand Cross of Color may also be awarded to adults that serve the assembly, but there may be no more adults than young women that are nominated. In addition, adult sponsors without Masonic affiliation are awarded the Service to Rainbow in place of the Grand Cross of Color.

=== Supreme Assembly ===
The governing body of Rainbow is the House of Gold. New members are elected by current members. The House of Gold consists of the Supreme Officers (paralleling a local Assembly), Supreme Inspectors (chief advisor for a jurisdiction), and several others making up a total of 50.

Presiding Supreme Inspectors may retire their duties at any time, unless they are elected to the Supreme line, at which time they must find a successor by the time they reach Supreme Worthy Associate Advisor. The current Supreme Inspector chooses the person whom they believe can best associate with the members of their jurisdiction. That person will become the next Supreme Deputy. It isn't until Supreme Deputies are elected into the House of Gold that they become Supreme Inspectors. There are 50 seats in the House of Gold, and they are lifetime appointments. A Supreme Deputy is eligible for recommendation into the House of Gold after her 3rd Supreme Assembly after being installed as Supreme Deputy (the Supreme at which they are installed does NOT count).

== Locations ==
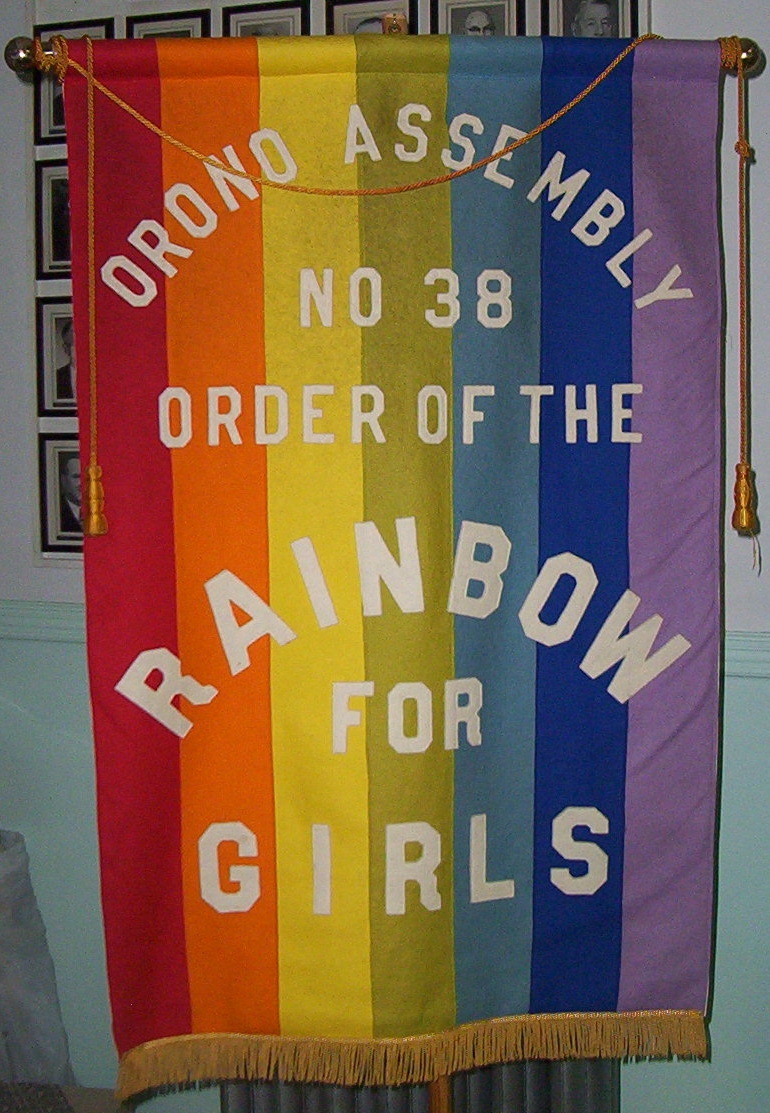
Assembly banner

The International Order of the Rainbow for Girls has assemblies in 46 states in the United States as well as in several other countries. The states without assemblies are Delaware, Minnesota, Utah, and Wyoming.

The countries outside the United States that have assemblies are Aruba, Australia (in Queensland, New South Wales and South Australia), Bolivia, Brazil (in Parana, São Paulo, Distrito Federal, Minas Gerais, Mato Grosso do Sul, Tocantins, Pará, Espírito Santo and Santa Catarina [ Biguaçu ]), Canada (in Ontario and New Brunswick), Paraguay (in Asuncion, Encarnación, Ciudad del Este and Concepción), the Philippines, Italy, Mexico, and Romania. Rainbow has had assemblies in other countries, mostly due to American military presence: Cuba, Germany, France, Panama and Vietnam.

Its headquarters are at the International Temple in McAlester, Oklahoma built in 1950-1951 for the Order's use.

== Membership ==
Being related to a Master Mason or member of Eastern Star no longer is a requirement for Rainbow membership. Interested young women must submit an application and associated fee to an Assembly. The members of that Assembly will meet with the young woman to answer any questions she or her parents/guardians may have and to make sure she is a proper candidate to receive the degrees. A proper candidate, by guidelines of the order is a girl within the appropriate age range who believes in the existence of a Supreme Being, does not cohabit with a significant other, has had no children, is not pregnant, has never been married, and has the permission of her parents/guardians to become a member. Once the application is accepted, the assembly will vote on accepting the candidate into the Assembly. Membership then starts with an Initiation Ceremony.

Members are expected to serve their community, be law-abiding, acknowledge the authority of the Supreme Assembly, and show loyalty to the other members, among other things. In 2000, the rules for Eastern Star were changed so that majority members of Rainbow were eligible for membership in that Order. For girls between ages 6 and 10, some jurisdictions have a "Pledge" program for prospective members, so that they can become familiar with Rainbow ceremonies and activities.

Majority Membership is reached in two ways. A young woman receives age majority when she reaches her 20th birthday, or marriage majority if she marries before age 20. Also, depending on the jurisdiction, young women are given the choice of extending their membership until they reach the age of 21. For this to be granted, the young woman must write a letter expressing her interest in extending her active service and present it to her Supreme Deputy/Inspector.
