= National Register of Historic Places listings in Carter County, Oklahoma =

Location of Carter County in Oklahoma

This is a list of the National Register of Historic Places listings in Carter County, Oklahoma.

This is intended to be a complete list of the properties and districts on the National Register of Historic Places in Carter County, Oklahoma, United States. The locations of National Register properties and districts for which the latitude and longitude coordinates are included below, may be seen in a map.

There are 23 properties and districts listed on the National Register in the county.

This National Park Service list is complete through NPS recent listings posted August 28, 2026.

== Current listings ==
| | Name on the Register | Image | Date listed | Location | City or town | Description |
|---|---|---|---|---|---|---|
| 1 | Ardmore Carnegie Library | Ardmore Carnegie Library | June 2, 2000 (#00000620) | 511 Stanley, SW. 34°10′14″N 97°08′07″W | Ardmore | |
| 2 | Ardmore Historic Commercial District | Ardmore Historic Commercial District | March 14, 1983 (#83002080) | Main St. from the former Santa Fe railroad tracks to B St., N. Washington from Main to 2nd Ave., NE., and Caddo from Main to the northern side of 2nd Ave., NE. 34°10′16″N 97°07′41″W | Ardmore | |
| 3 | Ardmore Municipal Auditorium | Ardmore Municipal Auditorium | March 8, 2006 (#06000117) | 220 West Broadway; 34°10′27″N 97°07′50″W | Ardmore | |
| 4 | Bethel Missionary Baptist Church | Bethel Missionary Baptist Church | January 12, 1995 (#94001519) | Southeastern corner of the junction of Webster and Lane Sts. 34°28′56″N 97°27′41″W | Tatums | |
| 5 | Black Theater of Ardmore | Black Theater of Ardmore | June 22, 1984 (#84002978) | 536 E. Main St. 34°10′13″N 97°07′22″W | Ardmore | |
| 6 | Brady Cabin | | December 5, 1977 (#77001090) | 38 miles northwest of Ardmore; 34°25′21″N 97°25′45″W | Ardmore | |
| 7 | Carter County Courthouse | Carter County Courthouse | March 22, 1985 (#85000678) | 1st and B Sts., SW. 34°10′19″N 97°07′47″W | Ardmore | |
| 8 | Central Park Bandstand | Central Park Bandstand | December 6, 2006 (#06001111) | Southwest of the junction of W. Main and E St., SW. in about the middle of Central Park; 34°10′25″N 97°08′03″W | Ardmore | |
| 9 | Choctaw, Oklahoma and Gulf Railroad Viaduct | | December 11, 2007 (#07001266) | Junction of G St., NE. and the abandoned roadbed of the St. Louis – San Francisco Railway; 34°10′44″N 97°07′06″W | Ardmore | Demolished between 2009 and 2012 |
| 10 | Dornick Hills Country Club | Dornick Hills Country Club | September 2, 2003 (#03000877) | 519 N. Country Club Rd. 34°13′12″N 97°08′15″W | Ardmore | |
| 11 | Douglass High School Auditorium | Douglass High School Auditorium | July 11, 1984 (#84002981) | 800 M St., NE. 34°10′49″N 97°07′21″W | Ardmore | |
| 12 | Dunbar School | Dunbar School | June 22, 1984 (#84002985) | 13 6th St., SE. 34°10′10″N 97°07′14″W | Ardmore | |
| 13 | Galt-Franklin Home | Galt-Franklin Home | May 22, 1986 (#86001132) | 400 Country Club Rd. 34°12′56″N 97°08′08″W | Ardmore | Demolished |
| 14 | Hardy Murphy Coliseum | Hardy Murphy Coliseum | March 8, 2006 (#06000118) | 600 Lake Murray Dr., S. 34°09′42″N 97°07′11″W | Ardmore | |
| 15 | Healdton Armory | Healdton Armory | April 7, 1994 (#94000280) | Junction of 4th and Franklin Sts. 34°14′01″N 97°29′13″W | Healdton | |
| 16 | Healdton Oil Field Bunk House | | September 26, 1985 (#85002518) | North of Wilson; 34°13′02″N 97°24′34″W | Wilson | |
| 17 | Johnson Home | Johnson Home | May 22, 1986 (#86001133) | 400 Country Club Rd. 34°12′54″N 97°08′04″W | Ardmore | |
| 18 | Lake Murray State Park | Lake Murray State Park | October 12, 2001 (#01001097) | 1.9 miles southeast of the junction of U.S. Routes 70 and 77; 34°04′56″N 97°04′13″W | Ardmore | |
| 19 | Oklahoma, New Mexico and Pacific Railroad Depot | Oklahoma, New Mexico and Pacific Railroad Depot | July 22, 1982 (#82003671) | N. Washington and NE. 3rd 34°10′35″N 97°07′36″W | Ardmore | |
| 20 | Sayre-Mann House | Sayre-Mann House | May 11, 1982 (#82003672) | 323 F St., SW. 34°10′07″N 97°08′09″W | Ardmore | |
| 21 | Turner House | Turner House | September 9, 2013 (#13000703) | 1501 3rd Ave., SW. 34°10′12″N 97°08′50″W | Ardmore | |
| 22 | Young Cemetery | | December 1, 2020 (#100005859) | 1/8th of a mi. north of Seven Sisters Hills Rd. 34°17′50″N 96°58′36″W | Ardmore vicinity | |
| 23 | Zaneis School Teacher's Dormitory | | August 15, 1985 (#85001800) | Off U.S. Route 70; 34°10′20″N 97°29′58″W | Healdton | Demolished |

== See also ==
- List of National Historic Landmarks in Oklahoma
- National Register of Historic Places listings in Oklahoma
