= Washita County Courthouse =

- U.S. National Register of Historic Places
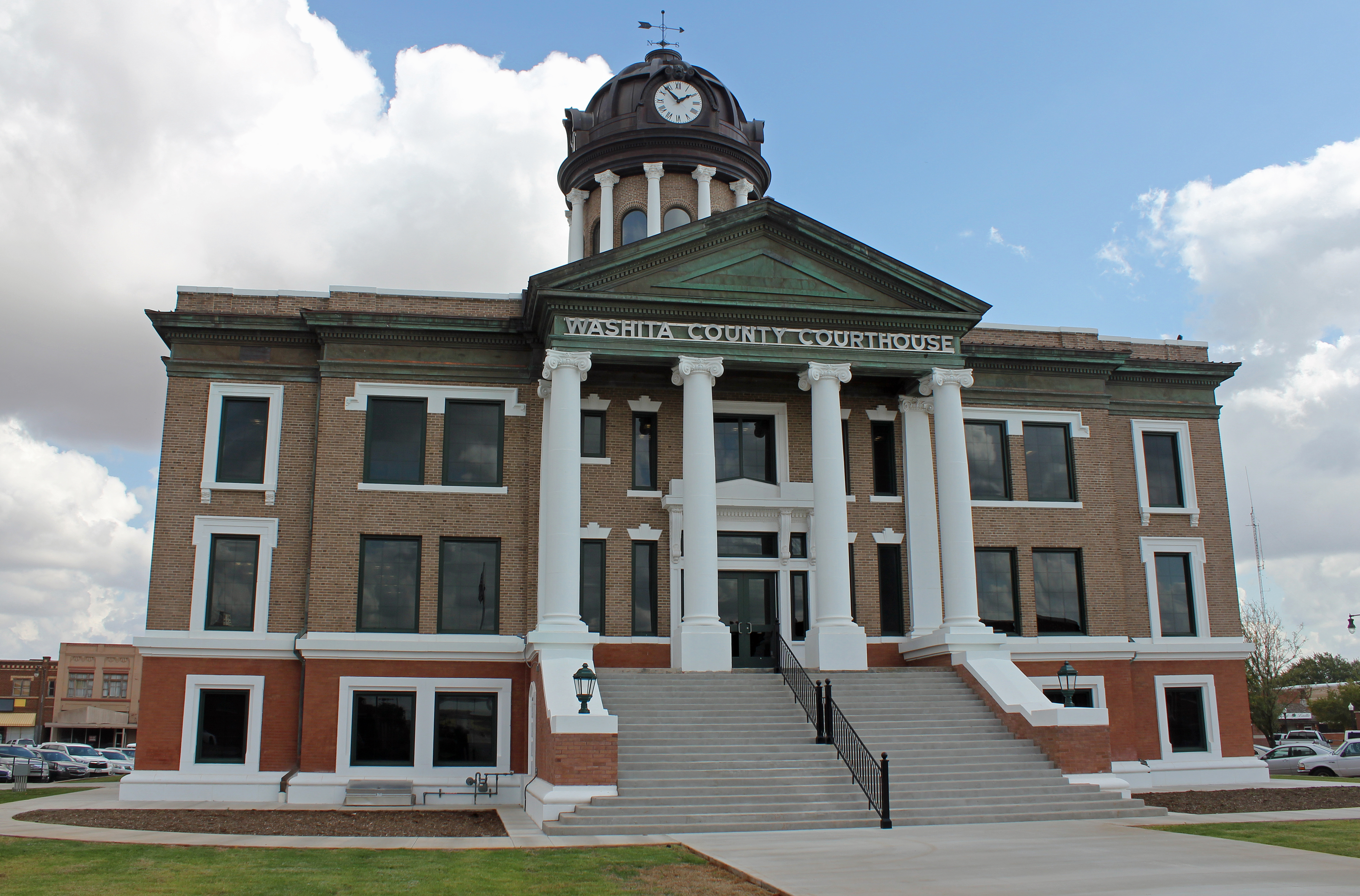
- The courthouse in 2015, following renovation.

- Location within Oklahoma Location within the United States
- Interactive map showing the location of Washita County Courthouse
- Location: Courthouse Sq., Cordell, Oklahoma
- Coordinates: 35°17′27″N 98°59′22″W
- Area: 1 acre (0.40 ha)
- Built: 1910
- Built by: Donathan & Moore
- Architect: Layton, Wemyss, Smith & Hawk
- Architectural style: Classical Revival
- MPS: County Courthouses of Oklahoma TR
- NRHP reference No.: 84003452
- Added to NRHP: August 24, 1984

The Washita County Courthouse, located in Courthouse Square in New Cordell, is the county courthouse serving Washita County, Oklahoma. The Classical Revival courthouse was built in 1910. It was added to the National Register of Historic Places on August 24, 1984.

== History ==
When Washita County was established in 1892, an act of Congress designated Cloud Chief as the county seat, and the county's first wood-frame courthouse was built there. After the town of Cordell moved to the New Cordell townsite, city leaders petitioned for the county seat to be moved to New Cordell, which had a more central location and a better source of water. An election transferred the county seat to New Cordell in the late 1890s, and the original courthouse building was moved in 1900; after an extended legal battle, Congress legitimized the result of the election in 1904. A new wood-frame courthouse was built in 1902; however, this building burned down in 1909. The present courthouse was built the following year. New Cordell's business district developed around the courthouse, as the relocation of the county seat was a major economic stimulus for the city.

== Architecture ==
Solomon Andrew Layton, one of Oklahoma's most significant early 20th century architects, and his firm designed the Classical Revival courthouse. The three-story courthouse is topped by a copper dome with clocks on all four sides. The two main entrances, located on the east and west sides, each feature stairways leading to massive porticoes. Each portico has a triangular pediment supported by four Ionic columns. The first floor has a red brick exterior; a white water table separates it from the light brick upper floors. The courthouse's roof line features a copper entablature and projecting cornice.
