= International Temple, Supreme Assembly, Order of the Rainbow for Girls =

- U.S. National Register of Historic Places
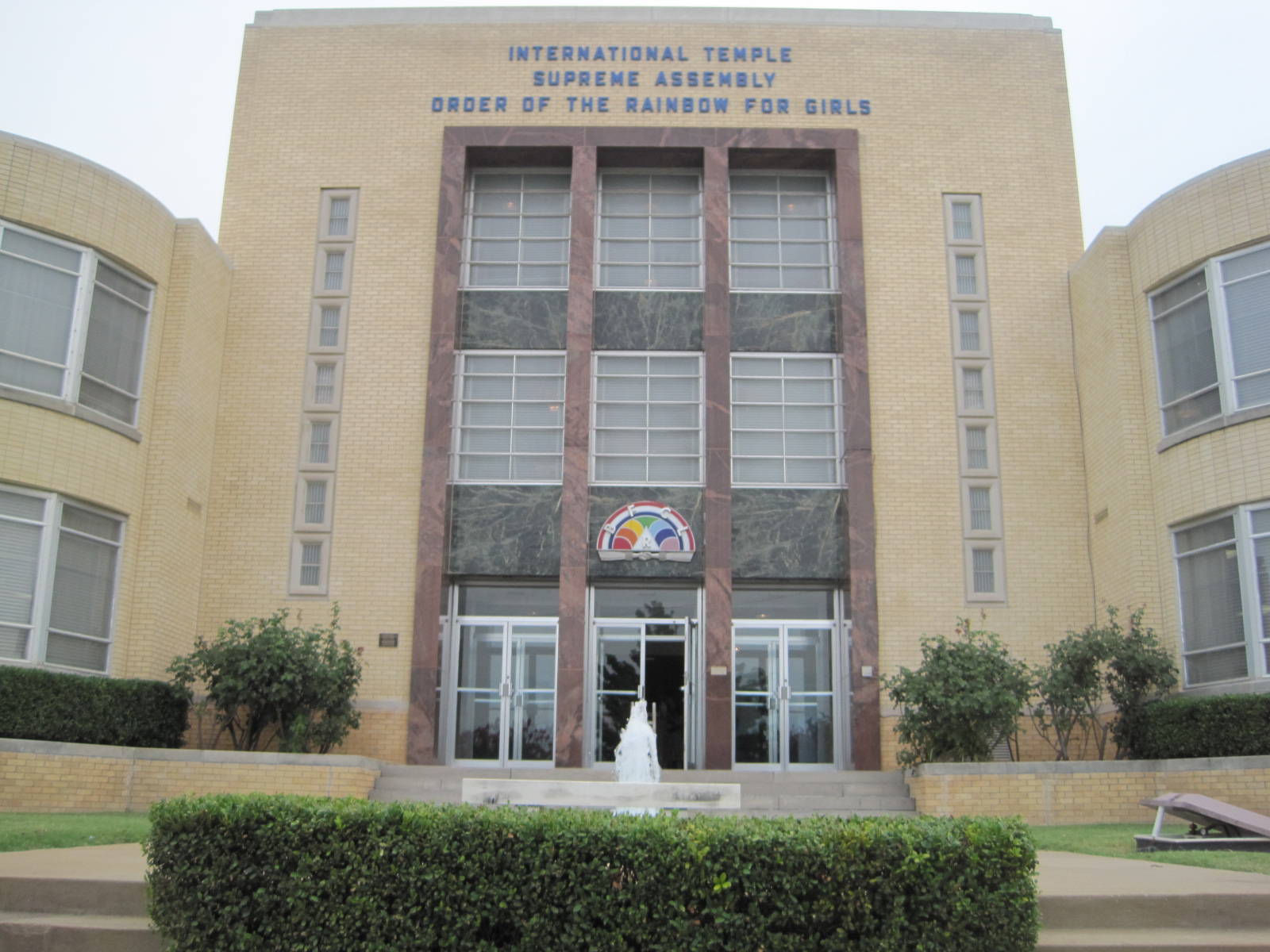
- Front face of the Supreme Temple

- Location within Oklahoma
- Location: 315 East Carl Albert Parkway, McAlester, Oklahoma
- Coordinates: 34.9325°N 95.7647°W
- Built: 1950-1951
- Built by: Dewey Loveall
- Architect: Black and West
- Architectural style: Moderne
- NRHP reference No.: 13000393
- Added to NRHP: June 14, 2013

The International Temple, Supreme Assembly, Order of the Rainbow for Girls is a building in McAlester, Oklahoma, United States that serves as the headquarters for the International Order of the Rainbow for Girls. It was listed on the National Register of Historic Places on July 14, 2013.

The Order of the Rainbow for Girls was founded in McAlester on April 6, 1922, by Rev. W. Mark Sexson. From the initial installation class of 86 girls, the Order grew to 50,000 members in 1940. In 1941, the Order began plans for a larger office building that would serve as a memorial to those who had made the Order possible, and a shrine for members worldwide. The building was designed by the Tulsa firm Black and West, and the funds for the building were approved at the 1950 Supreme Assembly session. The contract for the construction was granted to the Dewey Loveall Construction Company in August 1950, and the cornerstone was Masonically laid on May 2, 1951.

The building was first opened to the public on November 18, 1951.
