= Cain's Coffee Building =

Building in Oklahoma City, United States

Coordinates: 35°28′53″N 97°30′45″W

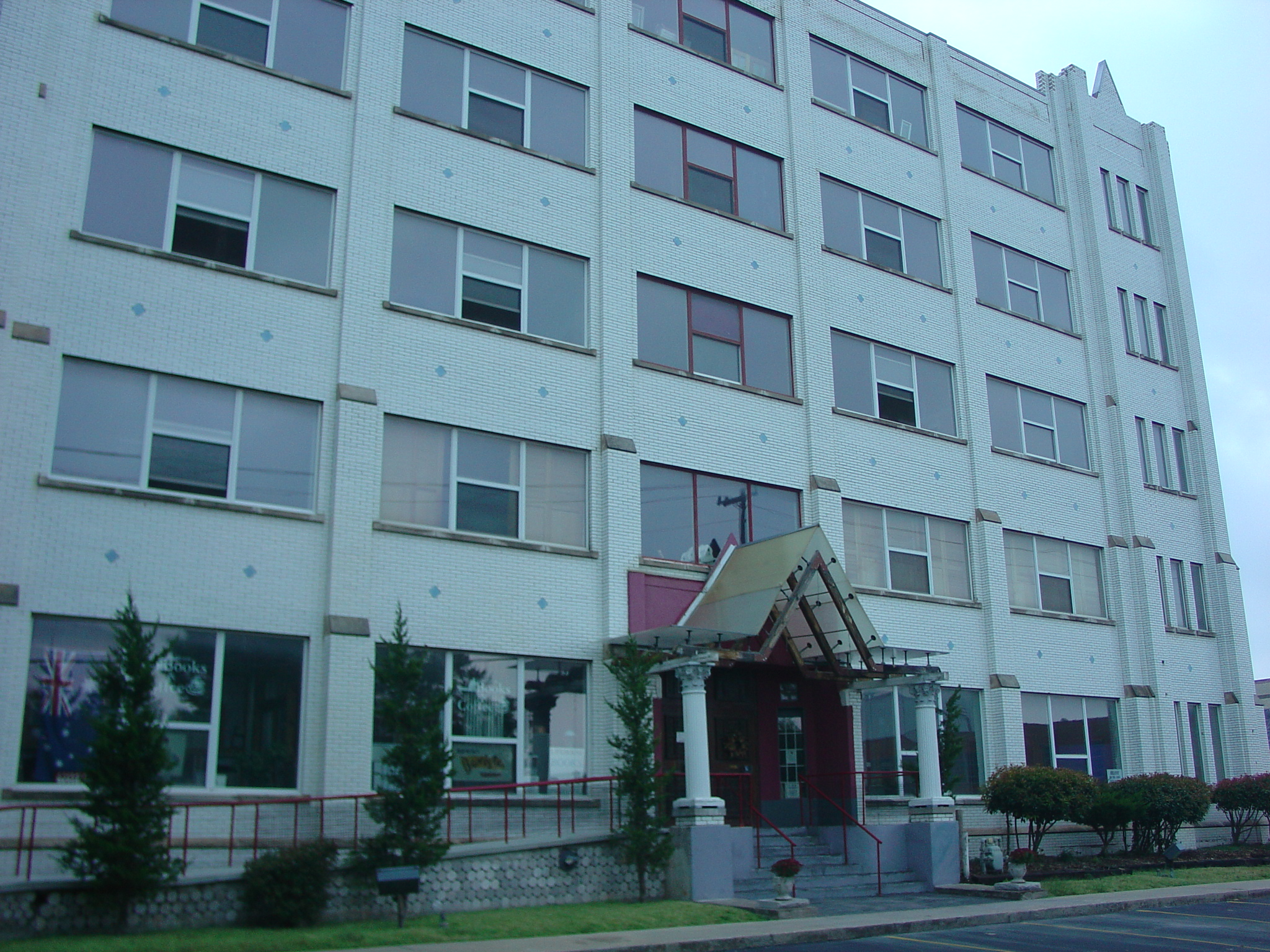
The Cain's Coffee Building

The Cain's Coffee Building was built in 1918 in Oklahoma City. It is located at 1 NW Twelfth Street just off of Broadway. This white glazed brick Art Deco revival building is five stories high with a full basement and is 50,000 square feet (4,600 m^{2}).

It was built as a CCC Citizen's Conservation Corps project and occupied by an Extract Company, Seelye Mattress Company, and the most famous Cain's Coffee Company. The company that became Cain's Coffee was established in 1919 by William Morgan Cain Sr., who was born in 1894 and came to Choctaw, Okla., in 1900 with his widowed mother. Cain joined the Navy in 1911 and his tour of duty included a trip in Brazil, where he was fascinated with the enormous stacks of bagged coffee on the docks. After his discharge from the Navy, Cain was employed by the Western Coffee and Tea Co. of Oklahoma City. In 1919, he established a one-man operation to roast, grind, package and deliver coffee for sale to the retail grocers. Cain was president until 1937, when he was elected chairman of the board. Also when Richard J. Clements, who became an investor and officer in 1932, was named president. Both Cain and Clements worked and advocated the policy of buying coffee, tea and spice directly from the source and shipping the raw products to Oklahoma City for processing and packaging.

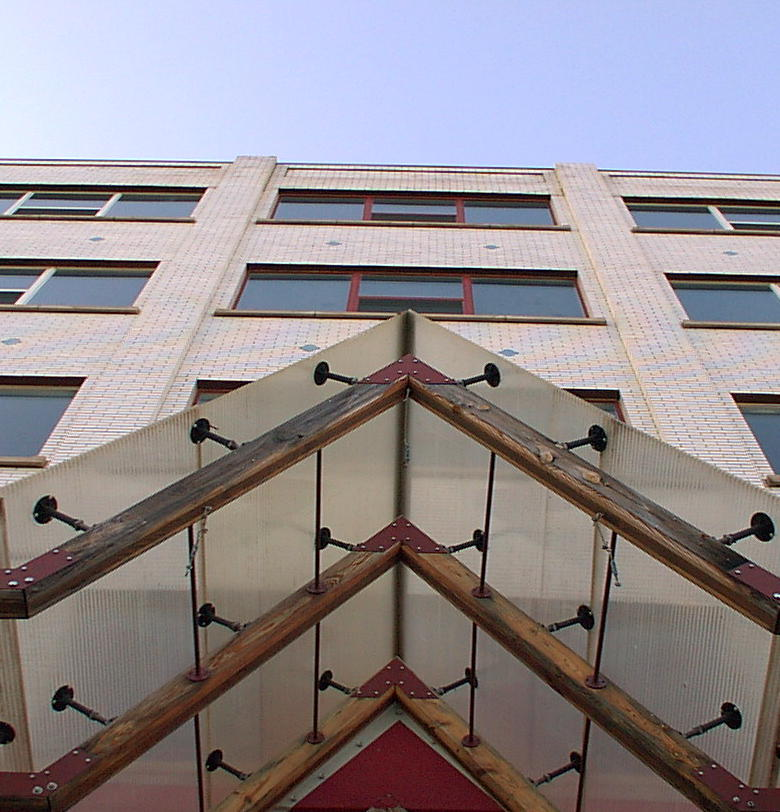
front entry canopy

It has been most recently renovated by the LifeHouse organization and Stanley Engle, an architect who trained at the University of Oklahoma and De Montfort University in Leicester, England. It contains a museum, coffee and bookstore and apartments. It is open to the public five days a week.
