= Art Deco Lofts and Apartments =

Building in Tulsa, Oklahoma, US

Coordinates: 36.150°N 95.990°W

Art Deco Lofts and Apartments (2016)
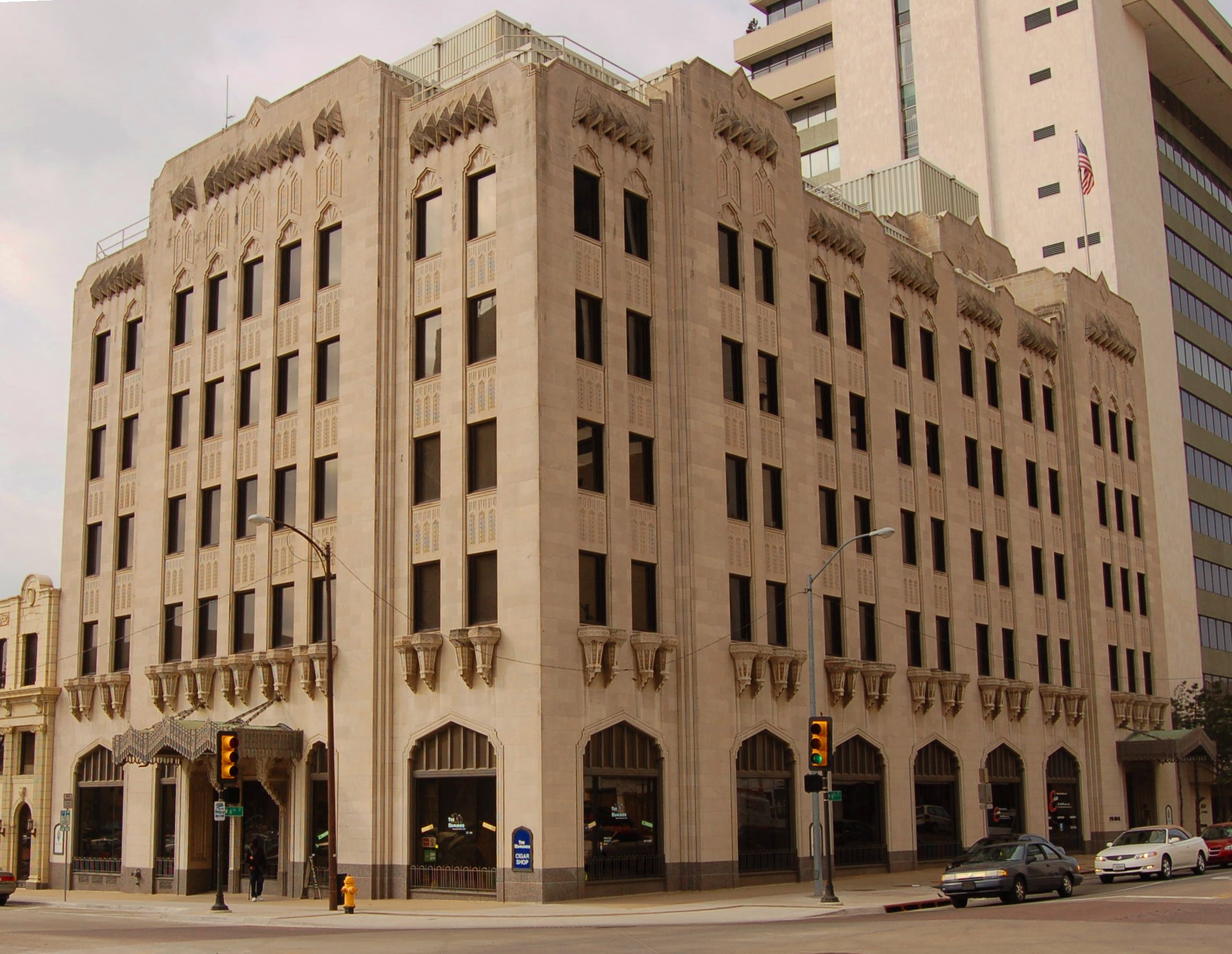
- Public Service Co. of Oklahoma Building (Renamed Art Deco Lofts and Apartments in 2016) 2 West 6th Street Tulsa, Oklahoma
- Interactive map of the Art Deco Lofts and Apartments (2016) area
- Alternative names: Public Service Co. of Oklahoma (PSO) Building; TransOK Building; Art Deco Lofts and Apartments

General information
- Status: Active
- Type: Art Deco
- Architectural style: Zig zag
- Location: 2 West 6th Street, Tulsa, Oklahoma, U.S.A.
- Inaugurated: 1929

Height
- Height: 120 feet (37 m)

Technical details
- Size: 66,047 square feet (6,136.0 m^{2})
- Floor count: 7
- Floor area: residential 53,747 square feet (4,993.3 m^{2}) commercial 10,962 square feet (1,018.4 m^{2})
- Grounds: 11,200 square feet (0.26 acres)

Design and construction
- Architect: Arthur M. Atkinson Joseph R. Koberling (designer)
- Developer: Stuart Price

Other information
- Number of units: 37 apartments

In 1899, the Vinita Electric Light, Ice and Power Company, which was headquartered in the Indian Territory town of Vinita (now in Oklahoma) obtained a charter to provide electric power to that community. In 1913, the company consolidated with similar independent companies in Tulsa, Guthrie, Coalgate, Lehigh and Atoka to form a new company, named Public Service Company of Oklahoma (PSO). The founder and first president of PSO was Frederick William "Fred" Insull, who moved the company's headquarters to Tulsa in 1916. (Note: Fred Insull (1875-1939) was a nephew of Samuel Insull.)

The Public Service Co. of Oklahoma Building, originally completed in 1929, was the headquarters of the electric service utility in Tulsa, Oklahoma, Public Service Co. of Oklahoma (PSC). It was known by that name until its owner (then known as PSO) was acquired by Central & Southwest Corporation (CSC), a major utility holding company, when the building was renamed as the PSO Building. CSC was later acquired by a larger holding company, American Electric Power Company, which retained PSO as an operating company serving customers in the state of Oklahoma. It was listed on the National Register of Historic Places (NRIS #84003443) on April 10, 1984. It was added as a Contributing Property to the Oil Capital Historic District in 2010.

PSO vacated this building and sold it to a California real estate investor in 2005. PSO then moved its personnel to the former Central High School building in downtown Tulsa, moves which were completed in 2007. The investor, Maurice Kanbar held the building until 2012, when he sold it, as part of a package, to Stuart Price, one of his associates. The new owner decided to repurpose the building from corporate offices to luxury apartments, and spent several years thoroughly renovating the interior. He also renamed the building Art Deco Lofts and Apartments. Apartment buyers began moving into the building in mid 2016.

== Building history ==
Arthur M. Atkinson was the principal architect for the building when it was constructed in 1928-9. Joseph R. Koberling Jr. was the designer. The cost of constructing the building was reportedly $425,000 in 1929 dollars.

== Structure ==
The building is constructed of reinforced concrete, with a structural steel frame, and a covering of light gray Bedford limestone. (Note: This is claimed to be the same type of limestone used in constructing the Empire State Building and the Statue of Liberty.) All the windows have steel frames. The ground floor has large display windows, since PSO also promoted and sold electric appliances during its early life, to promote its main product - electricity. These display windows are decorated with Gothic-type arches, which were often used in a predecessor of Art Deco style.

PSO reportedly instructed Atkinson and Koberling that they should feature exterior lighting, which was a novel concept in 1929.

== Repurposing the building ==
Soon after this building was purchased in 2005 by California real estate investor Maurice Kanbar, PSO moved its headquarters to the former Tulsa Central High School Building, which had already moved into a new building in northwest Tulsa. Kanbar held the almost empty building until 2012, when he sold it to a former business partner, Stuart Price. About that time, it was announced that the building would be repurposed - in this case converted to a residential facility. The upper stories of the interior would be rebuilt to create 37 luxury studios and apartments, (Note: Wiktionary defines a studio apartment as having the kitchen, living area, and sleeping area in a single room.) ranging in size from 500 square feet (46 m^{2}) to 1,150 square feet (107 m^{2}).

At the end of July, 2016, the building had been renamed Art Deco Lofts and Apartments, and the newest residents began moving in.

Restructuring of the energy industry created a substantial glut of office space in Tulsa during the late 20th Century and early 21st Century, as companies downsized their Tulsa operations. Many companies moved entire operations to other cities, especially Houston. Many large, well-known buildings soon became vacant, and were put up for sale by the former owners. Professional real estate developers moved in to buy up many of these distressed properties.
