= Cedar Creek District =

- U.S. National Register of Historic Places
- Nearest city: Carnegie, Oklahoma
- Area: 3,360 acres (1,360 ha)
- NRHP reference No.: 75001577
- Added to NRHP: May 29, 1975

The Cedar Creek District, also known as the Cedar Creek Locality Archaeological Site, is a Pleistocene archaeological site near Carnegie, Washita County, Oklahoma. The site was inhabited by early humans during the late Pleistocene; these humans used stone tools to hunt herd animals in the area. Artifacts recovered from the site include projectile points, a mammoth skeleton, and fireplace lenses. At the time of its discovery, it was the sole known Pleistocene habitation site in the eastern Great Plains.

The site was added to the National Register of Historic Places on May 29, 1975.
