= Southwestern Bell Main Dial Building =

- U.S. National Register of Historic Places
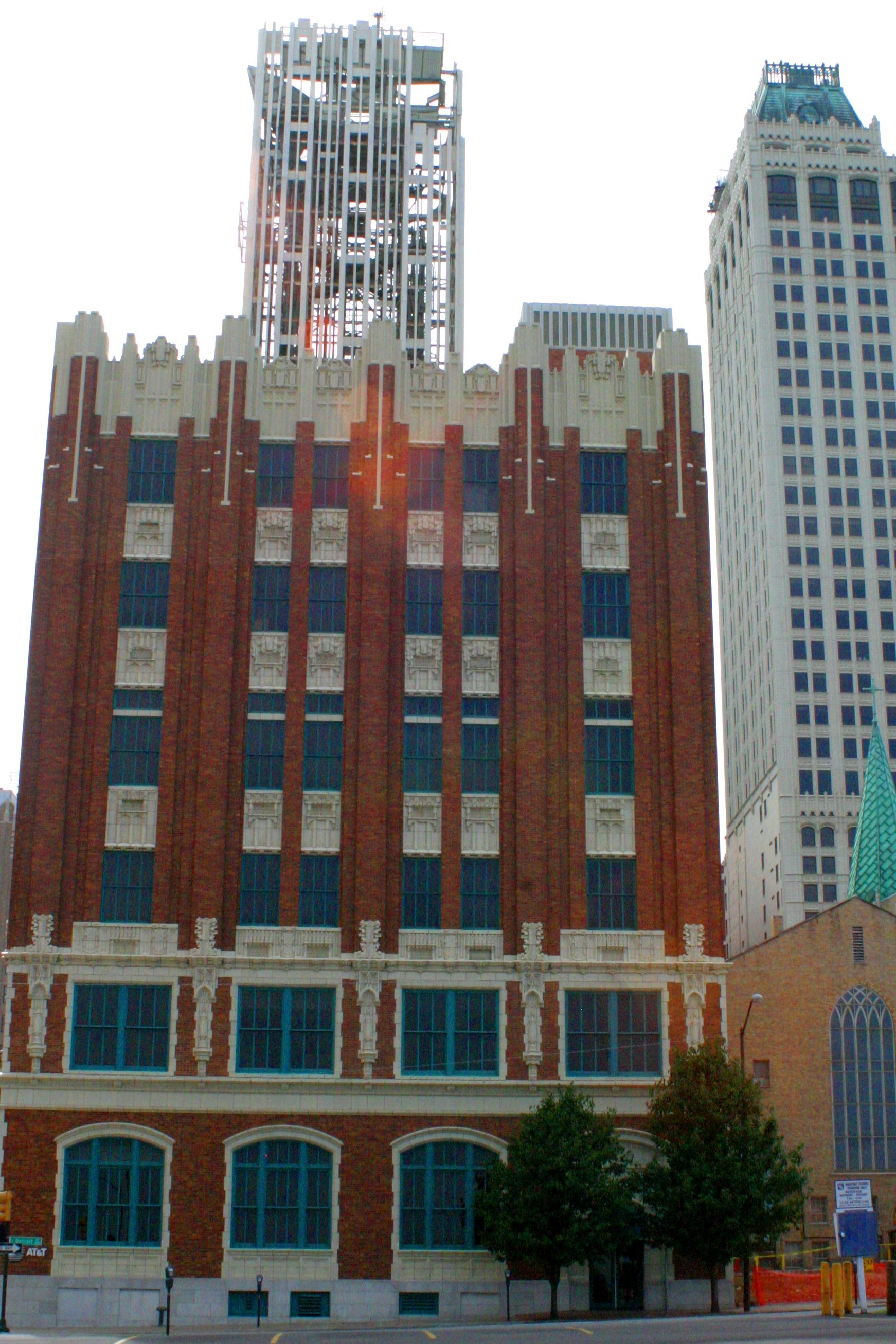
- Southwestern Bell Main Dial Building in 2005, 5th Street and Detroit Avenue, Tulsa.
- Location: 5th Street and Detroit Avenue
- Coordinates: 36.15285°N 95.98697°W
- Built: 1924 (Phase 1) 1930 (Phase 2)
- Architect: Ben Ball, I. R. Timlin
- Architectural style: Gothic Revival (Phase 1); Zig Zag Art Deco (Phase 2)
- NRHP reference No.: 84003445
- Added to NRHP: June 22, 1984

The Southwestern Bell Main Dial Building is a historic telephone exchange building in Tulsa, Oklahoma, United States, built for the Southwestern Bell Telephone Company in 1924. The original two-story Gothic Revival structure, which encompassed 18,726 square feet (1,739.7 m^{2}), was to house the main dial equipment for the new automatic dial equipment that the company had introduced to Tulsa in November 1924. In 1930, the company added four floors to the top of the 1924 structure to house its divisional offices and toll terminal equipment needed for the underground cable that connected Tulsa with Oklahoma City. The 1930 addition was constructed in Zig Zag Art Deco Style.

== Building description ==
Southwestern Bell intended to build a two-story building to house its new automatic dial equipment in 1924. However, company engineers expected to add more stories in the future as the Tulsa telephone system expanded. They specified that the initial support structure be capable of carrying at least seven more stories.

The original two-story building was designed using Gothic Style architecture, which was then in vogue in the United States. The exterior was covered in light brown brick. The first floor has large arched windows framed with terra cotta. The color of the frames matches that of the quoins that reach to the top of the second floor. The second-floor windows are rectangular and separated by brick panels decorated with terra cotta torches. The second floor spandrels are made of buff-colored terra cotta tile.

== Addition to NRHP ==
Southwestern Bell Dial Telephone building was added to the National Register of Historic Places under criteria A and C on June 22, 1984. Its reference number is 84003445.

== Early history of telephone service in Tulsa ==
The U. S. Army installed the first telephone system in Indian Territory in 1879, between Fort Sill and Fort Reno, to support its operations to control the native tribes. By 1879, the Cherokee Nation installed the first commercial system in Indian Territory to connect the tribal offices in Talequah and Muskogee to the Five Civilized Tribes agency at Muskogee. This system also connected to Fort Gibson.

Robert H. Hall built a system in Tulsa that connected 80 subscribers in 1899. Hall sold his system in 1903 to the Vinita-based Indian Territory Telephone Company, which was bought by Pioneer Company on July 8, 1904. Pioneer is considered the forerunner of Southwestern Bell Telephone Company. (Note: The Arkansas Valley Telephone Company began connecting Oklahoma towns in 1897. Its name changed to the Pioneer Telephone Company in 1902, and to the Pioneer Telephone and Telegraph Companyin 1904. Pioneer controlled twenty-five Oklahoma exchanges after mergers with Shawnee's Long Distance Telephone Company and the North American Telephone and Telegraph Company of Muskogee, In 1905 Pioneer purchased the Missouri and Kansas Telephone Company and became part of the national Bell System.)

Hall's business was a manually operated switchboard in an office on the second floor of a building at the northwest corner of First Street and Main. Lines to and from the switch board ran from the board through a window to a telephone pole outside the building.

After Pioneer bought the system, the main office and switchboard moved to the second floor of the Bynum Building at the northwest corner of Second Street and Main. By 1906, the Pioneer system served 280 telephones. In 1924, Tulsans had 18,726 telephones, increasing to 41,471 by 1930.
