= Canute Service Station =

- U.S. National Register of Historic Places
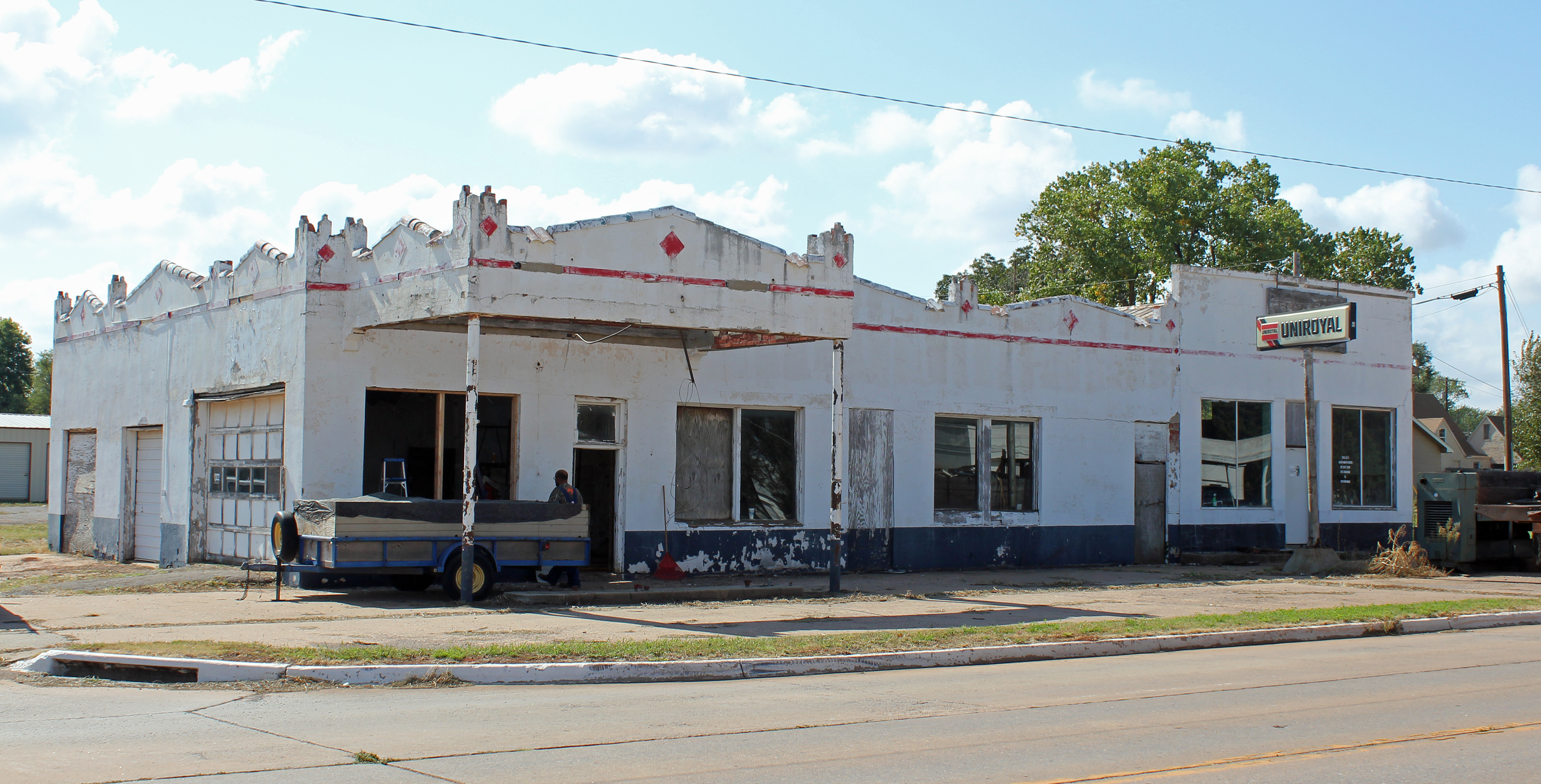
- The station in 2015.

- Location within Oklahoma Location within the United States
- Location: Jct. of Main St. and US 66, SW corner, Canute, Oklahoma
- Coordinates: 35°25′18″N 99°16′49″W
- Area: less than one acre
- Architectural style: Pueblo Deco
- MPS: Route 66 in Oklahoma MPS
- NRHP reference No.: 94001611
- Added to NRHP: February 9, 1995

The Canute Service Station is a historic service station located along former U.S. Route 66 in Canute, Oklahoma. The service station was built in two sections; the western section opened in 1936 as a roadhouse, while the service station itself was added in 1939. The station was designed in the Pueblo Deco style, an architectural style which blended elements of the Art Deco and Pueblo Revival styles. The Pueblo Deco style was most popular in the Southwest, particularly among businesses on Route 66 looking to attract westbound travelers. The service station's Pueblo Deco elements include its stucco exterior, its castellated parapet decorated with tile diamonds, and its red tile roof.

The service station was added to the National Register of Historic Places on February 9, 1995.
