= Canute, Oklahoma =

- Town
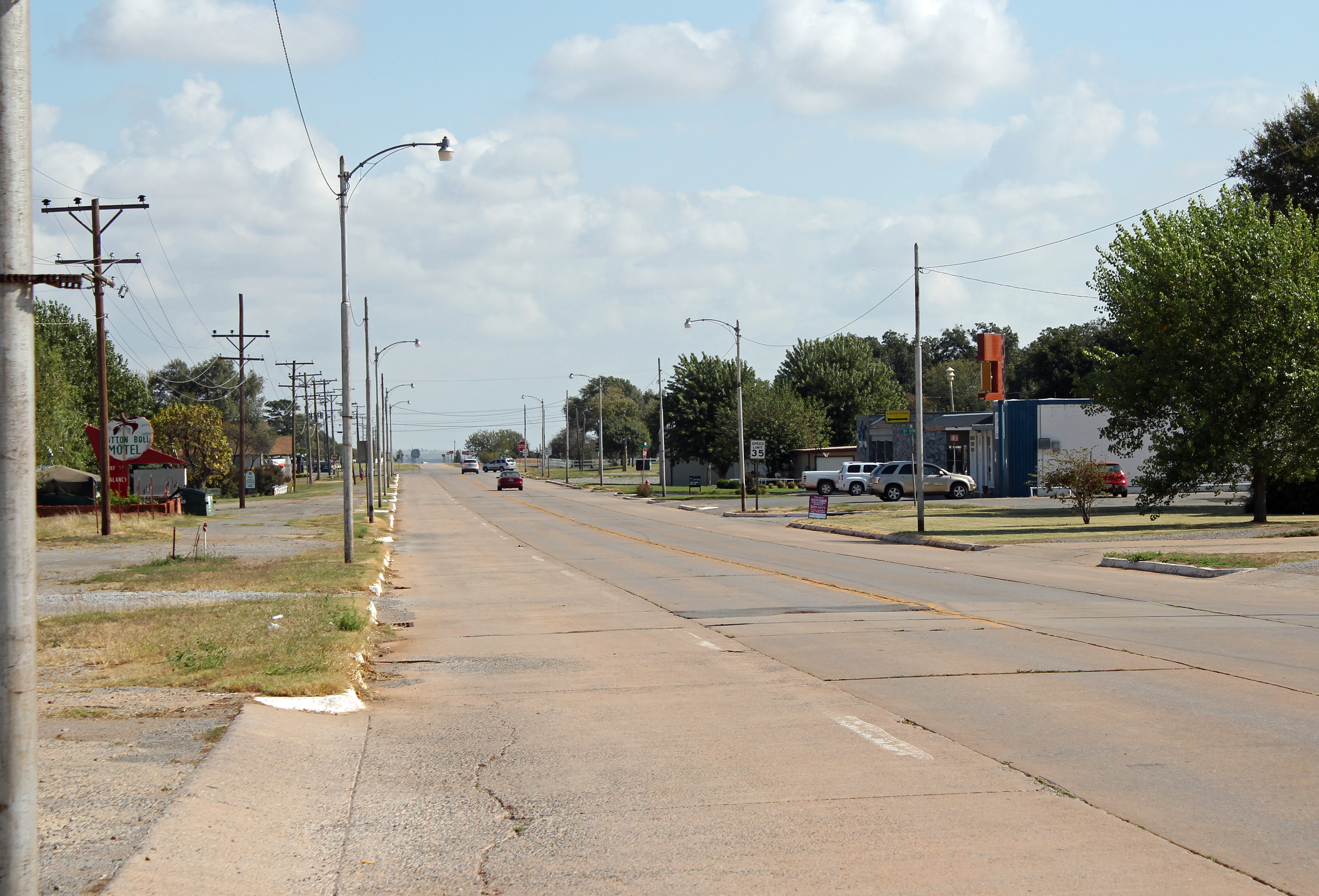
- Old U.S. Highway 66 in Canute.

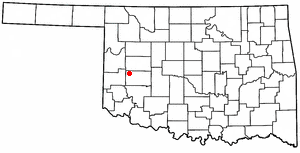
- Location of Canute, Oklahoma
- Coordinates: 35°25′19″N 99°16′41″W
- Country: United States
- State: Oklahoma
- County: Washita

Area
  - Total: 0.63 sq mi (1.63 km^{2})
  - Land: 0.63 sq mi (1.63 km^{2})
  - Water: 0 sq mi (0.00 km^{2})
- Elevation: 1,887 ft (575 m)

Population (2020)
  - Total: 494
  - Density: 782.6/sq mi (302.18/km^{2})
- Time zone: UTC-6 (Central (CST))
  - Summer (DST): UTC-5 (CDT)
- ZIP code: 73626
- Area code: 580
- FIPS code: 40-11650
- GNIS feature ID: 2413161

Canute is a town in Washita County, Oklahoma, United States. As of the 2020 census, Canute had a population of 494.

== History ==
Canute was established in the early 1900s and is located on the now-defunct Rock Island Railroad. Following the advent of the automobile, Canute became a popular stop along U.S. Route 66 and a large number of tourist businesses were established, including gasoline service stations, motels and restaurants. However, when Interstate 40 bypassed the small village to the north in May 1970 and received only one exit from the freeway, the local economy went into a decline due to the bypass and the concurrent closure of nearby Clinton-Sherman Air Force Base at Burns Flat, leading most of those businesses to shut down. Today, Canute businesses include a bank and auto repair shop on Route 66, along with a gas station/convenience store. Former Oklahoma governor David Walters was born in Canute.

== Geography ==
According to the United States Census Bureau, the town has a total area of 0.6 square miles (1.6 km^{2}), all land.

=== Climate ===
Climate data for Canute, Oklahoma
Month	Jan	Feb	Mar	Apr	May	Jun	Jul	Aug	Sep	Oct	Nov	Dec	Year
Mean daily maximum °F (°C)	48.9 (9.4)	54.3 (12.4)	63.8 (17.7)	74.1 (23.4)	81.5 (27.5)	89.5 (31.9)	94.8 (34.9)	93.1 (33.9)	85 (29)	74.9 (23.8)	60.8 (16.0)	50.5 (10.3)	72.6 (22.6)
Mean daily minimum °F (°C)	23.6 (−4.7)	27.9 (−2.3)	36.3 (2.4)	46.5 (8.1)	55.7 (13.2)	64.5 (18.1)	68.9 (20.5)	67.1 (19.5)	59.5 (15.3)	48.1 (8.9)	36.4 (2.4)	26.8 (−2.9)	46.8 (8.2)
Average precipitation inches (mm)	0.7 (18)	1.2 (30)	2 (51)	2.1 (53)	4.6 (120)	3.9 (99)	1.9 (48)	2.9 (74)	3.3 (84)	2 (51)	1.7 (43)	0.8 (20)	26.9 (680)
Source: Weatherbase.com

== Demographics ==
Historical population
Census	Pop.	Note	%±
1930	366		—
1940	374		2.2%
1950	355		−5.1%
1960	370		4.2%
1970	420		13.5%
1980	676		61.0%
1990	542		−19.8%
2000	524		−3.3%
2010	541		3.2%
2020	494		−8.7%
U.S. Decennial Census

=== 2020 census ===
As of the 2020 census, Canute had a population of 494. The median age was 37.8 years. 26.1% of residents were under the age of 18 and 17.4% of residents were 65 years of age or older. For every 100 females there were 85.0 males, and for every 100 females age 18 and over there were 82.5 males age 18 and over.

0.0% of residents lived in urban areas, while 100.0% lived in rural areas.

There were 217 households in Canute, of which 34.6% had children under the age of 18 living in them. Of all households, 44.7% were married-couple households, 16.1% were households with a male householder and no spouse or partner present, and 30.9% were households with a female householder and no spouse or partner present. About 30.8% of all households were made up of individuals and 17.5% had someone living alone who was 65 years of age or older.

There were 239 housing units, of which 9.2% were vacant. The homeowner vacancy rate was 1.7% and the rental vacancy rate was 12.5%.

Racial composition as of the 2020 census
Race	Number	Percent
White	415	84.0%
Black or African American	5	1.0%
American Indian and Alaska Native	15	3.0%
Asian	1	0.2%
Native Hawaiian and Other Pacific Islander	0	0.0%
Some other race	8	1.6%
Two or more races	50	10.1%
Hispanic or Latino (of any race)	51	10.3%

=== 2000 census ===
As of the census of 2000, there were 524 people, 214 households, and 145 families residing in the town. The population density was 854.2 inhabitants per square mile (329.8/km^{2}). There were 242 housing units at an average density of 394.5 per square mile (152.3/km^{2}). The racial makeup of the town was 88.36% White, 0.57% African American, 1.91% Native American, 0.19% Asian, 7.25% from other races, and 1.72% from two or more races. Hispanic or Latino of any race were 7.63% of the population.

There were 214 households, out of which 29.4% had children under the age of 18 living with them, 54.7% were married couples living together, 9.3% had a female householder with no husband present, and 31.8% were non-families. 28.0% of all households were made up of individuals, and 14.5% had someone living alone who was 65 years of age or older. The average household size was 2.45 and the average family size was 3.01.

In the town, the population was spread out, with 24.2% under the age of 18, 12.2% from 18 to 24, 25.4% from 25 to 44, 21.0% from 45 to 64, and 17.2% who were 65 years of age or older. The median age was 38 years. For every 100 females, there were 97.7 males. For every 100 females age 18 and over, there were 90.0 males.

The median income for a household in the town was $32,321, and the median income for a family was $38,036. Males had a median income of $26,406 versus $15,500 for females. The per capita income for the town was $20,283. About 13.7% of families and 15.6% of the population were below the poverty line, including 16.7% of those under age 18 and 22.5% of those age 65 or over.

== Canute Public Schools ==
Canute Elementary School is located at Third and Walk Street. The elementary serves students in Pre-K through 6th grade with an average of 32 students per class.

Canute Junior High and High School is located at 506 Third Street. The junior high serves students in 7th through 9th grades with 34 students per class on average. The high school serves students in 10th grade through 12th grade with an average of 30 students per class.
