= New Cordell, Oklahoma =

- City
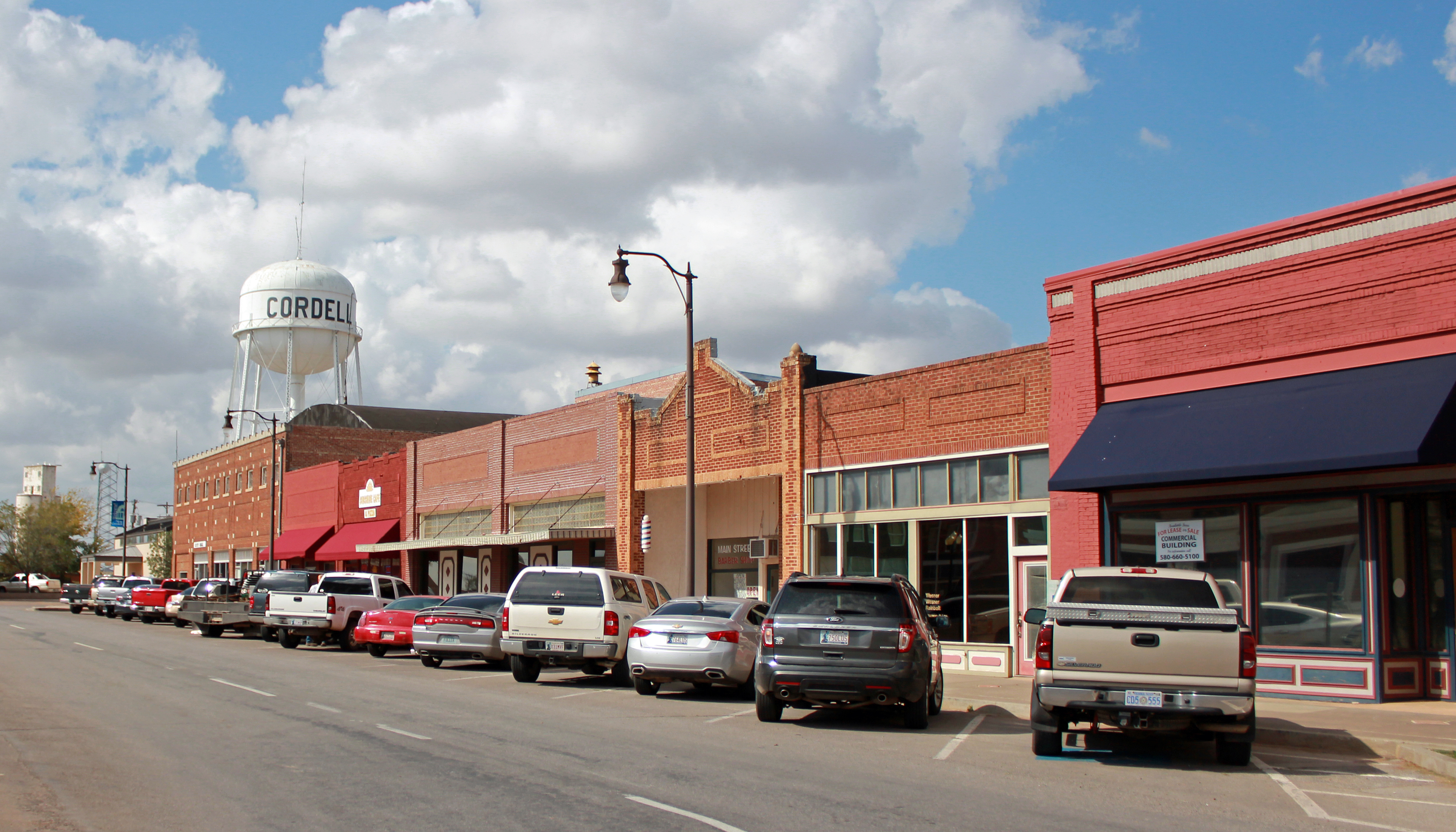

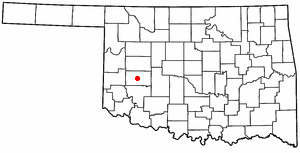
- Location of New Cordell, Oklahoma
- Coordinates: 35°17′48″N 98°59′02″W
- Country: United States
- State: Oklahoma
- County: Washita
- Established: April 20, 1892

Government
  - Mayor: Bob Plummer

Area
  - Total: 2.25 sq mi (5.82 km^{2})
  - Land: 2.25 sq mi (5.82 km^{2})
  - Water: 0 sq mi (0.00 km^{2})
- Elevation: 1,555 ft (474 m)

Population (2020)
  - Total: 2,775
  - Density: 1,234.1/sq mi (476.47/km^{2})
- Time zone: UTC−6 (Central (CST))
  - Summer (DST): UTC−5 (CDT)
- ZIP code: 73632
- Area code: 580
- FIPS code: 40-51250
- GNIS feature ID: 2411230
- Website: City website

New Cordell is a city in and the county seat of Washita County, Oklahoma, United States. It lies along U.S. Route 183. The population was 2,775 at the time of the 2020 Census. The community was previously established a few miles from the current site, but was moved about 1900. It was named for a U.S. Postal Service employee in Washington D. C., Wayne W. Cordell. The official name is New Cordell, though it is now commonly called Cordell.

== History ==
Cordell began when H. D. Young opened a general store about 1.5 miles east of the present town, shortly after the Cheyenne and Arapaho lands were opened for non-Indian settlement in 1892. A post office named Cordell was established in the same year in Young's store. In 1897, A. J. Johnson and J. C. Harrell convinced Young to move his store to the present site, where water was more plentiful and of better quality than in Old Cordell. The new location became known as New Cordell. In 1900, Washita County residents voted to move the county seat from the town of Cloud Chief to New Cordell. The move was challenged in the court as illegal, because only the territorial legislature could authorize such an action. In 1904, the Oklahoma Territorial Supreme Court ruled that the county seat must return to Cloud Chief. A Cordell attorney, Sam Massengale, traveled to Washington, where he lobbied for a bill to make Cordell the official county seat. The bill passed the U. S. Congress in 1906.

The county courthouse was destroyed by a fire in 1909. It was rebuilt by 1911 by the same architect who designed the Oklahoma State Capitol. Governor George Nigh called it, "...godfather of all courthouses in the state of Oklahoma." The Washita County Courthouse is listed on the National Register of Historic Places. In 1911, the Carnegie Foundation approved a grant to construct what became known as the Cordell Carnegie Community Library.

== Geography ==
According to the United States Census Bureau, the city has a total area of 2.5 square miles (6.5 km^{2}), all land. The city is located approximately in the center of the county.

== Climate ==
Like most of Oklahoma, New Cordell has a humid subtropical climate (Köppen Cfa), although it is nearly dry enough to qualify as a cool semi-arid climate (BSk). Summers are hot to sweltering, and typically dry, whilst winters average cool by afternoon and freezing by morning but show extreme variation from very warm due to descending chinook winds to frigid periods dominated by Arctic air masses. The heaviest precipitation occurs in the spring from thunderstorms, although occasionally remnant rain depressions in summer and fall provide very heavy rain.

Climate data for New Cordell, Oklahoma
Month	Jan	Feb	Mar	Apr	May	Jun	Jul	Aug	Sep	Oct	Nov	Dec	Year
Record high °F (°C)	84 (29)	85 (29)	95 (35)	99 (37)	106 (41)	114 (46)	113 (45)	115 (46)	109 (43)	100 (38)	89 (32)	90 (32)	115 (46)
Mean daily maximum °F (°C)	51 (11)	56 (13)	64 (18)	74 (23)	82 (28)	91 (33)	96 (36)	97 (36)	89 (32)	77 (25)	63 (17)	54 (12)	75 (24)
Mean daily minimum °F (°C)	26 (−3)	30 (−1)	36 (2)	47 (8)	57 (14)	67 (19)	70 (21)	70 (21)	61 (16)	50 (10)	36 (2)	30 (−1)	48 (9)
Record low °F (°C)	−12 (−24)	−2 (−19)	22 (−6)	32 (0)	45 (7)	55 (13)	52 (11)	36 (2)	26 (−3)	10 (−12)	—	—	−12 (−24)
Average precipitation inches (mm)	1.0 (25)	1.0 (25)	1.5 (38)	2.8 (71)	4.5 (110)	3.7 (94)	2.5 (64)	1.6 (41)	2.0 (51)	2.5 (64)	0.9 (23)	1.1 (28)	25.1 (634)
Average precipitation days	2.7	2.7	3.8	5.9	7.0	6.4	5.0	3.6	3.6	4.4	2.1	3.0	50.2
Source 1: weather.com
Source 2: Weatherbase.com

== Demographics ==
Historical population
Census	Pop.	Note	%±
1910	1,950		—
1920	1,855		−4.9%
1930	2,936		58.3%
1940	2,776		−5.4%
1950	2,920		5.2%
1960	3,589		22.9%
1970	3,261		−9.1%
1980	3,301		1.2%
1990	2,903		−12.1%
2000	2,867		−1.2%
2010	2,915		1.7%
2020	2,775		−4.8%
U.S. Decennial Census

=== 2020 census ===
As of the 2020 census, New Cordell had a population of 2,775. The median age was 39.9 years, with 24.7% of residents under the age of 18 and 19.7% aged 65 years or older. For every 100 females there were 92.0 males, and for every 100 females age 18 and over there were 89.6 males.

There were 1,123 households in New Cordell, of which 32.7% had children under the age of 18 living in them. Of all households, 47.7% were married-couple households, 17.5% were households with a male householder and no spouse or partner present, and 28.8% were households with a female householder and no spouse or partner present. About 30.7% of all households were made up of individuals and 15.7% had someone living alone who was 65 years of age or older.

There were 1,367 housing units, of which 17.8% were vacant. Among occupied housing units, 67.4% were owner-occupied and 32.6% were renter-occupied. The homeowner vacancy rate was 5.1% and the rental vacancy rate was 16.7%.

0% of residents lived in urban areas, while 100.0% lived in rural areas.

Racial composition as of the 2020 census
Race	Percent
White	85.8%
Black or African American	0.8%
American Indian and Alaska Native	3.2%
Asian	<0.1%
Native Hawaiian and Other Pacific Islander	0%
Some other race	1.6%
Two or more races	8.6%
Hispanic or Latino (of any race)	7.2%

=== 2000 census ===
As of the census of 2000, there were 2,867 people, 1,192 households, and 816 families residing in the city. The population density was 1,132.3 inhabitants per square mile (437.2/km^{2}). There were 1,427 housing units at an average density of 563.6 per square mile (217.6/km^{2}). The racial makeup of the city was 95.33% White, 0.21% African American, 2.09% Native American, 0.17% Asian, 0.94% from other races, and 1.26% from two or more races. Hispanic or Latino of any race were 2.62% of the population.

There were 1,192 households, out of which 32.3% had children under the age of 18 living with them, 55.2% were married couples living together, 10.1% had a female householder with no husband present, and 31.5% were non-families. 28.4% of all households were made up of individuals, and 14.6% had someone living alone who was 65 years of age or older. The average household size was 2.39 and the average family size was 2.92.

In the city, the population was spread out, with 25.9% under the age of 18, 7.5% from 18 to 24, 26.1% from 25 to 44, 22.1% from 45 to 64, and 18.4% who were 65 years of age or older. The median age was 39 years. For every 100 females, there were 90.9 males. For every 100 females age 18 and over, there were 86.4 males.

The median income for a household in the city was $28,053, and the median income for a family was $34,519. Males had a median income of $24,531 versus $18,173 for females. The per capita income for the city was $15,509. About 15.4% of families and 17.3% of the population were below the poverty line, including 25.9% of those under age 18 and 9.2% of those age 65 or over.

== Education ==
- Cordell Public Schools
- Western Technology Center
- Southwestern Oklahoma State University

== Notable people ==
- Batsell Barrett Baxter, preacher and writer
- Betty Ann Elliott, petroleum geologist
- Glenn English, politician
- George Grantham, American drummer and vocalist best known for his work with pioneering country rock band Poco
- Yvonne Kauger, Oklahoma Supreme Court associate justice
- Kelly Mantle, actor, singer-songwriter, comedian, musician, drag queen, and reality television personality
