= Oaklawn Cemetery (Tulsa) =

Cemetery in Tulsa, Oklahoma

Coordinates: 36°08′56″N 95°58′40″W

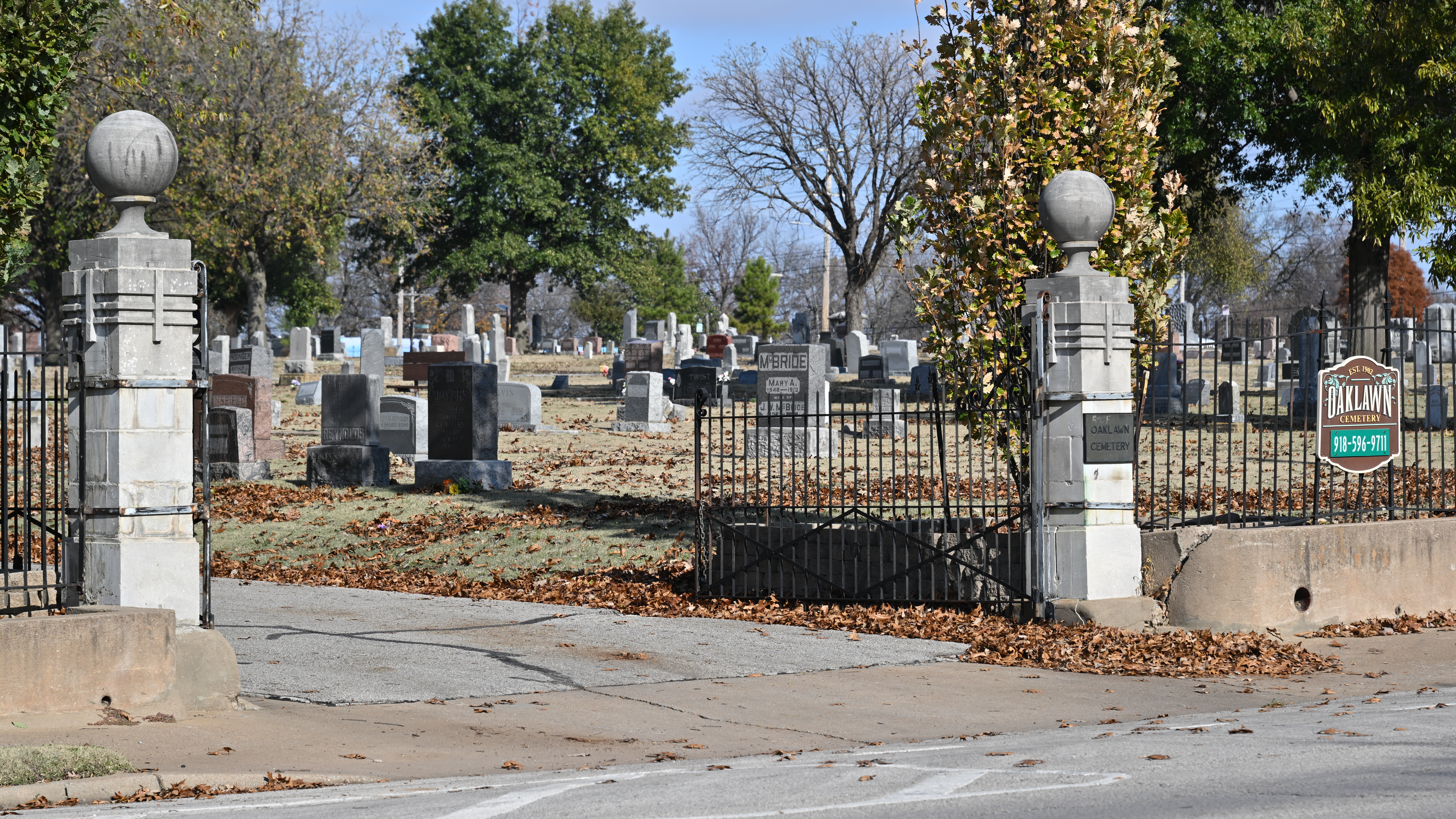
Oaklawn Cemetery entrance, Tulsa, OK

Oaklawn Cemetery is the oldest existing cemetery in Tulsa, Oklahoma.

To the north of the cemetery is 8th street, to the east is Peoria Avenue, to the south is 11th Street and to the west is highway 75.

== History ==
Oaklawn cemetery was founded in 1882, Tulsa took over the cemetery in 1906.

== Mass graves ==
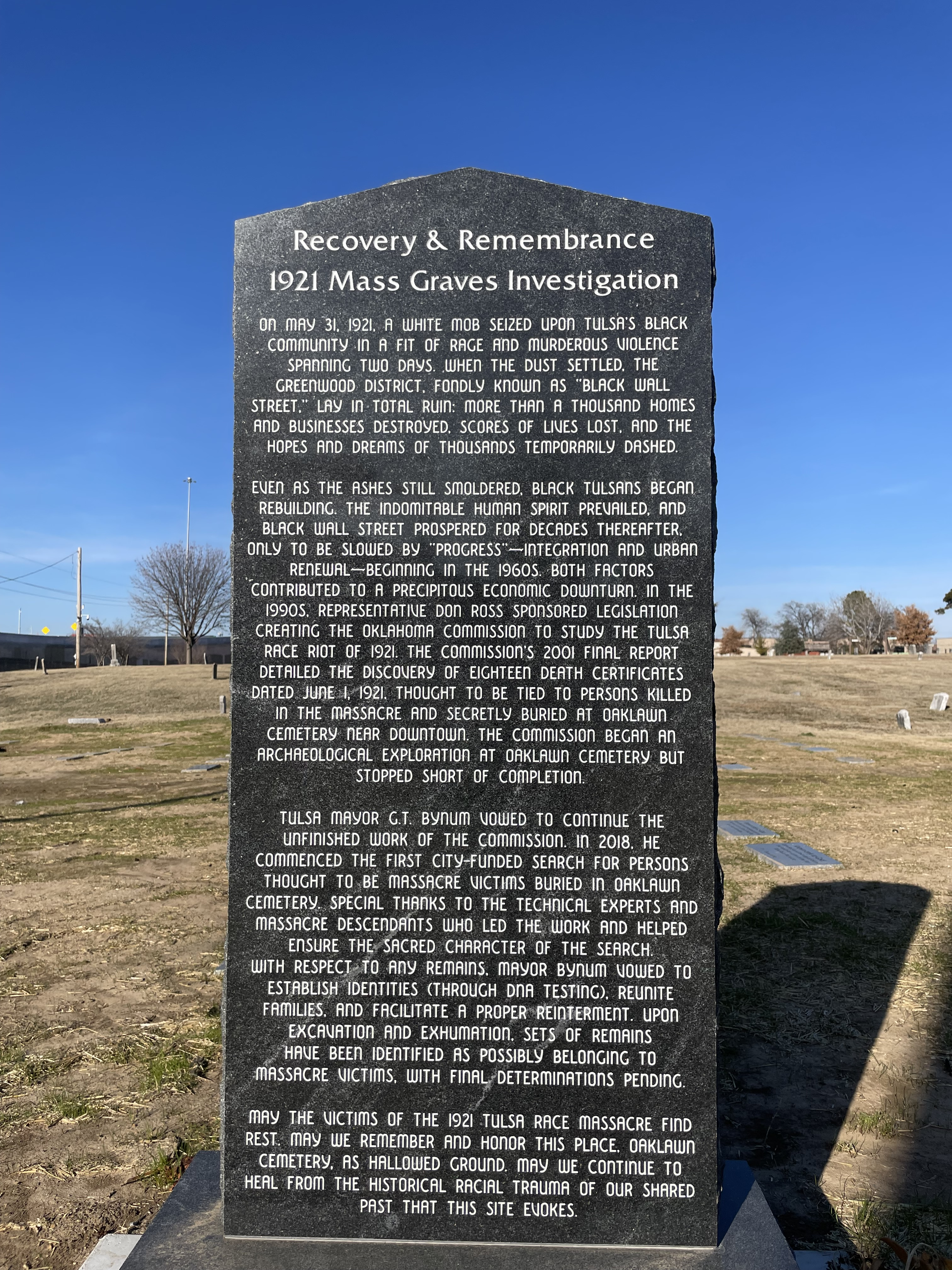
Tulsa Race Massacre marker

Multiple unmarked graves have been exhumed in search for victims of the Tulsa Race Massacre. The two identified victims are C. L. Daniel and James Goings. On November 12, 2024, a memorial service was held at Oaklawn Cemetery to recognize those whose remains were reinterred. A monument was also dedicated for those who have been identified through DNA research and genealogical records.
