= Tulsa Reparations Coalition =

Government commission

The Oklahoma Commission to Study the Tulsa Race Riot of 1921, also called the 1921 Race Riot Commission, was authorized in 1997 by the Oklahoma State Legislature. Its purpose was to research the events of the Tulsa race massacre of 1921. Its report was submitted on February 28, 2001. The Tulsa Reparations Coalition, sponsored by the Center for Racial Justice, Inc. was formed April 7, 2001, to obtain restitution for the damages suffered by Tulsa's Black community, as recommended by the Oklahoma Commission on February 21, 2001.

After reporting back to the Oklahoma State Legislature, the final report recommended five separate reparations to the survivors, descendants and to the community of Greenwood where the massacre took place.

- Direct payment of reparations to survivors of the 1921 Tulsa race massacre
- Direct payment of reparations to descendants of the survivors of the Tulsa race massacre
- A scholarship fund available to students affected by the Tulsa race massacre
- Establishment of an economic development enterprise zone in the historic area of the Greenwood District
- A memorial for the reburial of the remains of the victims of the Tulsa race massacre

The Commission conducted three and a half years of research, speaking with survivors of the massacre and sifting through hospital and autopsy reports. The final report of the Commission discussed the events of May 31 and June 1, 1921; the destruction of property; the social and economic dislocation and devastation of the black community; and the number of casualties the Commission confirmed. In brief,

Through the night of May 31, and into the morning of June 1, whites virtually destroyed the Greenwood section. There were an undetermined number of deaths, both black and white, with estimates ranging from the official count of 36 to approximately 300. Over 1,000 residences were burned and another 400 looted. The business district of Greenwood was totally destroyed and probably accounts for much of the $4 million in claims filed against the city in 1921.

There had been much speculation as to the actual number of deaths. There were statements that many hundreds of deaths occurred during the massacre, far more than were reported. Eyewitnesses said that these bodies were of black men and were located in mass unmarked graves. In contrast, based on contemporary autopsy reports and death certificates, the Commission confirmed 26 black males, 13 white males, and over 100 estimated dead. The final report also includes the available data about the bodies, including their cause of death, wounds, etc. They did not dismiss the possibility of mass graves, and found at least one potential location based on an eyewitness report and a geophysical search. However, obtaining conclusive evidence required archeological work, which the investigators were not authorized to perform.

== See also ==
- Tulsa race massacre
- Greenwood, Tulsa, Oklahoma
- Rosewood Massacre
- Reparation (legal)
- Justice
