= Curtiss-Southwest Field =

Curtiss-Southwest Field was an airport outside Tulsa, Oklahoma. It was operated by the Curtiss Southwest Airline Company, founded in 1919, which used the airport to support its efforts to sell airplanes to private businesses, notably in the expanding petroleum industry. One of Curtiss-Southwest's planes was used for an August 14, 1919 shipment of insecticide from Tulsa to Kansas City, promoted as the first interstate freight shipment by air. During the Tulsa race massacre, this airport was the origin of planes that attacked Black Americans in Tulsa.
