= Mary Jones Parrish =

African-American journalist (1892–1972)

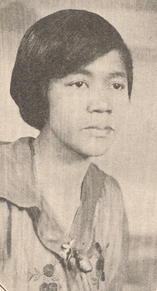
- Born: 1892
- Died: 1972 (aged 79–80)
- Occupations: Typist, educator and journalist
- Employer: Y.M.C.A
- Known for: Survivor of the Tulsa race massacre
- Notable work: Events of the Tulsa disaster, 1922

Mary Elizabeth Jones Parrish (1892–1972) was an African American journalist, typist and survivor of the 1921 Tulsa race massacre. Parrish kept a record of the events of the race riot and gathered eyewitness accounts from survivors. Her book, Events of the Tulsa Disaster is one of the most comprehensive records of the events that took place during the two-day-long white supremacist terrorist massacre.

== Biography ==
Mary Elizabeth Jones Parrish was born in 1892 in Yazoo City, Mississippi. She later attended the Rochester Business Institute in Rochester, New York where she learned typing and shorthand.

In 1918, Jones Parrish first visited Tulsa, Oklahoma from Rochester to visit a brother who was living in the city. She was excited by the opportunities to be had the city, and recalled learning about the prosperity in Tulsa since she was a child. After returning to Rochester for a brief time to visit her dying mother, she relocated to Tulsa to join the thriving community of black businesses located on "Black Wall Street". In 1919, Jones Parrish established a Natural Education school to teach typing and shorthand, as well as taught classes at the Y.M.C.A. Her classes were conducted within the Woods building, in the heart of Tulsa's Greenwood District.

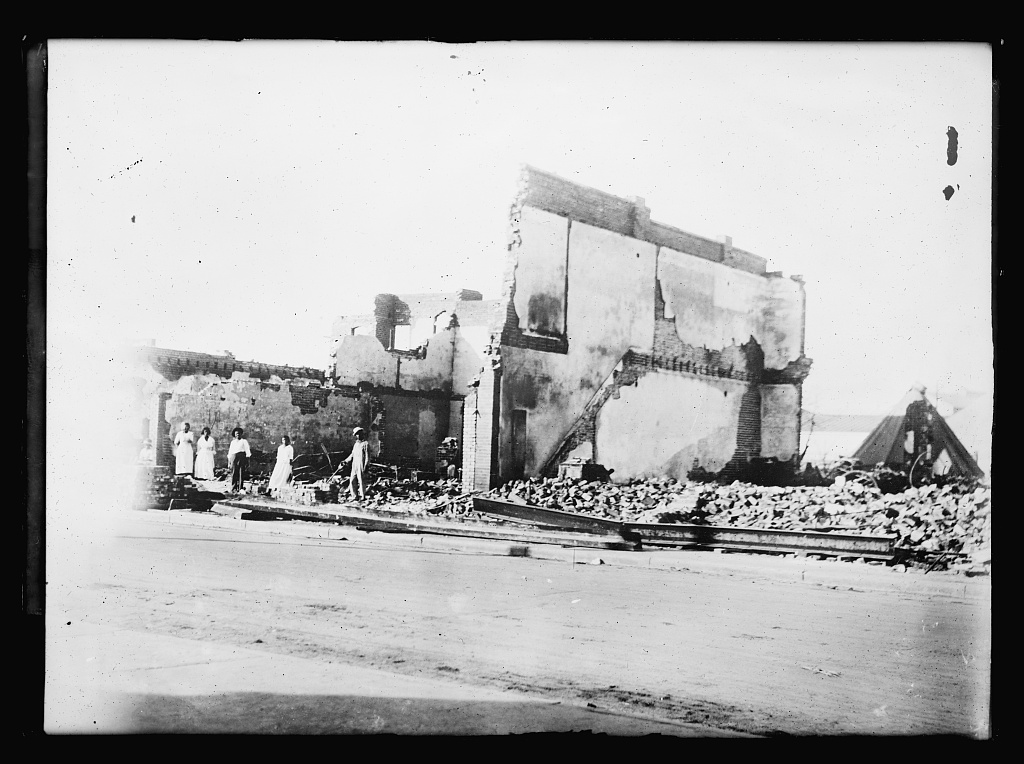
The Woods Building, where Jones Parrish had her typing school, after the riot

=== Tulsa race massacre ===
On the evening of May 31, 1921, Parrish finished a typewriting class with her students at 9pm. She then turned her attention to a book when her daughter Florence Mary alerted her that men were outside with guns. After watching the violence from their window for a time, the pair fled what would become one of the worst incidents of racial violence in American history.

After the riot, Jones Parrish remained in Tulsa, taking a job from the Inter-Racial Commission that would later report on the events.

In 1922, Parrish privately published Events of the Tulsa Disaster, which included accounts from survivors and shared her own experience of escaping with Florence Mary. The text would become one of the most comprehensive accounts of the race massacre.

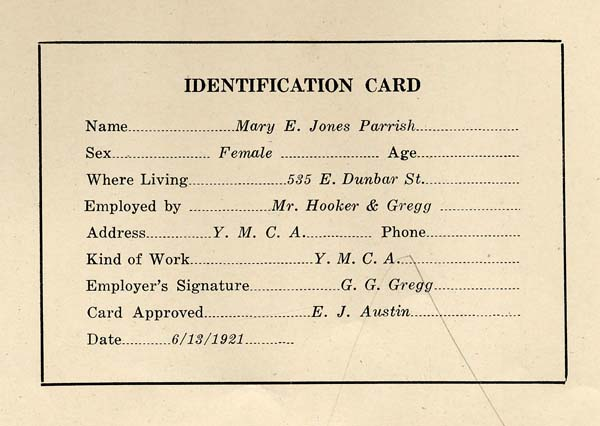
Mary Jones Parrish's identity card used after the Tulsa race massacre.

In the forward to Events of the Tulsa Disaster, Jones Parrish wrote,

It is my sincere hope and desire that this will serve the purpose of Uncle Tom's Cabin, that is, that it will serve to open the eyes of the thinking people of America to the impending danger of letting such conditions exist and remain in the "Land of the Free and the Home of the Brave" and to pay a tribute to the martyrs of the Tulsa Disaster and massacre.

Jones Parrish died in 1972.

=== Legacy ===
Despite Jones Parrish's contribution to the understanding of the Tulsa race massacre and its aftermath, the story of Jones Parrish herself was little remembered in the decades after the riot.

Annelise Bruner, Jones Parrish's great-granddaughter later worked with Trinity University Press to commemorate Jones Parrish's work. In May 2021, a century on from the riot, Parrish's account of the Tulsa race massacre was reprinted for a new generation, The Nation Must Awake: My Witness to the Tulsa Race Massacre of 1921.
