= C. L. Daniel =

American WWI veteran (1896–1921)

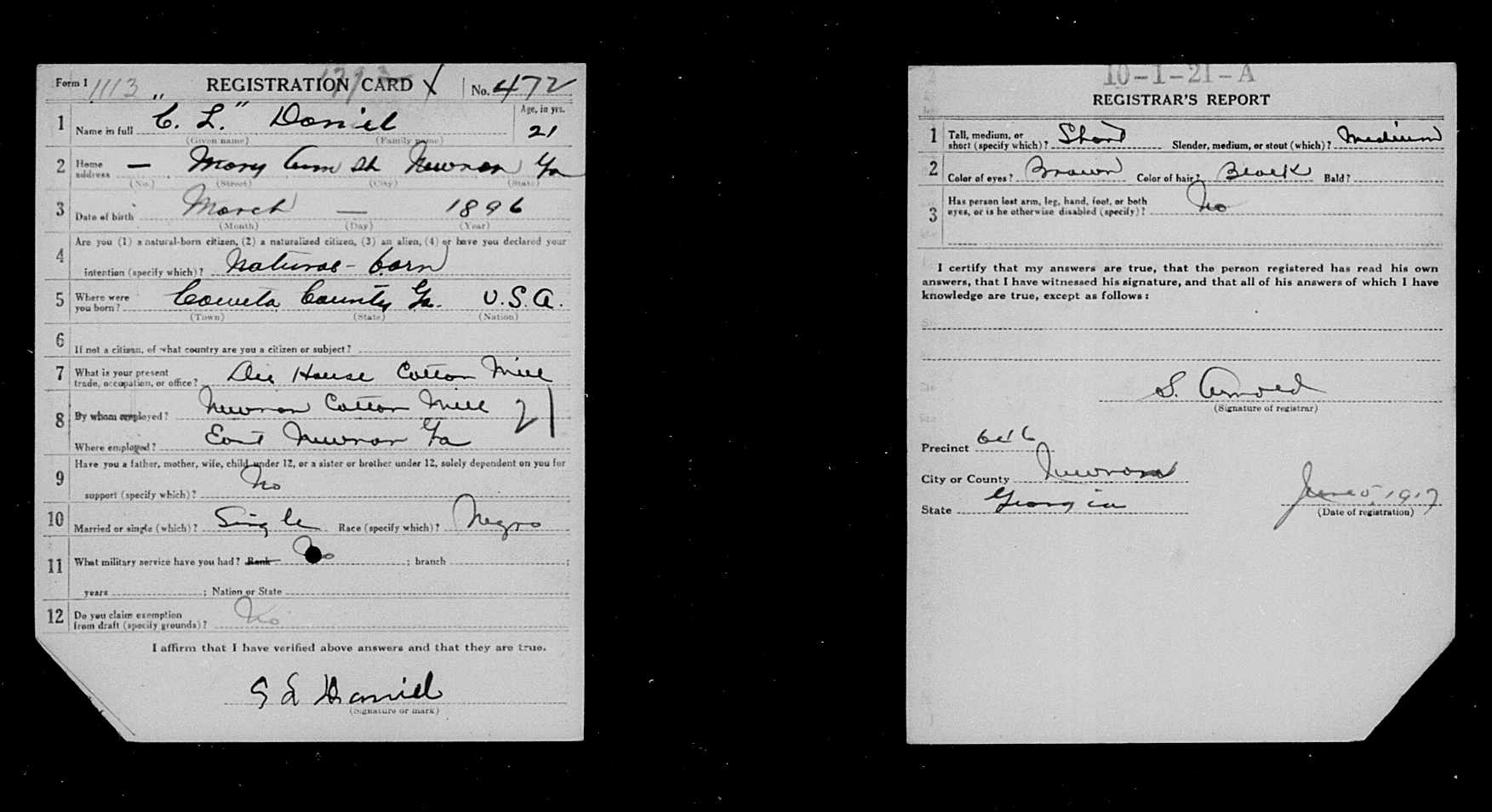
- C. L. Daniel in the WWI draft registration
- Born: July 14, 1896; Newnan, Georgia, U.S.
- Died: May 31, 1921; Tulsa, Oklahoma, U.S.
- Cause of death: Tulsa Race Massacre
- Body discovered: July 12, 2024
- Military career
- Allegiance: United States
- Branch: Army
- Service years: 1918-1919
- Conflicts: World War I

C. L. Daniel was an American World War I veteran known for being the first victim of the Tulsa Race Massacre identified from remains exhumed from mass graves in Tulsa.

== Biography ==
C. L. Daniel was born and raised in Newnan, Georgia to Thomas Daniel and Amanda Merriweather. His father died before 1910. He was drafted into the United States Army in 1918 during World War I and served until 1919. He was stationed at Camp Gordon in Chamblee, Georgia, during his military tenure with the 47th Company, 12th Training Battalion, and the 406th Rescue Labor Battalion, Company B. According to an anthropologist at the University of Florida, he spent 19 days in a base hospital for a possible leg injury.

=== Death and identification ===
After the war, Daniel traveled across the United States. He was on his way home to Georgia from Utah when he was killed in the Tulsa Race Massacre. In 2020, the city of Tulsa began exhuming suspected mass graves related to the massacre. In July 2024, Daniel was the first victim of the massacre exhumed from the graves positively identified. The city offered to help rebury Daniel according to his family's wishes. A memorial service was held in which the mayor of Tulsa G.T. Bynum eulogized Daniel and spoke of his relationship to his bereaved mother. A letter from his family was read: "Today represents more than a memorial for C.L. Daniel and those still resting in unidentified graves; it is a long-waited acknowledgement of the lives impacted by the massacre."
