= Tulsa race massacre =

1921 mass violence in Oklahoma, US

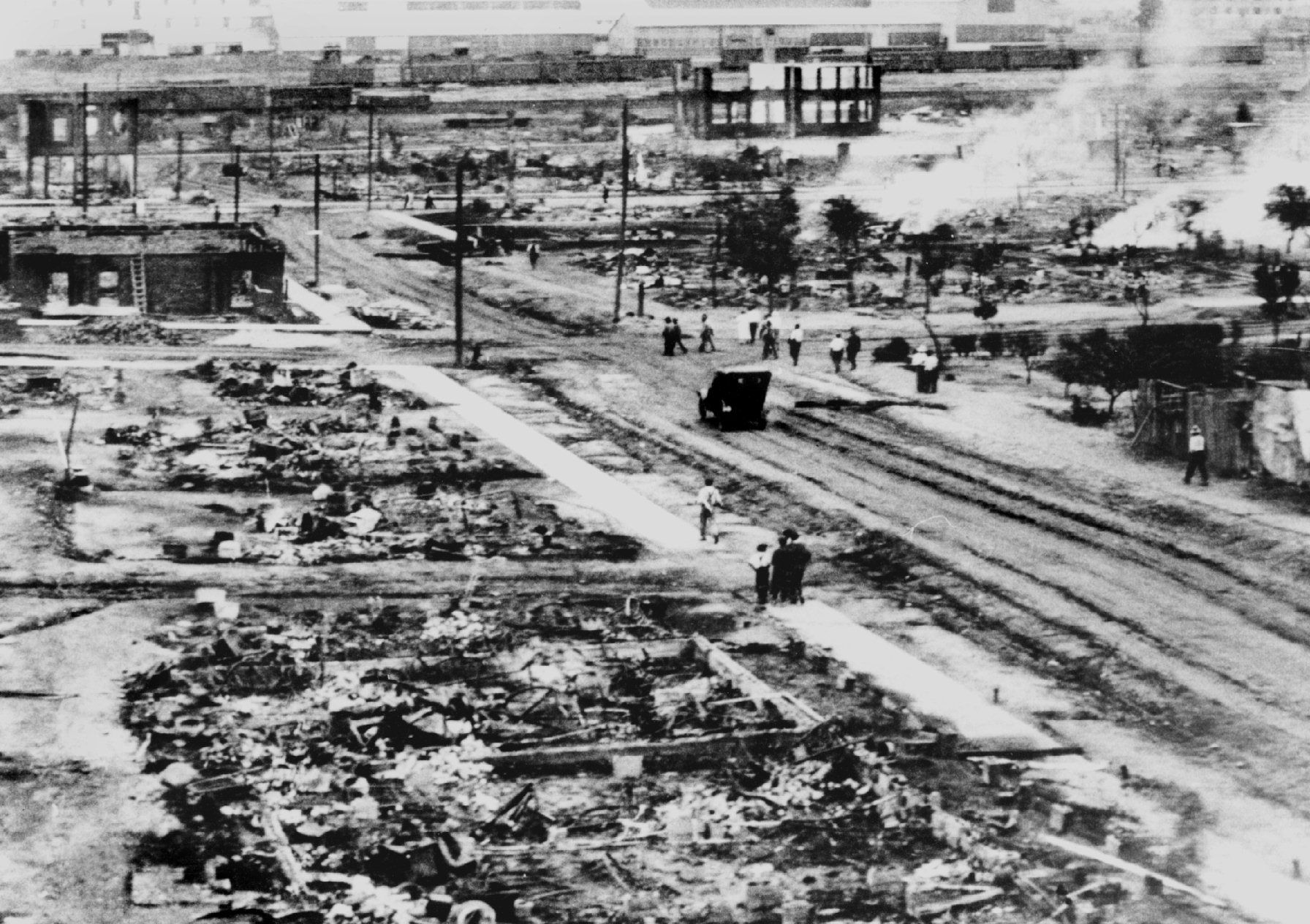
- Homes and businesses burned in Greenwood, June 1, 1921
- Location: 36°09′35″N 95°59′09″W; Greenwood District, Tulsa, Oklahoma, U.S.
- Date: May 31 – June 1, 1921
- Target: Black residents, their homes, businesses, churches, schools, and municipal buildings
- Attack type: White supremacist terrorism; race riots; racial violence; lynching; pogrom; arson; mass murder; ethnic cleansing
- Weapons: Guns, explosives, fire
- Deaths: Total number of fatalities unknown Up to 300 deaths estimated
- Injuries: 800+ 232 serious injuries Exact number unknown
- Perpetrator: White mob
- Motive: Anti-Black racism

The Tulsa race massacre was a two-day-long terrorist massacre perpetrated by white supremacists that took place in the Greenwood District of Tulsa, Oklahoma, United States, between May 31 and June 1, 1921. Mobs of white residents, some of whom had been armed and appointed as deputies by city government officials, attacked black residents and their homes and businesses. The attackers burned and destroyed more than 35 square blocks of the neighborhood—at the time, one of the wealthiest black communities in the United States, colloquially known as "Black Wall Street." The event is considered one of the worst incidents of racial violence in American history.

More than 800 people were admitted to hospitals, and as many as 6,000 black residents of Tulsa were interned, many of them for several days. The Oklahoma Bureau of Vital Statistics officially recorded that 36 people died. In 2001, the Tulsa Reparations Coalition examination of events identified 39 people dead (26 black and 13 white), based on contemporary autopsy reports, death certificates, and other records. The commission reported estimates ranging from 39 people to around 300 people dead.

The massacre began during Memorial Day weekend after 19-year-old Dick Rowland, a black shoeshiner, was accused of assaulting Sarah Page, a white 21-year-old elevator operator in the nearby Drexel Building. He was arrested and rumors spread that he was to be lynched. Several hundred white residents assembled outside the courthouse, appearing to have the makings of a lynch mob. A group of approximately 50–60 black men, armed with rifles and shotguns, arrived at the jail to support the sheriff and his deputies in defending Rowland from the mob. Having seen the armed black men, some of the whites who had been at the courthouse went home for their own guns. There are conflicting reports about the exact time and nature of the incident, or incidents, that immediately precipitated the massacre.

According to the 2001 Commission, "As the black men were leaving, a white man attempted to disarm a tall, African American World War I veteran. A struggle ensued, and a shot rang out." Then, according to the sheriff, "all hell broke loose." The two groups shot at each other until midnight when the group of black men was greatly outnumbered and forced to retreat to Greenwood. At the end of the exchange of gunfire, 12 people were dead, 10 white and 2 black. Alternatively, another eyewitness account was that the shooting began "down the street from the Courthouse" when black business owners came to the defense of a lone black man being attacked by a group of around six white men. It is possible that the eyewitness did not recognize the fact that this incident was occurring as a part of a rolling gunfight that was already underway.

As news of the violence spread throughout the city, mob violence exploded. White rioters invaded Greenwood that night and the next morning, killing men and burning and looting stores and homes. Around noon on June 1, the Oklahoma National Guard imposed martial law, ending the massacre. About 10,000 black people were left homeless, and the cost of the property damage amounted to more than $1.5 million in real estate and $750,000 in personal property (equivalent to $40.61 million in 2025). By the end of 1922, most of the residents' homes had been rebuilt, but the city and real estate companies refused to compensate them. Many survivors left Tulsa.

The massacre was largely omitted from local, state, and national histories for years. In 1997, a bipartisan group in the state legislature authorized the formation of the Oklahoma Commission to Study the Tulsa Race Riot of 1921. The commission's final report, published in 2001, was unable to establish that the city had conspired with the racist mob; however it recommended a program of reparations to survivors and their descendants. The state passed legislation to establish scholarships for the descendants of survivors and develop a park in memory of the victims, which was dedicated in 2010. Schools in Oklahoma have been required to teach students about the massacre since 2002, and in 2020, the massacre officially became a part of the Oklahoma school curriculum.

== Background ==
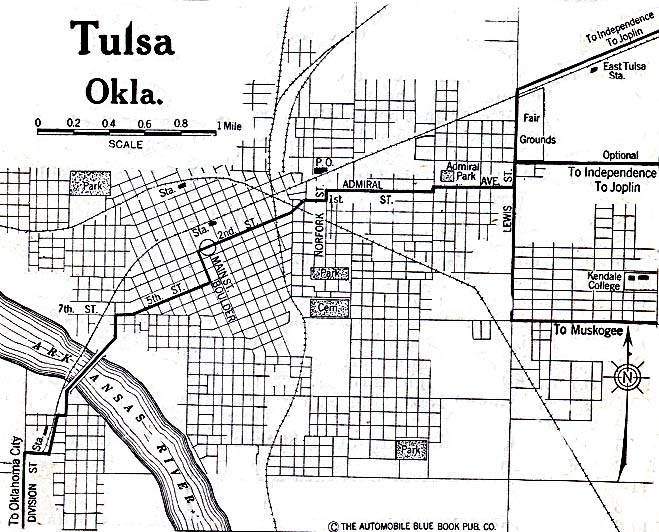
A map of Tulsa in 1920. The Greenwood District was in northern Tulsa.

In 1921, Oklahoma had a racially, socially, and politically tense atmosphere. The territory of northern Oklahoma had been established for the forced resettlement of Native Americans from the southeast, some of whom had owned slaves. The slaves were the first black inhabitants of Indian Territory, having been brought in by their native owners. Other areas had received many settlers from the South whose families had been slaveholders before the Civil War. Oklahoma was admitted as a state on November 16, 1907. The newly created state legislature, which had a large Democratic majority, passed racial segregation laws, commonly known as Jim Crow laws, as its first order of business. The 1907 Oklahoma Constitution did not call for strict segregation; delegates feared that U.S. president Theodore Roosevelt would veto the document if they included such restrictions. Still, the first law passed by the new legislature segregated all rail travel, and voter registration rules effectively disenfranchised non-whites. This meant that they were also barred from either serving on juries or serving in local public offices. These laws were enforced until they were ruled unconstitutional after the passage of the federal Voting Rights Act of 1965. Major cities passed laws that imposed additional restrictions.

On August 4, 1916, Tulsa passed an ordinance that mandated residential segregation by forbidding members of either race from residing on any block where three-quarters or more of the residents were members of the other race. Although the United States Supreme Court declared such an ordinance unconstitutional the following year, Tulsa and many other cities continued to establish and enforce segregation for the next three decades.

Many servicemen returned to Tulsa following the end of the First World War in 1918. As they tried to re-enter the labor force, social tensions and white supremacist sentiment increased in cities where job competition was fierce. An economic slump in Northeastern Oklahoma increased the level of unemployment. The Civil War, which ended in 1865, was still in living memory; civil rights for African Americans were lacking.

The Ku Klux Klan was resurgent (influenced by the popular 1915 film The Birth of a Nation). Since 1915, the Ku Klux Klan had been growing in urban chapters across the country. Its first significant appearance in Oklahoma occurred on August 12, 1921. By the end of 1921, 3,200 of Tulsa's 72,000 residents were Klan members, according to one estimate. In the early 20th century, lynchings were common in Oklahoma as part of a continuing effort to assert and maintain white supremacy. By 1921, at least 31 people, mostly men and boys, had been lynched in the newly formed state; 26 were black.

At the same time, black veterans pushed to have their civil rights enforced, believing that they had earned full citizenship as the result of their military service. In what became known as the "Red Summer" of 1919, industrial cities across the Midwest and Northeast experienced severe race riots in which whites attacked black communities, sometimes with the assistance of local authorities.

As a booming oil city, Tulsa also supported a large number of affluent, educated, and professional African American residents. Greenwood was a district in Tulsa that was organized in 1906 following Booker T. Washington's 1905 tour of Arkansas, Indian Territory, and Oklahoma. It was a namesake of the Greenwood District, which Washington had established as his own district in Tuskegee, Alabama, five years earlier. Greenwood became so prosperous that it came to be known as "the Negro Wall Street" (now commonly referred to as "the Black Wall Street"). Most black people lived together in the district. Black Americans had created their own businesses and services in this enclave, including several grocers, two newspapers, two movie theaters, nightclubs, and numerous churches. Black professionals, including doctors, dentists, lawyers, and clergy, served the community. During his trip to Tulsa in 1905, Washington encouraged the cooperation, economic independence, and excellence being demonstrated there. Greenwood residents selected their own leaders and raised capital there to support economic growth. In the surrounding areas of northeastern Oklahoma, they also enjoyed relative prosperity and participated in the oil boom.

== Monday, May 30 (Memorial Day) ==
=== Encounter in the elevator ===
On May 30, 1921, 19-year-old Dick Rowland, a black shoeshiner who was employed at a Main Street shine parlor, entered the only elevator in the nearby Drexel Building at 319 South Main Street in order to use the top-floor "colored" restroom, which his employer had arranged for use by his black employees. There, he encountered Sarah Page, the 21-year-old white elevator operator who was on duty. Whether—and to what extent—Rowland and Page knew each other has long been a matter of speculation. The two likely knew each other at least by sight because Rowland would have regularly ridden in Page's elevator on his way to and from the restroom. A clerk at Renberg's, a clothing store on the first floor of the Drexel, heard what sounded like a woman's scream and saw a young black man rushing from the building. The clerk went to the elevator and found Page in a distraught state. Thinking that she had been sexually assaulted, he summoned the authorities. Apart from the clerk's interpretation that Rowland had attempted to rape Page, many explanations have been given for the incident, with the most common explanation being that Rowland tripped as he got onto the elevator, and as he tried to catch his fall, he grabbed onto the arm of Page, who then screamed. Others suggested that Rowland and Page had a lover's quarrel.

The 2001 Oklahoma Commission Final Report notes that it was unusual for both Rowland and Page to be working downtown on Memorial Day when most stores and businesses were closed. But it has been speculated that Rowland was there because the shine parlor where he worked may have been open to draw in some of the parade traffic, while Page had been required to work in order to transport Drexel Building employees and their families to choice parade viewing spots on the building's upper floors.

=== Brief investigation ===
Although the police questioned Page, no written account of her statement has been found, but apparently, she told the police that Rowland had grabbed her arm and nothing more, and would not press charges. The police determined that what happened between the two individuals was less than an assault. They conducted a low-key investigation rather than launching a man-hunt for her alleged assailant.

Regardless of whether or not assault had occurred, Rowland had reason to be fearful, as African American men accused of raping white women were often prime targets for lynch mobs. Realizing the gravity of the situation, Rowland fled to his mother's house in the Greenwood neighborhood.

== Tuesday, May 31 ==
=== Arrest of Rowland ===
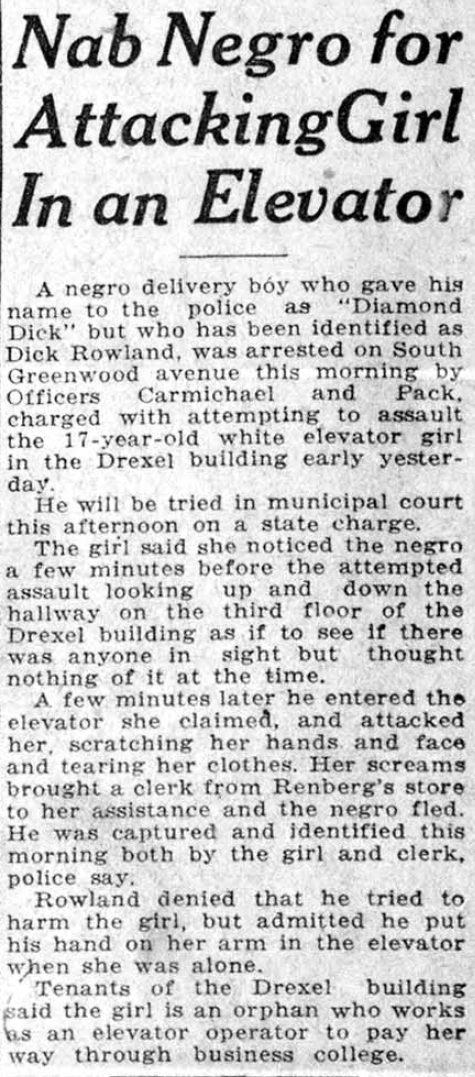
One of the news articles that contributed to tensions in Tulsa

On the morning after the incident, Henry Carmichael, a white detective, and Henry C. Pack, a black patrolman, located Rowland on Greenwood Avenue and detained him. Rowland was initially taken to the Tulsa city jail at the corner of First Street and Main Street. Late that day, Police Commissioner J. M. Adkison said he had received an anonymous telephone call threatening Rowland's life. He ordered Rowland transferred to the more secure jail on the top floor of the Tulsa County Courthouse.

Rowland was well known among attorneys and other legal professionals within the city, many of whom knew him through his work as a shoeshiner. Some witnesses later recounted hearing several attorneys defend Rowland in their conversations with one another. One of the men said, "Why, I know that boy, and have known him a good while. That's not in him."

=== Newspaper coverage ===
The Tulsa Tribune, owned, published, and edited by Richard Lloyd Jones, and one of two white-owned papers that were published in Tulsa, broke the story in that afternoon's edition with the headline: "Nab Negro for Attacking Girl In an Elevator", describing the alleged incident. According to some witnesses, the same edition of the Tribune included an editorial warning of a potential lynching of Rowland, titled "To Lynch Negro Tonight". The paper was known at the time to have a "sensationalist" style of news writing. Allegedly, all original copies of that issue of the paper have apparently been destroyed, and the relevant page is missing from the microfilm copy. The Tulsa Race Riot Commission in 1997 offered a reward for a copy of the editorial, which went unclaimed. A copy of the Tulsa Tribune of June 1, 1921, was found: on the front page was an article headlined "Nab Negro for attacking girl in an Elevator" [right]. The editorial page was also found: it did not have an article headlined "To Lynch A Negro Tonight". Other newspapers of the time like The Black Dispatch and the Tulsa World did not call attention to any such editorial after the event. So, the exact content of the column—and whether or not it existed at all—remains in dispute. However, Chief of Detectives James Patton attributed the cause of the riots entirely to the newspaper account and stated, "If the facts in the story as told the police had only been printed I do not think there would have been any riot whatsoever."

=== Stand-off at the courthouse ===
The afternoon edition of the Tribune hit the streets shortly after 3 p.m., and soon, news spread of a potential lynching. By 4 p.m., local authorities were on alert. White residents began congregating at and near the Tulsa County Courthouse. By sunset, around 7:30 p.m., the several hundred white residents assembled outside the courthouse appeared to have the makings of a lynch mob. Willard M. McCullough, the newly elected sheriff of Tulsa County, was determined to avoid events such as the 1920 lynching of white murder suspect Roy Belton in Tulsa, which had occurred during the term of his predecessor. The sheriff took steps to ensure Rowland's safety. McCullough organized his deputies into a defensive formation around Rowland, who was terrified. The Guthrie Daily Leader reported that Rowland had been taken to the county jail before crowds started to gather. The sheriff positioned six of his men, armed with rifles and shotguns, on the roof of the courthouse. He disabled the building's elevator and had his remaining men barricade themselves at the top of the stairs with orders to shoot any intruders in sight. The sheriff went outside and tried to talk the crowd into going home, but to no avail. According to an account by Scott Ellsworth, the sheriff was "hooted down". At about 8:20 p.m., three white men entered the courthouse, demanding that Rowland be turned over to them. Although vastly outnumbered by the growing crowd out on the street, Sheriff McCullough turned the men away.

A few blocks away on Greenwood Avenue, members of the black community gathered to discuss the situation at Gurley's Hotel. Given the recent lynching of Belton, a white man accused of murder, they believed that Rowland was greatly at risk. Many black residents were determined to prevent the crowd from lynching Rowland, but they were divided about tactics. Young World War I veterans prepared for a battle by collecting guns and ammunition. Older, more prosperous men feared a destructive confrontation that likely would cost them dearly. O. W. Gurley stated that he had tried to convince the men that there would be no lynching, but the crowd responded that Sheriff McCullough had personally told them their presence was required. At about 9:30 p.m., a group of approximately 50–60 black men, armed with rifles and shotguns, arrived at the jail to support the sheriff and his deputies in defending Rowland from the mob. Corroborated by ten witnesses, attorney James Luther submitted to the grand jury that they were following the orders of Sheriff McCullough, who publicly denied he gave any orders:

I saw a car full of negroes driving through the streets with guns; I saw Bill McCullough and told him those negroes would cause trouble; McCullough tried to talk to them, and they got out and stood in single file. W. G. Daggs was killed near Boulder and Sixth street. I was under the impression that a man with authority could have stopped and disarmed them. I saw Chief of Police on south side of courthouse on top step, talking; I did not see any officer except the Chief; I walked in the court house and met McCullough in about 15 feet of his door; I told him these negroes were going to make trouble, and he said he had told them to go home; he went out and told the Whites to go home, and one said: "they said you told them to come up here." McCullough said "I did not" and a negro said you did tell us to come.

=== Taking up arms ===
Having seen the armed black men, some of the more than 1,000 whites who had been at the courthouse went home for their own guns. Others headed for the National Guard armory at the corner of Sixth Street and Norfolk Avenue, where they planned to arm themselves. The armory contained a supply of small arms and ammunition. Major James Bell of the 180th Infantry Regiment learned of the mounting situation downtown and the possibility of a break-in, and he consequently took measures to prevent it. He called the commanders of the three National Guard units in Tulsa, who ordered all the Guard members to put on their uniforms and report quickly to the armory. When a group of whites arrived and began pulling at the grating over a window, Bell went outside to confront the crowd of 300 to 400 men. Bell told them that the Guard members inside were armed and prepared to shoot anyone who tried to enter. After this show of force, the crowd withdrew from the armory.

At the courthouse, the crowd had swollen to nearly 2,000, many of them now armed. Several local leaders, including Reverend Charles W. Kerr, pastor of the First Presbyterian Church, tried to dissuade mob action. Chief of Police John A. Gustafson later claimed that he tried to talk the crowd into going home.

Anxiety on Greenwood Avenue was rising. Many black residents worried about the safety of Rowland. Small groups of armed black men ventured toward the courthouse in automobiles, partly for surveillance and to demonstrate they were prepared to take necessary action to protect Rowland. Many white men interpreted these actions as a "Negro uprising" and became concerned. Eyewitnesses reported gunshots, presumably fired into the air, increasing in frequency during the evening.

In Greenwood, rumors began to fly—in particular, a report that whites were storming the courthouse. Shortly after 10 p.m., a second, larger group of approximately 75 armed black men decided to go to the courthouse. They offered their support to the sheriff, who declined their help.

There are conflicting reports about the exact time and nature of the incident, or incidents, that immediately precipitated the massacre. According to the 2001 Commission, "As the black men were leaving, a white man attempted to disarm a tall, African American World War I veteran. A struggle ensued, and a shot rang out." Then, according to the sheriff, "all hell broke loose." At the end of the exchange of gunfire, 12 people were dead, 10 white and two black.

Another firsthand account originates from Eloise Taylor Butler—the daughter of the famed "Peg Leg" Taylor—who was nineteen years old and in Greenwood on that day. According to Eloise's great-granddaughter, who passed on the story that Eloise told her, while "the initial story was that it started at the Courthouse," in fact, "It escalated to the Courthouse. It started like down the street from the Courthouse." This key inciting incident reportedly occurred when a group of around six white men approached and beat down a lone black man. Black store owners reportedly then came out of nearby shops to help defend the black man, and "once they started defending him, they ended up having to shoot." The account further notes, "[The black store owners] fought back the best they could. But...[the white mob] started on that end of town, where the black people started fighting, [the white mob] set those initial shops on fire at the very beginning."

The 2001 Commission itself does note that "African American homes and businesses along Archer were the first targets" of the white mob's arson. These could possibly be the same shops "down the street from the Courthouse" where this inciting incident reportedly took place, and it establishes an immediate motive for those particular shops being targeted first. Of course, it may simply be the case that they were targeted first only out of convenience—Archer being the first street on Greenwood's side of the Frisco Tracks. Moreover, while the Taylor account seems adamant that this incident occurred before the initial gunfight at the Courthouse (and then "escalated to the Courthouse"), it's still possible that the incident Taylor witnessed was itself simply a product of the rolling gunfight that is known to have ensued across the streets of Tulsa following that first widely reported exchange of gunfire.

=== Outbursts of violence ===
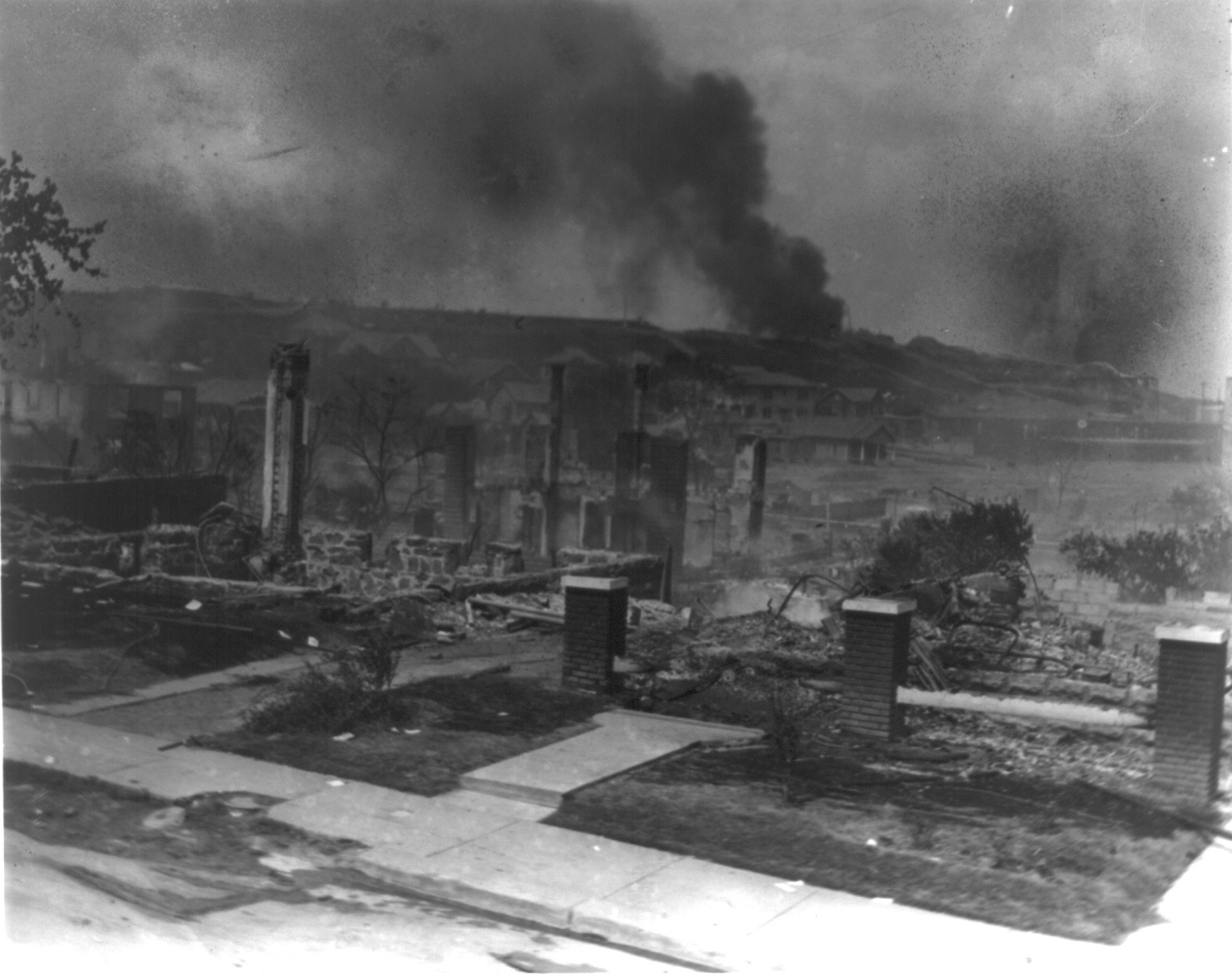
Smoldering ruins of African American homes following the massacre

The gunshots triggered an almost immediate response, with both sides firing on each other. The first "battle" was said to last a few seconds or so, but it took a toll, because ten whites and two black men lay dead or dying in the street. The black men who had offered to provide security retreated toward Greenwood. A rolling gunfight ensued. The armed white mob pursued the black contingent toward Greenwood, with many stopping to loot local stores for additional weapons and ammunition. Along the way, bystanders, many of whom were leaving a movie theater after a show, were caught off guard by the mobs and fled. Panic set in as the white mob began firing on any black people in the crowd. The white mob also shot and killed at least one white man in the confusion. According to the Oklahoma Historical Society, some in the mob were deputized by a police officer and instructed to "get a gun and get a nigger". So began a major attack on the African-American community.

At around 11 p.m., members of the National Guard unit began to assemble at the armory to organize a plan to subdue the rioters. Several groups were deployed downtown to set up guard at the courthouse, police station, and other public facilities. Members of the local chapter of the American Legion joined in on patrols of the streets. The forces appeared to have been deployed to protect the white districts adjacent to Greenwood. The National Guard rounded up numerous black people and took them to the Convention Hall on Brady Street for detention.

At around midnight, a small crowd of whites assembled outside the courthouse. Members of the crowd were heard yelling expletives and calling for Rowland to be lynched, but ultimately did not storm the courthouse.

== Wednesday, June 1 ==
Throughout the early morning hours, groups of armed white and black men squared off in gunfights. The fighting was concentrated along sections of the "Frisco" Railroad's tracks, a dividing line between the black and white commercial districts. A rumor circulated that more black people were coming by train from Muskogee to help with an invasion of Tulsa. At one point, passengers on an incoming train were forced to take cover on the floor of the train cars, as they had arrived amid crossfire, with the train taking hits on both sides. Small groups of whites made brief forays by car into Greenwood, indiscriminately firing into businesses and residences. They often received return fire. Meanwhile, white rioters threw lighted oil rags into several buildings along Archer Street, igniting them.

As unrest spread to other parts of the city, many middle-class white families who employed black people in their homes as live-in cooks and servants were accosted by white rioters. They demanded the families turn over their employees to be taken to detention centers around the city. Many white families complied, but those who refused were subjected to attacks and vandalism in turn.

=== Fires begin ===
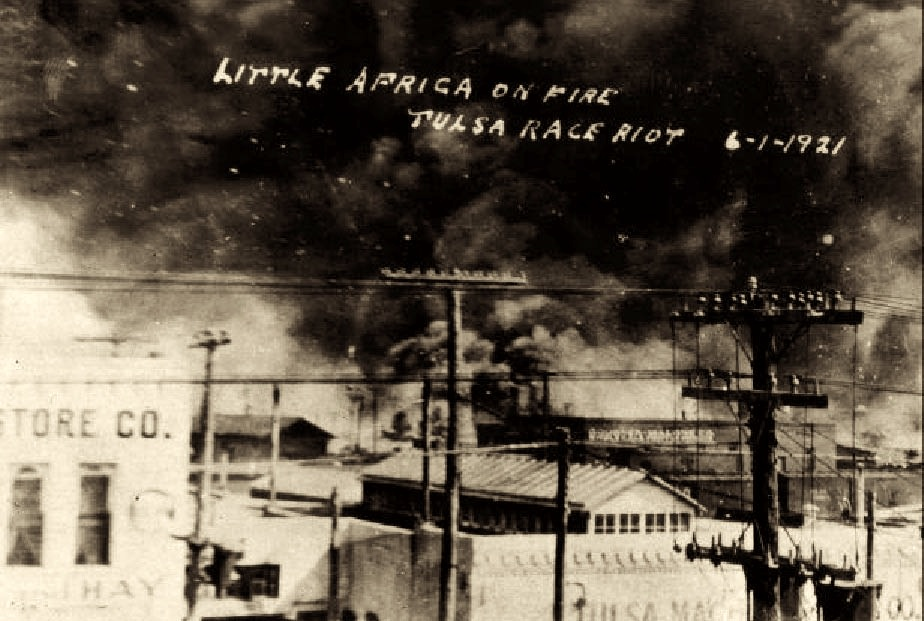
Photo postcard showing fires burning along Archer and Greenwood during the massacre

At around 1 a.m., the white mob began setting fires, mainly in businesses on commercial Archer Street at the southern edge of the Greenwood district. As news traveled among Greenwood residents in the early morning hours, many began to take up arms in defense of their neighborhood, while others began a mass exodus from the city. Throughout the night both sides continued fighting, sometimes only sporadically.

As crews from the Tulsa Fire Department arrived to put out fires, they were turned away at gunpoint. Scott Ellsworth makes the same claim, but his reference makes no mention of firefighters. Mary Jones Parrish, a survivor of the massacre, gave only praise for the National Guard. Another reference Elsworth gives to support the claim of holding firefighters at gunpoint is only a summary of events in which they suppressed the firing of guns by the rioters and disarmed them of their firearms. Yet another of his references states that they were fired upon by the white mob, "It would mean a fireman's life to turn a stream of water on one of those negro buildings. They shot at us all morning when we were trying to do something but none of my men was hit. There is not a chance in the world to get through that mob into the negro district." By 4 a.m., an estimated two dozen black-owned businesses had been set ablaze.

Tulsa co-founder and Ku Klux Klan member W. Tate Brady participated in the riot as a night watchman. This Land Press reported that previously, Brady led the Tulsa Outrage, the November 7, 1917, tarring and feathering of members of the Industrial Workers of the World—an incident understood to be economically and politically, rather than racially, motivated.

=== Daybreak ===
Upon sunrise, around 5 a.m., a train whistle sounded (Hirsch said it was a siren). Some rioters believed this sound to be a signal for the rioters to launch an all-out assault on Greenwood. A white man stepped out from behind the Frisco depot and was fatally shot by a sniper in Greenwood. Crowds of rioters poured from their shelter, on foot, and by car, into the streets of the neighborhood. Five white men in a car led the charge but were killed by a fusillade of gunfire before they had traveled one block.

Overwhelmed by the sheer number of attackers, black residents retreated north on Greenwood Avenue to the edge of town. Chaos ensued as terrified residents fled. The rioters shot indiscriminately and killed many along the way. Splitting into small groups, they began breaking into houses and buildings, looting. Several residents later testified the rioters broke into occupied homes and ordered the residents out to the street, where they could be driven or forced to walk to detention centers. A rumor spread among the rioters that the new Mount Zion Baptist Church was being used as a fortress and armory. Purportedly twenty caskets full of rifles had been delivered to the church, though no evidence was found.

=== Attack by air ===
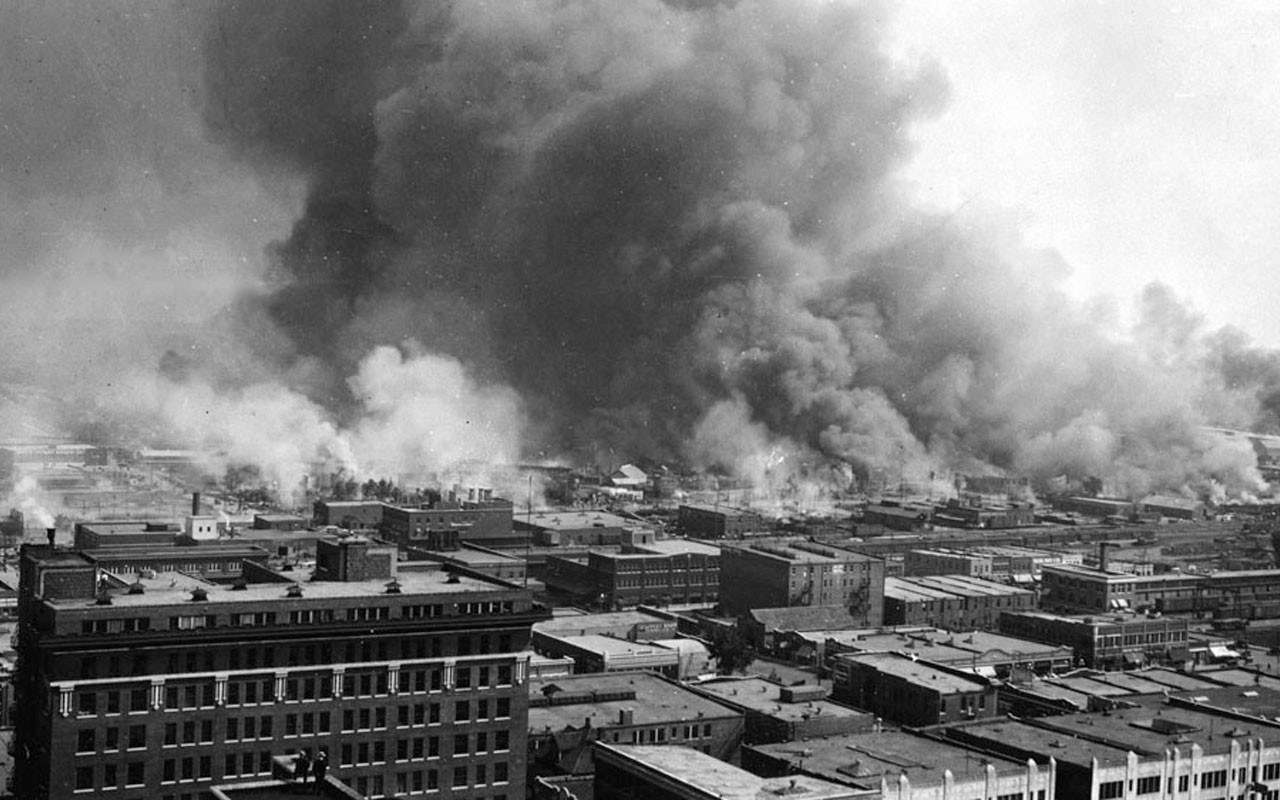
Flames across the Greenwood section of Tulsa

Numerous eyewitnesses described airplanes carrying white assailants, who fired rifles and dropped firebombs on buildings, homes, and fleeing families. The privately owned aircraft had been dispatched from the nearby Curtiss-Southwest Field outside Tulsa. Law enforcement officials later said that the planes were to provide reconnaissance and protect against a "Negro uprising". Law enforcement personnel were thought to be aboard at least some flights. Eyewitness accounts, such as testimony from the survivors during Commission hearings and a manuscript by eyewitness and attorney Buck Colbert Franklin, discovered in 2015, said that on the morning of June 1, at least "a dozen or more" planes circled the neighborhood and dropped "burning turpentine balls" on an office building, a hotel, a filling (gas) station, and multiple other buildings. Men also fired rifles at black residents, gunning them down in the street.

Richard S. Warner concluded in his submission to The Oklahoma Commission that contrary to later reports by claimed eyewitnesses of seeing explosions, there was no reliable evidence to support such attacks. Warner noted that while a number of newspapers targeted at black readers heavily reported the use of nitroglycerin, turpentine, and rifles from the planes, many cited anonymous sources or second-hand accounts. Beryl Ford, one of the pre-eminent historians of the disaster, concluded from his large collection of photographs that there was no evidence of any building damaged by explosions. Danney Goble commended Warner on his efforts and supported his conclusions. State representative Don Ross (born in Tulsa in 1941), however, dissented from the evidence presented in the report concluding that bombs were in fact dropped from planes during the violence.

In 2015, a previously unknown written eyewitness account of the events of May 31, 1921, was discovered and subsequently obtained by the Smithsonian National Museum of African American History and Culture. The 10-page typewritten letter was authored by Buck Colbert Franklin, noted Oklahoma attorney and father of John Hope Franklin.

Notable quotes include:

Lurid flames roared and belched and licked their forked tongues into the air. Smoke ascended the sky in thick, black volumes and amid it all, the planes—now a dozen or more in number—still hummed and darted here and there with the agility of natural birds of the air.

Planes circling in midair: They grew in number and hummed, darted, and dipped low. I could hear something like hail falling upon the top of my office building. Down East Archer, I saw the old Mid-Way hotel on fire, burning from its top, and then another and another and another building began to burn from their tops.

The sidewalks were literally covered with burning turpentine balls. I knew all too well where they came from, and I knew all too well why every burning building first caught fire from the top.

I paused and waited for an opportune time to escape. 'Where oh where is our splendid fire department with its half dozen stations?' I asked myself, 'Is the city in conspiracy with the mob?'

Franklin reports seeing multiple machine guns firing at night and hearing "thousands and thousands of guns" being fired simultaneously from all directions. He states that he was arrested by "a thousand boys, it seemed,... firing their guns every step they took." An account of Franklin's experiences during this event appears in his autobiography, My Life and an Era.

=== Arrival of National Guard troops ===
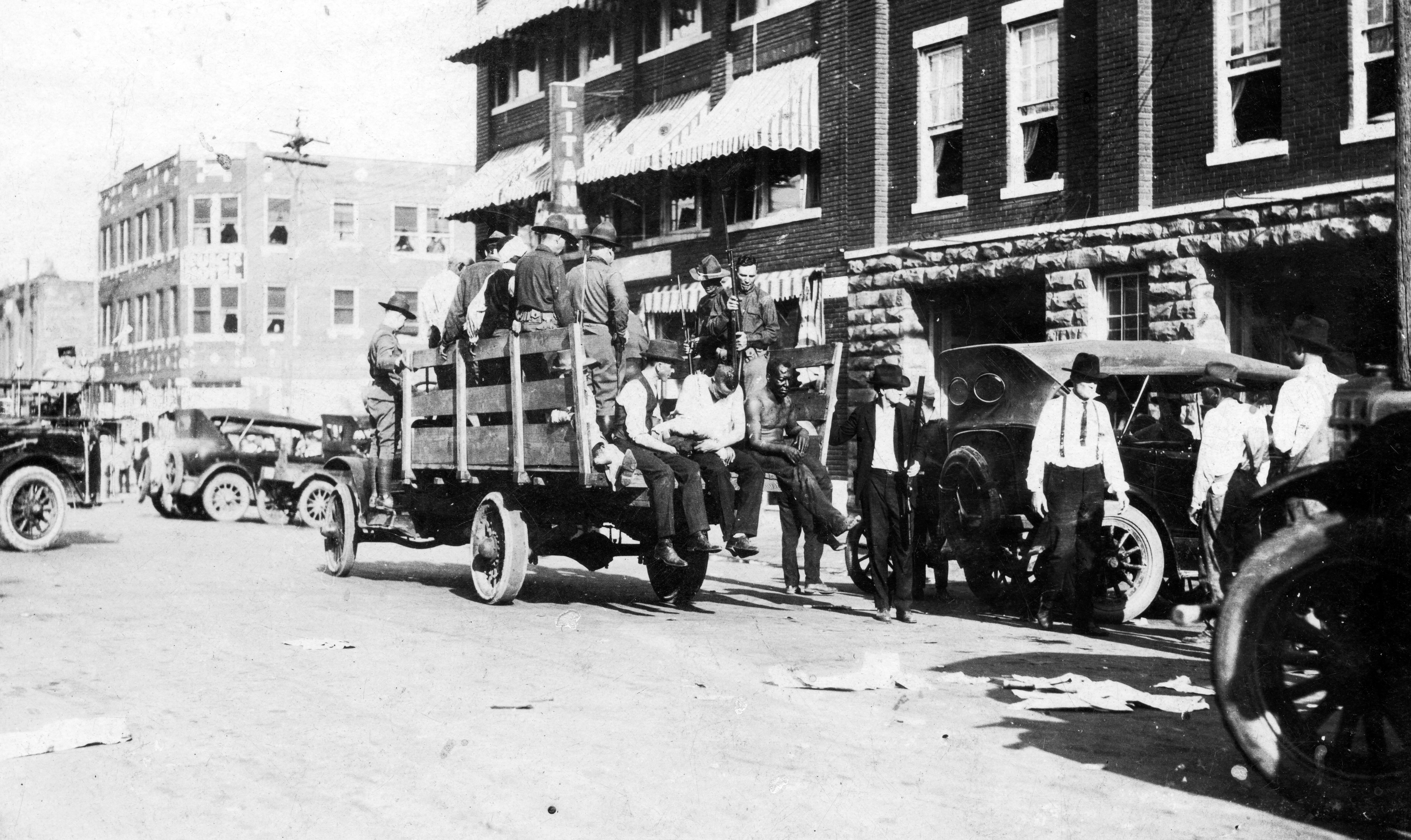
National Guard with the wounded

Adjutant General Charles F. Barrett of the Oklahoma National Guard arrived by special train at about 9:15 a.m., with 109 troops from Oklahoma City. Ordered in by the governor, he could not legally act until he had contacted all the appropriate local authorities, including Mayor T. D. Evans, the sheriff, and the police chief. Meanwhile, his troops paused to eat breakfast. Barrett summoned reinforcements from several other Oklahoma cities. Barrett declared martial law at 11:49 a.m., and by noon the troops had managed to suppress most of the remaining violence.

Thousands of black residents had fled the city; another 4,000 people had been rounded up and detained at various centers. Under martial law, the detainees were required to carry identification cards. As many as 6,000 Greenwood residents were interned at three local facilities: Convention Hall (now known as the Tulsa Theater), the Tulsa County Fairgrounds (then located about a mile northeast of Greenwood) and McNulty Park (a baseball stadium at Tenth Street and Elgin Avenue).

A 1921 letter from an officer of the Service Company, Third Infantry, Oklahoma National Guard, who arrived on May 31, 1921, reported numerous events related to the suppression of the riot:

- taking about 30–40 black residents into custody;
- putting a machine gun on a truck and taking it on patrol, although it was not functioning and much less useful than "an ordinary rifle";
- being fired on by black snipers from the "church" and returning fire;
- being fired on by white men;
- turning the prisoners over to deputies to take them to police headquarters;
- being fired upon again by armed black residents and having two NCOs slightly wounded;
- searching for black snipers and firearms;
- detailing an NCO to take 170 black residents to the civil authorities; and
- delivering an additional 150 black residents to the Convention Hall.

Captain John W. McCune reported that stockpiled ammunition within the burning structures began to explode, which might have further contributed to casualties.

Under Field Order No. 7, martial law was withdrawn on June 4, despite an appeal by the local Chamber of Commerce to Adj. Gen. Barrett to maintain State troop levels for at least a week longer.

== Aftermath ==
=== Casualties ===
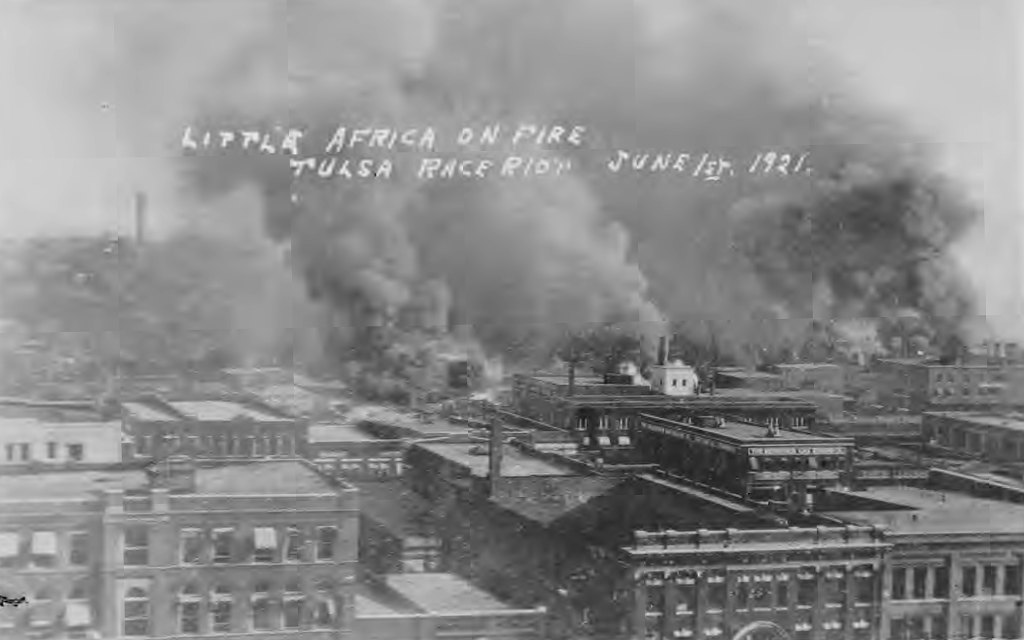
"Little Africa" taken from the roof of the Hotel Tulsa on 3rd St. between Boston Ave. and Cincinnati Ave. The first row of buildings is along 2nd St. The smoke cloud on the left (Cincinnati Ave. and the Frisco Tracks) is identified in the Tulsa Tribune version of this photo as being where the fire started.

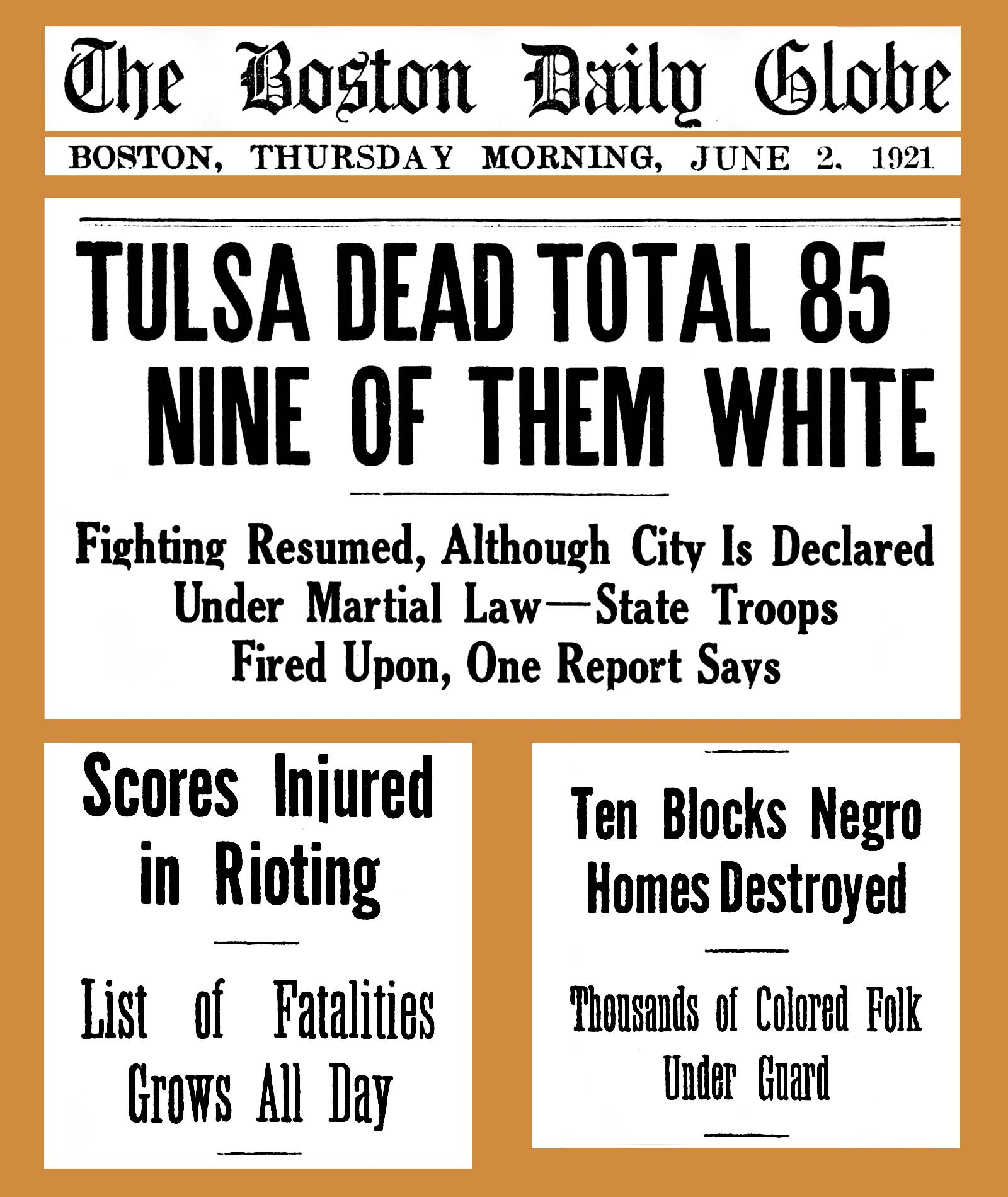
Newspapers nationwide reported the massacre, reporting the growing number of people killed

The massacre was covered by national newspapers, and the reported number of deaths varies widely. On June 1, 1921, the Tulsa Tribune reported that nine white people and 68 black people had died in the riot, but shortly afterwards it changed that number to a total of 176 dead. The next day, the same paper reported the count as nine white people and 21 black people. The Los Angeles Express headline said "175 Killed, Many Wounded". The New York Times said that 77 people had been killed, including 68 black people, but it later lowered the total to 33. The Richmond Times Dispatch of Virginia reported that 85 people (including 25 white people) were killed; it also reported that the police chief had reported to Governor Robertson that the total was 75; and that a police major put the figure at 175. The Oklahoma Department of Vital Statistics put the number of deaths at 36 (26 black and 10 white). Very few people, if any, died as a direct result of the fire. Official state records show five deaths by conflagration for the entire state in 1921.

Walter Francis White of the NAACP traveled to Tulsa from New York and reported that, although officials and undertakers said that the fatalities numbered 10 white and 21 black, he estimated the number of the dead to be 50 whites and between 150 and 200 blacks; he also reported that 10 white men were killed on Tuesday; six white men drove into the black section and never came out, and 13 whites were killed on Wednesday; he reported that Major O.T. Johnson of the Salvation Army in Tulsa, said that 37 blacks were employed as gravediggers to bury 120 blacks in individual graves without coffins on Friday and Saturday. The Oklahoma Commission described Johnson's statement being that his crew was over three dozen grave diggers who dug "about" 150 graves. Ground-penetrating radar was used to investigate the sites purported to contain these mass graves. Multiple eyewitness reports and "oral histories" suggested the graves could have been dug at three different cemeteries across the city. The sites were examined, and no evidence of ground disturbance indicative of mass graves was found. However, at one site, the ground disturbance was found in a five-meter square area, but cemetery records indicate that three graves had been dug and bodies buried within this envelope before the riot.

Oklahoma's 2001 Commission into the riot provides multiple contradicting estimates. Goble estimates 100–300 deaths, and Franklin and Ellsworth estimate 75–100 deaths and describe some of the higher estimates as dubious as the low estimates. C. Snow was able to confirm 39 casualties, all listed as male although four were unidentifiable; 26 were black and 13 were white. The 13 white fatalities were all taken to hospitals. Eleven of them had come from outside of Oklahoma, and possibly as many as half were petroleum industry workers. Only eight of the confirmed 26 black fatalities were brought to hospitals, and as hospitals were segregated, and with the black Frissell Memorial Hospital having burned down, the only place where the injured blacks were treated was at the basement of Morningside Hospital. Several hundred were injured.

The Red Cross, in their preliminary overview, mentioned wide-ranging external estimates of 55 to 300 dead; however, because of the hurried nature of undocumented burials, they declined to submit an official estimate, stating, "The number of dead is a matter of conjecture." The Red Cross registered 8,624 persons; 183 people were hospitalized, mostly for gunshot wounds or burns (they are differentiated in their records on the basis of triage category not the type of wound), while a further 531 required first aid or surgical treatment; eight miscarriages were attributed to be a result of the tragedy; 19 died in care between June 1 and December 30, 1921.

The nearly 10,000 people in Greenwood who were affected relied, in large part, on the relief efforts of the Red Cross. Important for the future survival of this district, they worked to create "a large-scale plan in order to provide security, food, shelter, job training and placement, health coverage, and legal support for all of them [the survivors]." The Red Cross was working in the aftermath of a tragedy, the victims of which "had all the characteristics of prisoners of war: homeless and helpless, abandoned by their home country, confined in specific areas, denied basic human rights, treated without respect and deprived of their possessions". In less than a year of being in Tulsa, the Red Cross had set up a hospital for black patients, which was the first in Oklahoma's history; performed mass vaccinations for illnesses that could have been easily spread in the camps where survivors found themselves, as well as built infrastructure to provide fresh water, adequate food, and sufficient housing for those who no longer had a place of residence.

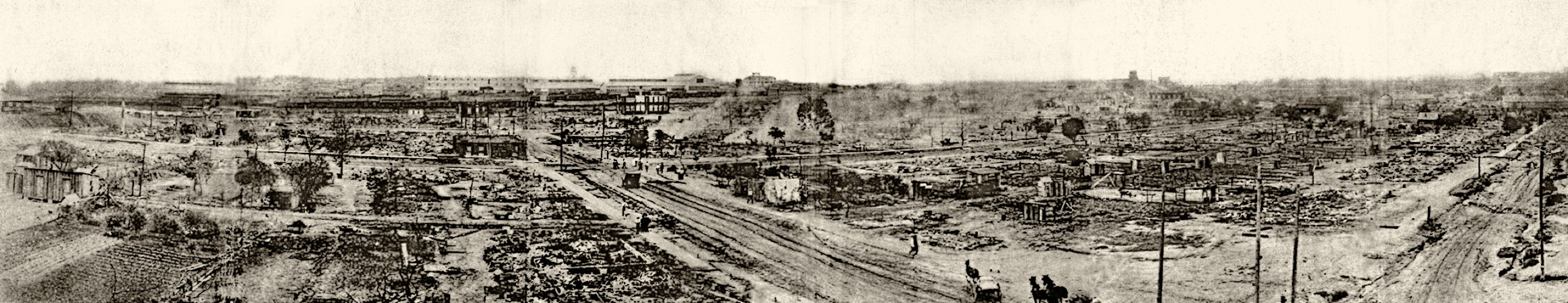
Taken from the southeast corner of the roof of Booker T. Washington High School, this panorama shows much of the damage within a day or so. The road running laterally through the center is Greenwood Avenue; the road slanting from the center to the left is Easton, and the road slanting off to the right is Frankfort.

=== Postcards ===
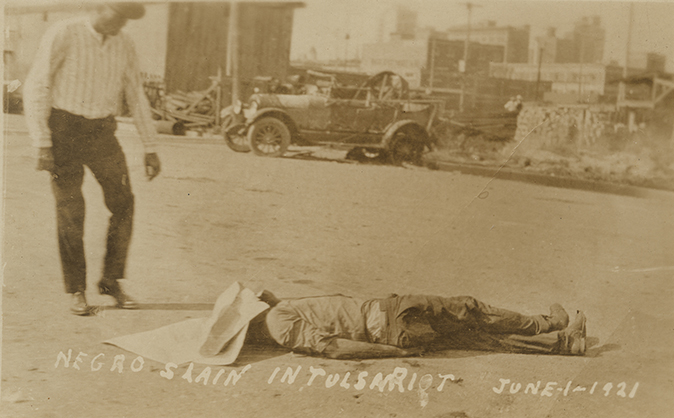
"Negro Slain in Tulsa Riot" "June-1-1921"

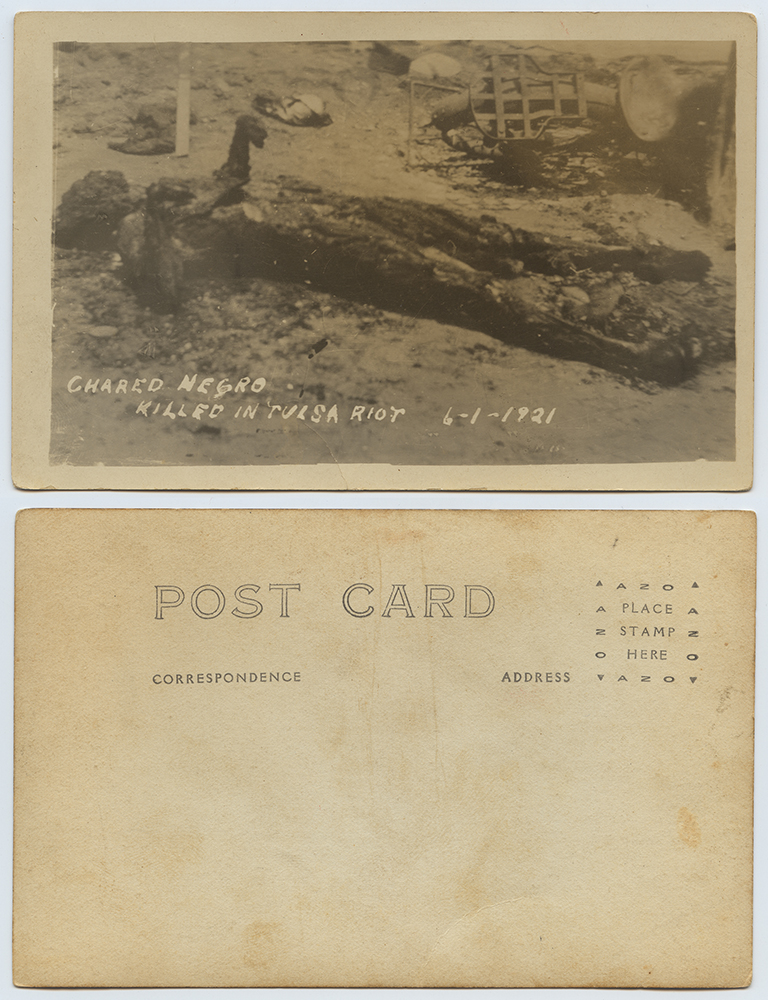
"Charred Negro" "Killed in Tulsa Riot" "6-1-1921"

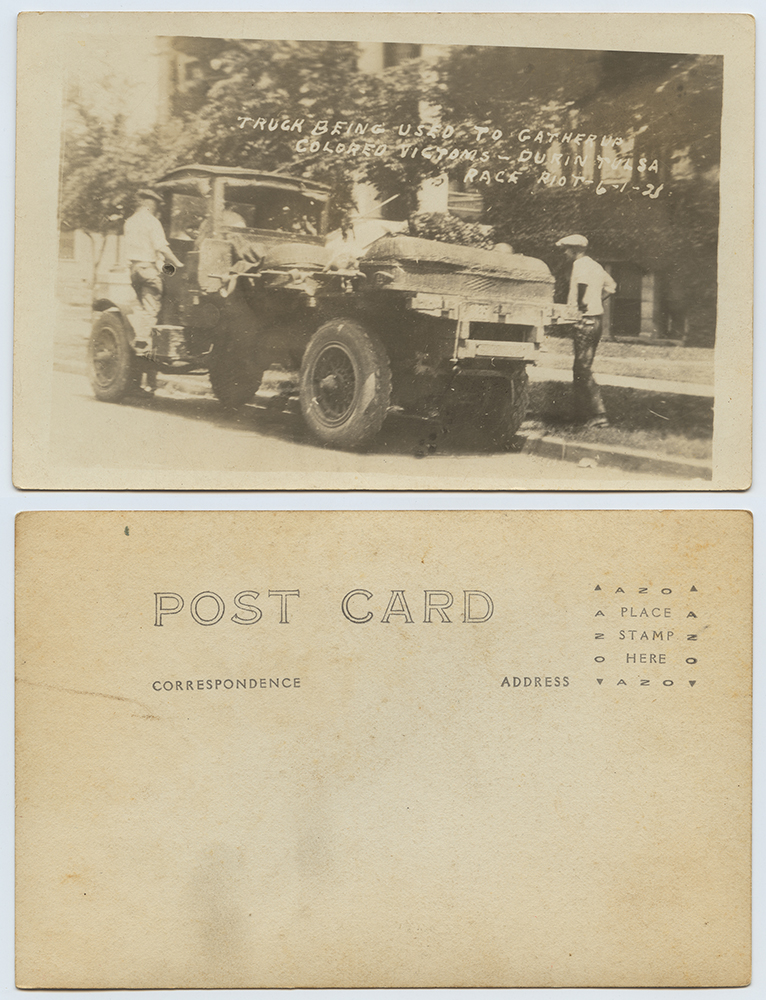
"Truck Being Used to Gather Up Colored Victims – During Tulsa Race Riot – 6-1-21"

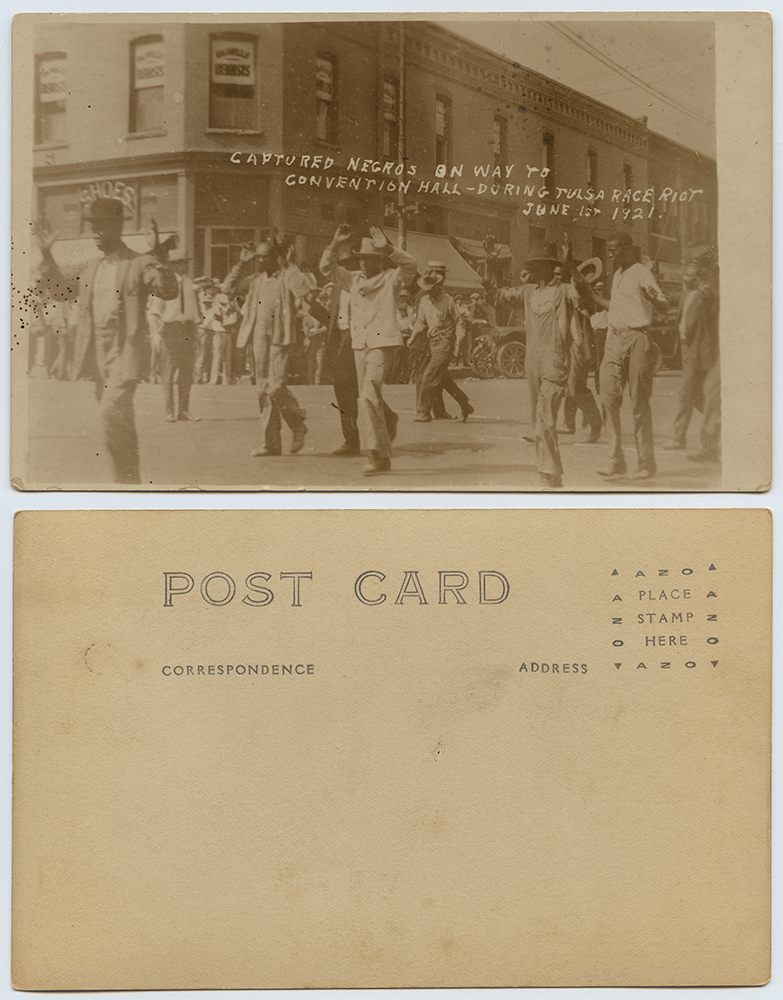
"Captured Negros on Way to Convention Hall – During Tulsa Race Riot June 1st, 1921"

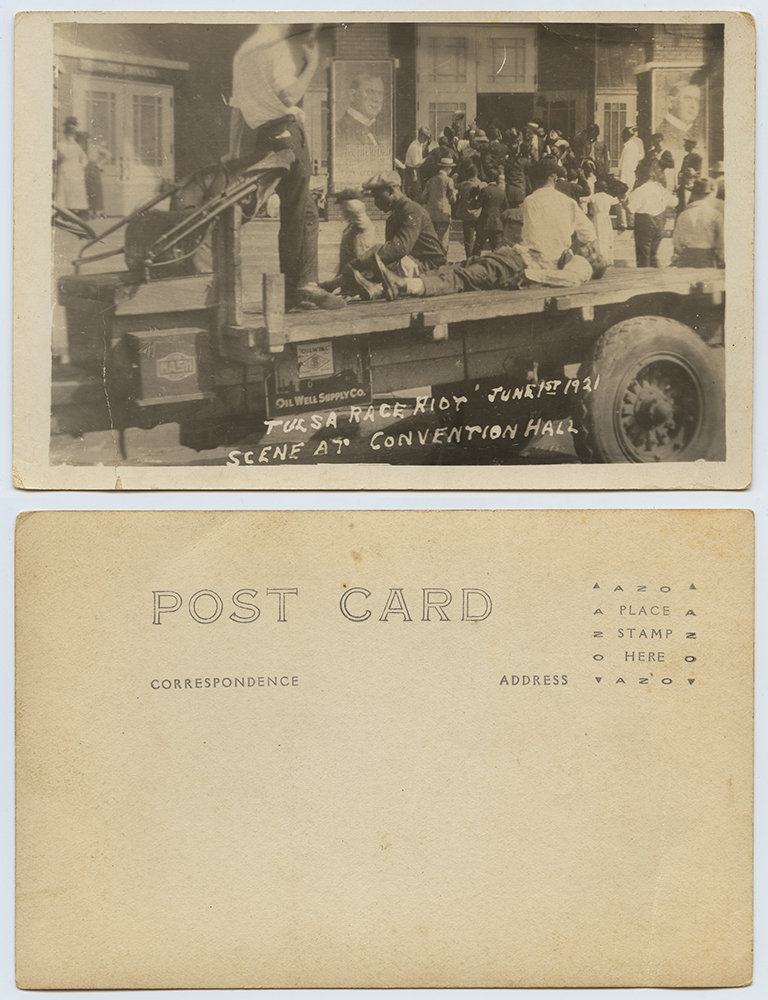
"Scene at Convention Hall – June 1st, 1921"

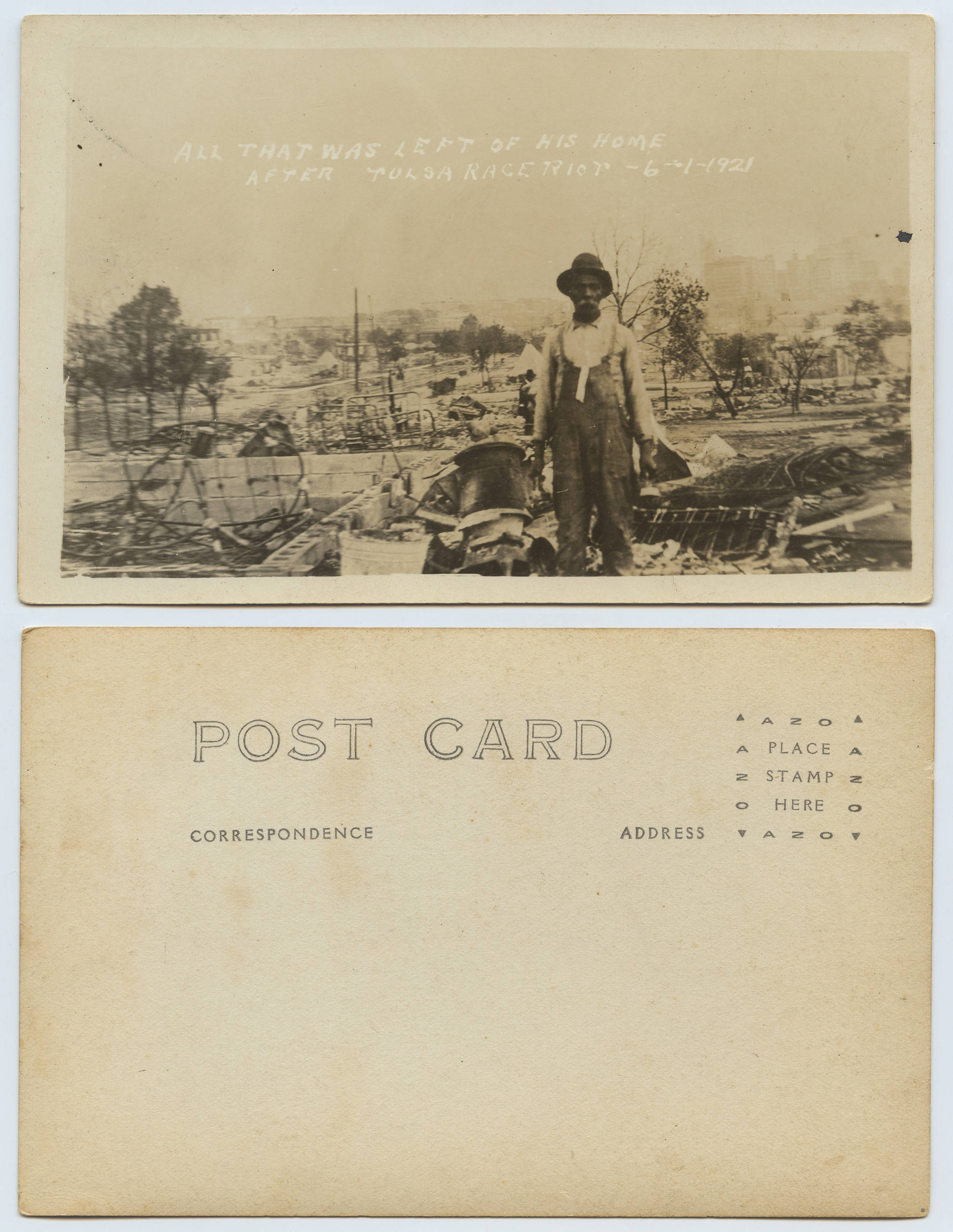
"All That Was Left of His Home after Tulsa Race Riot – 6-1-1921"

=== Property losses ===
The commercial section of Greenwood was destroyed. Losses included 191 businesses, a junior high school, several churches, and the only hospital in the district. The Red Cross reported that 1,256 houses were burned and another 215 were looted but not burned. The Tulsa Real Estate Exchange estimated property losses amounted to US$1.5 million in real estate and $750,000 in personal property (equivalent to a total of $41 million in 2025).

The Red Cross report in December 1921 estimated that 10,000 people were made homeless by the destruction. Over the next year, local citizens filed more than US$1.8 million (equivalent to $32 million in 2025) in riot-related claims against the city.

=== Identities of the African American victims ===
On June 3, the Morning Tulsa Daily World reported major points of their interview with Deputy Sheriff Barney Cleaver concerning the events leading up to the Tulsa riot. Cleaver was a deputy sheriff for Okmulgee County and not under the supervision of the city police department; his duties mainly involved enforcing the law among the "colored people" of Greenwood, but he also operated a business as a private investigator. He had previously been dismissed as a city police investigator for assisting county officers with a drug raid at Gurley's Hotel but not reporting his involvement to his superiors. He had considerable land holdings and suffered tremendous financial damages as a result of the riot. Among his holdings were several residential properties and Cleaver Hall, a large community gathering place and function hall. He reported personally evicting a number of armed criminals who had taken to barricading themselves within properties he owned. Upon eviction, they merely moved to Cleaver Hall. Cleaver reported that the majority of violence started at Cleaver Hall along with the rioters barricaded inside. Charles Page offered to build him a new home.

The Morning Tulsa Daily World stated, "Cleaver named Will Robinson, a dope peddler and all-around bad negro, as the leader of the armed blacks. He has also the names of three others who were in the armed gang at the courthouse. The rest of the negroes participating in the fight, he says, were former servicemen who had an exaggerated idea of their own importance... They did not belong here, had no regular employment, and were simply a floating element with seemingly no ambition in life but to foment trouble." O.W. Gurley, owner of Gurley's Hotel, identified the following men by name as arming themselves and gathering in his hotel: Will Robinson, Peg Leg Taylor, Bud Bassett, Henry Van Dyke, Chester Ross, Jake Mayes, O. B. Mann, John Suplesox, Fatty, Jack Scott, Lee Mable, John Bowman and W. S. Weaver.

=== Public Safety Committee ===
By June 6, the Associated Press reported that a citizens' Public Safety Committee had been established, made up of 250 white men who vowed to protect the city and put down any more disturbance. A white man, R.L. Osborne, was shot and killed that day after he failed to stop as ordered by a National Guardsman.

=== Rebuilding ===
Governor James B. A. Robertson had gone to Tulsa during the riot to ensure order was restored. Before returning to the capital, he ordered an inquiry into events, especially of the City and Sheriff's Office. He called for a Grand jury to be empaneled, and Judge W. Valjean Biddison said that its investigation would begin June 8. The jury was selected by June 9. Judge Biddison expected that the state attorney general would call numerous witnesses, both black and white, given the large scale of the riot.

State Attorney General Sargent Prentiss Freeling initiated the investigation, and witnesses were heard over 12 days. In the end, the all-white jury attributed the riot to the black mobs, while noting that law enforcement officials had failed in preventing the riot. A total of 27 cases were brought before the court, and the jury indicted more than 85 individuals. In the end, no one was convicted of charges for the deaths, injuries or property damage.

On June 3, a group of over 1,000 businessmen and civic leaders met, resolving to form a committee to raise funds and aid in rebuilding Greenwood. Judge Loyal J. Martin, a former mayor of Tulsa, was chosen as the chairman of the group. He said at the mass meeting:

Tulsa can only redeem herself from the country-wide shame and humiliation into which she is today plunged by complete restitution and rehabilitation of the destroyed black belt. The rest of the United States must know that the real citizenship of Tulsa weeps at this unspeakable crime and will make good the damage, so far as it can be done, to the last penny.

Many black families spent the winter of 1921–1922 in tents as they worked to rebuild. Charles Page was commended for his philanthropic efforts in the wake of the riot in the assistance of 'destitute blacks'.

A group of influential white developers persuaded the city to pass a fire ordinance that would have prohibited many black people from rebuilding in Greenwood. Their intention was to redevelop Greenwood for more business and industrial use and force black people further to the edge of the city for residences. The case was litigated and appealed to the Oklahoma Supreme Court by Buck Colbert Franklin, where the ordinance was ruled unconstitutional. Most of the promised funding was never raised for the black residents, and they struggled to rebuild after the violence. Willows, the regional director of the Red Cross, noted this in his report, explaining his slow initial progress to facilitate the rehabilitation of the refugees. The fire code was officially intended to prevent another tragedy by banning wooden frame construction houses in place of previously burnt homes. A concession was granted to allow temporary wooden frame dwellings while a new building, which would meet the more restrictive fire code, was being constructed. This was quickly halted as residents within two weeks had started to erect full-sized wooden frame dwellings in contravention of the agreement. It took a further two-month delay to secure the court decision to reinstate the previous fire code. Willows heavily criticized the Tulsa city officials for interfering with his efforts, for their role in the Public Welfare Committee, which first sought to rezone the "burned area" as industrial, and for constructing a union station in its place with no consideration for the refugees. Then he criticized them again for the dissolution of the Public Welfare Committee in favor of the formation of the Reconstruction Committee, which failed to formulate a single plan, leaving the displaced residents prohibited from beginning reconstruction efforts for several months.

=== Tulsa Union Depot ===
Despite the Red Cross's best efforts to assist with the reconstruction of Greenwood's residential area, the considerably altered present-day layout of the district and its surrounding neighborhoods, as well as the extensive redevelopment of Greenwood by people unaffiliated with the neighborhood prior to the riot, stand as proof that the Red Cross relief efforts had limited success.

Tulsa's main industries at the time of the riot were banking (BOK Financial Corporation), administrative (PennWell, Oklahoma Natural Gas Company), and petroleum engineering services (Skelly Oil), earning Tulsa the title of "Oil Capital of the World". Joshua Cosden is also regarded as a founder of the city, having constructed the tallest building in Tulsa, the Cosden Building. The construction of the Cosden Building and Union Depot was overseen by the Manhattan Construction Company, which was based in Tulsa. Francis Rooney is the great-grandson and beneficiary of the estate of Laurence H. Rooney, founder of the Manhattan Construction Company.

City planners immediately saw the fire that destroyed homes and businesses across Greenwood as a fortunate event for advancing their objectives, meanwhile showing a disregard for the welfare of affected residents. Plans were made to rezone 'The Burned Area' for industrial use. The Tulsa Daily World reported that the mayor and city commissioners expressed that, "a large industrial section will be found desirable in causing a wider separation between negroes and whites." The reconstruction committee organized a forum to discuss their proposal with community leaders and stakeholders. Naming, among others, O.W. Gurley, Rev. H.T.F. Johnson, and Barney Cleaver as participants in the forum, it was reported that all members were in agreement with the plan to redevelop the burned district as an industrial section and agreed that the proposed union station project was desirable. "... not a note of dissension was expressed." The article states that these community leaders would again meet at the First Baptist Church in the following days. The Black Dispatch describes the content of the following meeting at the First Baptist Church. The reconstruction committee had intended to have the black landholders sign over their property to a holding company managed by black representatives on behalf of the city. The properties were then to be turned over to a white appraisal committee, which would pay residents for the residentially zoned land at the lower industrial zoned value in advance of the rezoning. Professor J.W. Hughes addressed the white reconstruction committee members in opposition to their proposition, coining a slogan that would come to galvanize the community, "I'm going to hold what I have until I get What I've lost."

Construction of the Tulsa Union Depot, a large central rail hub connecting three major railroads, began in Greenwood less than two years after the riot. Prior to the riot, construction had already been underway for a smaller rail hub nearby. However, in the aftermath of the riot, land on which homes and businesses had been destroyed by the fires suddenly became available, allowing for a larger train depot near the heart of the city to be built in Greenwood instead.

=== 1921 grand jury investigation ===
==== Allegations of corruption ====
The Tulsa Police Department, in the words of Chief Chuck Jordan, "did not do their job then, y'know, they just didn't". Parrish, an African-American citizen of Tulsa, summarized the lawlessness in Oklahoma as a contributing factor in 1922 as, "if ... it were not for the profitable alliance of politics and vice or professional crime, the tiny spark which is the beginning of all these outrages would be promptly extinguished." Clark, a prominent Oklahoma historian and law professor, completed his doctoral dissertation in law on the subject of lawlessness in Oklahoma specifically on this period of time and how lawlessness had led to the rise of the second KKK, in order to illustrate the need for effective law enforcement and a functional judiciary.

==== John A. Gustafson ====
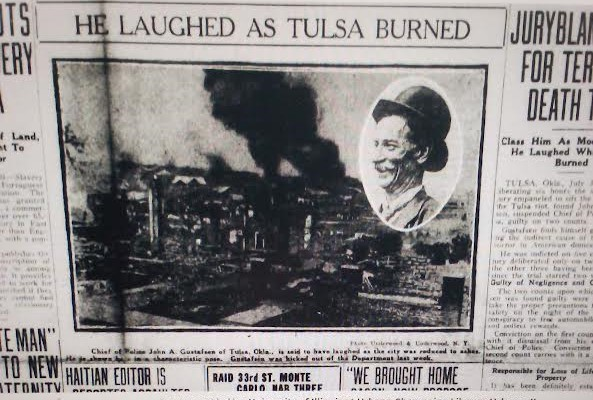
The Chicago Whip newspaper 30 July 1921 with a photo of Tulsa Police Chief John A. Gustafson

Chief of Police John A. Gustafson was the subject of an investigation. Official proceedings began on June 6, 1921. He was prosecuted on multiple counts: refusing to enforce prohibition, refusing to enforce anti-prostitution laws; operating a stolen automobile-laundering racket and allowing known automobile thieves to escape justice, for the purpose of extorting the citizens of Tulsa for rewards relating to their return; repurposing vehicles for his own use or sale; operating a fake detective agency for the purpose of billing the city of Tulsa for investigative duties he was already being paid for as chief of police; failing to enforce gun laws; and failure to take action during the riots.

The attorney general of Oklahoma received numerous letters alleging members of the police force had conspired with members of the justice system to threaten witnesses in corruption trials stemming from the Grand Jury investigations. In the letters, various members of the public requested the presence of the state attorney general at the trial. An assistant of the attorney general replied to one such letter by stating that their budget was too stretched to respond and recommending instead that the citizens of Tulsa simply vote for new officers.

Gustafson was found to have a long history of fraud pre-dating his membership in the Tulsa Police Department. His previous partner in his detective agency, Phil Kirk, had been convicted of blackmail. Gustafson's fake detective agency ran up high billings on the police account. Investigators noted that many blackmail letters had been sent to members of the community from the agency. One particularly disturbing case involved the frequent rape, by her father, of an 11-year-old girl who had since become pregnant. Instead of prosecuting, they sent a "Blackhand letter". On July 30, 1921, out of five counts of an indictment, Gustafson was found guilty of two counts: negligence for failing to stop the riot (which resulted in dismissal from police force), and conspiracy for freeing automobile thieves and collecting rewards (which resulted in a jail sentence).

=== Breaking the silence ===
Three days after the massacre, President Warren G. Harding spoke at the all-black Lincoln University in Pennsylvania. He declared, "Despite the demagogues, the idea of our oneness as Americans has risen superior to every appeal to mere class and group. And so, I wish it might be in this matter of our national problem of races." Speaking directly about the events in Tulsa, he said, "God grant that, in the soberness, the fairness, and the justice of this country, we never see another spectacle like it."

There were no convictions for any of the charges related to violence. There were decades of silence about the terror, violence, and losses of this event. The riot was largely omitted from local, state, and national histories: "The Tulsa race riot of 1921 was rarely mentioned in history books, classrooms, or even in private. Black and white people alike grew into middle age, unaware of what had taken place." It was not recognized in the Tulsa Tribune feature of "Fifteen Years Ago Today" or "Twenty-five Years Ago Today". A 2017 report detailing the history of the Tulsa Fire Department from 1897 until the date of publication makes no mention of the 1921 massacre.

Several people tried to document the events, gather photographs, and record the names of the dead and injured. Mary Elizabeth Jones Parrish, a young black teacher and journalist from Rochester, New York, was hired by the Inter-racial Commission to write an account of the riot. Parrish was a survivor, and she wrote about her experiences, collected other accounts, gathered photographs and compiled "a partial roster of property losses in the African American community". She published these in Events of the Tulsa Disaster, in 1922. It was the first book to be published about the riot. The first academic account was a master's thesis written in 1946 by Loren L. Gill, a veteran of World War II, but the thesis did not circulate beyond the University of Tulsa.

In 1971, a small group of survivors gathered for a memorial service at Mount Zion Baptist Church with black and white people in attendance. That same year, the Tulsa Chamber of Commerce decided to commemorate the riot, but when they read the accounts and saw photos gathered by Ed Wheeler, host of a radio history program, detailing the specifics of the riot, they refused to publish them. He then took his information to the two major newspapers in Tulsa, both of which also refused to run his story. His article, "Profile of a Race Riot" was published in Impact Magazine, a publication aimed at black audiences, but most of Tulsa's white residents never knew about it.

In the early 1970s, along with Henry C. Whitlow, Jr., a history teacher at Booker T. Washington High School, Mozella Franklin Jones helped to desegregate the Tulsa Historical Society by mounting the first major exhibition on the history of African Americans in Tulsa. Jones also created, at the Tulsa Historical Society, the first collection of massacre photographs available to the public. While researching and sharing the history of the riot, Jones collaborated with a white woman named Ruth Sigler Avery, who was also trying to publicize accounts of the riot. The two women, however, encountered pressure, particularly among whites, to keep silent.

== Survivors ==
The Tulsa massacre claimed an estimated 150–300 lives; over 800 people were seriously injured, and many more are estimated to have had their lives drastically changed forever. By April 2024, Viola Ford Fletcher and Lessie Benningfield Randle were the only two remaining survivors with memory of the Tulsa race massacre. Fletcher and Randle were still reported as the two last remaining survivors with memory of the event by November 2025 as well. Fletcher later died on November 24, 2025, thus making Randle now the last remaining Tulsa race massacre survivor with memory of the event.

=== Olivia Hooker ===
Olivia Hooker was born on February 12, 1915, in Muskogee, Oklahoma. Her family was one of the many families affected by the Tulsa Race Massacre of 1921 when she was only six years old. Her family's home in the Greenwood District of Tulsa, Oklahoma was broken into by a group of white men with torches and was torn apart. Many of her family's belongings were destroyed. One item that Hooker recalled was her sister's piano. She remembered hearing a group of white men whacking into the piano as she and her four other siblings hid under the dining room table, which their mother covered with a tablecloth. Her father owned a store in Tulsa, which she recalled was absolutely destroyed and only one safe was left standing. The only reason it was left standing was that it was too big and heavy to be destroyed or stolen. Hooker also remembered vividly her schoolhouse being destroyed and blown up with dynamite. After the massacre, Hooker and her family moved to Topeka, Kansas to rebuild their lives. Hooker recalled her mother telling her, "don't spend your time agonizing over the past." With a new fresh start in Topeka, Kansas, Hooker was the first African American woman to join the Coast Guard (in February 1945). After leaving the Coast Guard, Hooker went on to earn her master's degree in psychology from Teacher's College, Columbia University. She earned her doctorate in clinical psychology at the University of Rochester. Hooker went on to have multiple jobs with her degree in psychology, mostly basing her work on the Tulsa Race Massacre of 1921. Olivia Hooker retired from work at the age of 87. She died at the age of 103 on November 21, 2018, in her home in New York.

=== Eldoris McCondichie ===
Eldoris McCondichie was born on September 1, 1911, in Tyler, Texas. She was four years old when she and her family moved to Tulsa, Oklahoma in the Greenwood district. Her family was part of the working class. Her father had worked in a field and her mother did housework. On May 31, 1921, McCondichie was nine years old. She remembered being frantically awakened by her mother. She remembered her mother saying, "the white people are killing the colored people." McCondichie and her family evacuated their Tulsa home to find refuge up north from the massacre. McCondichie described how "airplanes were raining down bullets", and how no one had enough time to even put clothes on and evacuate their homes. She recalled seeing women walking on the railroad track with no shoes in their nightgowns. She remembered finding shelter in a chicken coop during the riots to protect herself from machine gun fire. After McCondichie and her family evacuated Tulsa, they found refuge in a farmer's home overnight. Her family traveled to Pawhuska, Oklahoma, where they stayed for about 2–3 days until they knew it was safe to return home. Upon returning to Tulsa, Eldoris described what was left of the Greenwood district as "war-torn". She recalled many businesses and homes were burnt to the ground. Her family slowly rebuilt their lives in Tulsa and never left, referring to it as their "forever home". Eldoris was married to Arthur McCodichie for 67 years and had four children; two sons and two daughters. She died on September 12, 2010, several days after celebrating her 99th birthday. Her final resting place is in the Crownhill Cemetery in Tulsa, Oklahoma.

=== George Monroe ===
George Monroe was five years old during the attack on the Greenwood district. He claimed some images could never leave his mind. He remembered seeing people getting shot and his own curtains being set on fire by a mob of white men. He also recalled hiding under a bed with his older sister, when a rioter stepped on his finger, causing his sister to throw her hand over his mouth to prevent the men from hearing his screams. George Monroe lived out the rest of his life in Tulsa, Oklahoma. He became a musician, owner of a Tulsa nightclub, and the first black man in Tulsa to sell Coca-Cola. George Monroe died in 2001.

=== Mary E. Jones Parrish ===
Mary Elizabeth Jones Parrish (1892–1972) was born in 1892 in Yazoo City, Mississippi. She moved to Tulsa around 1919 and worked teaching typing and shorthand at a branch of the YMCA. Parrish was reading in her home when the Tulsa race massacre began on the evening of May 31, 1921. Parrish's daughter, Florence Mary, called the young journalist and teacher to the window. "Mother," she said, "I see men with guns." The two eventually fled into the night under a hail of bullets. Mary Parrish wrote a first-person account and collected eye-witness statements from dozens of others and published them immediately following the tragedy under the title The Events of the Tulsa Disaster. Parrish documented the magnitude of the loss of human life and property at the hands of white vigilantes. Parrish hoped that her book would "open the eyes of the thinking people to the impending danger of letting such conditions exist and in the 'Land of the Free and the Home of the Brave.' A new edition was published in 2021 by Trinity University Press under the title, The Nation Must Awake: My Witness to the Tulsa Race Massacre of 1921. The new edition includes a new afterword by Anneliese M. Bruner, Parrish's great-granddaughter. The New York Times called Parrish's "a story of survival... remains relevant a century later" while The New Yorker called it "The first and most visceral long-form account of how Greenwood residents experienced the massacre."

=== Lessie Benningfield ("Mother Randle") ===
Lessie Benningfield, also known as Mother Randle, was born in Morris, Oklahoma on November 10, 1914. Her parents were farmers; she had three sisters and a brother. Benningfield does not recall much due to her young age during the massacre. She remembers a mob of white men barging into her home and then destroying her family's house. She has memories of feelings of intense fear while trying to evacuate her home and get somewhere safe with her family. She spent the rest of her childhood and young adulthood in Tulsa and graduated from Booker T. Washington High School. Benningfield is now a part of an active lawsuit with the Greenwood Advocates, which is a team of human and civil rights lawyers fighting for justice for victims and their families. Benningfield states she still has nightmares of seeing the piles of dead bodies she saw during the massacre. For her 106th birthday, which took place in 2020, the community raised thousands of dollars for her to remodel her home. Since then, she has been interviewed several times and remained in the public eye during the 2021 centennial anniversary of the massacre at the age of 107.

After the death of Viola Fletcher in November 2025, Lessie Benningfield became the last known living survivor of the Tulsa Race Massacre, and is now 112 years old.

=== Hal Singer ===
Hal Singer was born on October 8, 1919, in Tulsa, Oklahoma to two working-class parents. His mother worked in a wealthy white resident's home as a cook and his father worked producing oil rigging tools. Singer was 18 months old when the Tulsa Race Massacre of 1921 took place. A white woman, for whom his mother worked, put his family on a train to Kansas City during the massacre so the Singer family would have a safe place to wait it out. Up to the day of his passing, Singer recalled how forever grateful he was for the woman's kindness. When his family returned to their home, it was burnt to the ground. They had to rebuild their whole lives again from scratch. However, they stayed in Tulsa in the Greenwood district all through his childhood. As a young boy, Singer hung out by the rail tracks and invited jazz bands to come over and have some of his mother's cooking. This helped him in the long run as he became an iconic saxophonist of his generation. Singer went on to play with and for Duke Ellington, Ray Charles, and Billie Holiday. He was married for over 50 years to his wife Arlette Singer. On August 18, 2020, just months before his 101st birthday, he died in Chatou, a suburb of Paris, France.

=== Essie Lee Johnson Beck ===
Essie Johnson (1916–2006) was five years old when the Tulsa Race Massacre of 1921 took place. Her family evacuated their Tulsa home in the early hours of May 31. Beck remembers her parents making her and her siblings stay away from the windows because there were active shooters targeting the windows of homes. She describes the feelings of fright and confusion. Her family had to evacuate their home since almost all homes were being burnt to the ground in her neighborhood. Her mother took Beck and her four other siblings and started running to find shelter elsewhere. Beck recalls watching airplanes above her dropping bombs onto the roof of houses causing them to catch on fire. Her mother was trying to get her and her siblings to Golden Gate Park. Beck's father stayed behind to help as much as possible and to assist injured people. Beck recalls once they got to Golden Gate Park, they hid behind trees. Beck and her family soon after that found shelter in churches and school basements for the remaining days. Once they were cleared to go back, their home was burnt to the ground. Beck recalls having to live in a tent on the dirt waiting for their house to be rebuilt. She describes the whole experience to be awful.

=== Vernice Simms ===
Vernice Simms was seventeen years old when the Massacre took place. She lived in the Greenwood district with her family as she attended Booker T. Washington High School, where she was preparing for her prom. Simms remembers vividly being in her backyard when bullets started raining down and everyone was cautioned to get into the house as quickly as possible. As the riots and massacre progressed, Simms and her family found refuge at a white family's home, where they were safe from the massacre. When they returned to their Greenwood home, everything was burnt to the ground. Simms and her family had to live in a tent. She recalls Booker T. Washington High School being turned into a hospital for the wounded. Simms volunteered at the hospital where she fed and gave water to people who were injured during the massacre. While her house was being rebuilt by her father, she finished high school in Oklahoma City. Afterward, Simms studied at Langston University. After she graduated from university, she came home to see her house finally rebuilt. She recalls never getting any money from insurance or the government to help. Simms described the events as devastating and scary.

=== Lena Eloise Taylor Butler ===
Eloise Taylor was nineteen years old and she lived in Greenwood when the Massacre took place. She was the daughter of the famed Horace Greeley Beecher Taylor, better known as "Peg Leg" Taylor. According to Taylor's great-granddaughter, who has passed on Eloise's story, Eloise witnessed some of the first gunfighting of the Massacre. She recounts how Peg Leg Taylor "fought his way to" Eloise and helped her escape into the woods north of the city, where they then lay and hid while White rioters continued to hunt down and kill other survivors around them. "...they found some of the people that were out there in the woods laying on their stomach—Lord help these people!—and they just shot 'em. Right there on the ground where they lay. I'm talking about kids...women. They didn't care. Old people. People who had breastfed them. They didn't give a damn. They killed 'em right there on the ground..." Eloise was reportedly so terrified that when "...finally her daddy told her to 'get up...get up and c'mon,' she said [in order] for them to move, he had to hurt her. She said he had to hurt her to make her stand up." Eloise and her father then walked several miles to a nearby town, where they "got help, got warm, got clothes, got food, and moved on", and where they also "decided that they would never talk about it again". Eloise finally opened up to her great-granddaughters about her experience in 1997, only a few short years before she died in 2000 at the age of 98.

== Tulsa Race Massacre Commission ==
In 1996, as the riot's 75th anniversary neared, the state legislature authorized an Oklahoma Commission to investigate the Tulsa Race Riot, by appointing individuals to study and prepare a report detailing a historical account of the riot. Authorization of the study "enjoyed strong support from members of both political parties and all political persuasions". The commission had originally been called the "Tulsa Race Riot Commission", but in November 2018, the name was changed to "Tulsa Race Massacre Commission". The commission conducted interviews and heard testimony in order to thoroughly document the causes and damages.

The commission delivered its final report on February 21, 2001. The report recommended actions for substantial restitution to the black residents, listed below in order of priority:

1. Direct payment of reparations to survivors of the 1921 Tulsa race riot;
2. Direct payment of reparations to descendants of the survivors of the Tulsa race riot;
3. A scholarship fund available to students affected by the Tulsa race riot;
4. Establishment of an economic development enterprise zone in the historic area of the Greenwood district; and
5. A memorial for the reburial of the remains of the victims of the Tulsa race riot.

== Post-commission actions ==
=== Search for mass graves ===
The Tulsa Race Massacre Commission arranged for archaeological, non-invasive ground surveys of Newblock Park, Oaklawn Cemetery, and Booker T. Washington Cemetery, which were identified as possible locations for mass graves of black victims of the violence. Oral histories, other sources and timing suggested that whites would have buried blacks at the first two locations; black people were said to have buried black victims at the third location after the riot was over. The people who were buried at Washington Cemetery, which is reserved for black people, were probably thought to be those victims who had died of their wounds after the riot had ended, since it was the most distant suspected burial location from downtown.

Investigations of the three potential mass grave sites were performed in 1997 and 1998. Even though the total area of all three of these locations could not be surveyed, preliminary data suggested that they contained no mass graves. In 1999, an eyewitness who had seen whites burying black victims at Oaklawn Cemetery was found. A team investigated the potential area with more equipment. In the end, searches for mass graves were made with the aid of technology that included ground-penetrating radar, followed by core sampling. The experts' report, presented to the Commission in December 2000, could not substantiate claims of mass graves in Oaklawn Cemetery, Washington Cemetery, or Newblock Park. A promising spot in Washington Cemetery had turned out to be a layer of clay, and another promising spot in Newblock Park had turned out to be an old basement. The suggestion that the bodies had been burned in the city incinerator was also considered unfeasible and discounted, given the incinerator's capacity and logistical considerations.

In preparation for the 100th anniversary of the massacre, state archaeologists, using ground-penetrating radar, probed Oaklawn Cemetery for "long-rumored" mass graves. Mayor G. T. Bynum calls it "a murder investigation". After input from the public, officials from the Oklahoma Archeological Survey used three subsurface scanning techniques to survey Newblock Park, Oaklawn Cemetery, and an area known as The Canes along the Arkansas River. The Oklahoma Archeological Survey subsequently announced that they were discontinuing search efforts at Newblock Park after not finding any evidence of graves. On December 17, 2019, the team of forensic archaeologists announced that they had found anomalies consistent with that of human-dug pits beneath the ground at Oaklawn Cemetery and the ground where the Interstate 244 bridge crosses the Arkansas River. They announced that the anomalies are likely candidates for mass graves, but further radar surveys and physical excavations of the sites are needed. Researchers secured permission to perform "limited excavations" from the city and as a result, they will be able to determine what the contents of these sites are, beginning in April 2020, and while they do not expect to dig up any human remains, they asserted that if they find any human remains in the course of their excavations, they will treat them with the proper respect. An initial dig at a suspected area of the Oaklawn Cemetery in July 2020 found no human remains.

On October 21, 2020, a forensic team said that it had unearthed 11 coffins in Oaklawn Cemetery; records and research suggested that as many as 18 victims would be found. The forensic team will need to do more work in order to determine if the coffins contain the remains of massacre victims. As stated by Kary Stackelbeck, a state archaeologist, the remains will not be moved until they can be properly exhumed because their deterioration needs to be prevented. She also stated that the site where the remains were discovered "constitutes a mass grave.... We have a high degree of confidence that this is one of the locations we were looking for. But we have to remain cautious because we have not done anything to expose the human remains beyond those that have been encountered." The team planned to exhume the remains in June 2021. Forensic anthropologist Phoebe Stubblefield later planned to analyze the remains in order to determine if they are the remains of people who were killed in the 1921 massacre. In June 2021, after scientists resumed work at the site, 35 coffins were recovered from the mass grave. The remains of 19 people were taken to an on-site science lab. Officials stated that they have completed a preliminary analysis of nine of those human remains.

Stackelbeck announced in September 2023 a completed survey identified 59 gravesites, 57 of which were previously undiscovered. Seven sets of remains were recovered, each found in simple wooden boxes. C. L. Daniel was the first victim identified in July 2024 from the remains exhumed. He was a World War I veteran from Georgia who was a resident of Utah. By August 3, 2024, remains believed to be two additional victims of the riot were found. By August 16, 2024, the remains of eleven riot victims had been recovered from Oaklawn Cemetery.

=== Reconciliation ===
In March 2001, each of the 118 known survivors of the riot still alive at the time, the youngest of whom was 85, was given a gold-plated medal bearing the state seal, as had been approved by bi-partisan state leaders. The Tulsa Reparations Coalition, sponsored by the Center for Racial Justice, Inc., was formed on April 7, 2001, to obtain restitution for the damages suffered by Tulsa's black community, as recommended by the Oklahoma Commission.

On June 1, 2001, Governor Frank Keating signed the 1921 Tulsa Race Riot Reconciliation Act into law. The act acknowledged that the event occurred but failed to deliver any substantial reparations to the victims or their descendants. In spite of the commission's recommendation for reparations in their report on the riot, the Oklahoma state legislature did not agree that reparations were appropriate and thus did not include them in the reconciliation act. The act provided for the following:

- More than 300 college scholarships for descendants of Greenwood residents;
- Creation of a memorial to those who died in the riot. A park with statues was dedicated as John Hope Franklin Reconciliation Park on October 27, 2010, named in honor of the notable African-American historian from Tulsa; and
- Economic development in Greenwood.

=== Survivors' lawsuit ===
Five survivors, represented by a legal team that included Johnnie Cochran and Charles Ogletree, filed suit against the city of Tulsa and the state of Oklahoma (Alexander, et al. v. Oklahoma, et al.) in February 2003, based on the findings of the 2001 report. Ogletree said the state and city should compensate the victims and their families "to honor their admitted obligations as detailed in the commission's report". The federal district and appellate courts dismissed the suit on the grounds that a recommendation was not an "admitted obligation" and noting the statute of limitations had been exceeded on the 80-year-old case. The state requires that civil rights cases be filed within two years of the event. For that reason, the court did not rule on the issues. The Supreme Court of the United States declined to hear the appeal.

In April 2007, Ogletree appealed to the U.S. Congress to pass a bill extending the statute of limitations for the case, given the state and city's accountability for the destruction and the long suppression of material about it. The bill was introduced by John Conyers of Michigan and heard by the Judiciary Committee of the House but it did not pass, because of concerns about ex post facto legislation.

=== John Hope Franklin Reconciliation Park ===
A park was developed in 2010 in the Greenwood area as a memorial to victims of the riot. In October 2010, the park was named for noted historian John Hope Franklin, who was born and raised in Tulsa. He became known as a historian of the South. The park includes three statues of figures by sculptor Ed Dwight, representing Hostility, Humiliation and Hope.

=== Renewed calls for restitution ===
An extensive curriculum on the event was provided to Oklahoma school districts in 2020.

On May 29, 2020, the eve of the 99th anniversary of the event and the onset of the George Floyd protests, Human Rights Watch released a report titled "The Case for Reparations in Tulsa, Oklahoma: A Human Rights Argument", demanding reparations for survivors and descendants of the violence because the economic impact of the massacre is still visible as illustrated by the high poverty rates and lower life expectancies in north Tulsa. Several documentary projects were also announced at this time with plans to release them on the 100th anniversary of the event, including Black Wall Street by Dream Hampton, and another documentary by Salima Koroma.

In September 2020, a 105-year old survivor of the massacre, Viola Fletcher, filed a lawsuit with two other survivors against the city for reparations caused by damages to the city's black businesses.

In 2021, Oklahoma librarians persuaded the Library of Congress to change the official subject headings, which place limits on the terms that people are allowed to use whenever they conduct searches for some of the information, for the event from "riot" to "massacre".

On May 19, 2021, survivors Fletcher, then 107; her 100-year-old brother, Hughes Van Ellis; and 106-year old Lessie Benningfield Randle testified about their experiences during the massacre and their reparations lawsuit before a House Judiciary subcommittee. The lawsuit was dismissed with prejudice in July 2023, but in November 2023, their lawyers appealed that decision to the Oklahoma Supreme Court.

On June 12, 2024, the Oklahoma Supreme Court affirmed the dismissal of the lawsuit, effectively concluding the suit. The Court dismissed the lawsuit stating that although the grievances submitted by the plaintiffs were legitimate, they concluded that Oklahoma's public nuisance statute did not apply to them. Their testimony of the three survivors coincided with pending resolutions before the U.S. House and Senate Judiciary Committees that propose federal recognition of the centennial of the massacre on May 31 and June 1.

In September 2024, the Department of Justice opened a federal review of the massacre under the Emmett Till Unsolved Civil Rights Crime Act. The report was released on January 10, 2025, which found that "the massacre was the result not of uncontrolled mob violence, but of a coordinated, military-style attack on Greenwood".

Tulsa's ongoing Beyond Apology Commission is tasked with improving economic mobility and the building of inter-generational wealth for survivors of the massacre and was reported by The New York Times to be planning new housing benefits in January 2025.

On June 2, 2025, Tulsa mayor Monroe Nichols announced a $105 million private trust to benefit descendants of the massacre's victims.

=== House Bill 1775 ===
In 2021, Oklahoma governor Kevin Stitt signed Oklahoma House Bill 1775 into law. The bill is typically referred to as a ban on critical race theory. The bill has created confusion for educators regarding classroom content about the Tulsa race massacre. When asked about the impact of the bill on instruction around the massacre, State School Superintendent Ryan Walters said, "I'd say you'd be judgmental of the issue of the action, of the content of the character of the individual, but let's not tie it to the skin color and say that the skin color determined that." In response to criticism of his remarks, Walters said that he was "referring to individuals who carried out the crime … They had evil, racist intentions and murdered people … They didn't act that way because they were white, they acted that way because they were racist", and that students "should be able to learn that history". Walters' confusing responses illustrate the ambiguity of the bill's language resulting in concerns for educators as the stakes are high for violating the statute. The future of education on this topic remains unclear, as the bill is facing several legal challenges.

== President Biden's 2021 visit ==
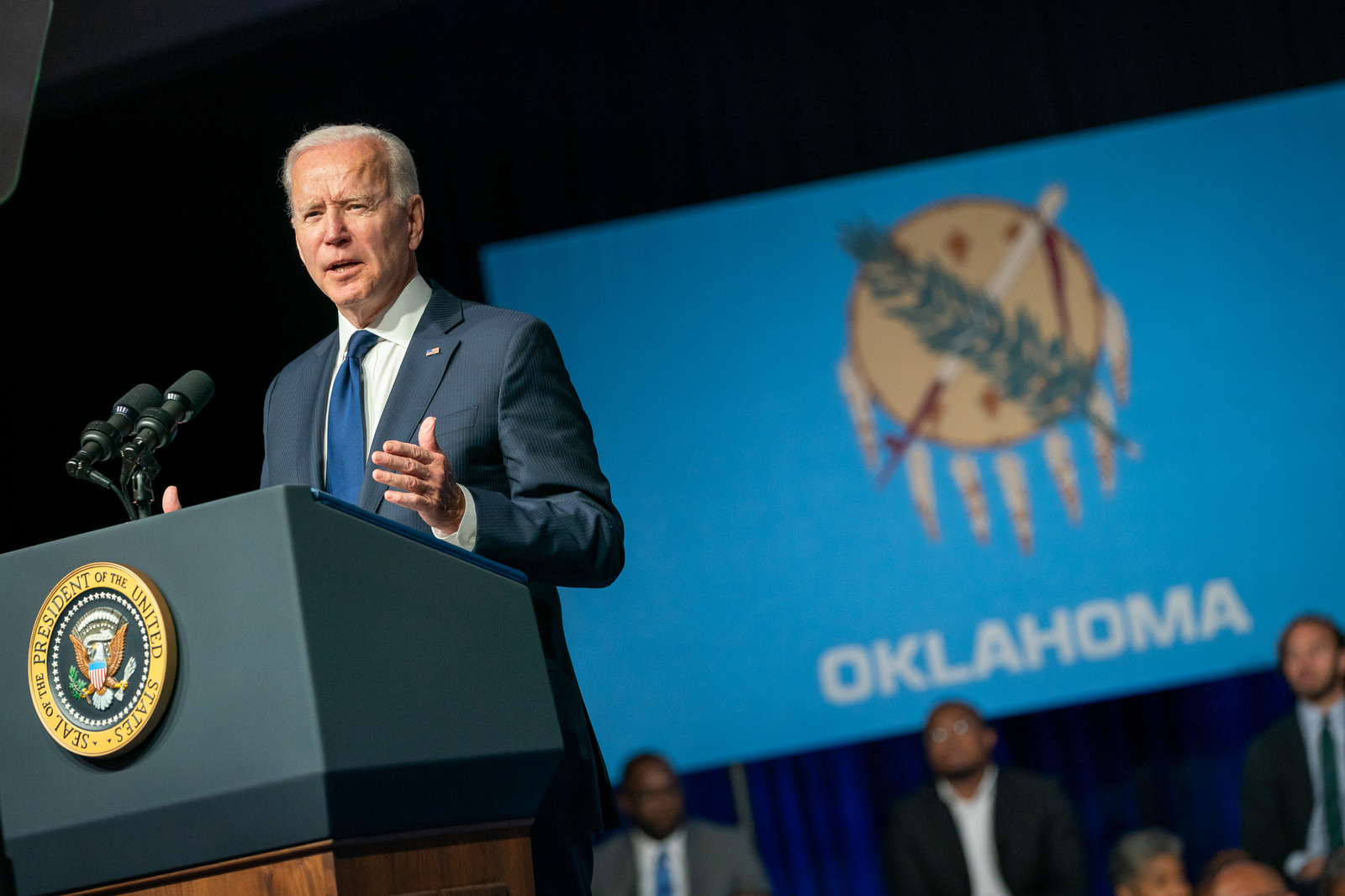
President Biden speaks at a ceremony marking the 100th anniversary of the Tulsa Massacre

On June 1, 2021, the 100th anniversary of the massacre, President Joe Biden visited the area, the first sitting president to do so, and during his visit, he made a speech in which he stated, "Some injustices are so heinous, so horrific, so grievous, they cannot be buried, no matter how hard people try." Biden toured the Greenwood Cultural Center and met with survivors Viola Fletcher, Hughes Van Ellis, and Lessie Benningfield Randle.

== Tulsa Historical Society and Museum ==
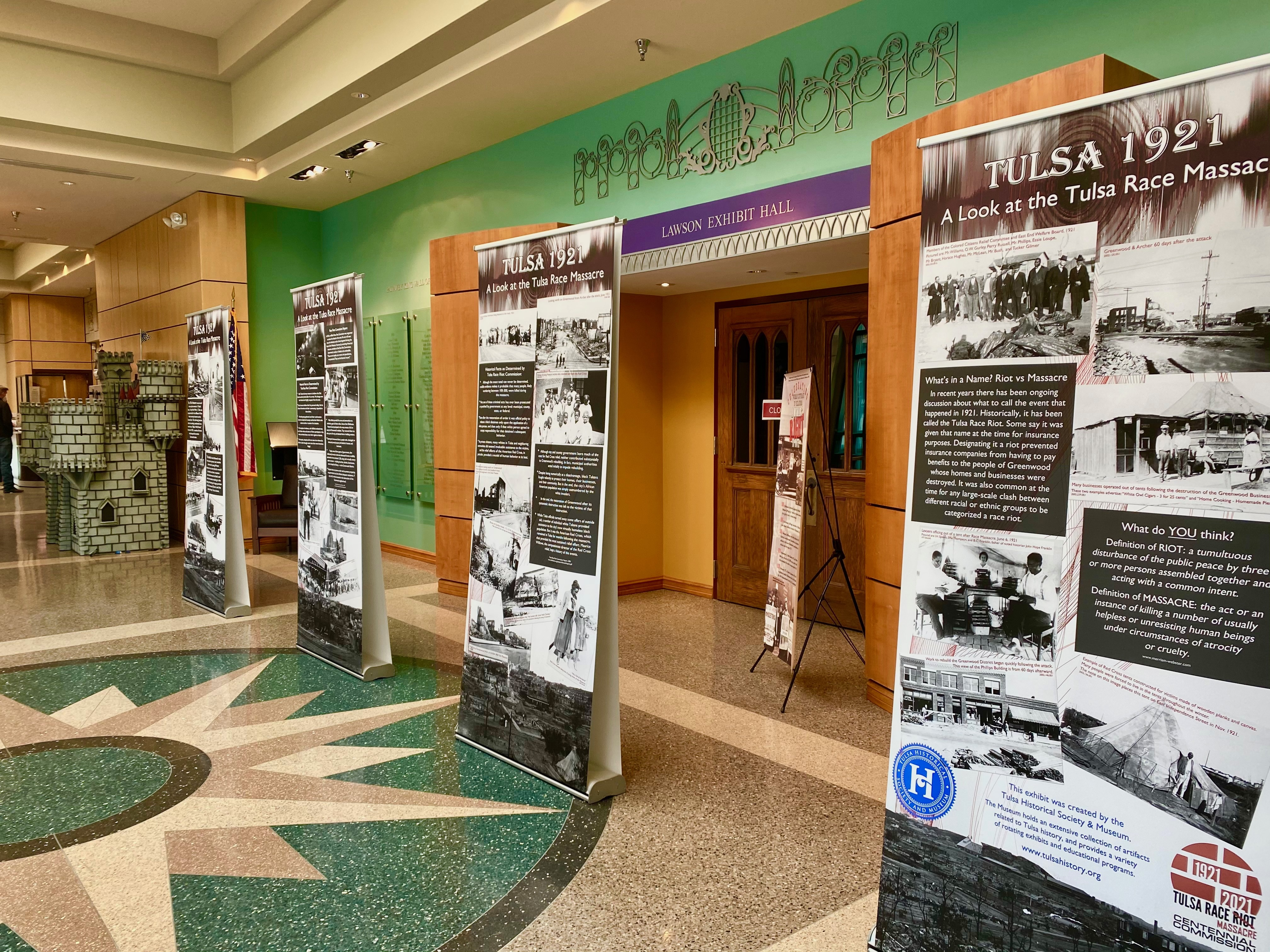
Tulsa Race Massacre: Traveling Panels

The Tulsa Historical Society and Museum offer a virtual exhibit of the Tulsa Race Massacre of 1921 that is open at all times during the day and is free of charge to the public. This online exhibit offers many photos, audio recordings, documents, and resources that cannot be found anywhere else. It also offers a traveling exhibit consisting of 4 panels regarding the Tulsa Race Massacre that are allowed to travel to locations within the Tulsa Metropolitan Area. The main goal of the panels is to educate the community.

== Present-day Black Wall Street ==
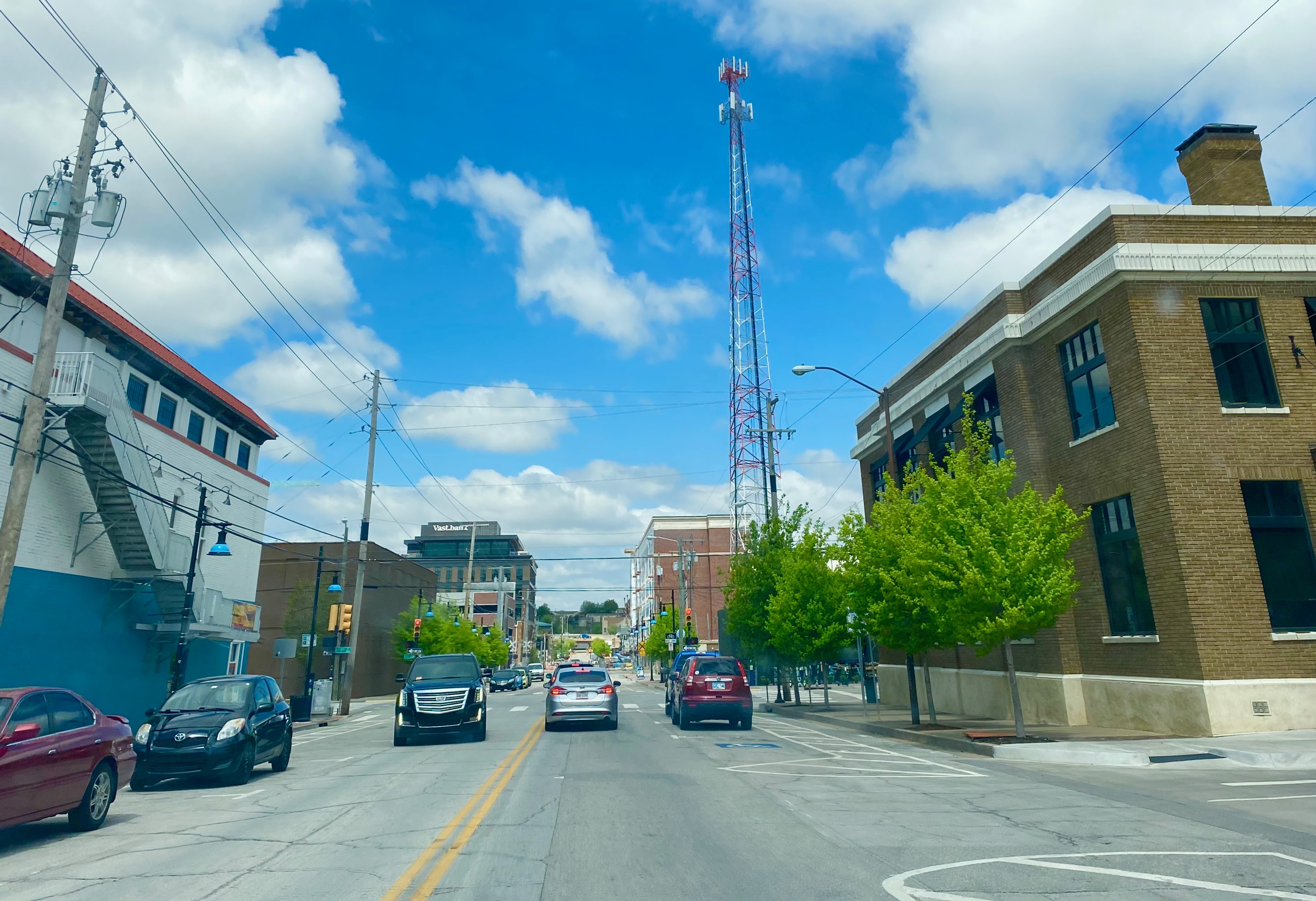
A drive through the present-day Greenwood District (March 2021)

Black Wall Street can still be found today under the Historical Greenwood District in Tulsa, Oklahoma. After the Tulsa Race Massacre of 1921, it took about 10 years to rebuild the district. The historical Vernon AME Church is the only building standing today that is a part of the last remaining structure of the 1921 massacre.

The residents of the Greenwood district try to keep the memory of the Tulsa Race Massacre prominent within the community. Today, many memorials stand out of respect for the memory of what was once Black Wall Street. Many investigations are still underway in the Greenwood District in the hope that more unmarked graves can be found and more victims of the Massacre can be identified.

== In popular culture ==
=== Literature ===
- The Nation Must Awake: My Witness to the Tulsa Race Massacre of 1921 (2021; Trinity University Press ISBN 978-1595349439) by Mary E. Jones Parrish, previously titled The Events of the Tulsa Disaster (1923, self-published), eyewitness accounts that were compiled by a woman who survived the massacre.
- Magic City (1998; HarperCollins: ISBN 978-0060929077), presents a fictionalized account of the massacre.
- Fire in Beulah (2001; Penguin Books: ISBN 978-0142000243), a novel by Rilla Askew, is set during the riot.
- The Burning: Massacre, Destruction, and the Tulsa Race Riot of 1921 (2001; Thomas Dunne Books: ISBN 978-0312272838), a nonfiction account of the massacre by Tim Madigan.
- If We Must Die (2002; TCU Press: ISBN 978-0875652627), a novel about Tulsa's 1921 Greenwood Riot by Pat Carr. A poem with the same name was published by Claude McKay in 1919 and it is about the Red Summer race riots.
- Tulsa Burning (2002), a book by Anna Myers, is a novel for middle-grade readers set during the riot.
- Riot and Remembrance: The Tulsa Race War and Its Legacy (2003;) Mariner Books. ISBN 0-618-10813-0, a nonfiction account of the massacre by James S. Hirsch
- Big Mama Speaks (2011), Hannibal B. Johnson's one-woman play featuring Vanessa Harris-Adams and remembrances and reminiscences of the Black Wall Street.
- "The Case for Reparations" (2014) in The Atlantic, an article by Ta-Nehisi Coates that brought more attention to the riots.
- Dreamland Burning (2017; Little, Brown and Company: ISBN 978-0316384902), a novel by Jennifer Latham that interweaves the events in Tulsa in 1921 with their modern consequences.
- The Tulsa massacre gives the backstory for Bitter Root, an Eisner Award winning comic series by David F. Walker, Chuck Brown, and Sanford Greene.
- Unspeakable: The Tulsa Race Massacre (2021; Carolrhoda Books ISBN 978-1541581203) with text by Carole Boston Weatherford and illustrations by Floyd Cooper was awarded the 2022 Caldecott Medal.

=== Film and television ===
- Going back to T-Town (1993), a documentary directed by Samuel D. Pollard and Joyce Vaughn, released as Episode 12, Season 5 of American Experience, a TV series on PBS
- The Tulsa Lynching of 1921: A Hidden Story (2000), a documentary directed by Michael Wilkerson, was first released on Cinemax in 2000.
- Before They Die (2008), a documentary by Reggie Turner, endorsed by the Tulsa Project, chronicling the lives of the last survivors of the Tulsa Race Riot and their quest for justice from both the city and the state.
- Hate Crimes in the Heartland (2014), a documentary by Rachel Lyon and Bavand Karim that provides an in-depth examination of the riot.
- Watchmen (2019), a TV series on HBO, based on the characters in the graphic novel with the same name. The producer of the series, Damon Lindelof, was inspired to open the pilot episode with depictions of the riots and base the series on racial tensions after he read Coates' article about them. Many aspects of the series' plot center on the legacy of the graphic novel and the massacre in an alternate timeline in the present day in Tulsa, where racial conflict remains high. Due to its popularity, Watchmen was considered the first exposé of the Tulsa race massacre via the entertainment industry because its history was not widely discussed and it had never been depicted in that way before.
- Lovecraft Country (2020), a TV series on HBO, based on the 2016 novel with the same title. In episode 9, titled "Rewind 1921", its main characters Atticus "Tic" Freeman, his father Montrose Freeman, and Letitia "Leti" Lewis travel back in time to the night of the massacre in order to retrieve a spell book (which was burned in the fictional reality on that night) and use it to save the life of a family member.
- In the television 2021 version of The Equalizer, Season 2 episode 10, titled "Legacy", tells a fictionalized story of a family whose home was destroyed during the Tulsa race massacre and who had a painting of a member stolen by a white family that would later become tycoons in the shipping industry. The main character, Robyn McCall, is asked to retrieve the painting for an elderly survivor of the events.
- In Who We Are: A Chronicle of Racism in America (2021), civil rights lawyer Jeffery Robinson visits the Greenwood District of Tulsa and speaks with residents about the massacre. In a conversation at Oaklawn Cemetery with Rev. Dr. Robert Turner and Chief Egunwale F. Amusan (who serves as the President of the African Ancestral Society), Robinson asks, "What is the most reasonable estimate of how many people died?" Amusan replies, "You're looking at 4,000 people that you cannot account for."
- Killers of the Flower Moon (2023), a film directed by Martin Scorsese and based on the 2017 book of the same name by David Grann, features footage of the massacre.

=== Music and art ===
- Graham Nash's song, "Dirty Little Secret" from his 2002 album Songs for Survivors is about the Tulsa race massacre.
- Scorched Earth (2006), a work of art on canvas by Mark Bradford, on display at The Broad museum
- Race Riot Suite (2011), a jazz suite by Jacob Fred Jazz Odyssey, released by Kinnara Records, was recorded at Tulsa's Church Studio
- Bob Dylan's song "Murder Most Foul" on his 2020 album Rough and Rowdy Ways has the line "Take me back to Tulsa to the scene of the crime"
- The Gap Band, which was formed in Tulsa, was named after Greenwood, Archer, and Pine streets in remembrance of the Tulsa race massacre. A long-standing rumor claimed that their 1982 song "You Dropped a Bomb on Me" was inspired by the aerial bombing during the massacre, but this was debunked by frontman and songwriter Charlie Wilson.
- Steph Simon, an African American rapper from Tulsa, uses the history of the 1921 Tulsa Race Massacre as a regular motif across his discography.

== See also ==
- List of incidents of civil unrest in the United States
- List of massacres in the United States
- List of expulsions of African Americans
- Mass racial violence in the United States
- Lynching in the United States
- False accusation of rape § Justification for lynchings
- Nadir of American race relations
- Racism against African Americans
- Racism in the United States

== Bibliography ==
- Alexander, Charles C (1965). The Ku Klux Klan in the Southwest. OCLC 637673750.
- Brophy, Alfred L. (2002). Reconstructing the Dreamland: The Tulsa Race Riot of 1921, Race Reparations, and Reconciliation. New York: Oxford University Press. ISBN 0-19-514685-9. "[T]the best account of the 1921 Tulsa riot, which drew wide acclaim from historians and others". – Rao, Gautham (September 2017). "University, Court, and Slave: Pro-Slavery Thought in Southern Colleges and Courts and the Coming of Civil War by Alfred L. Brophy (review)". Journal of the Civil War Era. 7 (3): 481–483. doi:10.1353/cwe.2017.0069. S2CID 148763755.
- Ellsworth, Scott (1992). Death in a Promised Land: The Tulsa Race Riot of 1921. Baton Rouge, LA: Louisiana State University Press. ISBN 978-0-8071-1767-5.
- Franklin, Buck Colbert (August 22, 1931). "The Tulsa Race Riot and Three of Its Victims". National Museum of African American History and Culture. Archived from the original on December 3, 2018. Full text.
- Greenwood, Ronni Michelle (June 2015). "Remembrance, Responsibility, and Reparations: The Use of Emotions in Talk about the 1921 Tulsa Race Riot". Journal of Social Issues. 71 (2): 338–355. doi:10.1111/josi.12114.
- Halliburton, Jr., R. (March 1, 1972). "The Tulsa Race War of 1921". Journal of Black Studies. 2 (3): 333–358. doi:10.1177/002193477200200305. JSTOR 2783722. S2CID 161789413.
- Halliburton, Jr., R. (1975). The Tulsa Race War of 1921. San Francisco: R and E Research Associates. ISBN 0-88-247333-6.
- Hirsch, James S. (2002). Riot and Remembrance: The Tulsa Race War and Its Legacy. Boston, MA: Houghton Mifflin. ISBN 0-618-10813-0.
- Hower, Rob (1993). 1921 Tulsa Race Riot: The American Red Cross – Angels of Mercy. Tulsa, OK: Homestead Press. ISBN 0-96-658230-6.
- Johnson, Hannibal B. (1998). Black Wall Street: From Riot to Renaissance in Tulsa's Historic Greenwood District. Austin, TX: Eakin Press. ISBN 1-57-168221-X.
- Krehbiel, Randy (2019). Tulsa, 1921: Reporting a Massacre. University of Oklahoma Press. ISBN 978-0-8061-6583-7.
- Luckerson, Victor (2023). Built from the Fire: The Epic Story of Tulsa's Greenwood District, America's Black Wall Street. Random House. ISBN 978-0593134375.
- Madigan, Tim. The Burning: Massacre, Destruction, and the Tulsa Race Riot of 1921. New York: Thomas Dunne Books, 2001. ISBN 0-31-227283-9
- Oklahoma Commission to Study the Tulsa Race Riot of 1921 (PDF) (Report). Tulsa, Oklahoma: Oklahoma Commission. February 28, 2001. Archived (PDF) from the original on June 2, 2018.
- Parrish, Mary E. Jones (1922). "Events of the Tulsa Disaster". University of Tulsa, Department of Special Collections and University Archives.
- Williams, Lee E. (1972). Anatomy of Four Race Riots: Racial Conflict in Knoxville, Elaine (Arkansas), Tulsa, and Chicago, 1919–1921. University Press of Mississippi. ISBN 978-0-87805-009-3.
- Willows, Maurice (December 31, 1921). "Disaster Relief Report Riot 1921" (PDF). Tulsa Historical Society & Museum. Archived from the original (PDF) on January 1, 2017.
- Witten, Alan; Brooks, Robert; Fenner, Thomas (June 2001). "The Tulsa Race Riot of 1921: A geophysical study to locate a mass grave". The Leading Edge. 20 (6): 655–660. Bibcode:2001LeaEd..20..655W. doi:10.1190/1.1439020.
