= List of synagogues in Oklahoma =

This is a list of Oklahoma synagogues.

== Overview ==
In 1890, the Jewish population of Oklahoma Territory was estimated to be about 100 people. By statehood in 1907, that number grew to about 1,000. The peak of Oklahoma Jewish population occurred in the 1920s with a total population of about 7,500. In 2003, 2,300 Jews resided in Oklahoma City and 2,600 in Tulsa. Reform, Conservative, and Chabad congregations serve both of these communities. In 1916 there were seven small-town congregations including Enid, Hartshorne, and Chickasha. This number has dwindled to three Reform congregations located in Muskogee, Ponca City, and Seminole, with congregational membership between fourteen and twenty-two people.

Notable Oklahoma Jews have included Oklahoma Secretary of Health and state senator Tom Adelson; historian Daniel J. Boorstin; Oklahoma State Treasurer Robert Butkin; Oklahoma City School Board and Chamber of Commerce president Seymor C. Heyman; businessman and philanthropist George Kaiser; financier Henry Kravis; actor and filmmaker Tim Blake Nelson; actor Tony Randall; and Alexander Sondheimer, Oklahoma's first court reporter. The philanthropy of Charles and Lynn Schusterman has helped to establish Tulsa's Jewish Community Center, the Judaic Studies program at the University of Oklahoma, the Center for Jewish Studies at the University of Texas, and the Israel studies program at Brandeis University.

== List of synagogues ==
| Name | Location | Movement | Status | Notes |
|---|---|---|---|---|
| Congregation B'nai Emunah | 1719 S Owasso Ave, Tulsa, 74120 | Conservative | Active | A progressive congregation committed to social activism, inclusivity, and Jewish renewal. Founded in 1916, as an Orthodox congregation. It originated from a minyan of Latvian immigrants in 1903. |
| Beth Torah Synagogue, Chabad House | 6622 S Utica Ave, Tulsa, 74136 | Chabad Lubavitch | Active | |
| Chabad Community Center for Jewish Life and Learning | 3000 W Hefner Road, Oklahoma City, 73120 | Chabad Lubavitch | Active | |
| Emanuel Synagogue | 900 NW 47th St, Oklahoma City, 73118 | Conservative | Active | Founded in 1904 |
| Hillel Jewish Student Center at OU | 494 Elm Ave, Norman, 73069 | Pluralist | Active | |
| Temple B'nai Israel | 4901 N Pennsylvania Ave, Oklahoma City, 73112 | Reform | Active | Formed in May 1903, Temple B'nai Israel is the oldest active Jewish congregation in Oklahoma. In the beginning, the congregation was run by student rabbis from Hebrew Union College, Cincinnati. Arthur Lewinsohn was elected as rabbi in 1904. Rabbi Joseph Blatt ran the congregation from 1906 to 1946, and consulted in the formation of Enid, Shawnee, Ardmore and Tulsa's congregations. From 1906 to 1916 Joseph Blatt was the only full-time rabbi in Oklahoma. Rabbi Joseph Levenson (1946–1976), Rabbi A. David Packman (1976–2004), and Rabbi Barry Cohen (2004–2012). Rabbi Vered Harris became the congregation's spiritual leader in July 2012. |
| Temple Bethahaba | 206 S 7th St, Muskogee, 74401 | Reform | Inactive | The congregation was founded in 1905 until when the temple closed in 2011. |
| Temple Emanuel | Highland & Poplar, Ponca City, 74601 | Reform | Inactive | |
| Seminole Hebrew Center | 402 W Seminole Ave, Seminole, 74868 | Reform | Inactive | |
| Temple Israel | 2004 E 22nd Pl, Tulsa, 74114 | Reform | Active | Founded in 1914; located since 1955 in a building designed by architect Percival Goodman |
| Temple Emeth | Ardmore | Reform | Inactive | Ardmore had the first Jewish community in Oklahoma to organize formally, in 1890. Temple Emeth was organized as a Reform congregation in 1907, and closed in 2004. |
| Congregation Emanuel | North Independence and East Maple, Enid | Reform | Inactive | In 5680, the congregation had 12 members of a Jewish population of 50 in Enid. The congregation was formed between 1909 and 1910. The Temple Emanuel Congregation of Enid was officially chartered in May 1911. Its founding trustees were Albert Hirsch, Harry B. Wolf, Robert Aronberg, Charles Lowenstein, Marinus Godschalk, and Herbert L. Kaufman. It was affiliated with the Union of American Hebrew Congregations from 1910 to 1919. Rabbi Joseph Blatt of Oklahoma City was their rabbi. It held services in English during festivals, and had Sabbath school. Local men's furnishings salesman, Harry B. Woolf, served as president. The congregation met at the Loewen Hotel, once located at the corner of North Independence and East Maple. The Loewen Hotel, founded by Jewish resident Al Loewen, was purchased by Milton C. Garber in 1917 and renamed the Oxford, which burned down in the 1970s. Enid also had a 20 member B'nai B'rith lodge, with Sol Newman as president. |
| B'nai Abraham | 407 Chickasha Avenue, Chickasha | | Inactive | Formed in 1915, the congregation held services in Hebrew for a Jewish population of 125. |
| B'nai Israel | Penna Avenue, Hartshorne | | Inactive | The congregation formed in 1916, held services in Hebrew. It served a Jewish population of 18. |
| Lawton/Fort Sill Jewish Community | Cache Creek chapel, Fort Sill | Pluralistic | Active | The community includes about a dozen Jewish members from Lawton and the surrounding area and a small number of Jews stationed at Fort Sill. Most services are much bigger (often 50–100) thanks to the many Basic and AIT trainees from Fort Sill who attend the Jewish chapel services (some who are Jewish, most who are not). |

== Other Jewish organizations in Oklahoma ==
| Name | Location |
|---|---|
| Jewish Federation of Tulsa | Zarrow Campus, 2021 E. 71st St, Tulsa |
| Jewish Federation of Greater Oklahoma City | 710 West Wilshire, Oklahoma City 73116 |
| Charles Schusterman Jewish Community Center | Zarrow Campus, 2021 E. 71st St, Tulsa |
| Sherwin Miller Museum of Jewish Art | Zarrow Campus, 2021 E. 71st St, Tulsa |
| Oklahoma Jewish Theatre | Oklahoma City |

== Gallery ==
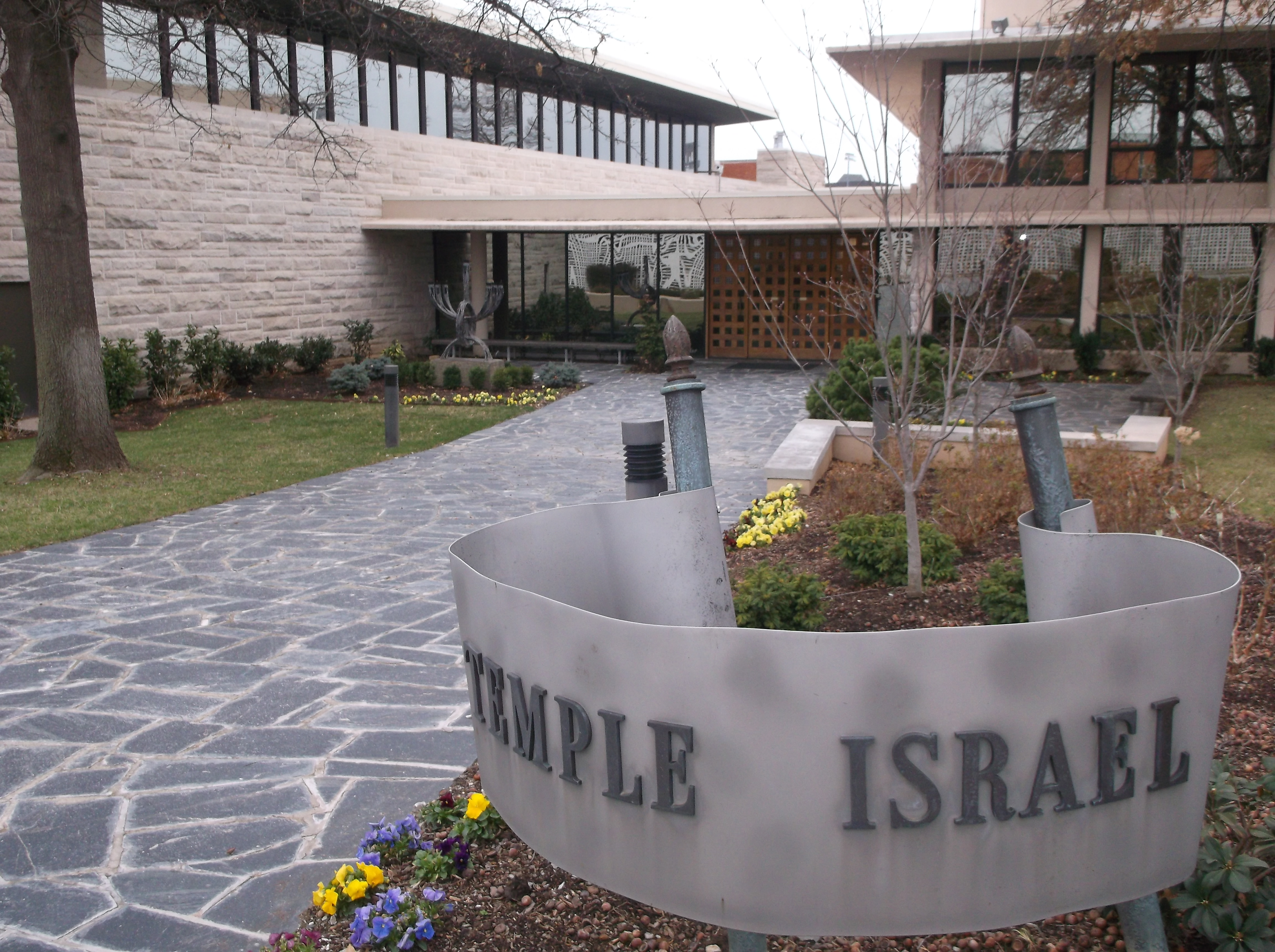
Temple Israel in Tulsa

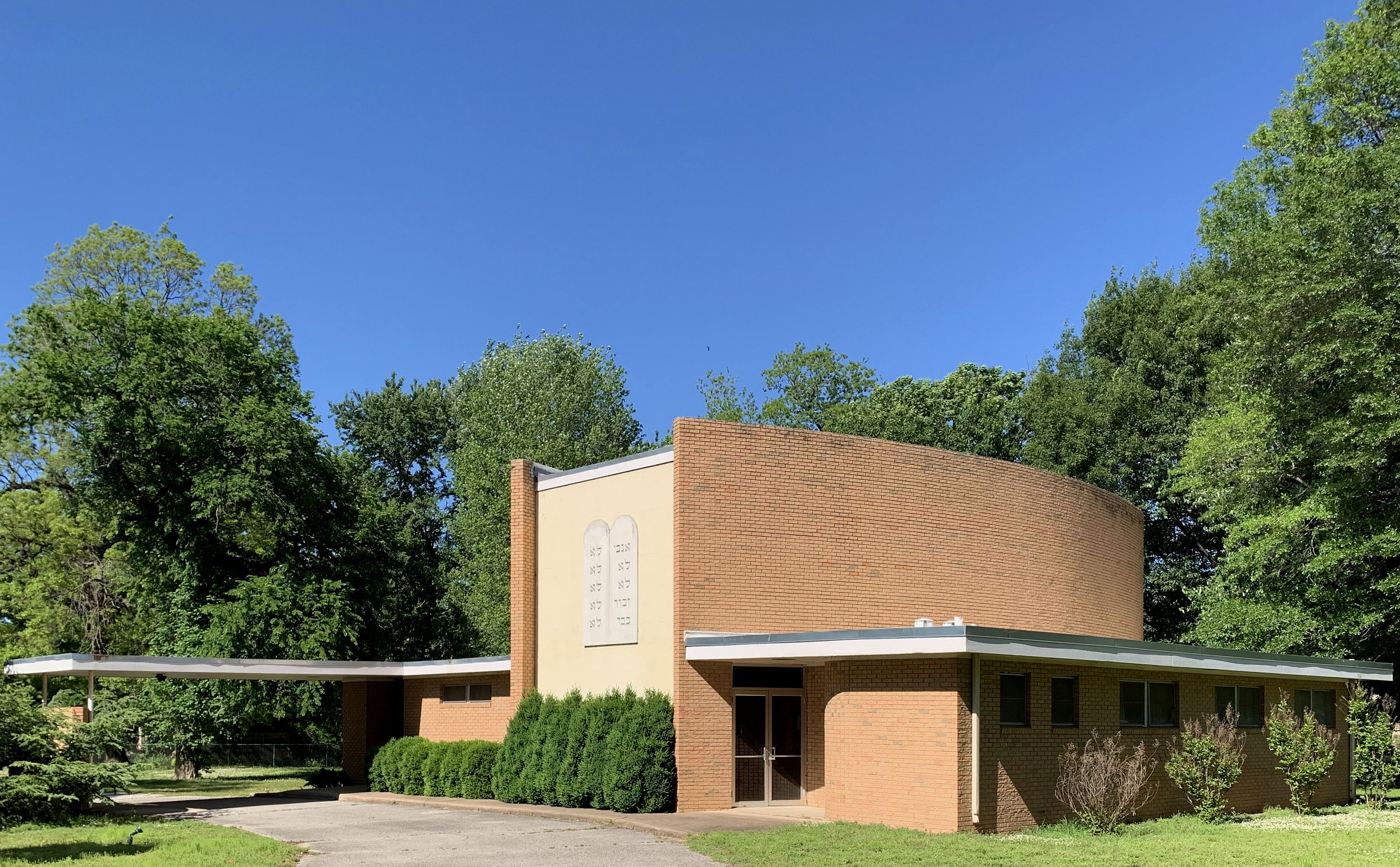
Temple Emanuel in Ponca City

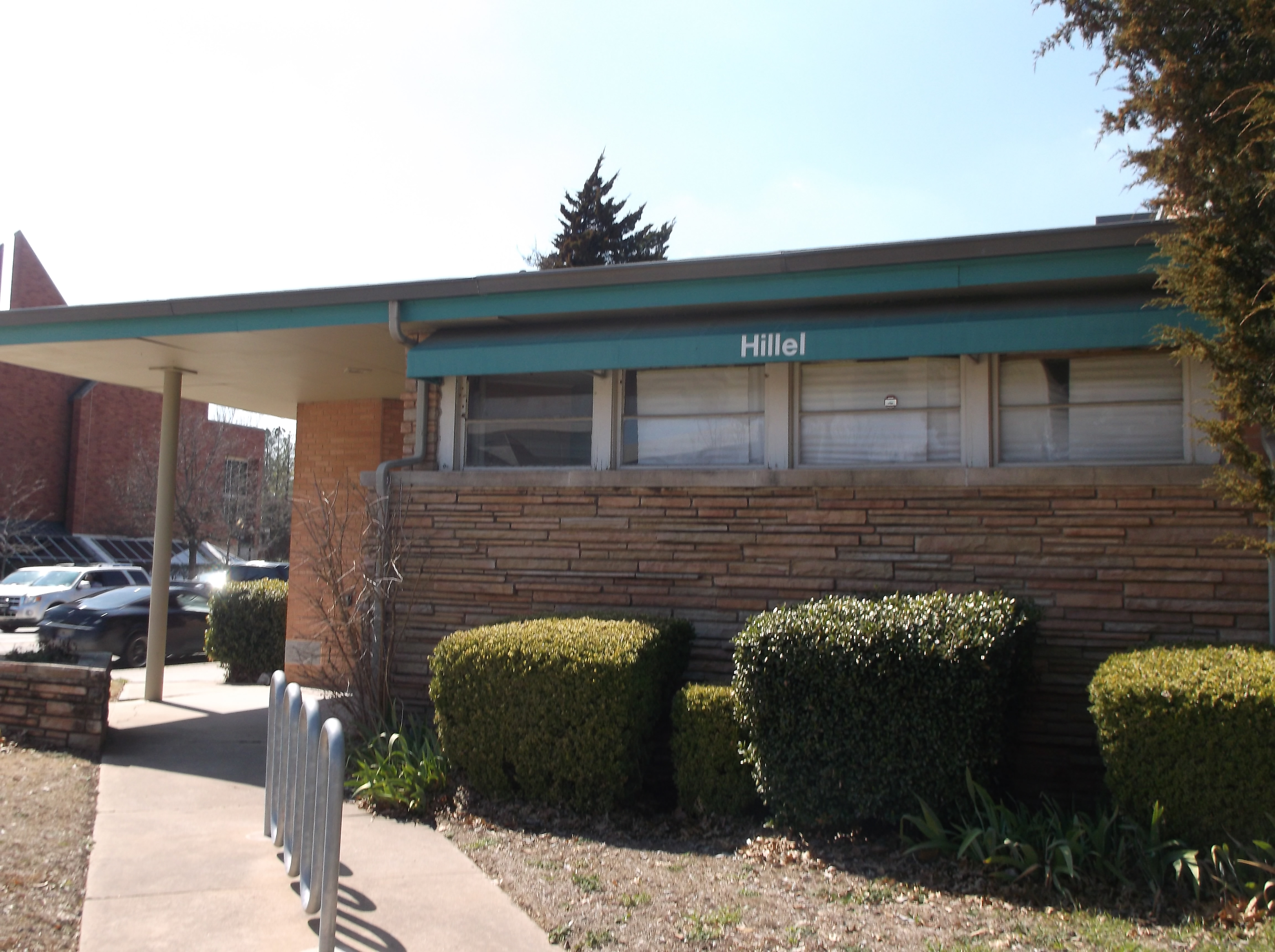
Hillel on the OU campus

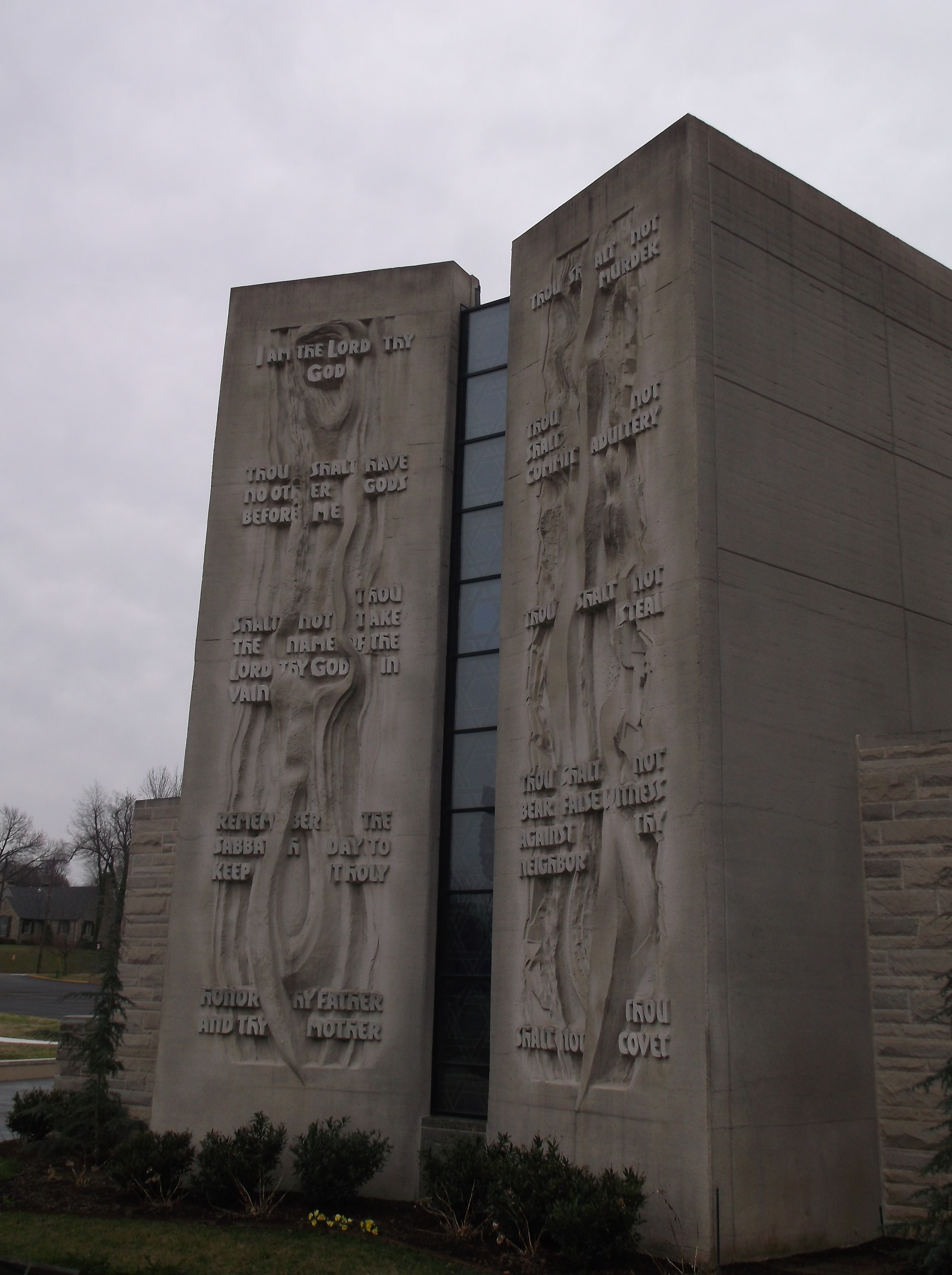
10 commandments on Temple Israel Tulsa

== See also ==
- Oldest Synagogues in the United States, Temple Emeth
