= Fire in Little Africa =

- Origin: Tulsa, Oklahoma
- Genres: Hip hop, Contemporary R&B, Poetry
- Years active: 2020-present
- Label: Motown Records
- Website: https://fireinlittleafrica.com/

Fire in Little Africa is a music and multimedia project coinciding with the 100-year anniversary of the Tulsa Race Massacre. The project is made up of more than fifty rappers, singers, producers, and creatives based in the state of Oklahoma and was partially recorded in Tulsa's Skyline Mansion, a former home to Tulsa Ku Klux Klan leader W. Tate Brady. Along with a hip-hop album, the project is also producing a series of podcasts anticipating the release and a documentary on the creation of the project to be released after the album.

Motown Records released the album on its Black Forum imprint May 28, 2021.

== Origins of Fire in Little Africa ==
The collaborative Fire in Little Africa musical project was a concept originally proposed by Woody Guthrie Center and Bob Dylan Archives manager of education and outreach Dr. Stevie Johnson, also known as Dr. View, as a way of commemorating the centennial of the Tulsa Race Massacre, honoring the resilience of Tulsa's Black Wall Street, and shedding light on the Tulsa and broader Oklahoma hip-hop communities that have long been overlooked by national audiences. Johnson's inspiration for the project came partly from his own dissertation work while completing his doctoral program at the University of Oklahoma. In addition to a written paper, Johnson recorded a hip-hop album to accompany the work. The completed project won the 2019 Bobby Wright Dissertation of the Year Award. Johnson was also inspired by the recording of Dreamville's Revenge of the Dreamers III, an organically collaborative hip-hop album recorded over 10 days in the confines of Tree Sound Studios in Atlanta, Georgia.

Johnson began by bringing influential Tulsa area artists Steph Simon and Dialtone into the fold. Simon and Dialtone worked to bring in other artists they knew who fit the mold of the project. In an interview with Rolling Stone, Simon says, "The whole point of making this album is because we need representation from people from here, people who live here, eat here, spend here."

The Fire in Little Africa album was recorded over five days and five nights at both the Greenwood Cultural Center in the heart of historic Black Wall Street and a downtown Tulsa mansion formerly owned by Tulsa Race Massacre mastermind and Ku Klux Klan leader Tate Brady. The home is now called Skyline Mansion and has been repurposed as an event space by its current owner, former NFL player and Tulsa native Felix Jones.

A documentary chronicling the creation of the project and retracing the origins of Tulsa's historic hip-hop community is due for release following the album's debut. In the first episode of the official Fire in Little Africa podcast, Johnson says of the project: "It's not even an album, it's a legacy project that is truly going to transform how people look at hip-hop and how we're truly transforming lives—trying to save black and brown folks, poor people, and people of color."

== Affiliated artists ==
More than fifty artists from Tulsa, Oklahoma City, and Lawton took part in the recording of Fire in Little Africa. This includes:

=== Executive team ===
- Dr. View, executive producer
- Steph Simon, artist lead
- Dialtone, artist lead
- St. Domonick, artist lead
- Thomas Who?, artist lead
- Chris Davis, artist manager/marketing director
- Ben Lindsey, documentarian
- Trey Thaxton, creative director

=== Other contributing artists ===
- Chasing Ryan, producer
- Verse, rapper
- Keeng Cut, rapper
- Hakeem Eli'Juwon, rapper
- Ayilla, singer
- Tizzi, rapper
- The Vampire Youth, rapper
- Parris Chariz, rapper
- M.C., rapper
- Medisin, producer
- Damion Shade, rapper
- Jarry Manna, rapper
- T-Mase, singer
- Keezy Kuts, rapper
- Young DV, rapper
- Earl Hazard, rapper
- Ausha La Cole, singer
- Bambi, rapper
- 2peece, producer
- Krisheena Suarez, singer
- 'Jimmi' Joe Burner, producer
- Playya 1000, rapper
- Sneak the Poet, documentarian & poet
- iamDES, rapper
- Lester Shaw, singer
- Creo, singer
- The GRAE, rapper
- Shyheim, rapper
- Omaley B, singer
- Papa, producer
- Jay Mizz, rapper
- Foolie Foolie, rapper
- Tea Rush, singer
- Savvy Kray, rapper
- Sterling Matthews, poet
- Jabee, rapper
- Doc Free, host
- Deezy, rapper
- Jacobi Ryan, rapper
- SoufWessDes, rapper
- Seriously K5ive, producer
- Jacc Spade, producer
- Original Flow, rapper
- Ray June, rapper
- Xanvas, producer
- Ali Shaw, host
- Beetyman, rapper
- Tony Foster Jr., singer
- Sid Carter, rapper
- Malachi Burgess, producer
- NOLO, producer
- WoRm, producer
- Deeksta, producer
- 4wop, rapper
- Bezel 365, rapper

== Motown Records ==
On April 5, 2021, Motown Records announced it would release the Fire in Little Africa album on its Black Forum imprint in conjunction with Tulsa's Bob Dylan Center and Woody Guthrie Center. It will be the first new release by Black Forum since the label's official relaunch in February 2021.

Motown Records Chairman & CEO Ethiopia Habtemariam said she was honored to have Fire in Little Africa on the label and called the album "a powerful and timely project that provides a platform and outlet for the incredibly talented and thriving music community of Tulsa, Oklahoma."
