= Steph Simon =

African American artist from Tulsa, Oklahoma

Stephon Simon (born November 4, 1987), better known by his stage name Steph Simon, is an American hip hop artist, festival director, and educator from Tulsa, Oklahoma.

== Early life ==
Simon grew up on Tulsa's historically Black north side. He attended Hawthorne Elementary where he had the opportunity to explore the arts early on by taking ballet, acting, and eventually choir classes. One of his first performances was at a Juneteenth Black rodeo. Simon later attended Central High School as an athlete playing football, but after his parents' divorce moved to East Tulsa and transferred to Union High School where he continued playing football and later graduated.

== Career ==
Simon has been instrumental in crafting Tulsa's hip hop scene.

After graduating and investing money from his day job into his rapping career, Simon began touring with local acts like Johnny Polygon. Simon has independently released several albums titled or primarily focused on the present, past, and future of Black Wall Street. He frequently has releases under the alias "Dicky Ro" based on notable Greenwood resident Dick Rowland whose alleged affair with Sarah Page played a distinct and sensational role in inciting the white mob that carried out the 1921 Tulsa Race Massacre.

Rolling Stone said of his style:

"He flows with cool confidence over producer Dr. View’s jazzy instrumental, promising to “paint pictures over rhythms, make your soul shiver” and then doing just that with a series of vivid similes: “Like a fresh pair of penny loafers with the polish on it, tell ’em keep on shining/Like a diamond on your pinky when you’re sipping pinot grigi’, tell ’em keep on shining.” It’s a charismatic performance, full of easy charm and unhurried wit."

Grammy noted his ability to paint a scene:

"Steph Simon’s Born On Black Wall Street and Visions From the Tisdale supply residents and newcomers with audio roadmaps to help them navigate through every neighborhood within the city."

=== Dreamland/World Culture Fest ===
In 2016 Simon organized the World Culture Music Festival. World Culture was primarily a hip hop focused music festival dedicated to local and regional acts with national headliners. The festival had run for six years when Simon changed the name of the festival to the Dreamland Festival based on the historic Black owned theater built in 1914 in the original Greenwood district by early community builders John and Loula Williams.

The Tulsa World awarded Simon as a "Tulsan of the Year" in 2024 saying of his efforts to build the rap scene in Tulsa: "What was originally conceived as a way to give local musicians a chance to share their work with a larger audience has evolved over the years into the region’s largest hip-hop festival, featuring national and local musical talent, guest speakers and panel conversations, film screenings and other activities."

=== Tulsa McLain Records (TMC Records) ===
In 2019, Simon worked with local North side school McLain High School to teach a production, writing, performance, and industry course in hip hop for McLain students. The program also includes a record label, TMC Records which releases participants' tracks, compilations, and cyphers to streaming services. Each graduating class has performed at Simon's Dreamland Festival.

== Fire In Little Africa ==
Simon's history of making music in and about Greenwood led to a call from Dr. Stevie Johnson, a manager at the Bob Dylan Archives Center, Woody Guthrie Center, and an initial progenitor for a conceptual album commemorating the centennial of the 1921 Tulsa Race Massacre. The project came to be known as Fire In Little Africa. Dr. Johnson invited Simon to be an artist lead and executive producer of the project to help coordinate a coalition of Oklahoma rappers, musicians and artists.

Fire in Little Africa was released through a relaunch of Motown Records' Black Forum imprint, which was originally famed for releasing speeches and spoken word works from the civil rights era by figures such as Martin Luther King Jr. and Stokely Carmichael.
