= Norman Music Festival =

Coordinates: 35°13′16″N 97°26′35″W

- Genre: Various
- Locations: Downtown Norman, Oklahoma, U.S.
- Years active: 2008 - present
- Website: http://www.normanmusicfestival.com/

Norman Music Festival (NMF) is an annual, large, 3-day music festival in downtown Norman, Oklahoma. Each year it highlights performances from many different genres of music. NMF encompasses approximately 12 indoor venues and 4 outdoor stages with acts performing throughout the days and nights. Founded in 2008, it has grown to include food and art from local vendors. The festival, which is free to the public, draws more than 70,000 visitors and generates approximately $3.5M in economic impact. NMF takes place on the final full weekend of April, and showcases approximately 300 original material performances from a mix of Local and Internationally acclaimed acts.

Festival History: NMF was initially conceptualized in 2007 by the Norman Arts Council (NAC) and a group of local music enthusiasts, with the inaugural festival taking place a year later in April 2008. The festival continued as a project of the NAC for 3 more years before becoming a standalone nonprofit entity in 2012. The Norman Music Alliance nonprofit produced the festival going forward, initially as a fully volunteer run entity. In 2018 the nonprofit hired a part time Executive Director and has continued as an administrated/volunteer entity since.

== Festival Headliners ==
2008 - The Polyphonic Spree, Chainsaw Kittens, British Sea Power, The Octopus Project, plus 32 more acts.

2009 - Of Montreal, Starlight Mints, Man Man, Tea Leaf Green, plus 93 more acts.

2010 - Dirty Projectors, Leon Russell, Electric Six, The Sword, plus 217 more acts.

2011 - The Walkmen, Black Joe Lewis & The Honeybears, Ty Segall, Keller Williams, plus 241 more acts.

2012 - Portugal. The Man, Other Lives, Jacob Fred Jazz Odyssey, Hayes Carll, plus 287 more acts.

2013 - The Joy Formidable, Big Sam's Funky Nation, King Khan & BBQ Show, JD McPherson, plus 228 more acts.

2014 - Bright Light Social Hour, Dead Meadow, Diarrhea Planet, John Moreland, plus 317 more acts.

2015 - Ra Ra Riot, Natalie Prass, Lee Bains & Glory Fires, Johnny Polygon, plus 331 more acts.

2016 - Cloud Nothings, Small Black, Open Mike Eagle, Milo (R.A.P. Ferreira), plus 365 more acts.

2017 - Thee Oh Sees, Oddisee & Good Compny, Japanese Breakfast, Low Cut Connie plus 310 more acts.

2018 - Tune-Yards, Mothica, Suuns, Mike Hosty, plus 356 more acts.

2019 - Beach Fossils, Black Milk with band Nat Turner, Omar Apollo, Big Business, plus 335 more acts.

2020 - No Festival due to COVID

2021 - No Festival due to COVID

2022 - The Drums, DIIV, ...And You Will Know Us By The Trail of Dead, Jabee, plus 243 more acts.

2023 - Illuminati Hotties, Acid Mothers Temple, Soul Glo, Black Belt Eagle Scout, plus 256 more acts.

2024 - Alvvays (partial festival cancellation due to extreme tornado risk), Moor Mother, Blondshell, plus 235 more acts.

2025 - La Luz, Apollo Brown, Being Dead, Levitation Room, The Mystery Lights, plus 228 more acts.

2026 - Scheduled April 23-25 with Momma, Cure For Paranoia, Evening Elephants, Husbands, Kid Lennon, Ben Quad, Stepmom, and 100s more.

== See also ==
- Woody Guthrie Folk Festival
- Rocklahoma
- Oklahoma International Bluegrass Festival
- Dusk Til Dawn Blues Festival
- OK Mozart Festival
- Diversafest
- List of music festivals
