= Union Public Schools =

Public school district in Tulsa, Oklahoma

Coordinates: 36°04′29″N 95°52′56″W

Location
- 8506 East 61st Street; Tulsa, Oklahoma 74133 United States

District information
- Type: Public, Independent
- Motto: Together We Make a Difference
- Grades: PK–12
- Established: 1919
- Superintendent: Dr. John Federline
- Budget: $187,621,439

Students and staff
- Students: 15,700
- Teachers: 991
- Staff: 948

Other information
- Website: www.unionps.org

Union Public Schools is a public school district located in southeast Tulsa, and northwest Broken Arrow, Oklahoma. The school district is the eighth-largest in Oklahoma. Union Public Schools accredited by the Oklahoma State and is notable among school districts in the area because Union does not encompass a particular city.

Union Public Schools operates in four major areas: early childhood education, Community Schools programs, college and career programs through such programs as Union Career Connect, concurrent college tuition programs, Early College High School and student internships through partnerships with area business and the City of Tulsa and STEM (Science, Technology, Engineering and Math.)

== History ==
Union began with its formation in 1919 when four rural communities – Alsuma, Boles, Mayo and McCollough – consolidated. The school's first graduating class consisted of just four students, and all classes (K-12) were housed in a two-story brick building. Beginning in the 1980s, Tulsa's residential and commercial population boomed, and its population grew with it. Today, Union Public Schools serves more than 15,700 students in its 19 schools, including the Rosa Parks Early Childhood Education Center and the Union Alternative School. Other facilities include the Union Multipurpose Activities Center or UMAC, the Union High School Performing Arts Center, the Union Collegiate Academy (a new wing added to the High School) which houses the Catherine E. Burden College & Career Center, the Union U-Wear Spirit Store, the Y at Union fitness center, and a new Union Innovation Lab finished in 2020.

In December 2002, the school received a demand from the University of Miami that it stop using a "split-U" logo, which Miami alleged was unacceptably similar to the university's trademarked logo. In January 2003, Union settled Miami's claim by agreeing to pay $9,599 per year for the continuing right to use the split-U logo.

Union's use of the "Redskins" team name has exposed it to some criticism, similar to the controversy faced by other schools using mascots referring to Native Americans. In November 2003 the school board voted unanimously to keep the "Redskins" name. In the 2020–2021 school year, the Redskins name was formally retired, and in the 2021–2022 school year, the Redhawks was chosen as a new mascot name.

Union's newest elementary, Ellen Ochoa Elementary, which opened in stages beginning in 2017, features a new Community Health Connection clinic which opens in 2020, incorporated as part of the Community School Village concept.

== Schools ==
Union Public Schools comprises 19 schools.

=== Elementary schools ===
Union Public Schools has 14 elementary school sites and one Early Childhood Center, which serves 3-year-old students:

- Andersen Elementary, built in 1984 and named after Hans M. Andersen, an early land owner and dairy farmer who provided the district with free water before it was available from the city.
- Boevers Elementary, built in 1975 and named after George F. Boevers, a 35-year veteran of the district. Their mascot is Boever Bobcats. It also has a choir, named the Boevers Boppers.
- Briarglen Elementary opened in 1970 and named after the housing edition in which it was built. Closed in 2017.
- Cedar Ridge Elementary, completed in 1995 and named after the area in which it was built.
- Roy Clark Elementary, built in 1977 and named for musician and entertainer Roy Clark. The school mascot is Clark Cowboys. It also has its own choir, the "Clark Chorale". William Sides won the 1st Roy Clark Glasses Award at Clark Elementary. The Librarian, Bailey Sawyer, is the current holder of the Golden Apple.
- Darnaby Elementary, named after James R. Darnaby, opened in January 1980, after its students were temporarily housed in a wing of the Tulsa Public Schools. Their mascot is known as the Darnaby Rangers.
- Grove Elementary, opened in 1975, and named after Robert B. Grove, a science teacher and basketball coach who had served with Union since 1945. He was Union's superintendent from 1960 to 1975. The school mascot is Grove Eagles. It also has its own choir, "Eagleaires"
- Jarman Elementary, opened on August 21, 1991, named after Wesley V. Jarman, a former superintendent who served with the district from 1975 to 1990. Its slogan is "Coming together is a beginning. Keeping together is progress. Working together is success". The students are known as the Patriots.
- Jefferson Elementary, named for the third President of the United States, Thomas Jefferson, and opened in the 2008–2009 school year. Students are known as the Jefferson Explorers.
- McAuliffe Elementary, built in 1988 and named in honor of teacher Christa McAuliffe, who died in the Space Shuttle Challenger accident. The school's motto is "We challenge the future", and students are called "Challengers".
- Moore Elementary, opened in the fall of 2000, and named for one of the district's first board members, Marshall T. Moore
- Peters Elementary, opened in 1978, and named after Tom W. Peters, the founder of Oklahoma Greenhouses who served on the Union board of education for 16 years. Peters is home of the Panthers.
- Rosa Parks Elementary which is named for the famous civil rights activist, Rosa Parks, opened in 2006.
- Rosa Parks Early Childhood Center, in cooperation with the Tulsa Community Action Project, opened in 2007. it serves 3-year-old children. The center is considered as a separate school.
- Ellen Ochoa Elementary School, built in 2017

=== Secondary schools ===
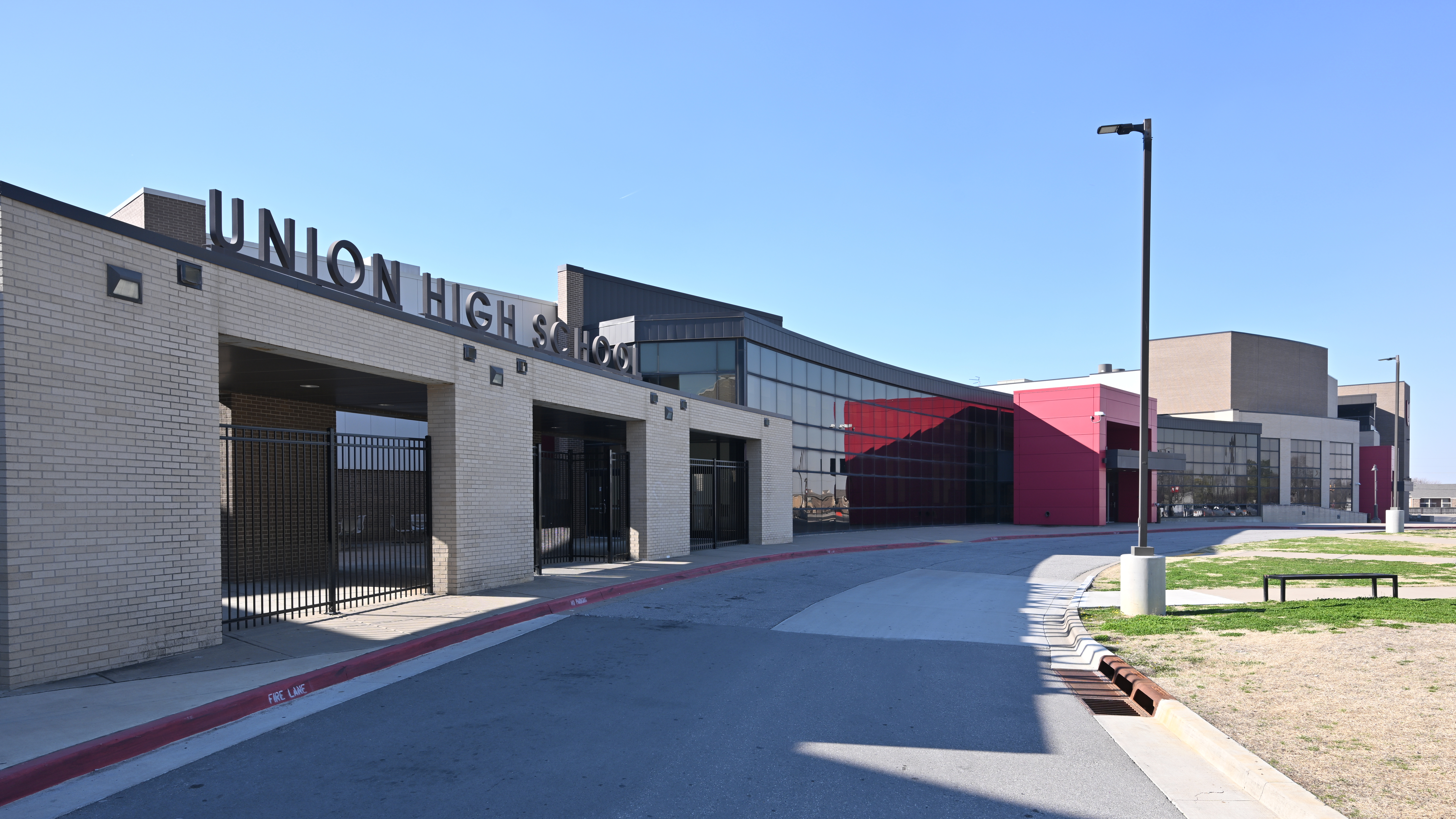
Union High School

Union Public Schools has five secondary schools, including an alternative school:

- Union 6th/7th Grade Center is located on 61st street. The first phase of the school, the Union Seventh Grade Center, was completed in 1993. The Sixth Grade Center was finished the following year. The school serves both sixth and seventh graders. Both grades are divided into "teams" or "pods" (sixth and seventh grade teams are named after colleges) to make them feel more at home and less intimidated by the large size of the school. Each team consists of a core group of teachers and 140 students.
- Union 8th Grade Center (former 7th Grade Center and originally built as Union Junior High) is designed to ease the transition between middle school and high school. Is currently out of construction, with brand-new hallways, media center, an extension to the commons, and a new science department.
- Union High School Freshman Academy, formerly called the Union 9th Grade Center, was built in 1989, houses ninth graders. It was originally designated as Union Junior High, which would house the eighth and ninth graders. In 1993, the district's secondary configuration changed, and the building was renamed to its other previous name, the intermediate high school. it was officially renamed the Union High School Freshman Academy in 2019. In May 2022, Union Public Schools finished a 6,500-square-foot indoor golf facility at the Freshman Academy. It has putting bays, a simulator, practice turf, locker rooms, offices, a lounge, and storage. Outdoors, there is a putting green, sand bunker, and fencing.
- Union Alternative School was created to better meet the needs of Union students who have been unsuccessful in the regular education program. Students from seventh through 12th grades are enrolled in the program housed at 5656 S. 129 E. Ave.
- Union High School, built in 1972, is known for its arts and athletics programs. Its football team, the Union Redhawks, is regarded as one of the best in the nation. The three-story Union Collegiate Academy wing, which also houses the Catherine E. Burden College & Career Center, was completed in 2012 focuses on college and career-oriented programs.

== Adult and community education ==
The district also offers a community education program through the Union Adult Learning Center which serves as the “umbrella” for a variety of programs offered in the Green Country area including Tulsa, Broken Arrow and Muskogee. These programs include adult classes such as GED classes, English as a Second Language and more, are funded by the Oklahoma State Department of Education and community programs for both adults and children. Some programs are offered at no cost, others at a nominal fee.

Adult Basic Education (ABE)

GED Preparation classes are provided for adults who are no longer attending high school and need basic skills instruction in reading, writing, math, and life skills.

GED and Career Certification Exams

Passing the General Educational Development or GED test qualifies adults to receive a high school diploma issued by the State of Oklahoma. Exams for certification in the fields of Health, IT, Education, and more are also available.

English as a Second Language

English as a Second Language or ESL classes provide instruction to non-English speaking adults. Students learn communication and assimilation skills in order to be productive citizens.
