= Union High School (Tulsa, Oklahoma) =

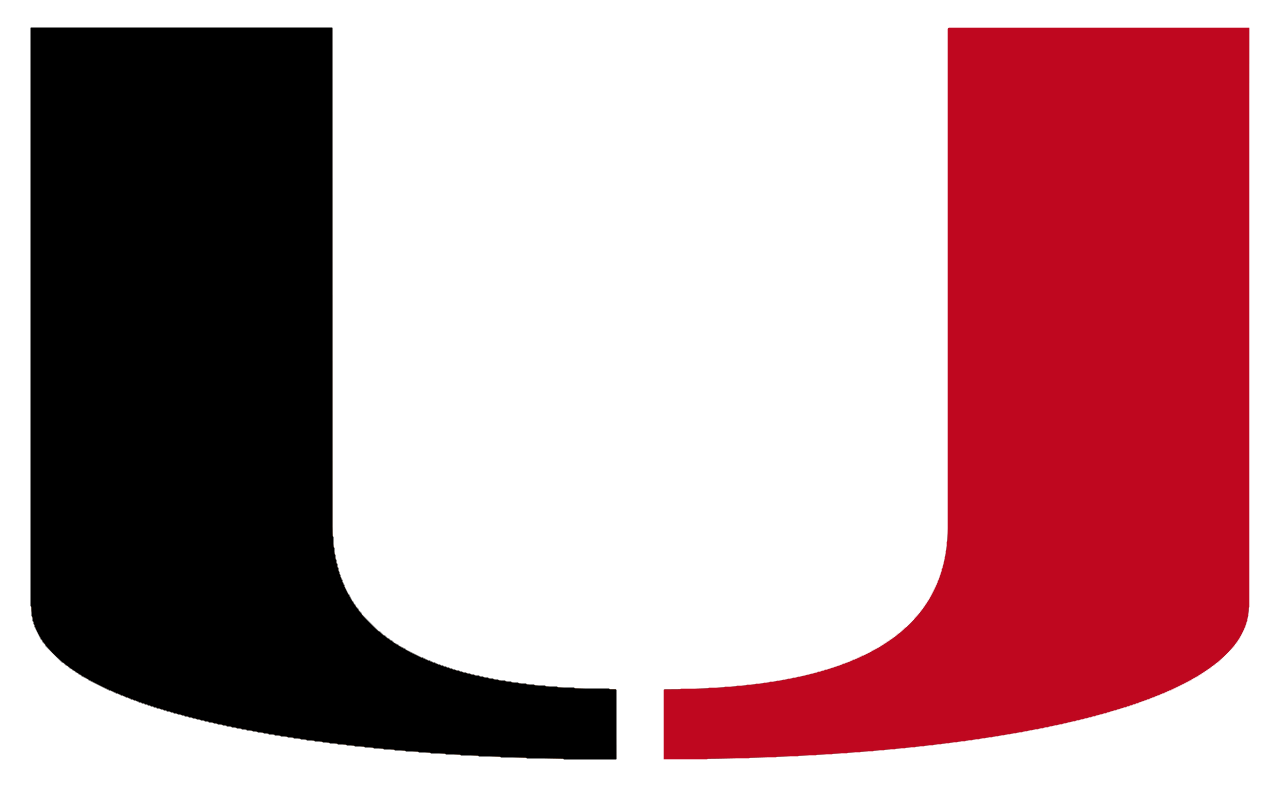

Location
- 6636 S. Mingo Road; Tulsa, Oklahoma 74133; United States; 36°04′00″N 95°52′14″W

Information
- Type: Public school
- Established: 1972
- Locale: Suburban
- Principal: 12th grade: John Chargois 11th grade: Marla Robinson 10th grade: Tony Tempest
- Teaching staff: 156.84 (FTE)
- Grades: 10–12
- Enrollment: 3,516 (2023–2024)
- Student to teacher ratio: 22.42
- Colors: Red, black, and white
- Mascot: Redhawks
- District: Union Public Schools
- Website: uhs.unionps.org

Union High School is the highest level of secondary education in the Union Public Schools system of Tulsa and Broken Arrow, Oklahoma, for students in 10th, 11th and 12th grades. The school, combined with Union Freshman Academy, is the second-largest high school in the state of Oklahoma, behind only Broken Arrow High School.

== History ==
Tulsa's first public school opened in 1884. The Union school district was formed in 1919 when four rural community districts consolidated.

== Curriculum ==
In addition to providing typical academic courses in English, mathematics and science, Union High School offers an Oklahoma social studies course as required by state law.

All Oklahoma high schools must provide a physical education course designed to provide a minimum of 150 minutes of physical education per week, unless provided an exemption by the Oklahoma State Department of Education due to undue hardship.

Union High School has State Department of Education and North Central Association accreditation.

== Extracurricular activities ==
=== Athletics ===
Union High School fields 22 athletics teams. The Redhawks and Lady Redhawks have won 65 state championships in their history as recognized by the Secondary Schools Athletic Association.

The following is a list of the sports in which the school competes, as well as the years, if any, during which the school's team won the state championship:

- Baseball – 7 (1979, 1989, 1990, 2005, 2006, 2010, 2018)
- Boys' basketball – 3 (2004, 2012, 2014)
- Girls' basketball – 1 (2008)
- Ice hockey – 2 (2004, 2005)
- Cheerleading – 4 (1990, 2007, 2011, 2013)
- Pom – 11 (2003–2012, 2018, 2019) and the highest winning team at UDA in 2004
- Highsteppers (dance drill team)- 33 (1980–2008, 2012, 2014–2016)
- Boys' cross country – 3 (2007, 2008, 2010)
- Girls' cross country – 7 (1976, 1977, 1978, 1979, 1980, 1981, 2005)
- Fastpitch softball – 4 (1976, 1992, 1999, 2011)
- Football – 9 (1963, 2002, 2004, 2005, 2008, 2009, 2010, 2011, 2016)
- Boys' golf – 0
- Girls' golf – 4 (2011, 2012, 2013, 2014)
- Slowpitch softball – 10 (2010, 2013)
- Boys' soccer – 4 (1995, 1998, 2005, 2007, 2018)
- Girls' soccer – 3 (2007, 2008, 2015)
- Boys' swimming – 1 (2012)
- Girls' swimming – 0
- Boys' tennis – 4 (2005, 2006, 2007, 2008)
- Boys' track – 2 (2008, 2009)
- Girls' track – 5 (2003, 2005, 2006, 2007, 2010)
- Volleyball – 0
- Wrestling – 4 (Team State: 1982, 2009, Dual State: 2007, 2012)

=== Music and arts ===
- Visual Arts
- Vocal Music
- Speech/Debate
- Music Theory/Technology
- Instrumental Music
- Drama
- Mass Media
- Show Choir
- Orchestra
- The Union High School Marching Band The Renegade Regiment is an eleven-time Bands of America Grand National Finalist, a two-time BOA Regional Champion, an 18-time BOA Regional finalist and a 12-time OBA State Champion. The band has won numerous awards, including:
- Bands of America Grand Nationals ~ Finalist

1981 (Summer National Championships) / 1986 / 1989 / 1990 / 1995 / 1998 / 2000 / 2010 / 2011 / 2014 / 2017 / 2019

The band's winter percussion and guard ensembles have earned multiple awards on a national level competing at WGI events.

- Winter Guard International Championships ~ Scholastic World Champions

1985/ 1987 / 1988,
Finalist 1984 / 1986 / 1994

- Winter Guard International Championships ~ SA or SO Finalist

1996 / 2001 / 2010,
Semi-Finalist 2011

- Winter Guard International Percussion Championships ~

Scholastic World Marching – Finalist 1995 / 1997,
Scholastic Open Concert – Champion 2001

== Mascot controversy ==
Union's use of the "Redskins" team name has exposed it to some criticism, similar to the controversy faced by other schools using mascots referring to Native Americans. In 1999, Cherokee Nation chief Chad "Corntassel" Smith criticized the school's use of the name. In December 2002, the school received a demand from the University of Miami that it stop using a "split-U' logo which Miami claimed was unacceptably similar to the university's trademarked logo. Some Native American groups saw this as an appropriate time to renew their calls to pressure Union to abandon the Redskins name, since it appeared that the school would have to change its uniforms in any event. However, in January 2003, Union settled Miami's claim by agreeing to pay $1,000 per year for the continuing right to use the split-U logo. In November 2003 the school board voted unanimously to keep the "Redskins" name. Since that time the school had maintained its position despite continued protests and proposed legislation intended to change the name. In July 2020, following an announcement by the Washington Redskins that their ownership would review its name, the Union school board announced it would also reevaluate the district's mascot. In November 2020, The Union school board voted unanimously to no longer use the old mascot and logo and eventually settled upon using a Redhawk mascot and logo.

== Notable alumni ==
- Brent Albright, professional wrestler
- Taylor Armstrong, reality TV personality from The Real Housewives of Beverly Hills; originally Shana Hughes, cheerleader and 1989 graduate
- Tre Brown, football defensive back for NFL's Seattle Seahawks
- Kyle Crutchmer, former wrestler and current Bellator mixed martial artist
- Daz Dillinger, rap artist and producer.
- Melinda Doolittle, singer, third place finalist on American Idol in 2007
- Dominique Franks, football cornerback for Atlanta Falcons, 2010–13
- Justin Fuente, former Oklahoma Sooners quarterback and former head football coach for the Virginia Tech Hokies
- Wesam Keesh, American actor
- Jeff Leiding, football linebacker for Indianapolis Colts, 1986–1987
- Steve Logan, offensive coordinator for the Louisville Kings since 2026,NFL assistant coach, East Carolina head coach 1992–2002 and Boston College offensive coordinator 2007–2009; assistant coach at Union High, 1974–79
- Zac Mabry, actor from The Little Rascals
- Isaiah McGuire, NFL defensive end for the Cleveland Browns
- John Moreland, singer-songwriter
- Myron Noodleman, baseball clown, stage name of former Union High School math teacher and football coach Rick Hader
- Dari Nowkhah, ESPN sportscaster
- Julián Rebolledo, voice actor
- Jake Spavital, Texas State University, Head Football Coach
- Steph Simon, African American hip hop musician
- Ricky Stromberg, American football player
- Tress Way, American football player
