= Everything's Gonna Be All White =

- Genre: Television documentary
- Created by: Sacha Jenkins
- Written by: Sacha Jenkins
- Starring: See below
- Country of origin: United States
- No. of episodes: 4

Production
- Executive producer: Sacha Jenkins
- Running time: 55-60 minutes

Original release
- Network: Showtime
- Release: February 11 – March 4, 2022

Everything's Gonna Be All White is an American documentary television series that premiered on Showtime on February 11, 2022.

== Overview ==
The series released a trailer, featuring a trigger warning that says, "Warning: This Trailer May Trigger White People". The series featured interviews, discussing the experiences of people of color and events such as the 2021 United States Capitol attack, Indian reservations, colonialism, systemic racism and blackface. Amanda Seales, who was cast in the series, said that the series will discuss white fragility.

The series aired in three parts, with a fourth (bonus) episode made only available to Showtime on Demand subscribers.

In a Zoom interview, Sacha Jenkins said that he had been working on the series since around the time of the 2021 United States Capitol attack.

== Cast ==
- Amanda Seales
- Jemele Hill
- Ibram X. Kendi
- Styles P
- Tamika Mallory
- Nell Irvin Painter
- Favianna Rodriguez
- Nick Estes
- Margaret Cho
- Linda Sarsour
- Carmen Perez

== Episodes ==
This is a caption
No.	Title	Original release date
1	"White Lies Matter"	February 11, 2022
2	"White Colour Crime"	February 18, 2022
3	"White Noize"	February 25, 2022
4	"Everything's Not Gonna Be All White"	March 4, 2022

== Reception ==
The series has received significant backlash on social media, with many accusing the series of causing divide among Americans and promoting anti-white racism. TheGrio ranked the series as one of the top ten films to watch during Black History Month. According to a report by TheGrio, the series received both positive and negative feedback. Vivienne Germain, a writer for The Harvard Crimson reviewed the series, saying the series lacked depth in the way it discussed racial issues. Daniel Finberg, a television critic for The Hollywood Reporter also reviewed the series, saying the bonus episode outshined the rest of the series. Joe Berkowitz, an opinion columnist with Fast Company compared the series to the film Memento.
