= Amanda Seales =

American podcaster and actress (born 1981)

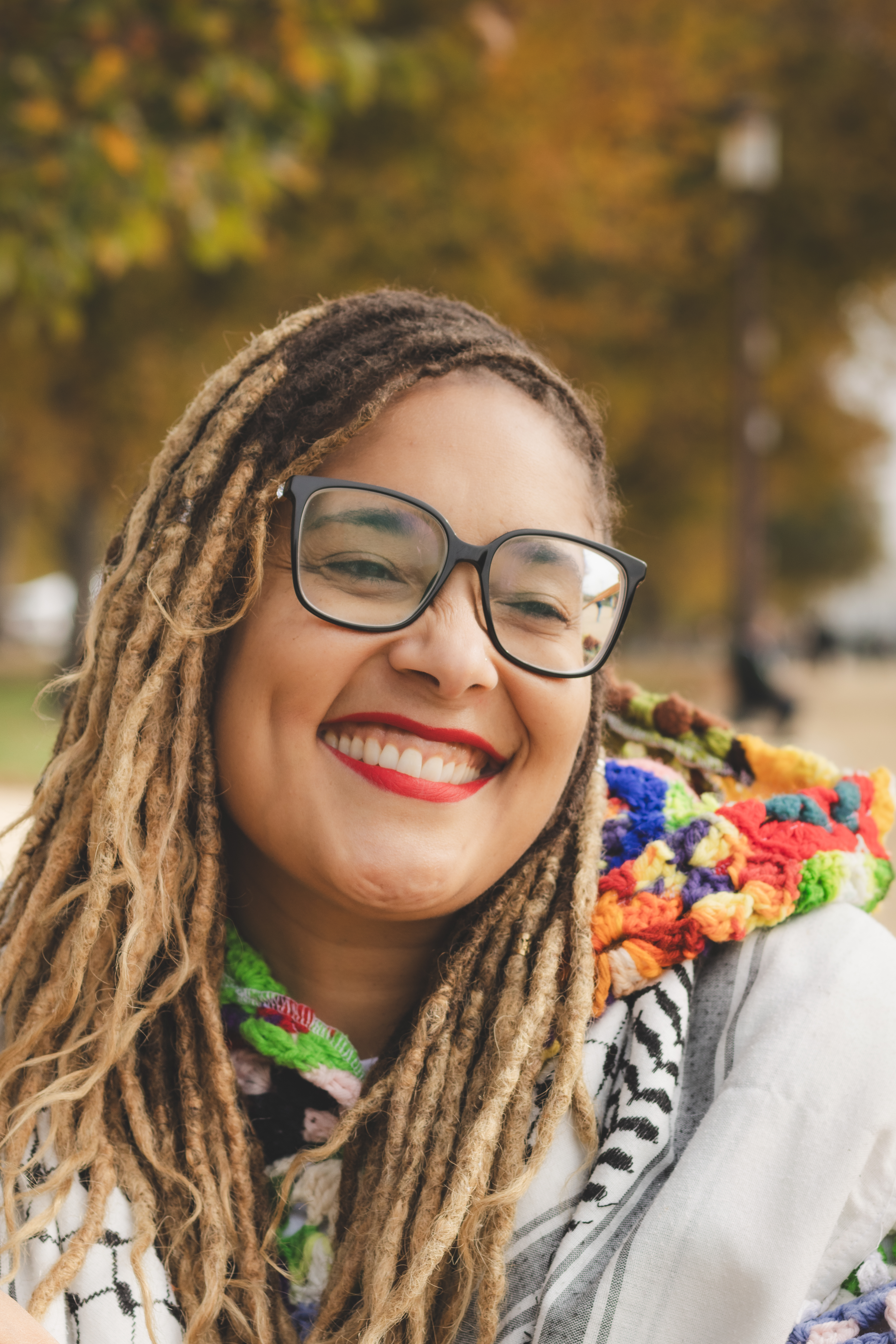
- Seales in 2025
- Born: Amanda Ingrid Seales; July 1, 1981 (age 45); Inglewood, California, U.S.
- Education: State University of New York, Purchase (BA); Columbia University (MA)
- Occupations: Actor; comedian; poet; media personality; podcaster; author

Comedy career
- Medium: Television; film; music; radio
- Genre: Stand-up comedy
- Website: amandaseales.com

Amanda Ingrid Seales (born July 1, 1981), formerly known by the stage names Amanda Diva and Mendacious D, is a Grenadian-American actress. From 2017 to 2021, she played a supporting role in the HBO comedy series Insecure. In 2019, HBO released her first stand-up comedy special, I Be Knowin. Then, in 2020, Seales launched Smart Funny & Black, a comedy gameshow that showcases Black culture, history, and experience. Seales was also one of the co-hosts of the syndicated daytime talk show, The Real.

== Early life ==
Amanda Ingrid Seales was born in Inglewood, California, on July 1, 1981. Her mother was born and raised in Mt. Moritz, Grenada. As a result, both she and her mother are dual citizens of the US and Grenada. Seales has publicly discussed that she was the product of her parents' brief sexual encounter while her mother was married but seeking separation. Her father is a Black American physician from Roxbury, Boston with whom Seales has had minimal contact throughout her life though she has appeared in at least one podcast episode with her half sister, his daughter. Seales moved to Orlando, Florida, in 1989, where she later attended Dr. Phillips High School. She was asked to leave her conservatory program after her freshman year at SUNY-Purchase, and it is unclear how she was readmitted. She went on to graduate from the university. She then earned a one-year terminal master's degree in African American studies with an independent study concentration in hip-hop from Columbia University.

== Career ==
=== Film and television ===
Seales's first film was a minor role as Katy in the 1993 movie Cop and a Half. The next year Seales was featured on the Nickelodeon sitcom My Brother and Me (1994) as Deonne Wilburn. In 2002 she appeared on Russell Simmons' Def Poetry Jam. Seales became publicly known as "VJ Amanda Diva" on MTV2 Sucker Free Countdown on Sundays. In 2016 she appeared in a recurring role on the HBO series Insecure as Tiffany DuBois. Also in 2016, Seales began hosting her own show on truTV called Greatest Ever.

On January 26, 2019, HBO debuted her first stand-up comedy special I Be Knowin'. Bring the Funny is a comedy competition series that premiered on July 9, 2019, on NBC. Seales hosts, alongside judges Kenan Thompson, Chrissy Teigen, and Jeff Foxworthy.

Throughout 2019, Seales served as a frequent guest host for the syndicated daytime talk show The Real. On January 6, 2020, Seales was promoted from guest co-host to permanent co-host. She departed the series after six months of co-hosting. Seales insisted in multiple interviews that the departure was her choice and based on her personal principles, but producers did not renew her contract. In September 2020, Seales accused The Real of borrowing ideas from her show Smart Funny & Black, saying a segment titled "Black Lives Matter University" featured a logo that closely resembled Smart Funny & Black's emblem.

In June 2020, Seales hosted the BET Awards 2020. In February 2022, Seales was cast in the three-part documentary series Everything's Gonna Be All White, airing on Showtime.

In August 2025, Seales appeared in a Jubilee video debating 20 Black conservatives. In the debate, she argued for reparations for slavery, against the overpolicing and underfunding of Black communities, and explained the existence of systemic racism.

In August 2026, Seales said she retired and "divested" from Hollywood and her career in the entertainment industry.

=== Other work ===
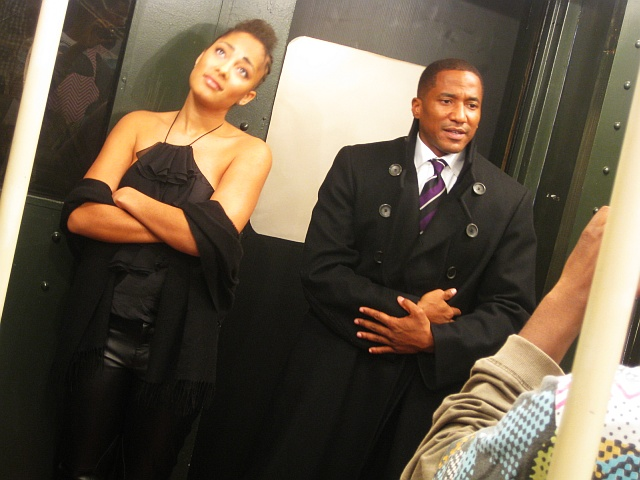
Seales and Q-Tip at the "Manwomanboogie" video shoot in 2008

In 2007, Seales abruptly replaced Natalie Stewart of the musical duo Floetry on tour with Marsha Ambrosius, and in December of that same year Seales (as Amanda Diva) released her first extended play (EP) Life Experience. She later alleged that Ambrosius, who was pregnant at the time, did not support her in the duo. Ambrosius later claimed that Seales fostered a generally hostile and uncooperative work environment that nearly resulted in a physical altercation. In 2008, she was featured on the song "Manwomanboogie" on Q-Tip's Grammy-nominated album The Renaissance. On March 3, 2009, Seales released Spandex, Rhymes & Soul.

Seales hosted a weekly podcast titled Small Doses. Seales's book, Small Doses: Potent Truths for Everyday Use, was released in 2019. The book is an extension of her podcast of the same name. It is a volume of essays, axioms, original illustrations, and photos from her trademark "self-help from the hip” style of commentary.

She created and hosted the touring variety game show Smart Funny & Black.. On April 18, 2022, Seales began co-hosting a new weekly radio show, Amanda Seales’ Smart Funny & Black Radio on SiriusXM, alongside Taj Rani and JeremiahLikeTheBible, featuring topics such as games, celebrity interviews and African-American culture.

=== Advocacy and public positions ===
Seales has frequently spoken on social issues. In 2020, Seales defended actor Jussie Smollett on The Real after his arrest, calling the alleged hoax "low-key noble" as a means to raise awareness; Smollett was later convicted of filing false police reports.

The next year, Seales received criticism from members of Alpha Kappa Alpha regarding her Insecure character wearing the sorority’s insignia; Seales responded that she was playing a character and not personally representing the organization.

== Personal life ==
During a 2024 interview on Club Shay Shay, Seales alleged she paid probation fees for her former romantic partner Boldy James. James previously alluded to their relationship on his 2021 song "Guilty". Seales also alluded to past romantic encounters with Pusha T and Lupe Fiasco. In the same 2024 interview, Seales said she was diagnosed with autism spectrum disorder. She later clarified that she is self-diagnosed and has not been diagnosed by a licensed medical professional. She argued that as a Black woman, it is harder for her to be diagnosed with autism.

In February 2026 at the 2026 BAFTA awards, Tourette Syndrome activist John Davidson yelled out the N-word while Michael B. Jordan and Delroy Lindo were presenting an award. Seales condemned Black actors present for not leaving the ceremony, saying it was an incident of racism and stating "that's not even how Tourettes outbursts even work".

In August 2026 Seales stated in an interview that she was estranged from her mother.

=== Allegations of sexual harassment and assault ===
In a 2019 interview with The Breakfast Club and later on her own podcast, Seales accused an unnamed former NFL player of sexually harassing her on the internet and over phone calls. Allegedly, eight other women approached her and corroborated the story, leading her to reveal via Instagram that the man she had referenced was Myron Rolle. Rolle denied the accusations and alleged character assassination. Seales responded, saying that she had never accused him of sexually harassing her personally, and that she was speaking out for other women.

During Sexual Assault Awareness Month in 2026, Seales revealed on her podcast that she was sexually assaulted in January 2023 by an unknown man who snuck into her hotel room and put his hands between her legs while her then boyfriend was also present in bed with her. She said that she provided information to local law enforcement, who dismissed the case for lack of detail.

=== Political activities ===
In 2019, Seales erroneously accused Rodney Reed, a death row inmate, of raping and murdering two women (he was only convicted for one murder). Activist Shaun King pointed out her inaccuracy, and maintained that Reed was innocent for the murder for which he had been accused.

Seales opposed Kamala Harris during the 2024 US presidential election, saying she was "running her campaign like a white man" and chastised Harris for not taking her advice on campaign messaging. In July 2024, Seales claimed that the attempted assassination of Donald Trump was "staged". In June 2025, Seales criticized Barack Obama for his lack of support for reparations or police reform as president, attracting widespread criticism from his supporters.

During the Gaza genocide, Seales has expressed support for Palestine through art as activism, noting that she has lost industry relationships over her stance. These have included her agents and friends. In an interview with AJ+, Seales used the phrase "from the river to the sea". In September 2025, she signed an open pledge with Film Workers for Palestine pledging not to work with Israeli film institutions "that are implicated in genocide and apartheid against the Palestinian people."

After the assassination of Charlie Kirk in 2025, Seales said she did not feel empathy for his death because "he don't believe in no empathy".

In a July 2026 interview with Briahna Joy Gray, Seales called John Fetterman a "Nazi", stated her opposition to Graham Platner, and said that it is "counterintuitive" and "counterrevolutionary" for a leftist candidate to be elected in any branch of the United States government. She also criticized AOC for appearing in photos during the release of Mahmoud Khalil, calling her an "opportunistic corny politician liar".

== Discography ==
=== EPs ===
List of extended plays, with selected details and year released
| Title | Album details |
|---|---|
| Life Experience | Released: December 18, 2007; Label: Self-released; Format: Digital download |
| Spandex, Rhymes & Soul | Released: March 3, 2009; Label: Self-released; Format: Digital download |
| Madame Monochrome | Released: April 27, 2011; Label: Self-released; Format: Digital download |

=== Mixtapes ===
List of mixtapes, with selected details and year released
| Title | Album details |
|---|---|
| Foreplay | Released: June 6, 2008; Label: Self-released; Format: Digital download |
| Technicolor Lover | Released: May 29, 2012; Label: Self-released; Format: Digital download |

=== Guest appearances ===
List of non-single guest appearances, with other performing artists, showing year released and album name
| Title | Year | Album | Artist(s) |
|---|---|---|---|
| "Manwomanboogie" | 2008 | The Renaissance | Q-Tip |
| "Get Right" | 2010 | Rebel Without Applause | Johnny Polygon |
| "Blvd Broad" | 2010 | Rebel Without Applause | Johnny Polygon |
| "You Belong to Me" | 2010 | Catch-Up | Johnny Polygon |
| "Beautiful Things" | 2010 | LIFE | Kenichiro Nishihara |
| "Proud 2 Be" | 2012 | Crack on Steroids | N.O.R.E., M-1 |

=== Music videos ===
List of music videos, showing year released and director
| Title | Year | Director(s) |
|---|---|---|
| "Neon" (featuring Johnny Polygon) | 2009 | Lyn-don McCray |

== Filmography ==
=== Film ===
| Year | Title | Role | Notes |
|---|---|---|---|
| 1993 | Cop and a Half | Katy | |
| 2006 | Freedomland | Angry Female Tenant | |
| 2011 | Identical | Poet #2 | |
| 2016 | Ladies Book Club | Helena | TV movie |
| 2018 | The Story of Our Times | Shancy | TV movie |

=== Television ===
| Year | Title | Role | Notes |
|---|---|---|---|
| 1994–95 | My Brother and Me | Deonne Wilburn | Recurring cast |
| 2002–05 | Def Poetry Jam | Herself | Episode: "Episode #2.5" & "#5.8" |
| 2010 | Undateable | Herself | Main guest |
| 2011 | Independent Lens | Herself | Episode: "Deaf Jam" |
| 2012 | MTV's Hip Hop POV | Herself/Co-Host | Main co-host |
| 2012 | Made | Herself/Made Coach | Episode: "Professional Actress: Rita" |
| 2013 | Big Evening Buzz | Herself/Panelist | Episode: "Dido" |
| 2013 | Master of the Mix | Herself/Host | Main host: Season 3 |
| 2013 | Big Morning Buzz Live | Herself/Panelist | Recurring panelist |
| 2015 | The View | Herself/Guest Co-Host | Episode: "Episode #18.85" |
| 2015–17 | Get Your Life | Herself | Main cast |
| 2016 | Comedy Knockout | Herself | Episode: "That Ass, Tho" |
| 2016–17 | Greatest Ever | Herself/Host | Main host |
| 2016–21 | Insecure | Tiffany DuBois | Recurring cast |
| 2017 | Hood Adjacent with James Davis | Herself | Episode: "Black Twitter" |
| 2017 | @midnight | Herself | Episode: "Episode #4.42" & "#4.136" |
| 2017 | Gay of Thrones | Herself | Episode: "The Sores of Whores" |
| 2017–20 | The Real | Herself/Co-Host | Guest co-host: Season 4, Main Co-Host: Season 6 |
| 2018 | Black-ish | Barbara | Recurring cast: Season 4 |
| 2018 | Animals. | Tia/Waitress 1 (voice) | Episode: "Rats" |
| 2018–19 | Hip Hop Squares | Herself/Panelist | Recurring panelist: Season 5-6 |
| 2019 | Bring the Funny | Herself/Host | Main host |
| 2019 | Camp Confessions | Herself | Episode: "Amanda Seales Makes Love to Spirit" |
| 2019–21 | To Tell the Truth | Herself/Panelist | Guest panelist: Season 4-5 & 7 |
| 2020 | Cooked with Cannabis | Herself | Episode: "High Holidays" |
| 2020 | Floored | Herself/Guest Judge | Episode: "Beware the Bears" |
| 2020 | BET Awards | Herself/Host | Main host |
| 2020 | Hollywood Game Night | Herself/Celebrity Player | Episode: "Twitch & Shout" |
| 2020 | Match Game | Herself/Contestant | Episode: "Episode #5.8" |
| 2021 | Fast Foodies | Herself | Episode: "Amanda Seales" |
| 2021 | Finding Magic Mike | Herself | Episode: "A Talented Man" |
| 2022 | Real Husbands of Hollywood | Herself | Episode: "Wrestling While Black" |
| 2022 | Everything's Gonna Be All White | Herself | Main guest |
| 2022 | Inventions That Changed History | Herself | Recurring guest |
| 2022 | Celebrity Game Face | Herself/Contestant | Episode: "Cedric the Entertainer Busts Kevin's Chops" |
| 2022 | Wheel of Fortune | Herself/Contestant | Episode: "Amanda Seales, Snoop Dogg, Mark Duplass" |
| 2022 | Mickey Mouse Funhouse | Annie the Giant (voice) | Recurring cast: Season 1 |
| 2022 | Sherman's Showcase | Faith Evans | Episode: "Fashion!" |
| 2022–23 | 25 Words or Less | Herself/Contestant | Recurring contestant: Season 3-5 |
| 2022–24 | Pictionary | Herself/Team Captain | Recurring Team Captain: Season 1, Guest Team Captain: Season 2 |
| 2023 | See It Loud: The History of Black Television | Herself | Recurring guest |
| 2023 | The $100,000 Pyramid | Herself/Celebrity Player | Episode: "Will Sasso vs. Amanda Seales and Dulé Hill vs. Francia Raisa" |
| 2023 | Name That Tune | Herself/Contestant | Episode: "Lightning & Glitter!" |
| 2023 | Celebrity Squares | Herself/Contestant | Recurring guest |
| 2023 | Celebrity Jeopardy! | Herself/Contestant | Episode: "Quarter Final #9: Kyra Sedgwick, Mo Rocca and Amanda Seales" |
| 2023 | Crimson Hearts Collide | Kelsey | Main cast |

=== Documentary ===
| Year | Title |
|---|---|
| 2007 | Beef 4 |
| 2008 | Big Pun: The Legacy |
| 2014 | Bottoms Up |
