= Greatest Ever =

American comedy series, 2016 to 2017

- Genre: Comedy; Entertainment news
- Presented by: Amanda Seales
- Starring: Kevin McCaffrey; Pete Lee; Shakir Standley; Jade Catta-Preta
- Country of origin: United States
- Original language: English
- No. of seasons: 2
- No. of episodes: 28

Production
- Editors: Aurora De Lucia; Rob Vernola
- Running time: 30 minutes

Original release
- Network: TruTV
- Release: April 5, 2016 – May 26, 2017

Greatest Ever is an American comedy series created and executive produced for TruTV by Mat Baxt. The series had two seasons, and aired from April 5, 2016 to May 26, 2017.

== Format ==
Greatest Ever was a half hour variety show which featured comedians commenting on internet videos, with each week having a different theme (e.g. "Greatest Weddings Ever," Greatest Conspiracy Theories Ever"). It followed a similar format to another Meetinghouse Productions television show, TruTV Presents: World's Dumbest... It aired on Friday nights, and features host Amanda Seales and comedians Kevin McCaffrey, Pete Lee, Shakir Standley, and Jade Catta-Preta.

== Transmissions ==
Season	Episodes	Originally released	
Season	Episodes	First released	Last released
1	16	July 5, 2016	March 10, 2017
2	9	March 10, 2017	May 26, 2017

== Episodes ==
=== Season 1 (2016–17) ===
Season one of Greatest Ever premiered on July 5, 2016 on the TruTV network.

No. overall	No. in season	Title	Original release date
1	1	"Greatest Products Ever"	July 5, 2016
2	2	"Greatest Politicians Ever"	July 12, 2016
3	3	"Greatest Sports Ever"	July 19, 2016
4	4	"Greatest Weddings Ever"	July 26, 2016
5	5	"Greatest Animals Ever"	August 2, 2016
6	6	"Greatest Newscasts Ever"	August 9, 2016
7	7	"Greatest Kids Ever"	December 26, 2016
8	8	"Greatest Parties Ever"	January 2, 2017
9	9	"Greatest Vacations Ever"	January 9, 2017
10	10	"Greatest Performers Ever"	January 27, 2017
11	11	"Greatest Food Ever"	February 3, 2017
12	12	"Greatest Internet Stars Ever"	February 10, 2017
13	13	"Greatest Relationships Ever"	February 17, 2017
14	14	"Greatest Life Ever"	February 24, 2017
15	15	"Greatest Pets Ever"	March 3, 2017
16	16	"Wreatest College Ever"	March 10, 2017

=== Season 2 (2017) ===
No. overall	No. in season	Title	Original release date
17	1	"Greatest Parents Ever"	March 10, 2017
18	2	"Greatest Body Ever"	March 24, 2017
19	3	"Greatest Travelers Ever"	March 24, 2017
20	4	"Greatest Pranks Ever"	March 31, 2017
21	5	"Greatest Conspiracy Theories Ever"	April 7, 2017
22	6	"Greatest Surprises Ever"	April 14, 2017
23	7	"Greatest Fans Ever"	April 21, 2017
24	8	"Greatest Holidays Ever"	April 28, 2017
25	9	"Greatest Style Ever"	May 5, 2017
26	9	"Greatest Night Ever"	May 12, 2017
27	9	"Greatest Viral Videos Ever"	May 19, 2017
28	9	"Greatest Summer Ever"	May 26, 2017
