= Johnny Polygon =

American hip hop recording artist

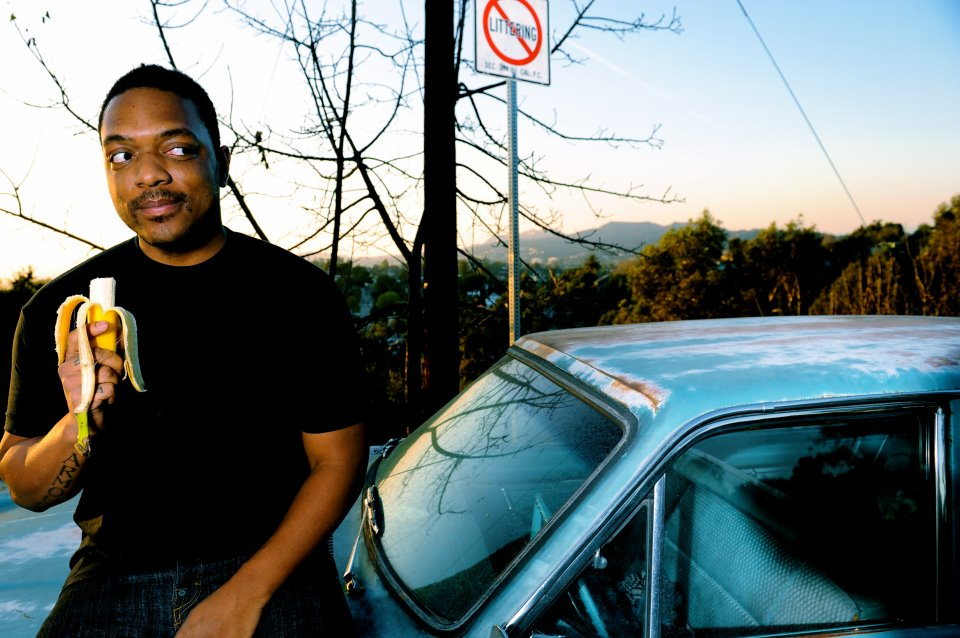
- Polygon in Silverlake, California

Background information
- Born: John Willima Armour; May 15, 1984 (age 42); Cleveland, Ohio, United States
- Origin: Tulsa, Oklahoma, United States
- Genres: Hip hop; alternative R&B
- Occupations: Rapper; singer; songwriter; record producer; actor
- Instrument: Vocals
- Years active: 2001–present
- Labels: Bananabeat Records; Invasion Music Group

John Willima Armour (born May 15, 1984), better known by his stage name Johnny Polygon, is an American rapper, singer, songwriter and music producer. Raised in Tulsa, Oklahoma, Polygon would meet American producer DJ Green Lantern in 2008, who offered him a record deal with his label imprint, Invasion Music Group. In 2009, Polygon released his first project under the label, an extended play (EP) titled Group Hug, which URB Magazine called "risky yet authentic." In 2010, Polygon followed his EP with Rebel Without Applause, his first official mixtape, which included the promotional single, "The Riot Song". The single went on to be featured on MTV, VH1 and Centric, as well as the HBO television series, How to Make it in America.

Johnny Polygon has worked with high-profile musicians such as Nas and Kid Cudi. He frequently collaborates with his longtime friend and fellow Oklahoman Gabriel Royal, and has also worked with Amanda Diva, Dead Prez and Yelawolf. In 2012, MSN.com named Polygon one of their "Top 5 Up-And-Comers You Should Know." Since 2001, Polygon has released ten studio albums, with his latest being Teddy Bear Massacre 2 (2022).

== Biography ==
=== 1984–2008: Early life and career beginnings ===
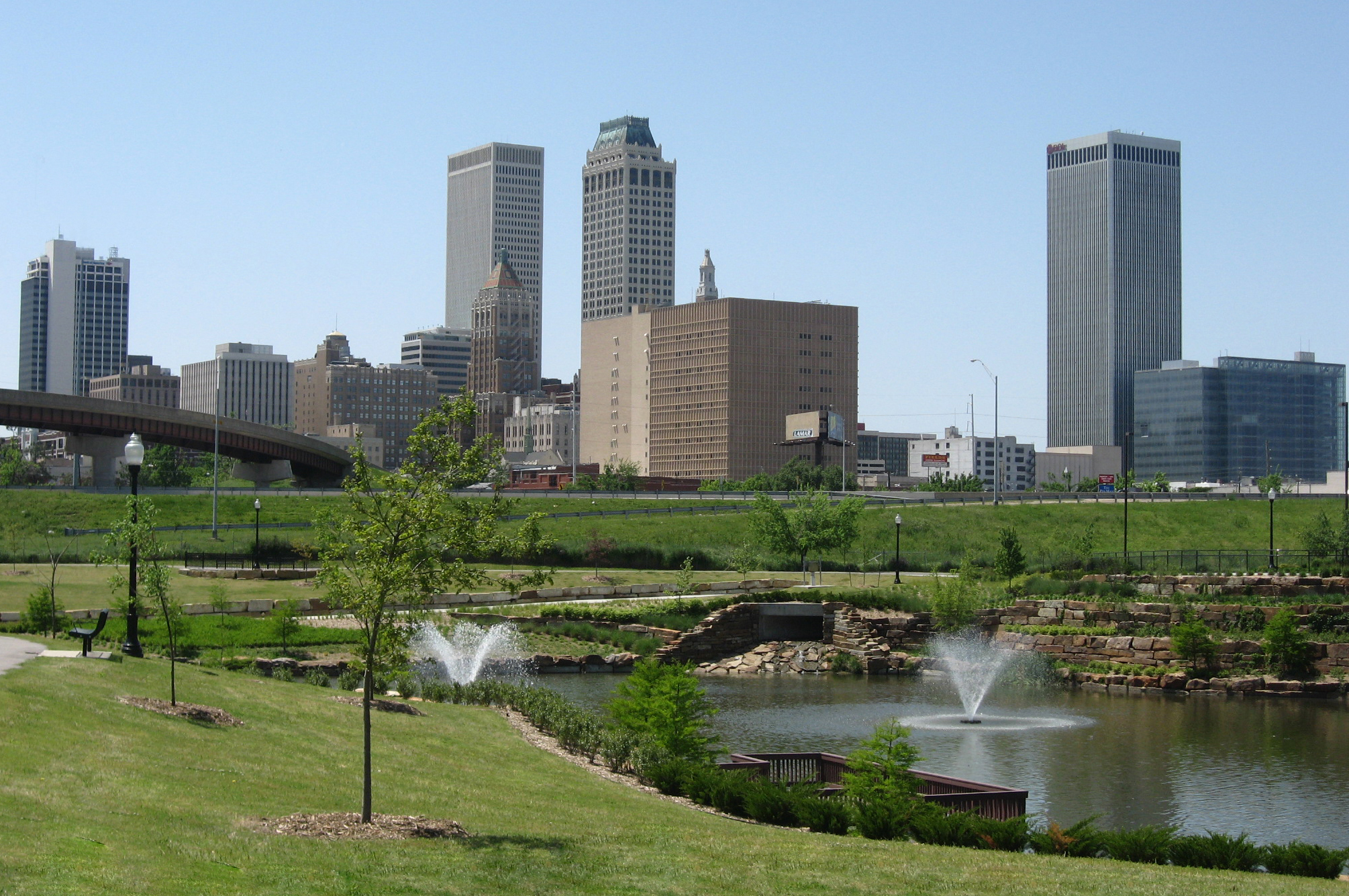
Tulsa, Oklahoma where Polygon grew up and proudly calls his hometown.

Johnny Polygon was born John Armour on May 15, 1984, in Cleveland, Ohio. His family soon relocated to Tulsa, Oklahoma, where Polygon was raised and proudly claims as his hometown. As an adolescent, Johnny Polygon first encountered hip hop through breakdancing. He later began rapping at the age of 14. Polygon continued participating in local theater groups and rap battles, helping him develop a sense of stage presence and projection.

As a teenager, Polygon attended Booker T. Washington High School, Central High School and Project 12 High School, all of which he was kicked out of. He later dropped out of high school to further his career as a rapper.

"I told my parents I want to do music, and they were like you can’t really do that here. So my dad was like ‘I’ll give you a ride—where you want to go, L.A. or New York City?’ And the weather was nicer in L.A., so I was like ‘let’s go there.’"

After working in the underground Midwest scene for several years, Polygon went to Hollywood to advance his music career. He went to Los Angeles with only $297 and a thousand copies of his fourth CD, Leggo My Ego (2004), which he sold on Hollywood Boulevard.

It was in Los Angeles, where Polygon met Nathan Morse, who approached him on making a music video for a song of his titled "Bag". The video was eventually entered into an online contest, which caught the attention of one of the judges, DJ Green Lantern. Liking what he saw and heard, DJ Green Lantern then offered Polygon a chance to record music together in his New York City studio. Polygon, who was homeless at the time, jumped at the opportunity and went to NYC with DJ Green Lantern. In 2008, Polygon signed a recording contract with DJ Green Lantern's record label imprint, Invasion Music Group. Once Polygon signed with DJ Green Lantern, he moved to Brooklyn, where they then recorded several songs, including "Price on Your Head", an original song written for 2008's Grand Theft Auto IV video game. Polygon was also featured on fellow American rapper Nas' 2008 untitled album, singing the chorus for the song "Black President".

=== 2009–2010: Group Hug and Wolf in Cheap Clothing ===
In 2009, Polygon made his national television debut on BET’s Inaugural Address, performing "Black President" with Nas. On May 12, 2009, Polygon released his first project under Invasion Music Group, his debut extended play (EP), titled Group Hug. URB Magazine called Group Hug "risky yet authentic" and gave it four out of five stars. On July 17, 2009, Polygon was featured in Vapor Magazine. In an August 2009 interview, Polygon revealed plans of forming a group with frequent collaborator Amanda Diva, called The Okay Maybes. On September 14, 2009, he was again featured in YRB Magazine. Polygon also made an appearance on the Dead Prez mixtape, Pulse of the People: Turn Off the Radio Vol. 3 (2009). He was featured on the song "NYDP", which was also included in the 2010 film Brooklyn’s Finest. In late 2009, Polygon made a cameo appearance in Kid Cudi’s "Pursuit of Happiness" music video, alongside fellow rappers Drake and Consequence.

On February 14, 2010, Polygon released Rebel Without Applause, a mixtape presented by DJ Green Lantern and Karmaloop.com. The mixtape features guest appearances from Kid Cudi and Amanda Diva, as well as longtime friend and collaborator, Gabe Royal. Following the release of the mixtape was a music video for "The Riot Song", which premiered on February 23. The video is a Wile E. Coyote and Road Runner inspired live action cartoon, using over 3,000 real paper cut outs to tell the story, with no repeating images. "The Riot Song" was featured on an episode of HBO’s 2010 series, How to Make it in America. "The Riot Song" was also included on the soundtrack to How to Make it in America, which was curated by Kid Cudi and Scott Vener, as well as presented by Kid Cudi, DJ Green Lantern and Broke Mogul. During the intro of the track Cudi states that Johnny is "…the illest up-and-coming artist". On March 31, 2010, Polygon visited Los Angeles’ KPWR's POWER 106 FM THE TAKEOVER with the LA Leakers and DJ Reflex. During the show he performed a freestyle over The Black Eyed Peas' hit single, "Imma Be". In the July 2010 issue of Oklahoma Magazine, Johnny Polygon had a featured spread.

Polygon also had his own online show on karmaloop.tv. The premise of the show revolved around Polygon and his life as a recording artist. On its second season, the show had featured stories about him, Nas, and Kid Cudi, as well as what its like to be in the shoes of Johnny Polygon. In 2010, Polygon's song "Ebonics", was included on the soundtrack to the film, The Rock 'n' Roll Dreams of Duncan Christopher. On April 1, 2010, during a show in Los Angeles, Polygon announced he was no longer signed to DJ Green Lantern's label imprint and that he would be moving forward as an independent artist. Polygon's video for "The Riot Song" premiered on MTV2’s show subterranean on July 28, 2010. Also in late July, "The Riot Song" music video was added to VH1 Soul and mtvU. Additionally, "The Riot Song" appeared on BET's Centric and saw heavy play on Radio Nova (France). "The Riot Song" video, eventually broke MTV's Top 100, peaking at number eight.

On November 16, 2010, Johnny Polygon released an official 30-track mixtape presented by Orisue, titled Catch-Up. The project is essentially a compilation album composed of tracks from Polygon's career up to 2010, as well as remixes, unreleased tracks and collaborations with other artists. The tape was released in promotion for his second EP, Wolf in Cheap Clothing (2010). Wolf in Cheap Clothing was released for free download on December 15, 2010, to critical acclaim.

=== 2011–2013: The Nothing ===
In 2011, Polygon returned to his Oklahoma roots where he was featured on the back of This Land Press' January print issue, as part of the paper's "True Tulsa" portrait series. In April 2011, Johnny Polygon starred as the titular character in a short film titled Where is Victor Black?, which was directed by Italian Vogue director Tommaso Cardile. The film, which co-stars Jennifer Missoni, was entered in the 48 Hour Film Project contest. In an interview published in April 2011, Polygon said he had declined a record deal that would have required him to live in California, out of loyalty to his hometown of Tulsa, Oklahoma. In August 2011, Polygon stopped by Los Angeles’ Knocksteady Live and performed "Limosexsuperstar", a new song from his upcoming project, Pussy Gun, for their podcast. Polygon's album Pussy Gun, had been announced for a 2012 release under Bananabeat Records.

On March 7, 2012, Polygon released a trailer for a song titled "My Shit >" and released the song for free download, via his Facebook page. Almost eight months after performing the song for Knocksteady TV, Polygon released the un-mastered audio for Pussy Gun's lead single, "Limosexsuperstar". In May 2012, Polygon's song “Ebonics” was included in the original motion picture soundtrack to the film The Rock 'n' Roll Dreams of Duncan Christopher.

On September 7, 2012, via his Twitter feed, Polygon announced that he is no longer signed or affiliated with Bananabeat Records and would release Pussy Gun independently. The music video for his song "My Shit", was also released on September 7. Polygon made his directorial debut in November 2012, directing the music video for THURZ's "Are You Not", which also features vocals from Polygon himself.

In December 2012, MSN.com named Polygon one of the "Top 5 Artists Up-And-Comers You Should Know." On December 12, 2012, Polygon revealed he would be releasing a project preceding the release of Pussy Gun. He stated the project would feature 7–12 brand new songs and would be released in early 2013, while announcing Pussy Gun for late 2013.

On February 27, 2013, Polygon released The Nothing. The 12-track album was the product of collaborations with record producers Picnic Tyme, Daygee Kwia, ACDMY and Mateo. The album was co-produced, mixed and mastered by Manhattan-based record producer Alex Gruenberg.The Nothing was available for free download and later on March 4, 2013, for digital purchase. Melissa Pandika of OZY Media wrote The Nothing is "a kaleidoscope of psychedelic soundscapes laden with darkly personal rhymes, a laid-back flow — and an unexpectedly soulful, haunting falsetto."

In March 2013, Polygon embarked on a U.S. national tour entitled Light Up The Night, which began in Tulsa at The Vanguard on March 20, with American hip hop group Pac Div. Polygon later announced he would be releasing an EP next. In January 2014, Polygon tweeted: "The new EP is shaping up beastly" and revealed he would premiere some new songs at his then-upcoming show in New York. A few days later he tweeted: "My next ep will be my last". On February 1, 2014, Polygon released a remix to the song "Versace", which he re-titled "Old Navy".

=== 2014–2016: Water Damage and I Love You, Goodnight. ===
On March 23, 2014, Polygon unveiled a tentative track list for the new EP, when he posted a screenshot of it on Instagram, with the caption: "It's happening again. 5 more and it's all yours.". Throughout May 2014, Polygon performed in New York City, to promote his upcoming project. On June 19, 2014, Polygon tweeted: "Droppin a new project next month. Touring it in august". On June 20, 2014, Polygon released a song titled "Never Too Old to Die Young", via independent online music store Bandcamp. On July 25, 2014, Polygon released "The Weather Report", another single via Bandcamp. On August 30, 2014, after releasing a single titled "The Fall", Polygon revealed his next project would be titled King of Ashes. On October 1, 2014, Polygon performed and premiered his song "Dead Meat", live in Cosmic Zoo studio, after a long conversation with Intuition, on the Kinda Neat podcast. On November 8, 2014, Polygon revealed he changed the title of his upcoming project and that it would no longer be an EP, but instead a full-length album. On December 21, 2014, Polygon announced he would release the album, now titled I Love You, Goodnight., after his website reaches 200 members.

On February 25, 2015, Polygon unexpectedly released an album titled Water Damage, selling only a limited 200 copies, via his website. On his website Polygon wrote: "This collection of songs is entitled Water Damage. Don’t worry guys, i love you, goodnight is still on its way. It’s being mastered, mixed and then off to the vinyl manufacturer for duplication so an update on the release date is just weeks away. To tide your appetite, I’ve got a collection of leaks from over the years as well as unreleased material you guys have been asking for, for years upon years. I’m finally letting those tracks go." After Water Damage was released, it was revealed that the project was actually the long-awaited and unreleased album, Pussy Gun. Polygon later revealed I Love You, Goodnight., would be released May 15, 2015. The album will be supported by North American and European tour dates and four music video releases. In 2015, Polygon lent his voice as the starring and supporting characters in 50 episodes of a National Geographic sponsored children's show entitled, 50 Birds, 50 States.

In support of the Water Damage album, Polygon organized the "Hole in the Wall" concert tour. In March 2015, Polygon made his debut appearance at the Norman Music Festival. On May 15, 2015, Polygon announced that he had pushed back I Love You, Goodnight., because his frequent collaborator Picnic Tyme, the producer behind "The Riot Song" and "Kids Broken Hearted", had given him new material to work with for the album. He also revealed the new release date to be June 4, 2015. In May 2015, Polygon was featured in an article on The Oklahoman and NewsOK.com.

On February 10, 2016, Polygon revealed he had a few hard copies of a secret album that he would only be releasing to people in Los Angeles hand-to-hand. On August 30, 2016, Polygon announced he would be recording his first live album. In September, Polygon revealed he would be recording the album on the twenty-second of that month at live music venue The Yeti, in Tulsa, Oklahoma.

=== 2017–present: Teddy Bear Massacre series ===
On April 20, 2017, in celebration of cannabis culture, Polygon released a new single titled "Sex and Drugs". On April 14, Polygon announced a new project, tentatively titled Nimrod Cupid. Polygon released the album Teddy Bear Massacre, Vol. 1 on May 15, 2019.

== Artistry ==
=== Influences ===
Growing up, Johnny Polygon listened to Nirvana, Elton John, Tupac and Norah Jones.

=== Musical style ===
Johnny Polygon has been described as "a musical artist who combines classic melodies with unconventional song structure for an alternative blend of hip hop, soul and R&B. His lyrical content skews dark and cynical with love stories laced with wit." In 2010, a writer from Planet Ill wrote "Johnny Polygon’s music has a pretty solid mix of pretty spaced out hip hop, electro and rock music production values paired with a nicely adaptable flow as an MC. As far as his singing goes, he does a pretty straight job sans autotune…kinda Pharrell-ish but lower on the octave scale." Last.fm describes Polygon as "an eclectic mix of indie skewed hip hop and world music. He walks to his own beat and stays left of what most perceive from the genre naturally." In March 2014, Melissa Pandika of OZY Media wrote Polygon is "Not quite R&B, not quite hip-hop, his style is hard to categorize, often labeled 'quirky' and 'out there' by critics." Pandika continued to write Polygon's album, The Nothing, is "a kaleidoscope of psychedelic soundscapes laden with darkly personal rhymes, a laid-back flow – and an unexpectedly soulful, haunting falsetto."

== Discography ==
Johnny Polygon discography
- Studio albums: 10
- Extended plays: 3
- Live albums: 1
- Singles: 14
- Music videos: 12
- Mixtapes: 2

The discography of Johnny Polygon consists of 10 studio albums, one live album, three extended plays (EPs), two mixtapes and 14 singles (including two as a featured artist).

=== Studio albums ===
List of studio albums, with selected details and year released
Title	Album details
Soldier and the Dancer	Released: 2002; Label: Self-released; Format: CD
Plan B	Released: 2003; Label: Self-released; Format: CD
Leggo My Ego	Released: 2004; Label: Armatura Production Haus; Format: CD
Meaty-Ogre	Released: 2006; Label: Self-released; Format: CD
The Nothing	Released: February 27, 2013; Label: Self-released; Format: CD, LP, digital download
Water Damage	Released: February 25, 2015; Label: Self-released; Format: CD
I Love You, Goodnight.	Released: October 2, 2015; Label: Self-released; Format: CD, digital Download
The Nothing	Released: November 30, 2019; Label: Self-released; Format: Digital download
Teddy Bear Massacre, Vol. 1	Released: October 14, 2020; Label: Self-released; Format: Digital download
Teddy Bear Massacre 2	Released: October 30, 2022; Label: WaavHaus; Format: Digital download

=== Live albums ===
List of studio albums, with selected details and year released
Title	Album details
Jam in the Van	Released: August 10, 2017; Label: Self-released; Format: Digital download

=== EPs ===
List of extended plays, with selected details and year released
Title	Album details
Journey to I	Released: 2001; Label: Self-released; Format: CD
Group Hug	Released: May 12, 2009; Label: Invasion Music Group; Format: CD, digital download
Wolf in Cheap Clothing	Released: December 15, 2010; Label: Self-released; Format: Digital download

=== Mixtapes ===
List of mixtapes, with selected details and year released
Title	Album details
Rebel Without Applause	Released: February 14, 2010; Label: Invasion Music Group; Format: Digital download
Catch-Up	Released: November 17, 2010; Label: Self-released; Format: Digital Download

=== Singles ===
==== As lead artist ====
List of singles, showing year released and album name
Title	Year	Album
"Bag"	2006	Meaty-Ogre
"The Riot Song"	2010	Rebel Without Applause
"My Shit"	2012	non-album single
"Limosexsuperstar"	2012	Water Damage
"Vacation Suicide"	2013	non-album singles
"You're Never Too Old to Die Young"	2014	non-album singles
"The Weather Report"	2014	non-album singles
"Tokyo Bang"	2015	non-album singles
"The Fall"	2015	I Love You, Goodnight.
"Dead Meat"	2015	I Love You, Goodnight.
"Almost"	2017	non-album singles
"Sex and Drugs"	2017	non-album singles
"White Girl Wasted"	2019	Teddy Bear Massacre, Vol. 1
"27 Club"	2021	non-album singles
"Orgy"	2022	non-album singles

==== As featured artist ====
List of singles, showing year released and album name
Title	Year	Album
"Nothing" (Herbaleggo featuring Johnny Polygon)	2016	non-album single
"Meds" (Dana I.D. Matthews featuring Johnny Polygon)	2017	non-album single

=== Guest appearances ===
List of non-single guest appearances, with other performing artists, showing year released and album name
Title	Year	Album	Artist(s)
"Melt My Heart to Stone (Remix)"	2008	—N/a	Adele
"Price on Your Head"	2008	Grand Theft Auto IV: Liberty City Invasion	—N/a
"Black President"	2008	Untitled Nas album	Nas
"Neon"	2009	Spandex, Rhymes & Soul	Amanda Diva
"Colorblind"	2009	Spandex, Rhymes & Soul	Amanda Diva
"Big Bad Wolf"	2009	Must Be Nice	Jabee
"NYDP"	2009	Pulse of the People: Turn Off the Radio Vol. 3	Dead Prez
"Danger"	2011	The Where Is CH Process	Charles Hamilton
"Battle of the Century, Part I"	2011	The Extended Play EP	T.J. Miller
"Lemonade"	2012	—N/a	Cisco Adler, Dirt Nasty, Yelawolf
"Are You Not"	2012	517 W Queen Tape	THURZ
"Training Wheels"	2014	Eat	Tone
"P.M.L."	2014	Cultural Concoction	A.R.K. Noah
"Hold Mannequin"	2014	King of the Void	Slowriter
"Chemical Romance"	2015	This Is Tully	J Tully
"Minivan (Remix)"	2015	Just a Taste	ADDverse Effects

== Videography ==
=== As lead artist ===
List of music videos, showing year released and director
Title	Year	Director(s)
"Bag"	2004	Nathan Morse
"That's You"	2010	Court Dunn
"The Riot Song"	2010	Shellie Lewis, The Graphic Foundation, Philip Sportel
"What Sadness"	2011	Johnny Polygon
"Invincible"	2011	Tommaso Cardile
"My Shit"	2012	Tommaso Cardile
"Limosexsuperstar"	2013	Austyn Jeffs
"Purple Mess"	2013	Johnny Polygon & Jeremy Charles
"The Worst Christmas Song Ever"	2014	Shellie Lewis
"The Fall"	2015	Shellie Lewis

=== As featured artist ===
List of music videos, showing year released and director
Title	Year	Director(s)
"Neon" (Amanda Diva featuring Johnny Polygon)	2009	Lyn-don McCray
"Are You Not" (THURZ featuring Johnny Polygon)	2012	Johnny Polygon

== Filmography ==
Film
Year	Title	Role	Notes
2011	Where is Victor Black?	Victor Black	Short film, directed by Tommaso Cardile
Television
Year	Title	Role	Notes
2015	50 Birds, 50 States	Various birds (voice)	National Geographic special, 50 episodes
2025	The Lowdown	Reverend Tyrell	2 episodes

== See also ==
- Steph Simon
