= BOK Financial Corporation =

American bank

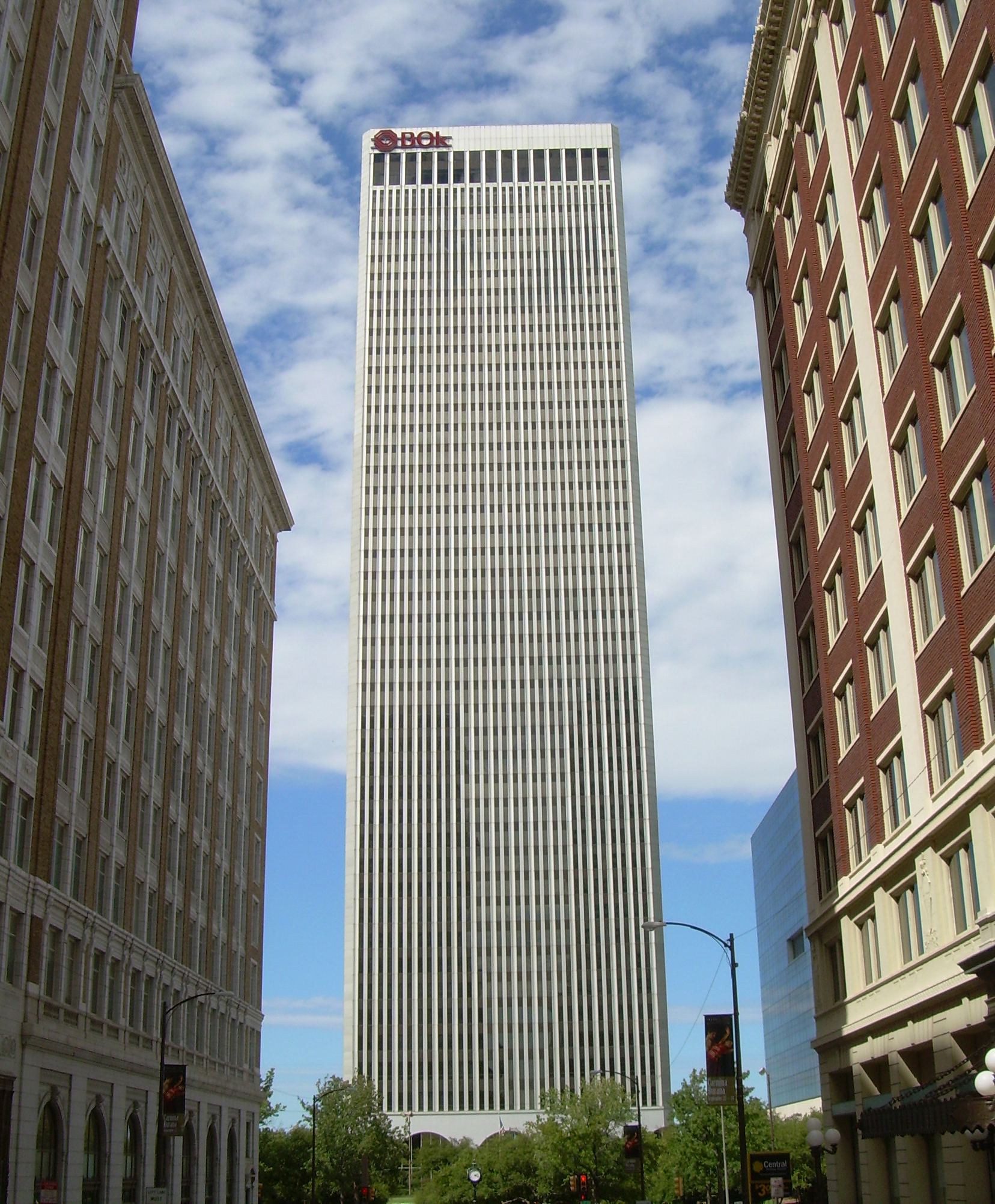
- BOK Tower
- Type: Public
- Traded as: Nasdaq: BOKF; Russell 1000 Index component
- Industry: Banking
- Founded: 1910; 116 years ago, as Exchange National Bank of Tulsa; 1990; 36 years ago, rebranded as BOK Financial Corporation
- Headquarters: BOK Tower, Tulsa, Oklahoma, United States
- Areas served: Nationwide service area with bank operations in Arizona, Arkansas, Colorado, Kansas, Missouri, New Mexico, Oklahoma, Texas
- Key people: George Kaiser (chairman); Stacy Kymes (CEO & president); Marty Grunst (CFO)
- Revenue: ▲US$2.02 billion (fiscal year ended 31 December 2023)
- Net income: ▲US$530.7 million (fiscal year ended 31 December 2023)
- AUM: ▲US$104.7 billion (fiscal year ended 31 December 2023)
- Total assets: ▲$49.8 billion (fiscal year ended 31 December 2023)
- Total equity: ▲$5.1 billion (fiscal year ended 31 December 2023)
- Owner: George Kaiser (53%)
- Number of employees: 4,966 (2023-12-31)
- Website: www.bokf.com

BOK Financial Corporation — pronounced as letters, "B-O-K" — is a financial services holding company headquartered in Tulsa, Oklahoma. Offering a full complement of retail and commercial banking products and services across the American Midwest and Southwest, the company is one of the 50 largest financial services firms in the U.S., and the largest in Oklahoma.

The company's banking subsidiary, BOKF, NA, operates under the brands Bank of Oklahoma, Bank of Texas, and Bank of Albuquerque, and it operates as BOK Financial in Arizona, Arkansas, Colorado, Kansas, and Missouri. It also operates ATM and debit card processor TransFund, Cavanal Hill Investment Management, BOK Financial Securities, BOK Financial Advisors, BOK Financial Insurance, and BOK Financial Asset Management.

The company is more than 50% owned by George Kaiser, who acquired the bank in 1991 from the FDIC. Known for its energy roots, as of June 30, 2021, 14% of its loan portfolio was to borrowers in the petroleum industry.

== History ==
BOK Financial was formed in 1910 primarily as a source of capital for the energy industry and broadened its geographic and market reach to become one of the largest and most multifaceted regional financial institutions in the country.

The company traces its roots to the Exchange National Bank of Tulsa, which was formed in 1910. In 1917, Exchange National Bank began construction of a headquarters building in Tulsa at Third Street and Boston Avenue. In 1928, the bank constructed a 28-story tower adjacent to the initial building. The combined structure, since renamed the 320 South Boston Building, remained the tallest building in Tulsa until 1967. The bank has continuously operated a branch in the building since then.

The bank was rebranded as National Bank of Tulsa in 1933 and in 1975 to Bank of Oklahoma to reflect its statewide approach. Also in 1975, the bank installed the first automated teller machine in Oklahoma. The following year, the company began moving employees into the new BOK Tower and in 1979, the bank reached $1 billion in assets.

Five years later, in 1984, the company purchased Fidelity of Oklahoma and reached $3 billion in assets. Shortly after, the Bank was in danger of failing as the Oklahoma energy market went into depression.

In 1986, the Federal Deposit Insurance Corp bailed the Bank of Oklahoma out for a total cost of $130 million in a move hailed as an innovative response. It was only the eighth time in the past 50 years that the FDIC has acted to keep a troubled bank afloat rather than allow it to fail. Bank of Oklahoma and Bank of Oklahoma, Tulsa were merged, and the FDIC received preferred shares convertible into a 99.99 percent ownership stake in the merged institution. On June 7, 1991, with the company's assets totaling just under $2 billion, it was acquired by George Kaiser, who had served on the bank's board of directors, for $60.7 million in a sale facilitated by the FDIC.

Under Kaiser's ownership, the institution became BOK Financial and developed a strategy to locate in growing markets near Oklahoma.

In 2005, the company acquired the naming rights for the BOK Center for $11 million.

On June 25, 2025 BOK Financial was named the official bank partner of Colorado Athletics.

== Footprint and family of brands ==
Beginning in 1994, the company steadily expanded its footprint beyond Oklahoma, with moves into:

- Arkansas in 1994 through the acquisition of a bank holding company with operations in northwest Arkansas.
- Texas through the acquisition of two banks that were merged and renamed Bank of Texas in 1997.
- New Mexico in 1998 with the acquisition of 17 branches from BankAmericaCorp that were renamed Bank of Albuquerque.
- Colorado in 2003 with the formation of Colorado State Bank and the acquisition in October 2018 of Colorado-based CoBiz Financial, previously Colorado Business Bank. The Colorado and Arizona operations were rebranded as "BOK Financial" in 2018.
- Arizona in 2005 with the formation of Bank of Arizona.
- Missouri in 2016 through the acquisition of MBT Bancshares, the parent company of Missouri Bank and Trust of Kansas City.

In October, 2019 the company rebranded its operations in Arkansas, Kansas, and Missouri as BOK Financial.

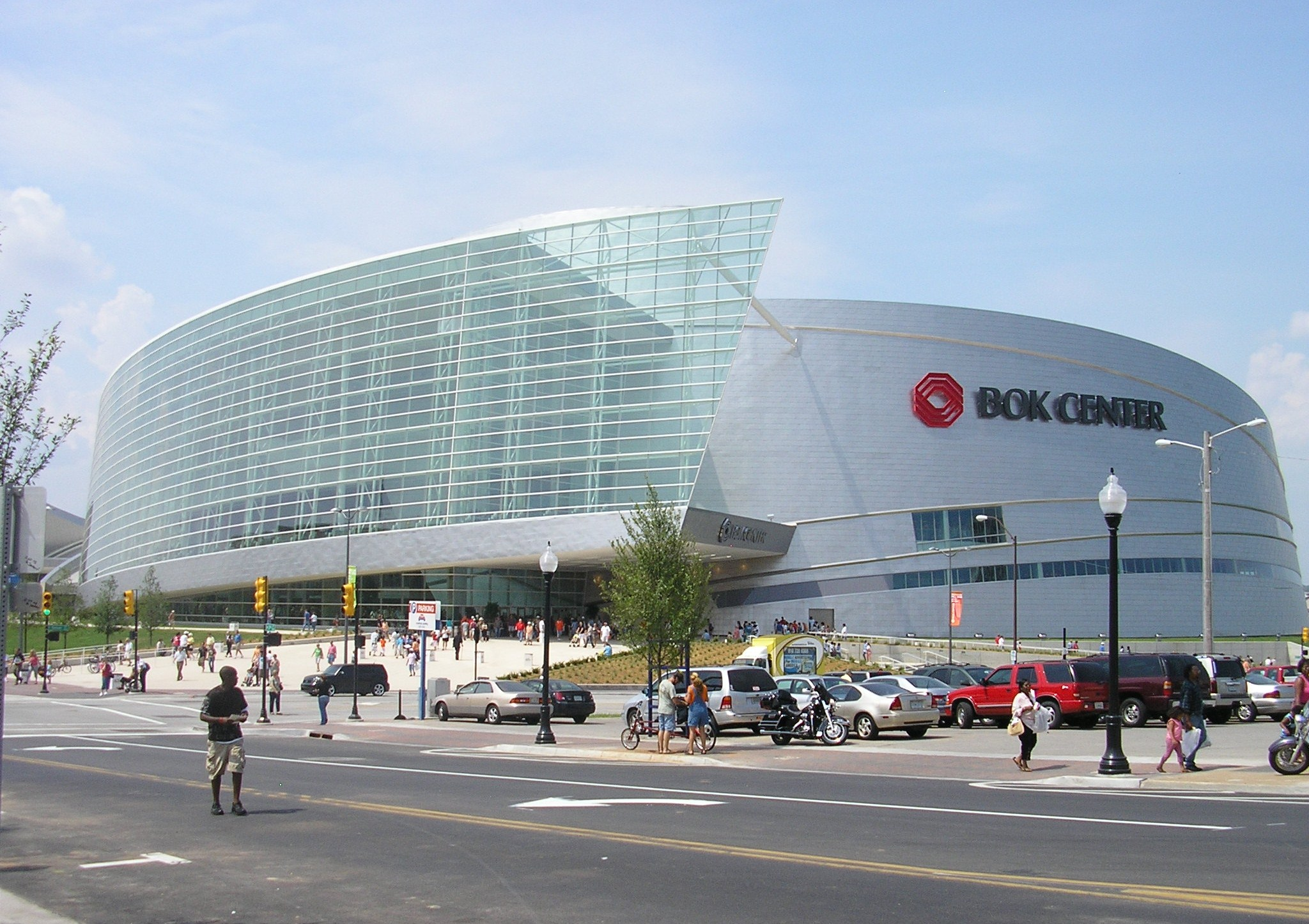
Tulsa's BOK Center, designed by noted architect César Pelli.

== Specialty lines of business ==
In addition to its legacy energy financing expertise, BOK Financial specializes in healthcare-related finance, offering financial and banking services to owners and operators of senior housing and care facilities, hospitals, and health systems, as well as to physicians and specialized practices.

BOK Financial works with tribal nations and governments to facilitate financial solutions for healthcare, education, and tribal infrastructure purposes. With more than 45 tribal relationships across the U.S., the company has helped raise more than $3 billion for tribal projects in recent years. BOK Financial currently manages more than $4 billion in assets for tribal governments and business.
