= Joseph Blatt =

Personal life
- Born: 1878 Ohio
- Died: 1946 (aged 67–68) Oklahoma City, Oklahoma

Religious life
- Religion: Judaism

Jewish leader
- Predecessor: Arthur Lewisohn
- Successor: Joseph Levenson
- Synagogue: Temple B'nai Israel
- Began: 1906
- Ended: 1946

Joseph Blatt was an American rabbi, civic leader, and professor who was the longest serving rabbi of Temple B'nai Israel in Oklahoma City. He was inducted into the Oklahoma Hall of Fame in 1932.

== Early life ==
Joseph Blatt was born in 1878 in Ohio. In 1901, he became a rabbi and worked at a temple in Georgia.

== Oklahoma ==
=== Rabbi ===
Blatt moved to Oklahoma City in 1906. He became the rabbi for the congregation that would build the Temple B'nai Israel there and served in that position until 1946. From 1906 to 1916 he was the only full-time rabbi in the state of Oklahoma. He is remembered for his classical reform approach, interfaith efforts (including guest speaking at many churches in Oklahoma City), but also for his strident defense of the Jewish community in the face of anti-semitic accusations by the Guthrie Daily Leader newspaper (accusations that the state capitol's move from Guthrie to Oklahoma City was inappropriately orchestrated by a group of prominent Jewish businessmen in Oklahoma City). Rabbi Blatt responded that the newspaper's claims were slanderous and that they were a “a disgrace to the civilization of our state.”

Rabbi Blatt was also remembered for his work in helping to organize congregations in Tulsa, Enid, Shawnee and Ardmore, at times even serving as a kind of circuit preacher of sorts, as well as his opposition towards Zionism, as recalled by his successor Rabbi Levinson: (he was) "staunchly opposed to Jewish nationalism and died broken-hearted (in 1946) in the thought that the Reform movement had made peace with political Zionism." He was even described as being a "bitter anti-zionist" by Rabbi Randall Falk of Tulsa.

=== Other work and death ===
Blatt was a part-time professor at the School of Religion at the University of Oklahoma starting in 1915. In 1932, he was inducted into the Oklahoma Hall of Fame. He died in 1946.
