= Congregation B'nai Emunah (Tulsa, Oklahoma) =

Tulsa synagogue

- Location within Oklahoma

Religion
- Affiliation: Judaism
- Leadership: Daniel Kaiman, Principal Rabbi Aaron Miller, Board President

Location
- Location: 1719 S Owasso Ave. Tulsa, OK 74120
- Interactive map of Congregation B'nai Emunah
- Coordinates: 36.1375°N 95.9762°W

Architecture
- Established: 1916

Website
- www.tulsagogue.com

Congregation B'nai Emunah, a progressive synagogue located at 17th and Peoria in Tulsa, Oklahoma, was founded in 1916 as an Orthodox congregation. It originally resided at 919 S Cheyenne Ave.

Currently led by Rabbi Daniel Shalom Kaiman, the synagogue has a rich history of leadership, including notable rabbis like Morris Teller, Harry Epstein, Oscar Fasman, and Norman Shapiro. The congregation outgrew its original facility by the 1930s and built a new synagogue on South Owasso Street, dedicated in 1942. Subsequent expansions and renovations occurred in 1959, 1985, and 1998.

The synagogue houses a NAYEC Accredited Preschool Program, the pro-social Altamont Bakery, the pop-up Seventeenth Street Deli, and a HIAS Affiliated Refugee Resettlement agency.

The congregation has been home to notable individuals such as George Kaiser, Charles Schusterman, Lynn Schusterman, Stacy Schusterman, Tim Blake Nelson, Micah Fitzerman-Blue, Larry Mizel, Henry Kravis, Robert Butkin, Tom Adelson, Janet Levit, and Robert Donaldson.

== Early history and founding ==
Jewish settlers in Tulsa established a minyan by 1903 and grew to 12 families by 1905. They formed Congregation B'nai Emunah in 1915, with Marion Travis as the first president, and built a synagogue on S. Cheyenne Street. Despite its Orthodox origins, the congregation's use of English in its constitution indicated a move towards assimilation. Rabbi Morris Teller, a Conservative rabbi, was hired in 1916.

== Significant developments ==
The congregation grew as Tulsa's Jewish population expanded, reaching 2,850 people by 1937. Leadership saw transitions with rabbis like Harry Epstein, Oscar Fasman, and Norman Shapiro. By 1949, Arthur Kahn's leadership marked significant growth, balancing Orthodox roots with Conservative practices. In 1985, Marc Boone Fitzerman became rabbi, known for his dynamic leadership, interfaith dialogue, and social justice initiatives. His tenure marked the gradual shift from traditionalism to a more inclusive form of Judaism. Musical instrumentation, fully egalitarian worship and liturgy, and experimental religious tradition were embraced by the congregation.

== Modern era ==
Daniel Shalom Kaiman joined in 2013 as Assistant Rabbi, was promoted to Associate Rabbi in 2015, and Rabbi in 2018. He became Principal Rabbi in 2023 after Marc Fitzerman's retirement. The present congregation considers itself "aligned" with Conservative Judaism but is no longer an official affiliate of United Synagogue of Conservative Judaism.
