= Temple B'nai Israel (Oklahoma City) =

Synagogue in Oklahoma City, OK

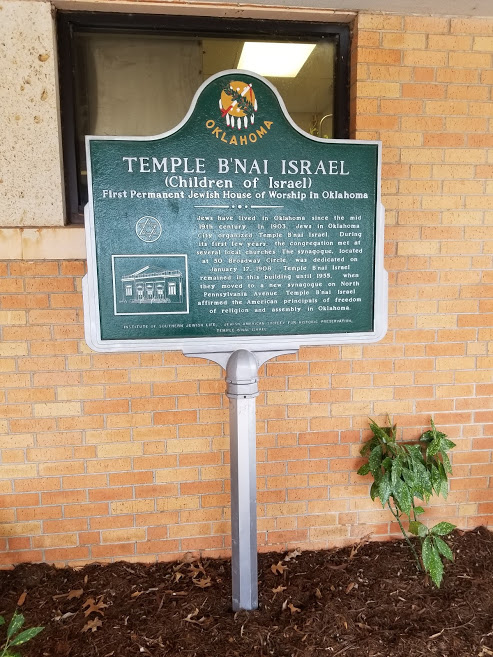
- Historic Marker at the synagogue

- Location in Oklahoma Temple B'nai Israel (Oklahoma City) (the United States)

Religion
- Affiliation: Reform Judaism
- Ecclesiastical or organisational status: Synagogue
- Leadership: Rabbi Vered Harris
- Year consecrated: 1955
- Status: Active

Location
- Location: 4901 North Pennsylvania, Oklahoma City, Oklahoma
- Country: United States
- Coordinates: 35°31′14″N 97°33′02″W

Architecture
- Established: 1903 (as a congregation)
- Completed: 1955

Website
- thetempleokc.shulcloud.com

Temple B'nai Israel is a Reform Jewish congregation and synagogue located at 4901 North Pennsylvania, Oklahoma City, Oklahoma, United States. The congregation is the oldest active Jewish congregation in Oklahoma.

== History ==
=== Early years ===
Jewish people were present in Oklahoma City since its founding in 1889 with the first minyan for High Holy Day services being held in 1890, but no formal synagogue was known to be formed for another 13 years, however, in 1901 the Hebrew Cemetery Association of Oklahoma City was incorporated with land being purchased at the Fairlawn Cemetery.

The congregation was founded in May 1903 (one year before the founding of Emmanuel Synagogue, first affiliated with the Orthodox movement, later starting in 1946 with the Conservative movement)) but it met at St. Luke's Methodist Church and other local churches until it constructed its own building in 1907. This building was located at 50 Broadway Circle and was dedicated on January 17, 1908 (only about 2 months after Oklahoma became a state).

For the congregation's first high holiday services in 1903, the service was led by a student rabbi from the Reform movement's Hebrew Union College in Cincinnati, Harry Friedman, while regular Shabbat services were led by Gus Paul (the city attorney of Oklahoma City). The following year, the congregation hired its first full-time rabbi, Arthur Lewisohn (also a student at HUC), but his tenure was short, and by November he had to leave the position due to his health. He did a few months later in March 1905 at the age of 23. (Note: Please note that some sources omit Rabbi Lewisohn from the list of the congregation's rabbis due to his being a student rabbi, but he was the first professional full-time rabbi of the congregation.) Lewisohn's death did not stop the congregation from holding its first confirmation service for six graduates, said at the time to be the first Jewish confirmation services held in the Oklahoma and Indian territories.

The congregation called its longest-serving rabbi, Joseph Blatt in 1906 who served until 1946. Rabbi Blatt is remembered for his classical reform approach, (Note: By an example, an ad placed in the Sept. 26, 1906 edition of The Oklahoman offered music lessons from a "Wm. A. Gray" who was currently serving as both the choir director of St. Paul's Episcopal Cathedral and as music director at Temple B'nai Israel. - (resource available from the Oklahoman archives at Metrolibrary.org). Rabbi Blatt forbid bar mitzvahs during his rabbinate.) interfaith efforts (including guest speaking at many churches in Oklahoma City), but also for his strident defense of the Jewish community in the face of anti-semitic accusations by the Guthrie Daily Leader newspaper (accusations that the state capitol's move from Guthrie to Oklahoma City was inappropriately orchestrated by a group of prominent Jewish businessmen in Oklahoma City). Rabbi Blatt responded that the newspaper's claims were slanderous and that they were a “a disgrace to the civilization of our state.”

Rabbi Blatt was also remembered for his work in helping to organize congregations in Tulsa, Enid, Shawnee and Ardmore, at times even serving as a kind of circuit preacher of sorts, as well as his opposition towards Zionism, as recalled by his successor Rabbi Levinson: (he was) "staunchly opposed to Jewish nationalism and died broken-hearted (in 1946) in the thought that the Reform movement had made peace with political Zionism." He was even described as being a "bitter anti-zionist" by Rabbi Randall Falk of Tulsa.

=== Mid- and late 20th century ===
Joseph Levenson served as rabbi for 30 years, from 1946 to 1976. Major events during his rabbinate included the congregation's move into its current building (at what was then the edge of Oklahoma City, near NW 50th & Penn) in 1955, as well as a tornado hitting the synagogue in 1970; necessitating significant repairs. It was during the rabbinate of Rabbi Levenson that the congregation moved decided towards a Zionist orientation, in contrast to the classical reform's non-Zionist tradition.

In 1950, Rabbi Levenson was called for duty as a US Air Force reservist, so Rabbi Israel Kaplan served as interim rabbi seventeen months. Rabbi Levenson also produced a radio program called "Voice of Judaism" in the 1950s and was active in the National Conference of Christian and Jews]

David A. Packman served as rabbi of the Temple from 1976 to 2004 His years of service were marked by increased involvement by the congregation in interfaith efforts, most notably Oklahoma City's annual Interfaith Thanksgiving service. Rabbi Packman was also an outspoken advocate for LGBTQ inclusion in society.

Rabbi Packman served as Rabbi Emeritus until his death in 2020.

=== 21st century ===
Rabbi Barry Cohen began his rabbinate in Oklahoma in 2004 and served until 2012. It was also in 2004 that synagogue building was bombed by a member of Aryan Nations but only minor damage was done to the building with no injuries. The assailant was later sentenced to 39 years in prison.

During the COVID-19 pandemic in 2020, the congregation began holding all of its worship services and educational programming via online streaming services, as well as providing resources to enable members in social isolation to have the needed supplies to celebrate Passover and later the High Holy Days at home. The congregation began indoor in-person services with limited capacity starting on March 5, 2021 and eventually full-capacity later that year.

== Current programs ==
Today the congregation holds weekly Shabbat evening services, monthly Shabbat morning services and a variety of special observances for Jewish holidays. It is led by Rabbi Vered Harris.

The congregation also hosts the Erna Krouch Pre-school (the oldest continuously operated in Oklahoma City), a Hebrew school, and a Religious Education program for youth and adults. The congregation also has an active social justice program which focuses on issues related to hunger, poverty, LGBTQ equality and the rights of refugees.

Temple B'nai Israel has also had an active program of educating potential adult converts to Judaism, including not only non-Jewish spouses of Jewish members, but also those who had no previous Jewish background. The congregation in the past, under Rabbi Packman, also performed official conversions of children who were raised as Jews but who did not have Jewish mothers. (Note: This was despite the Reform Movement's acceptance of such children as being Jews by birth, as a way to make it easier for said children if they chose to later make Aliyah or to be involved in another movement of Judaism.)

== Torah scrolls ==
The congregation currently has five Torah scrolls, including the recently restored Bendorf Torah (which had been rescued from a burning synagogue in Jugenheim in Germany and later made its way to the USA)

== Building ==
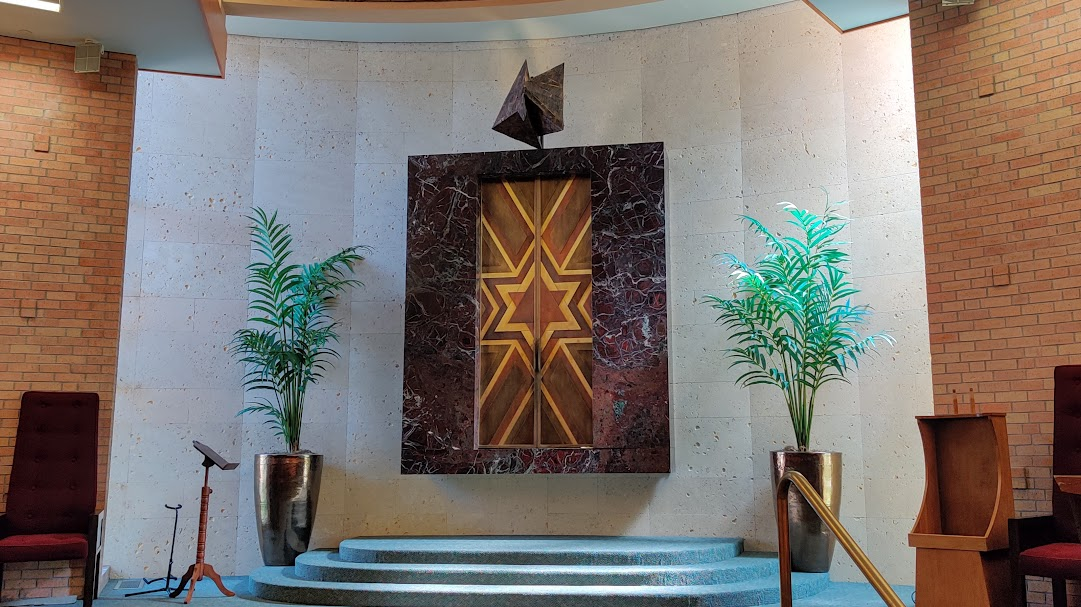
Ark of Temple B'Nai Israel

The current building for Temple B'nai Israel was built in 1955 in a modern style, designed by architect Norman Berlowitz. The building was expanded in 1962 (more Sunday school rooms and Krouch Hall), 2000 (a gymnasium) and 2004 (a chapel addition).

The building includes a main sanctuary, a fellowship hall (which can be also used as overflow seating for high holiday services), classrooms, offices, a library, a gym and a smaller chapel. Art and other visual displays are scattered throughout the building. The building is located on a 8.77-acre campus with a pool and a playground.

== Rabbis ==
The following individuals have served as rabbi of Temple B'nai Israel:

Ordinal	Officeholder	Term start	Term end	Time in office	Notes
1	Arthur Lewisohn	1904	1905	0–1 years	
2	Joseph Blatt	1906	1946	39–40 years	
3	Joseph Levenson	1946	1976	29–30 years	
−	Israel Kaplan	1950	1951	0–1 years	Interim while Levenson was serving as an activated USAF reserve chaplain
4	David A. Packman	1976	2004	27–28 years	
5	Barry Cohen	2004	2012	7–8 years	
6	Vered Harris	2012	incumbent	13–14 years	

== Notable members ==
- Sylvan Goldman (1898–1984) inventor of the shopping cart and the luggage cart
- Leo Meyer (1873–1964), Oklahoma State Auditor from 1911 to 1915, Assistant Secretary of State (1907)
