= Woody Guthrie Center =

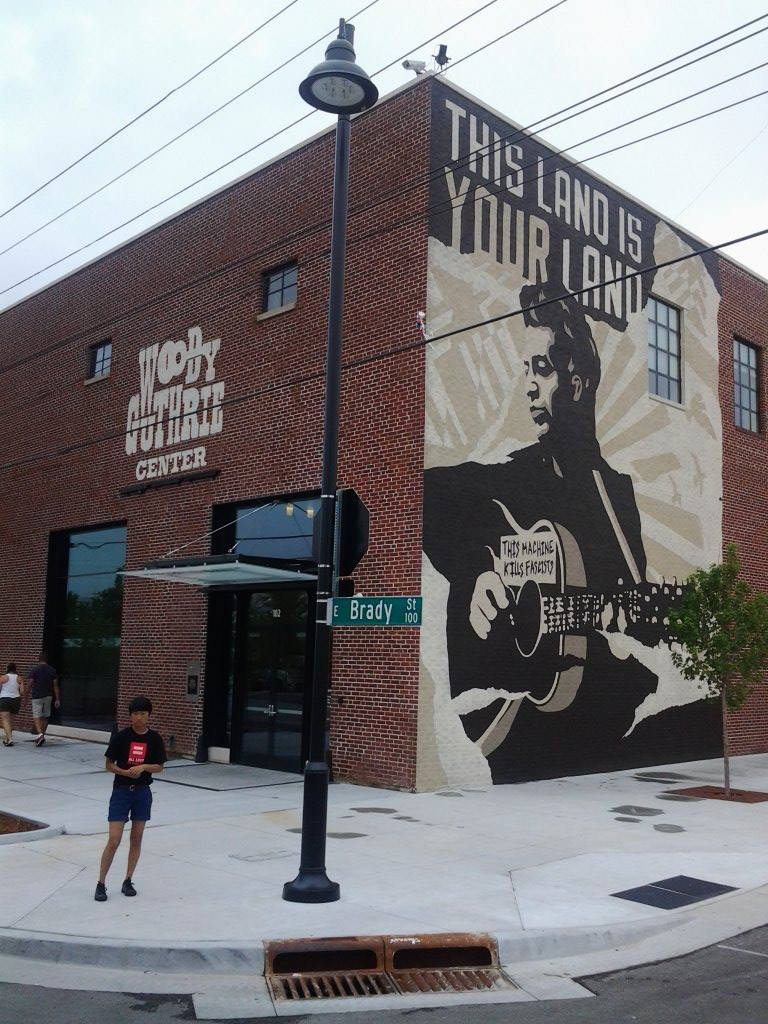
- Exterior of Woody Guthrie Center in the Tulsa Arts District
- Established: Opened April 27, 2013
- Location: Tulsa, Oklahoma
- Type: Biographical museum
- Director: Cady Shaw
- Architect: KKT Architects
- Website: woodyguthriecenter.org

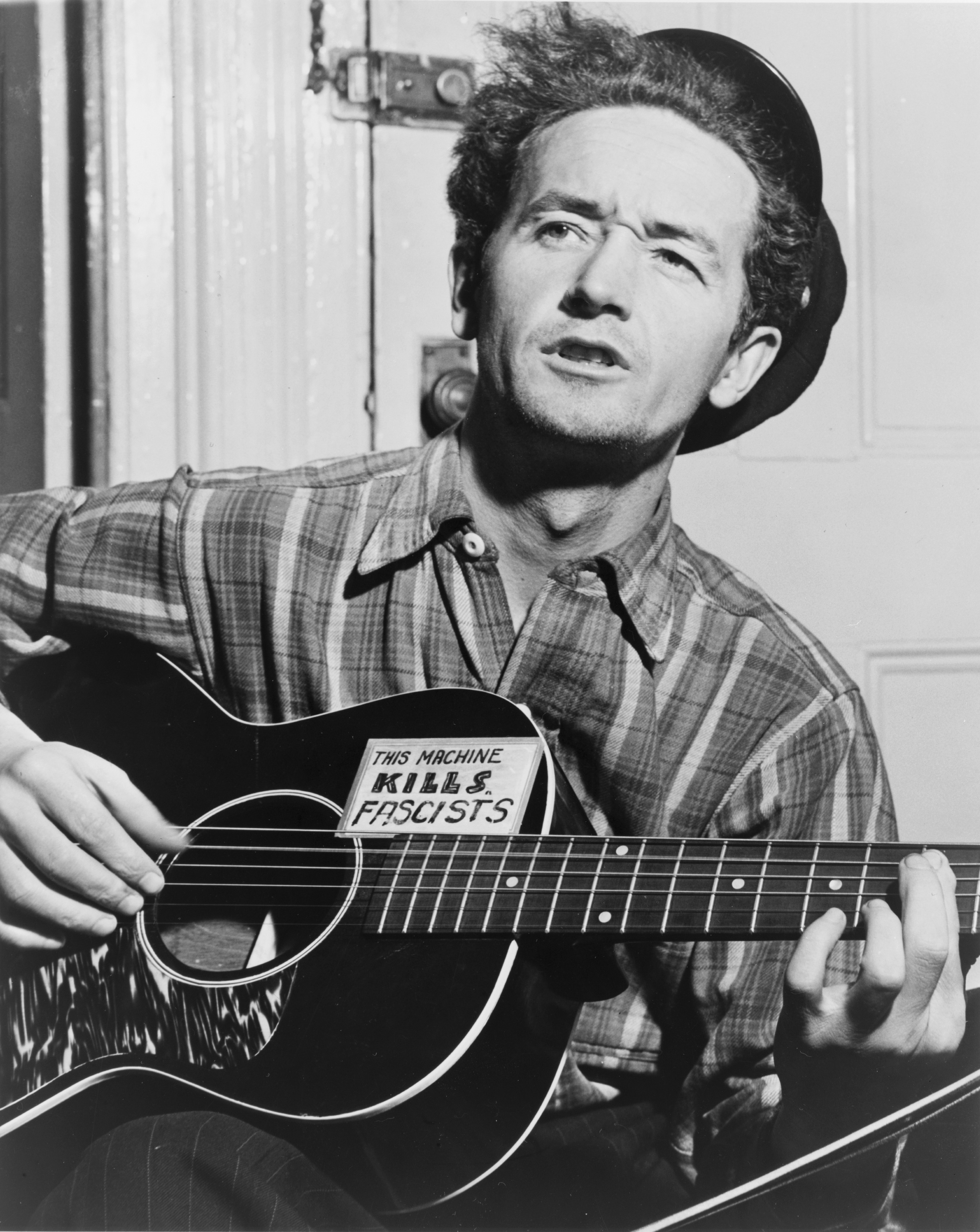
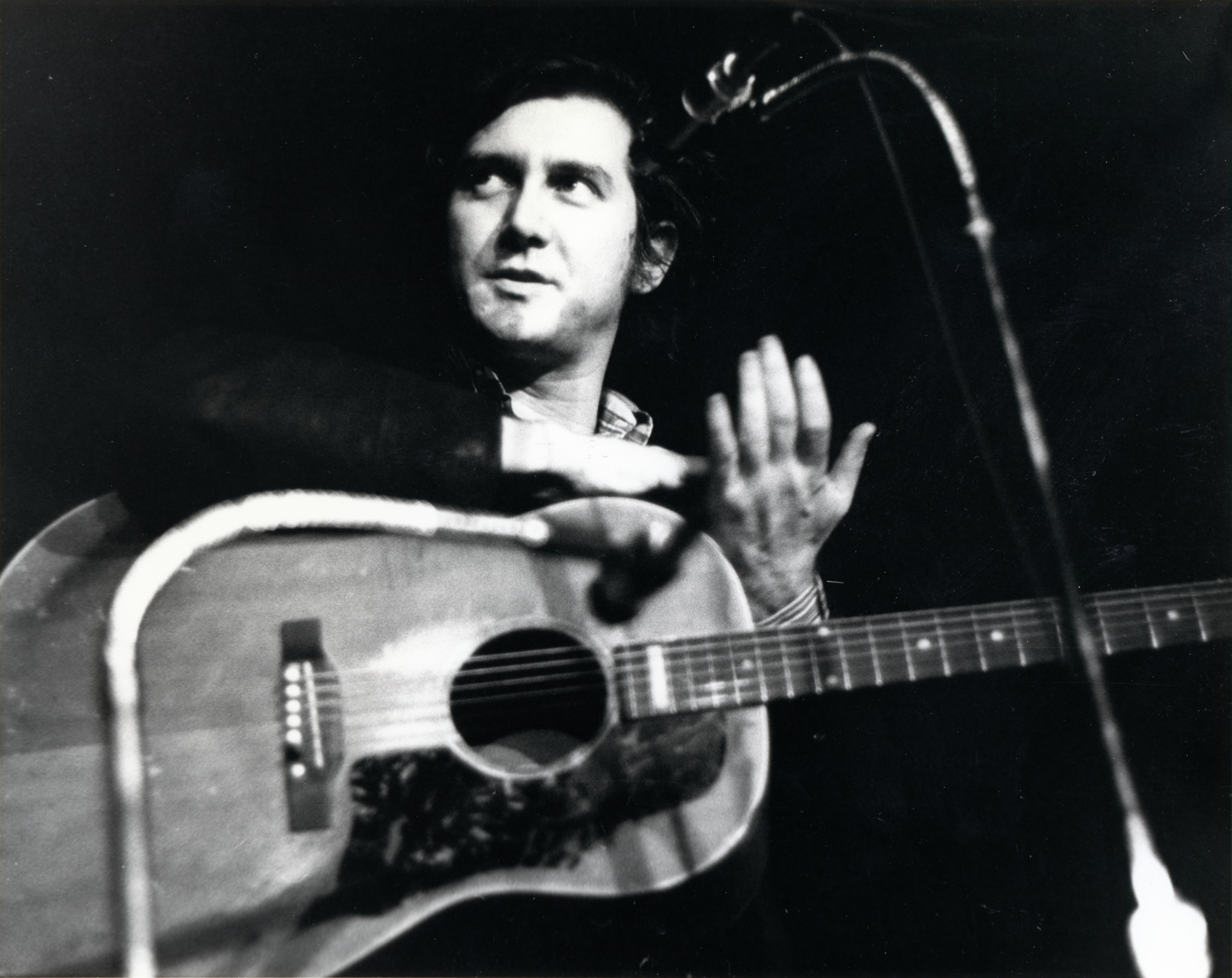
Woody Guthrie and Phil Ochs

The Woody Guthrie Center is a public museum and archive located in Tulsa, Oklahoma that is dedicated to the life and legacy of American folk musician and singer-songwriter Woody Guthrie. The Center also contains the archives of folk singer, songwriter, and fellow social activist Phil Ochs.

== Description ==
The Woody Guthrie Center is located at 102 East Reconciliation Way in the Tulsa Arts District. It features an interactive museum where the public may view musical instruments used by Guthrie, samples of his original artwork, notebooks and lyrics in his own handwriting, and photographs and historical memorabilia that illustrate his life, music, and political activities. Visitors may also view a short biographical film and listen to samples of his music and that of other artists who were influenced and inspired by Guthrie. Various folk music events are sponsored by the Center.

The Woody Guthrie Archives, which is the world's largest collection of material relating to Guthrie's life, are housed on-site in a climate-controlled facility that is partially visible through windows from the public museum area. The archives contain manuscripts, lyrics, correspondence, artwork, scrapbooks, musical recordings, books, and photographs, and are open to researchers by appointment.

== History ==
The Woody Guthrie Center officially opened on April 27, 2013 after the archives were acquired by the Tulsa-based George Kaiser Family Foundation. Previously, the archives were owned by the Woody Guthrie Foundation, which was headed by Guthrie's daughter, Nora Guthrie.

The foundation also operates the nearby Bob Dylan Center, also located within the Tulsa Arts District.

== Phil Ochs archives ==
In September 2014, Meegan Lee Ochs announced that she was donating the archives of her father, singer-songwriter Phil Ochs, to the Center. Ochs was heavily influenced by Guthrie, and was a troubadour and social activist in his own right. The donation of notebooks, photographs, videotapes, and other memorabilia is the first collection included in the center from an artist other than Guthrie.

== Woody Guthrie Prize ==
The Center awards a "Woody Guthrie Prize" annually to "an artist who best exemplifies Woody Guthrie’s spirit and work by speaking for the less fortunate through music, film, literature, dance or other art forms and serving as a positive force for social change." The inaugural prize was awarded to Pete Seeger in 2014 and, as of 2026, the most recent going to Bette Midler.

Other winners include U2, Tom Morello, Pussy Riot, Bruce Springsteen, Joan Baez, and Mavis Staples.

== Virtual Reality "Dust Bowl" exhibit ==
In 2018, the Woody Guthrie Museum announced its plan to host a new program bowl that is intended to offer visitors the opportunity to experience Dust Bowl conditions in the Oklahoma Panhandle during 1934–1938. (Note: The Woody Guthrie Museum already had one of the few permanent exhibits about the Dust Bowl in Oklahoma.) While wearing a virtual reality headset, they will sit on a replica of a front porch, watching a dust cloud roll in across the prairie to envelop them. The Dust Bowl inspired a number of Guthrie's musical works, and led him to take up the causes of migrant workers and other people disenfranchised by an ecological disaster. (Note: The Black Sunday storm on April 14, 1935 is said to have inspired Woody's song, "So long, it's been good to know yuh.")

== See also ==
- List of music museums
