= George Kaiser =

American billionaire businessman

George Bruce Kaiser
- Born: July 29, 1942 (age 84); Tulsa, Oklahoma, US
- Education: Harvard University (BA, MBA)
- Occupation: Businessman
- Website: www.gkff.org/about-gkff/about-george-b-kaiser/

George Bruce Kaiser (born July 29, 1942) is an American billionaire businessman. He is the chairman of BOK Financial Corporation in Tulsa, Oklahoma. As of 2026, he was the 177th richest person in the world with an estimated net worth of $16 billion.

== Early life ==
Kaiser was born on July 29, 1942, in Tulsa, Oklahoma. He attended Central High School in Tulsa. He earned a BA from Harvard College in 1964 and an MBA from the Harvard Business School in 1966. He briefly considered joining the U.S. Foreign Service, but instead returned to Tulsa in 1966 to work for his father. Kaiser-Francis Oil Co. was created in the 1940s by Kaiser's uncle and parents, Jewish refugees from Nazi Germany who settled in Oklahoma.

Kaiser's father, Herman George Kaiser, had been an attorney in the district of the Kammergericht in Berlin until 1933, when he was dismissed by the Nazis because he was Jewish. He and his wife Kate then moved to Rostock where Herman Kaiser worked with his father-in-law Max Samuel's EMSA-Werke company. Herman Kaiser escaped to England in 1937 and his wife and daughter came over in September the following year. In 1940 all three emigrated to the United States. They settled in Tulsa, where Herman's aunt and uncle already lived. Herman joined the uncle's oil drilling business. Their son was born in Tulsa. Herman died in Tulsa on October 14, 1992, at the age of 88.

== Career ==
=== Oil and gas ===
Kaiser took control of Kaiser-Francis Oil Company in 1969, after his father had a heart attack. Kaiser-Francis was a little-known, privately owned oil prospecting and drilling company at the time. Under Kaiser's management, it became the 23rd largest nonpublic energy exploration company in the U.S. by 2010. In that year the company earned about $217 million, based on estimates by Bloomberg News.

=== Banking ===
In 1990, Kaiser bought Bank of Oklahoma out of Federal Deposit Insurance Corporation receivership. Despite BOK's depressed state, it was rich enough to land Kaiser on the Forbes 400 at one stroke. He has since expanded BOK from a 20-branch company located solely in Oklahoma into a $23.9 billion bank with operations in nine states. He owns 61.5 percent of BOK. As of 2007, Kaiser's ownership interests in BOK were worth $2.3 billion. In 2008, with an estimated current net worth of around $12 billion, he was ranked by Forbes as the 20-richest person in America and the richest person in Oklahoma. In March 2009, in the face of the general world economic downturn, Forbes reported that Kaiser's net worth had dropped to $9 billion, ranking him in a tie for 43rd-richest person in the world. As of 2023, Kaiser's net worth was estimated at $13.3 billion.

=== Professional sports ===
In April 2014, Kaiser bought Tom L. Ward's interest in the Professional Basketball Club, the investment group headed by Clay Bennett that owns the Oklahoma City Thunder of the National Basketball Association, as well as its Oklahoma City Blue minor league affiliate.

== Personal life ==
Kaiser's nephew is actor Tim Blake Nelson.

Kaiser's first wife was Betty Eudene, a literacy advocate. Betty died in 2002. The couple had three children and five grandchildren.

Kaiser's second wife is Myra Block. She is the daughter of Tulsa oilman and philanthropist Charles Goodall.

Kaiser is affiliated with the Egalitarian Conservative Congregation B'Nai Emunah.

Kaiser avoids publicity, does not attend society functions and hardly ever gives interviews.

== Philanthropy ==
Kaiser is among those who have made The Giving Pledge, a commitment to give away half of his wealth for charitable purposes.

George Kaiser Family Foundation focuses on early childhood education, economic and community development, maternal and child health, public and charter schools, and criminal justice programs.

== Political activities ==
A Wall Street Journal article reported in 2004 that campaign contribution records showed that Kaiser had donated $10,000 to Democratic Party political candidates for every $1,000 that he gave Republican Party candidates.

Kaiser was a fundraiser for the 2008 presidential campaign of Barack Obama, and functioned as a campaign bundler for Obama. At one 2007 event for Obama, he raised more than $250,000.

A 2011 article by Bill Allison of the Sunlight Foundation analyzed Kaiser's business activities and his use of legal tax avoidance strategies, including how during the 1980s bust in the oil industry in Oklahoma and Texas, Kaiser bought up struggling energy companies whose losses provided him with tax deductions that effectively offset his own income and left him with little or no tax liability.

In 2020, Forbes deputy wealth editor Jennifer Wang awarded Kaiser a perfect philanthropy score of 5, the highest possible rating; placing him among an exclusive group of just ten Forbes 400 members, alongside Warren Buffett, George Soros, Eli Broad, and others who have each given away at least 20% of their fortune.
