= African Americans in Oklahoma =

Ethnic group in Oklahoma

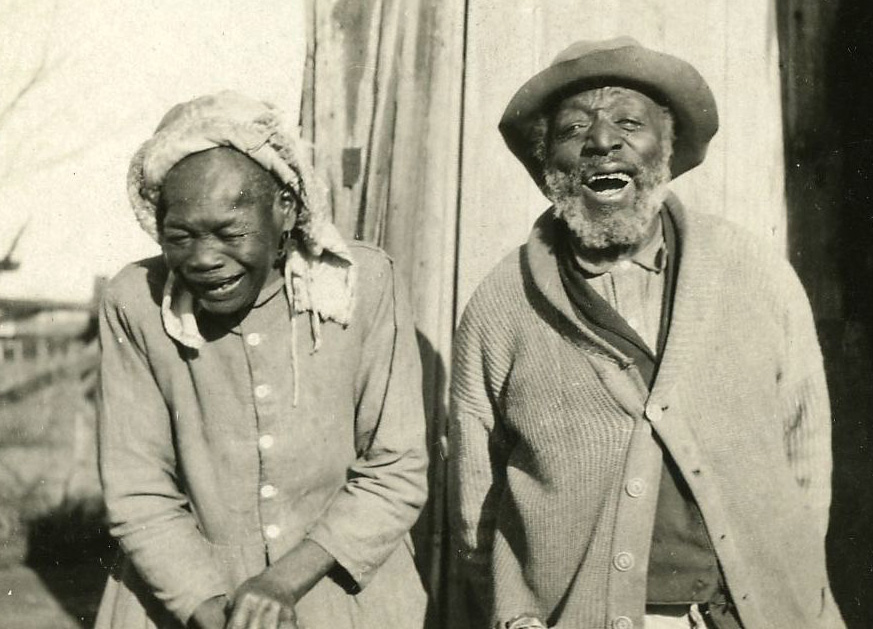
- Elderly African American Sharecroppers in 1914

Total population
- 289,961 (7.8% of the population)

African Americans in Oklahoma or Black Oklahomans are residents of the state of Oklahoma who are of African American ancestry. African Americans have a rich history in Oklahoma. An estimated 7.8% of Oklahomans are Black as of the 2020 census, constituting 289,961 individuals.

African-Americans first settled in Oklahoma during the Trail of Tears. While many of these people were enslaved Africans, around 500 chose to do so in order to escape slavery. During the 19th century, pre-statehood Oklahoma was viewed as desirable for settlement by African-Americans seeking political freedom in the American Frontier. Prior to the institution of Jim Crow laws, multiple Black Oklahomans had served in the territorial legislature.

Oklahoma began instituting Jim Crow legislation in 1897, banning miscegenation and segregating Oklahoma's schools. Racism against Black Oklahomans has been common throughout the state's history, manifesting itself in scenarios such as the Tulsa race massacre, which targeted members of Tulsa's affluent African-American Greenwood District. Today, 13 of the over-50 settlements founded by Black Oklahomans still exist.

== History ==
=== 19th century: Black people in the "Twin Territories" ===
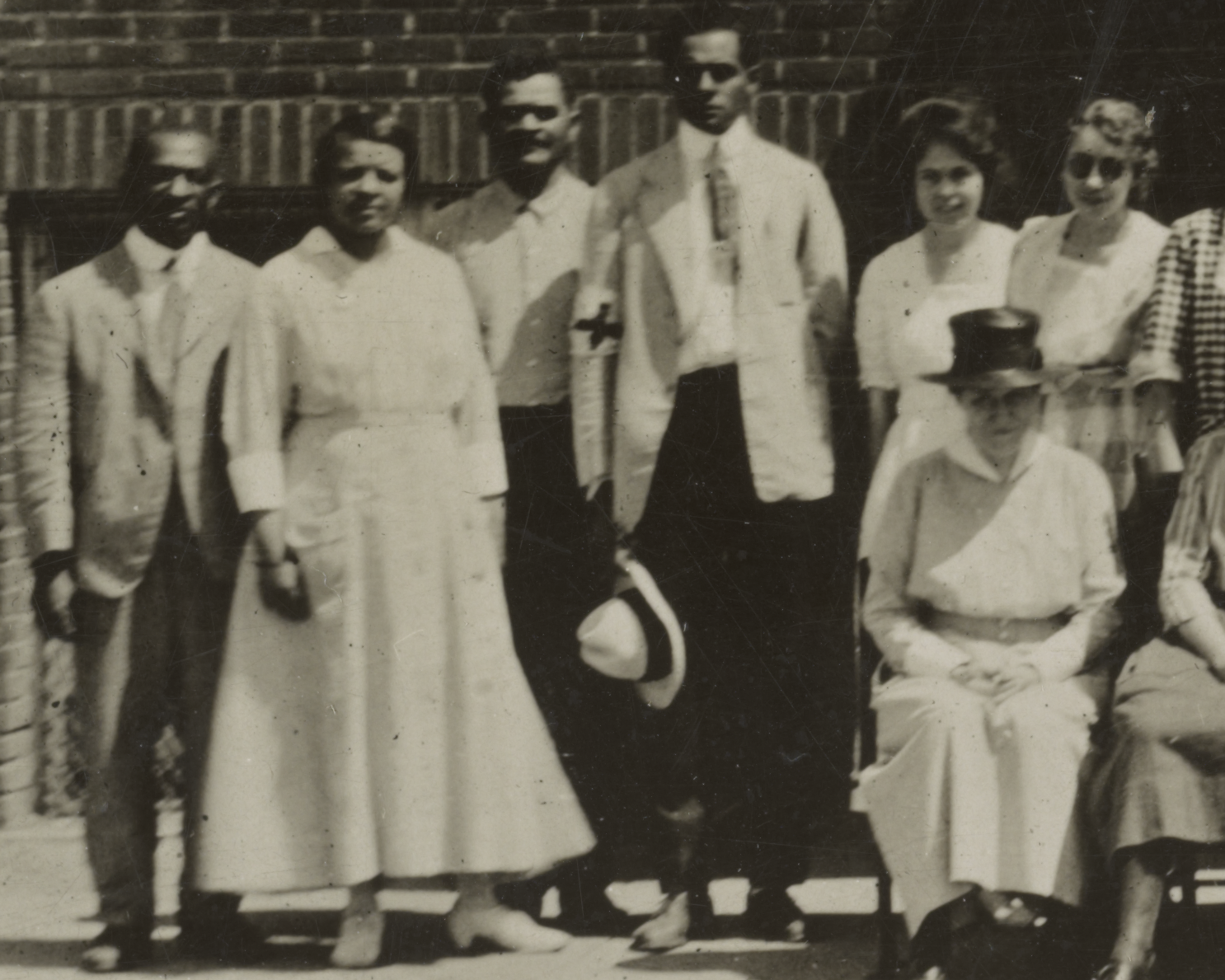
Staff at the American Red Cross disaster relief headquarters in Tulsa, Oklahoma, after the Tulsa race massacre of June 1921

Black slaves came with their Native American slave owners during the Trail of Tears to their new territorial home in Oklahoma beginning in the 1830s. Later in the 19th century, groups of African Americans would migrate to the Oklahoma Territory in the hopes of securing political freedoms.

New York-born Edward P. McCabe, who founded the town of Langston, led a movement to create a Black-majority state in Oklahoma, and pushed for settlement in both the "Twin Territories" of Oklahoma Territory and Indian Territory. McCabe described the region as a "mecca" for Black Americans seeking freedom from oppression.

The Land Run of 1889 led to a sizable increase in African-American settlers in the Indian Territory. Prior to this migration, around 8,000 freedmen lived in the Indian Territory. The increase in Oklahoma's Black population during the Land Run of 1889 was preceded by a similar migration of African Americans to Kansas. Oklahoma is believed to have had the highest population of Black homesteaders of any state.

Tensions would arise at times in the late 19th century in the Twin Territories between Black tribal members and African-American settlers from elsewhere. Creek freedmen would reportedly refer to Black settlers as "state negroes", leading to tensions in towns like Boley, an all-black town founded by settlers. Conversely, there were instances of local Black newspapers founded by settlers criticizing Native American freedmen for selling their land allotments to white settlers.

Two Black Oklahomans, Green I. Currin and David J. Wallace, were elected to the territorial legislature. As late as 1900, it was common for Black and white students in Oklahoma to attend the same schools.

=== 1897-1950s: Jim Crow period ===
Beginning in 1897, the territorial legislature and its successor, the state legislature, enacted Jim Crow laws to restrict African Americans' rights. A total of 18 Jim Crow laws were passed from 1897 until 1957, including laws segregating Oklahoma schools. Miscegenation between white and Black Oklahomas was made a felony subject to five years imprisonment, with a 1921 law banning marriage between Black Oklahomans and Native Americans.

The Edmond Sun noted in 1905 that Oklahoma's Jim Crow laws were extraordinarily strict, even by the standards of the time, stating "Probably no other state or territory has built a stronger barrier against mixed schools". In response to increased oppression, around 1,000 Black Oklahomans chose to migrate to the Canadian provinces of Saskatchewan and Alberta between 1905 and 1911.

==== Racial violence ====
On May 25, 1911, the lynching of Laura and L. D. Nelson, an African-American mother and her child, occurred in Okfuskee County. The Nelsons were among the 75 documented victims of lynching in Oklahoma that took place between 1877 and 1950.

In 1921, members of Tulsa's Greenwood District (nicknamed "Black Wall Street"), home to a large number of African-American businesses, was targeted in the Tulsa race massacre. Considered among the worst incidents of racial violence in American history, it had an estimated death toll between 100 and 300. In the aftermath of the massacre, over 6,000 Black Oklahomans were detained by National Guard agents in internment camps.

=== 1958-present: Civil Rights era and post-segregation period ===
During the civil rights movement, activists including Clara Luper led stage-ins to protest segregation, with Luper leading the 1958 sit-in movement in Oklahoma City. Desegregation would begin in the 1960s, with the Oklahoma City government banning businesses from discriminating on the basis of race in June 1964, a month before the Civil Rights Act of 1964 was passed.

The predominantly African-American Deep Deuce neighborhood of Oklahoma City was bulldozed in the 1980s to make way for construction of the I-235.

Following the end of segregation, Oklahoma City Public School District would remain under court order to institute busing until 1991. In 1990, Republican J. C. Watts would be elected to the Oklahoma Corporation Commission, becoming the first African-American to win statewide office. In 2013, Republican T. W. Shannon would become the first African-American to serve as Speaker of the Oklahoma House of Representatives.

==== Tulsa race massacre recognition efforts ====
Beginning in 2002, the Tulsa race massacre became permitted to be taught in Oklahoma public schools. This marked a shift with the state's approach in past decades, which prohibited its instruction in public schools.

However, an investigation found that many Oklahoma students graduated without learning of the massacre, even after 2012 state standards required more specific language surrounding the event. In 2021, the 1921 Tulsa Race Massacre Centennial Commission was formed.

== Economic conditions ==
Inequalities continue to persist in the 21st century, with Black children in Oklahoma estimated in 2019 to be almost six times more likely to live in concentrated poverty than white peers.

== All-black towns ==
Entirely black towns and neighborhoods were historically common in Oklahoma. From 1865 to 1920, African Americans founded over 50 all-black towns and settlements in the Indian Territory. The Land Run of 1889 contributed to the settlement of African American towns in modern Oklahoma. Thirteen African American towns still exist.

This is a list of all remaining African American towns in Oklahoma:

- Brooksville
- Boley
- Clearview
- Grayson
- IXL
- Langston
- Lima
- Redbird
- Rentiesville
- Summit
- Taft
- Tatums
- Tullahassee
- Vernon

== Black newspapers ==
A list of historically black-owned/edited newspapers, serving primarily black communities, established in Oklahoma.

- Clearview Tribune
- Creek Baptist Herald
- Lawton Community Guide
- The Baptist Informer
- The Beacon
- The Black Dispatch
- The Boley Informer
- The Boley News
- The Bookertree Searchlight
- The Chickasaw Rival
- The Clarksville Echo
- The Clearview Patriarch
- The Langston City Herald
- The Lawton Oklahoma Eagle
- The Lima Observer
- The Lincoln Tribune
- The Muskogee Cimeter
- The Muskogee Lantern
- The New Community Guide
- The Oklahoma Dispatch
- The Oklahoma Eagle
- The Oklahoma Guide
- The Oklahoma Safeguard
- The Oklahoma Tribune
- The Paden Press
- The Paden Times
- The Patriarch
- The Peoples Elevator
- The Taborian Monitor
- The Tulsa Star
- The Wagoner Echo
- The Weekly Progress
- The Western World
- The Wewoka and Lima Courier
- The Wichita Observer

== Notable residents ==
- Green Currin (d. 1918), Republican politician; first African American to serve in the Oklahoma Territorial Legislature
- Lelia Foley (born 1942), Democratic politician who served as mayor of Taft, Oklahoma; often cited as the first Black female mayor in the United States
- William Henry Twine (1864–1933), early African-American lawyer in Oklahoma and publisher of the Muskogee Cimeter
- A. C. Hamlin (1881–1912), Republican politician; first African American in the Oklahoma state legislature
- Barry Sanders (born 1968), American football player and former running back for the Detroit Lions; played for the Oklahoma State Cowboys earlier in his career
- Constance N. Johnson (born 1952), Democratic politician; became first woman U.S. Senate nominee in Oklahoma in the 2014 U.S. Senate election
- T. W. Shannon (born 1978), Republican politician and first Black Speaker of the Oklahoma House of Representatives; candidate for U.S. Senate in 2014 and 2022
- J. C. Watts (born 1957), retired football player and former Republican member of the U.S. House of Representatives for Oklahoma's 4th district
- Edward P. McCabe (1850–1920), Republican politician who aimed to make Oklahoma a majority-Black state

== See also ==
- Choctaw freedmen
- List of African-American newspapers in Oklahoma
- Demographics of Oklahoma
- History of slavery in Oklahoma
- History of Oklahoma
