= List of African American newspapers in Oklahoma =

List of Oklahoma African American newspapers

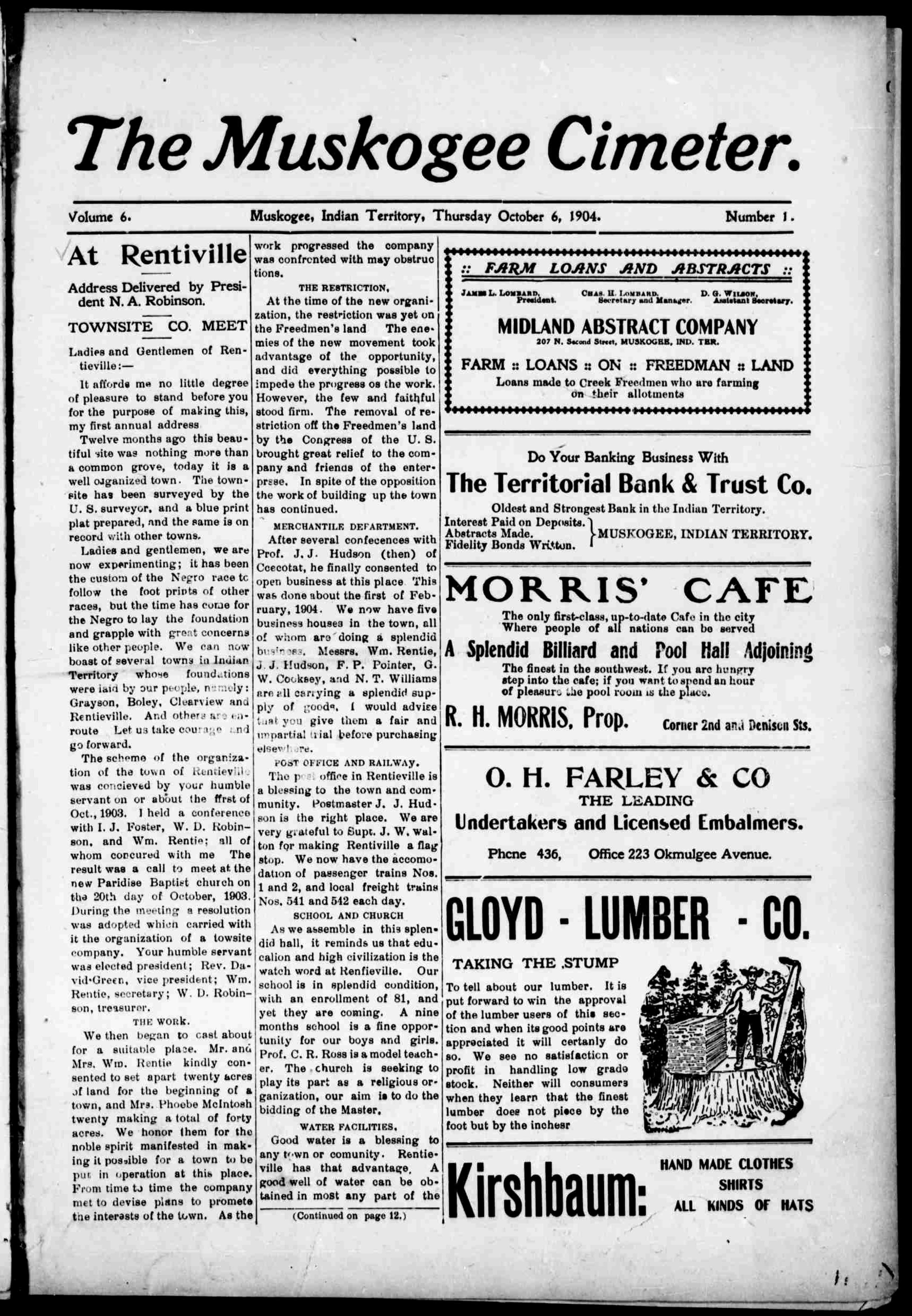
Front page of a 1904 issue of The Muskogee Cimeter, containing a speech marking the establishment of Rentiesville or Rentiville.

This is a list of African American newspapers that have been published in the state of Oklahoma. It includes both current and historical newspapers. The first known African American newspaper in Oklahoma was the Oklahoma Guide (distinct from the later Guthrie publication of the same name), which was a monthly newspaper published in Oklahoma City in 1889. The state's first weekly African American newspaper was The Langston City Herald in 1891.

Many of these early Oklahoma newspapers were published in the many all-Black towns established after the Land Run of 1889. Langston City in particular was home to eleven newspapers from 1891 to 1913.

Notable African American newspapers in Oklahoma today include The Black Chronicle of Oklahoma City and The Oklahoma Eagle of Tulsa.

== Newspapers ==
City	Title	Beginning	End	Frequency	Call numbers	Remarks
Ardmore	The Avalanche	1908	?	Weekly	LCCN sn97070143; OCLC 37472030	Edited by B. J. F. Wesbrooks, G. B. Richards.
Ardmore	The Oklahoma Sun; Indian Territory Sun; Sun	1902	1906	Weekly	Indian Territory Sun: LCCN sn93050594; OCLC 28824424; The Oklahoma Sun: LCCN sn93050592; OCLC 28824436	
Ardmore	The World	1907	?	Weekly		Edited by B.C. Franklin.
Boley	The Beacon; Boley Beacon	1908	?	Weekly	LCCN sn83025053; OCLC 9237325	Edited by E.D. Lynwood.
Boley	The Boley Informer	1909?	?	Weekly	LCCN sn83025054; OCLC 9237376	Published by A.L. Moore.; Attested through at least 1911.
Boley	The Boley News	1914?	?	Weekly	LCCN sn83025100; OCLC 9241485	Published by A.L. Moore.; Billed as the “Official Organ for the Town of Boley, the Largest Exclusive Negro Town in the World.”; Attested through at least 1918.
Boley	Boley Progress / The Boley Progress	1905	1926	Weekly	LCCN sn83025077, sn83025096; OCLC 9238133, 9239064	Published by O.H. Bradley.
Boley	The Boley Trumpet	1924?	?	Weekly		Edited by Elijah J. Burns.
Bookertee	The Bookertee Searchlight	1919?	?	Weekly	LCCN sn83025126; OCLC 9263135	Published by I. L. Leathers.
Castle	Castle News / The Castle News	1908	?	Weekly	LCCN sn83025099; OCLC 9241424	
Clarksville	The Clarksville Echo	1900s	1900s	Weekly	LCCN sn96087762; OCLC 34744591	
Clear View	Clearview Tribune	1904	1904	Weekly	LCCN sn83025118; OCLC 9259034	Published by B.K. Bruce.
Clearview	The Lincoln Tribune	1904	1900s	Weekly	LCCN sn83025117; OCLC 9258639	Published by E.D. Lynwood.
Clearview	The Patriarch / The Clearview Patriarch (1911–1913)	1911	1917	Weekly	LCCN sn83025116, sn83025115; OCLC 9258714, 9258582	Numerous different editors and publishers.
Fallis	The Fallis Blade	1904	1900s	Weekly	LCCN sn93050458; OCLC 26577557	Published by G.W. Hutchins.
Garvin	The Garvin Pioneer	1900s	1910s	Weekly	LCCN sn94058805; OCLC 30330780	Published by W.H. Carroll.
Guthrie	Labor Advocate	1902	1900s	Weekly	LCCN sn83025114; OCLC 9248082	Published by O.O. Blesh.
Guthrie	The Oklahoma Guide	1892	1922	Weekly	ISSN 2643-2137; LCCN sn83025066; OCLC 9235221	Published by G.N. Perkins.
Guthrie	The Oklahoma Safeguard	1894 or 1895	1915	Weekly	LCCN sn83025056; OCLC 9237789	Published by Published by Buchanan Publishing Co., edited by C.A. Buchanan.
Guthrie	The Peoples Elevator	1922	1940s	Weekly	ISSN 2643-2129, 2643-2110; LCCN sn83025058, 2014254006; OCLC 9237938, 664611343	Published in Wichita, Kansas, from February 21, 1924 to October 28, 1926; in Independence, Kansas, from November 4, 1926 to July 24, 1930; and in Kansas City, Kansas from August 19, 1937 to September 19, 1940.; Published by Watton Brown.
Guthrie	The Guthrie Progress	1901	1905?	Weekly	LCCN sn83025045; OCLC 9226755	Published by O.H. Bradley.
Guthrie	The Weekly Sun	1913	1914	Weekly	LCCN sn83025055, sn90050379; OCLC 9237755, 23011591	Edited by J. H. Hubbard.
Langston	Church and State	1911	1911	Weekly	LCCN sn83025133; OCLC 9266557	Edited by E. J. Vance.
Langston	The Langston City Herald	1891	1902	Weekly	ISSN 2158-8929; LCCN 2013254045, sn83025050; OCLC 732734625, 9227089	
Langston	The Western Age	1904	1909	Weekly	LCCN sn83025002; OCLC 9213788	Published and edited by S. Douglas Russell.
Lawton	The New Community Guide	1970?	1977?	Weekly		Published by Robert Goodwin and William P. Kuykendall.
Lawton	The Lawton Oklahoma Eagle	1970? or 1978	1990? or 1980s	Weekly	LCCN sn96087690; OCLC 34573156	Published by James O. Goodwin and Edward L. Goodwin.
Mulhall	The Mulhall Enterprise	1894	1911	Weekly	LCCN sn83025132; OCLC 9266447, 26568162	Published by Willis B. Ehrman.
Muskogee	Muskogee Cimeter / The Muskogee Cimeter	1899 or 1901	1930	Weekly	ISSN 2158-8937; LCCN sn83025060; OCLC 9228536	Free online archive; Published from 1904 to 1921 by William Henry Twine.
Muskogee	The Muskogee Comet	1904	?	Weekly	LCCN sn83025061; OCLC 9228600	Published by J.E. Toombs.
Muskogee	Creek Baptist Herald	1911	1910s	Weekly	LCCN sn95076200; OCLC 33342854	
Muskogee	The Daily Search-Light	1905	1900s	Daily (except Sunday)	LCCN sn83025098; OCLC 9239162	
Muskogee	The Dispensation	1905	1900s	Monthly newspaper	LCCN sn83025059; OCLC 9228491	Published by D.P. Pruett.
Muskogee	The Muskogee Lantern	1926 or 1927	1940s	Weekly	LCCN sn83025097; OCLC 9239073	
Muskogee	The Oklahoma Gazette	1910?	?	Weekly		Edited by William Fields.
Muskogee	The Oklahoma Independent	1936	1960s	Weekly	LCCN sn97064771; OCLC 36421194	Description based on: Vol. 26, no. 3 (Apr. 16, 1954).; Published by M.C. Simmons.
Muskogee	The Muskogee Parrot	1940	?	Weekly		Edited by C. E. Corbett.
Muskogee	The Pioneer	1898	1900s	Weekly	LCCN sn83025062; OCLC 9228966	Edited from 1898 to 1904 by William Henry Twine. Edited subsequently by William A. Rentie.
Muskogee	Saturday Evening Tribune	1912	?	Weekly	LCCN sn83025067; OCLC 9230030	Edited by S. Douglas Russell.; Extant through at least 1913.
Muskogee	Southwesterner	1905	?	Weekly	LCCN sn83025072; OCLC 9230297	Edited by J.T. Nicholson.
Muskogee	The Muskogee Star	1912	1912 or 1913	Weekly	LCCN sn83025068; OCLC 9230090	Edited and Published by A. J. Smitherman.
Muskogee	The Tattler	1915	1917	Weekly	LCCN sn83025091; OCLC 9238744	Published by Ernest D. Lynwood and Robert Jase.
Muskogee	The Weekly Progress	1926	1926	Weekly	LCCN sn83025096; OCLC 9239064	Edited and published by O.H. Bradley.
Muskogee	The Western World	1902	?	Weekly	LCCN sn83025073; OCLC 9230324	Edited by J. C. Leftwich.
Oklahoma City	The Black Advocate	1992	1993	Weekly	LCCN sn96087666; OCLC 34527902	
Oklahoma City	The Black Chronicle	1979	current	Weekly	LCCN sn95076331; OCLC 19836563	Official site
Oklahoma City	The Black Dispatch	1915	1982	Weekly	LCCN sn94084058, sn83025214; OCLC 32353111, 2258388, 18776696, 5149734	Published by Richard Keaton Nash.
Oklahoma City	The Oklahoma City Guide / The Guide (1898–1903)	1897 or 1898	1900s	Weekly	LCCN sn95076408; OCLC 34037722; The Guide: LCCN 2012254014; OCLC 770747612	Attested through at least 1910.; Published by Mattie M. Mallory.
Oklahoma City	The Oklahoma Dispatch	1981	1980s	Weekly	LCCN sn95076087; OCLC 32900258	Attested through at least 1983.; Published by Richard Keaton Nash.
Oklahoma City	The Oklahoma Guide	1889	1889	Monthly / "sporadic"		"We know little else about the journal except the fact of its existence."
Oklahoma City	The Oklahoma Tribune	1907	1910s	Weekly	LCCN sn95076328; OCLC 33822591	
Oklahoma City	The Western World	1900s	1900s	Weekly	LCCN sn83025073; OCLC 9230324	"Published in the interest of the Sango Baptist College and Industrial Institute as well as the Baptist denomination of the Indian Territory."; Attested from at least 1903 to 1905.; Published by J.C. Leftwich and J.W. Capers.
Okmulgee	The Okmulgee Observer	1900s	0000s	Weekly		LCCN sn94091010, sn93062827; OCLC 32651500, 27322198; Description based on: Vol. 6, no. 13 (Feb. 12, 1942).; Microfilm.
Okmulgee	The Okmulgee Observer	1937?	?	Weekly	LCCN sn94091010, sn93062827; OCLC 32651500, 27322198	Published and edited by B.J. Wilson.; Attested through at least 1942.
Paden	The Paden Press	1908	1909	Weekly	LCCN sn83025004; OCLC 9214719	Published and edited by John Young Bryce.
Paden	The Paden Times	1907?	1908	Weekly	LCCN sn83025003; OCLC 9215123	Published by E.E. Tabor and S.T. Peet.
Taft	Taft Enterprise	1910	1914	Weekly	LCCN sn83025011; OCLC 9216478	
Tulsa	The Tulsa Guide	1906	1900s	Weekly	LCCN sn93050465; OCLC 26577650	Published by W.L. McKee.
Tulsa	The Oklahoma Eagle	1922?	current	Weekly	ISSN 0745-385X; LCCN sn94081660, sn83000748, sn96047413; OCLC 32229830, 9114180, 36130353, 5150225	Official site
Tulsa	Oklahoma Sun	1920	1920s	Weekly	LCCN sn93050593; OCLC 28824434	
Tulsa	The Tulsa Star / Tulsa Daily Star	1913	1921	Weekly	ISSN 2163-4866; LCCN sn86064118; OCLC 28910549, 13621345	Free online archive; Edited and Published by A.J. Smitherman; Suffered a "dramatic and untimely demise" following the Tulsa massacre of May 31, 1921. >
Tulsa	Tulsa Weekly Planet	1910s	?	Weekly	LCCN sn93050466; OCLC 26577643	Attested from at least 1912.; Published by Prof. J.H. Hill.
Wagoner	The Wagoner Echo	1904	?	Weekly	LCCN sn96087761; OCLC 34744482	
Wewoka	The Wewoka and Lima Courier	1913	?	Weekly	LCCN sn83025023; OCLC 9216861	Edited by M.W. Williams.

== See also ==
- List of African American newspapers and media outlets
- List of African American newspapers in Colorado
- List of African American newspapers in Kansas
- List of African American newspapers in Missouri
- List of African American newspapers in New Mexico
- List of African American newspapers in Texas
- List of newspapers in Oklahoma

== Works cited ==
- Danky, James Philip; Hady, Maureen E., eds. (1998). African-American newspapers and periodicals : a national bibliography. Harvard University Press. ISBN 9780674007888.
- Williams, Nudie Eugene (1996). "Oklahoma: Genesis and Tradition of the Black Press, 1889-1980". In Suggs, Henry Lewis (ed.). The Black Press in the Middle West, 1865-1985.
