= Alicia Odewale =

African-American university professor and archaeologist

- Born: Tulsa, Oklahoma
- Education: Westminster College (BA) University of Tulsa (MA and PhD)
- Employer: University of Houston
- Website: https://archaeologyrewritten.com

Dr. Alicia Odewale (born 1990) is an American archaeologist and a professor in practice of African American Studies at the University of Houston. Her research focuses on the African diaspora and Caribbean archeology. She is also the president of the Society of Black Archaeologists.

== Early life and education ==
Odewale was born and raised in Tulsa, Oklahoma, where she attended Booker T. Washington High School, graduating in 2006. She earned a bachelor of arts in classics and psychology from Westminster College in Fulton, Missouri in 2009. This was followed by a master of arts in museum science and management (MMM) in 2012 and a PhD in anthropology in 2016, both from the University of Tulsa. As a student, she participated, in 2013, in an assignment to research Tulsa neighbourhood as part of a project by the Oklahoma Historic Preservation Office.

== Career ==
While working on her PhD, Odewale received a fellowship to teach at Augustana College in Illinois. There she taught "Archaeology and History of the African Diaspora" and researched enslaved Africans with royal lineage.

After graduating, she became an assistant professor of anthropology at the University of Tulsa and contributed to the Digital Archaeological Archive of Comparative Slavery. In May 2021, she was featured in the documentary Dreamland: The Burning of Black Wall Street. In 2022, she gave lectures around the country on "Greenwood: A Century of Resilence" as part of the National Geographic Live lecture series about the 1921 Tulsa race massacre. In July 2024, Odewale was collaborating with Parker VanValkenburgh of Brown University on a potential African-American Studies curriculum that combines primary sources and science.

In September 2024, Odewale became a professor of practice in African American Studies at the University of Houston, where her class "Before Cowboy Carter: Black Towns, Black Freedom" gained popular attention. In the class, Odewale used Beyoncé's album, Cowboy Carter, as a device for teaching students about the forgotten Black history of the American West.

Odewale research focus is African-American history and Caribbean archaeology. Odewale founded the Greenwood Diaspora Project and worked on the Estate Little Princess Archaeology Project in St. Croix, U.S. Virgin Islands. She also leads the Mapping Historical Trauma in Tulsa 1921–2021 project into the historic Black Wall Street and is executive director of the Archaeology Rewritten consulting firm. She is also a National Geographic Explorer speaker, instructor, and curriculum contributor.

== Awards and honours ==
While attending Tulsa, Odewale received a fellowship from the American Anthropological Association and a doctoral dissertation improvement grant from the National Science Foundation. In 2019, she won one of the university's Equity Awards.

== Notable publications ==
- Odewale, Alicia, H. Thomas Foster, II, and Joshua Torres (2017). "In Service to a Danish King: Comparing the Material Culture of Royal Enslaved Afro-Caribbeans and Danish Soldiers at the Christiansted National Historic Site" Journal of African Diaspora, Archaeology & Heritage 6(1): 1–39.
- Odewale, Alicia (2019). An Archaeology of Struggle: Material Remnants of a Double Consciousness in the American South and Danish Caribbean Communities. Transforming Anthropology 27(2): 114–132. DOI:10.111/traa.12165.
