= History of slavery in Oklahoma =

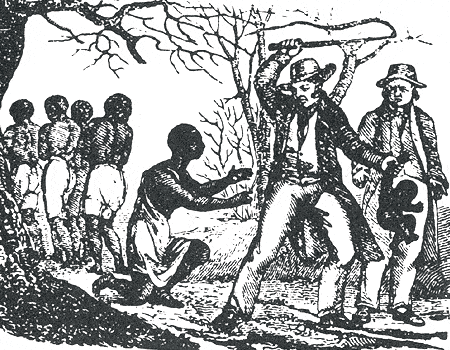
Cartoon depiction of slavery in the Southern United States

The history of slavery in Oklahoma began in the 1830s with the five Native American nations in the area: Cherokee, Chickasaw, Choctaw, Creek, and Seminole. Slavery within these Native American nations began simply by placing a lower status on them than their master. The slavery in these tribes varied in style, being specifically different from American slavery. Slavery in the area continued to grow for many years, even throughout the entirety of the Civil War. The growth was significant, slaves making up a portion of the population in the new Indian territory. Slavery ended in the Oklahoma area with the completion of the Civil War. Treaties were made with the nations regarding citizenship and slavery for African Americans. The repercussions of slavery that followed greatly affected the state, with prominent racial issues.

== History ==
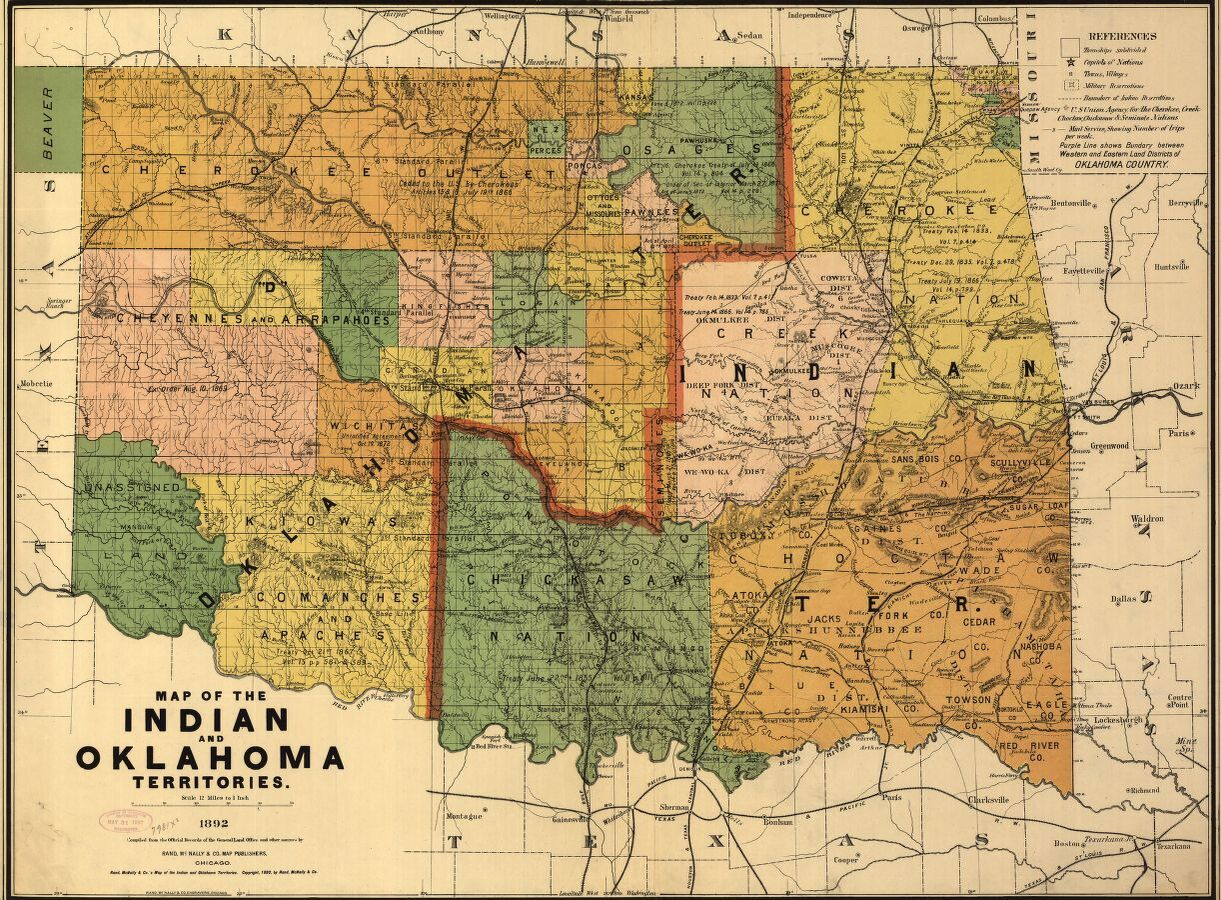
Map of the Indian and Oklahoma Territories 1892

=== Origins ===
Native Americans had long taken other people as prisoners in a form called captive-taking. They would replace a lost servant or family member with another to fulfill the sexual or labor needs. With the Creek Indians, slaves were treated almost as prisoners of war but through time and hard work, could elevate their status in society and become part of the family that owned them. As European influence strengthened, Native Americans joined the slave trade and became owners of black slaves themselves. If a Native woman married an African man, him and their children would be free of servitude, and could rise in the ranks of the community.

After the American Revolution, Native Americans signed the Treaty of Holston in 1791, which had the Cherokee adopt a sedentary and farming-based life in which the United States would provide the basics for them. These basics included slaves for manual labor, and a majority of Euro-Cherokee individuals used them. Though some pure-blooded Cherokee members held slaves, a majority of slaveholders were of European descent, as they were taught the benefits of slavery from their family. For decades, these slaves provided labor, relations, and translation to settlers, becoming a part of Indian culture and history.

Because slaves mostly did the work that women did, they were looked down on as inferiors in some tribes. The reason for the switch from traditional captive-taking to chattel slavery is disputed, but many believe it was on the basis of assimilation. Assimilation occurred either from government force or in an effort to prevent removal. Tribes became "westernized" as Europeans and American settlers moved through and tribal leaders of mixed race rose to power.

=== Indian Removal Act ===
In 1830 the Indian Removal Act forced southern Indian nations out of their land and into new territories further west, the treaty stated that the options were to give up the land and move to the west or become citizens to the state. This was the reason for the movement of the Cherokee, Chickasaw, Choctaw, Creek, and Seminole to the land which would one day become Oklahoma. With these nations moving to the west, they brought with them black people, including slaves. This was the beginning of slavery in the land of Oklahoma. When the Cherokees were relocating, it was estimated that ten to fifteen percent of the nation were African Americans.

This nation in particular brought not slaves, but freed blacks. This was one of the main reasons that they were forced out of their previous land. The nation had become a safe space for slaves to run away to and slave owners wanted to diminish that possibility for slaves in the south.

With the forced removal of the five nations into the land of Oklahoma throughout the course of time, slavery began and progressed in the Indian territory. Specifically, in the Choctaw and Chickasaw nations, slavery and the ownership of black people became common. Beginning in Mississippi, both nations became very familiar with the idea of slavery. Following the Indian Removal Act those nations brought slavery into the Indian territory that became Oklahoma. As time continued, both nations would buy and sell slaves through other slave owners and slave traders.

=== 1842 Slave Rebellion ===
On the Joseph Vann plantation in 1842, slaves locked their masters in their homes and stole supplies. The escaping Cherokee slaves met Creek slaves and headed to Mexico, where slavery was illegal. The group of 35 runaways were eventually caught or executed by a Cherokee-ordered militia.

=== Civil War ===
The first Confiscation Act was passed August 6, 1861, and declared that the Union could seize property used in the rebellion. Most of this property was slaves. The second corresponding act was passed July 17, 1862, and authorized the seizure of property from traitors, not just the Confederacy. It also stated that slaves captured by the Union would be emancipated . Neither law was fully executed and therefore did not free the slaves living in Oklahoma, as Lincoln was scared the pressure put on southern and border states would cause them to secede, and the emancipation of Confederate slaves could only be applied to Union-occupied areas in the South. The laws did, however, put more emphasis on the slavery aspect of the War, evident in the battles fought in Indian territory to preserve their right to hold slaves.

Cabin Creek was located by the Texas Road on Indian Territory, becoming the site of two Civil War battles. The road was used by both Union and Confederate forces to supply nearby forts. The first battle was between July 1 and 2, 1863, as Confederate troops aimed to seize a wagon train. Union troops waited until the next day to send infantries across the creek, eventually driving out Confederate forces. On the Union side, the First Kansas Colored Infantry was the first black infantry to fight alongside white soldiers in the Civil War.

The second battle, occurring September 19, 1864, consisted of Confederate soldiers capturing 300 wagons, surprising them by attacking at night. The First and Second Cherokee regiments, the First and Second Creek regiments, and the Seminole Battalion fought with the Confederacy, ultimately leading to the successful capture of 130 wagons and 740 mules. The Second Battle of Cabin Creek was the last battle in the Civil War fought on Indian Territory.

== Post-Civil War ==
=== Reconstruction and post-slavery racism ===
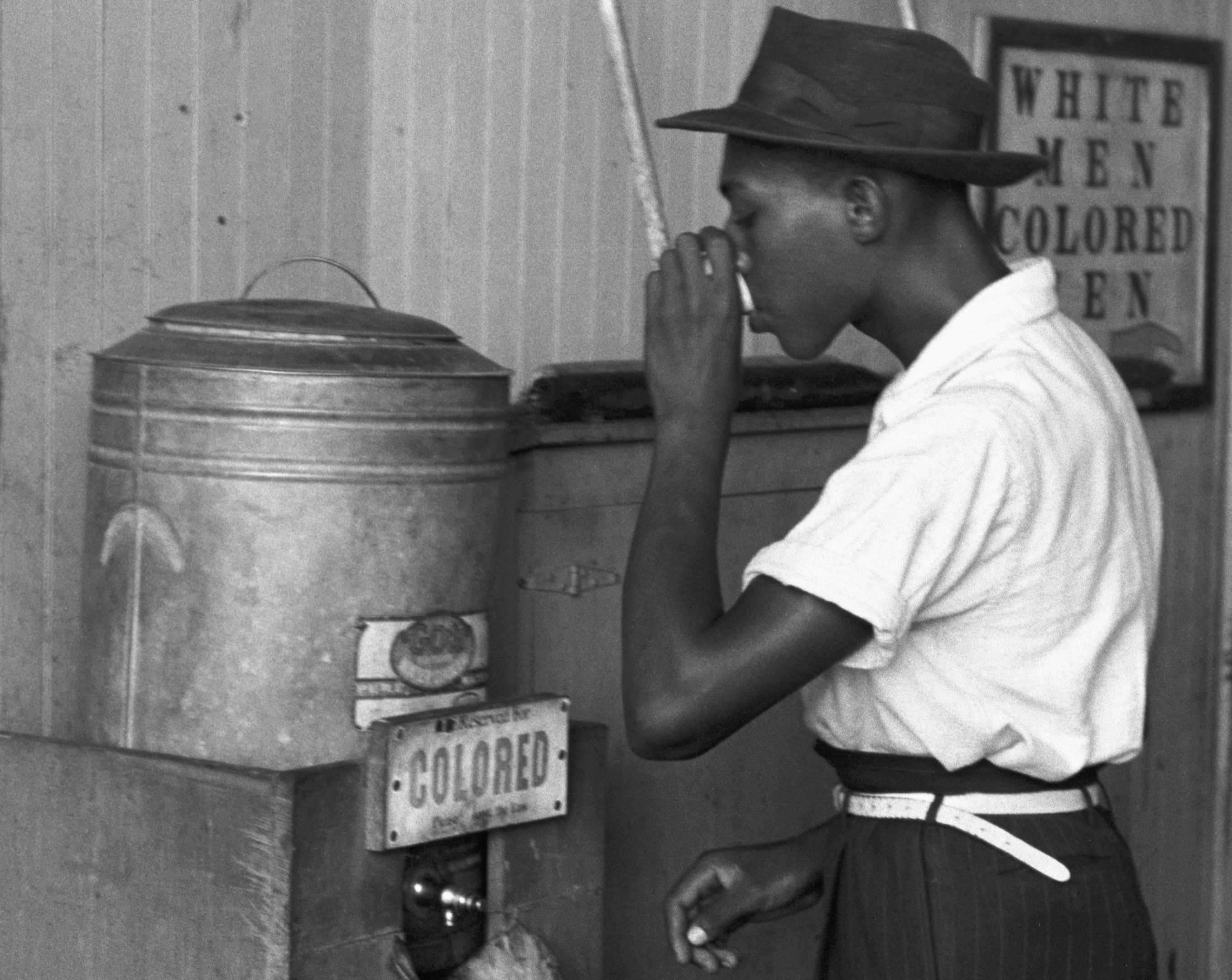
African-American drinking at "Colored" water cooler in streetcar terminal, Oklahoma City, Oklahoma

The end of the Civil War had a different impact on each of the Five Nations on the Indian Territory. As part of a series of treaties, in 1866 the federal government required Indian nations to emancipate their slaves. Not all of the nations immediately banned the practice, and the eventual demise of slavery came slowly. Three of the five nations abolished slavery at the end of the Civil War, the Choctaw and Chickasaw nations did not. Nations that governed themselves did not have the immediate need to get rid of slavery, thus causing those two nations to be much slower to remove slavery. It was not until the following year that both nations joined a treaty to abolish slavery. Changes, specifically in the Choctaw and Chickasaw Nations, came slowly. Even after the emancipation, the masters were violent and harsh to those previously enslaved to them.

Many Native Americans and African Americans struggled to find the correct meaning of equality, freedom, and their relation. This led the topic of race to be a constant narrative in the history of Oklahoma. The people continually struggled to understand citizenship. Throughout the time period of reconstruction there were multiple black towns that were formed in the Indian territory. There were more black towns on the territory than anywhere else in the United States. These towns were created to give African Americans the chance to avoid white surveillance and experience freedom within their own communities. The many issues in reconstruction were prominent and led to segregation. Segregation was found specifically in schools in the late 1800s, each county making segregation decisions.

=== Tulsa race massacre ===
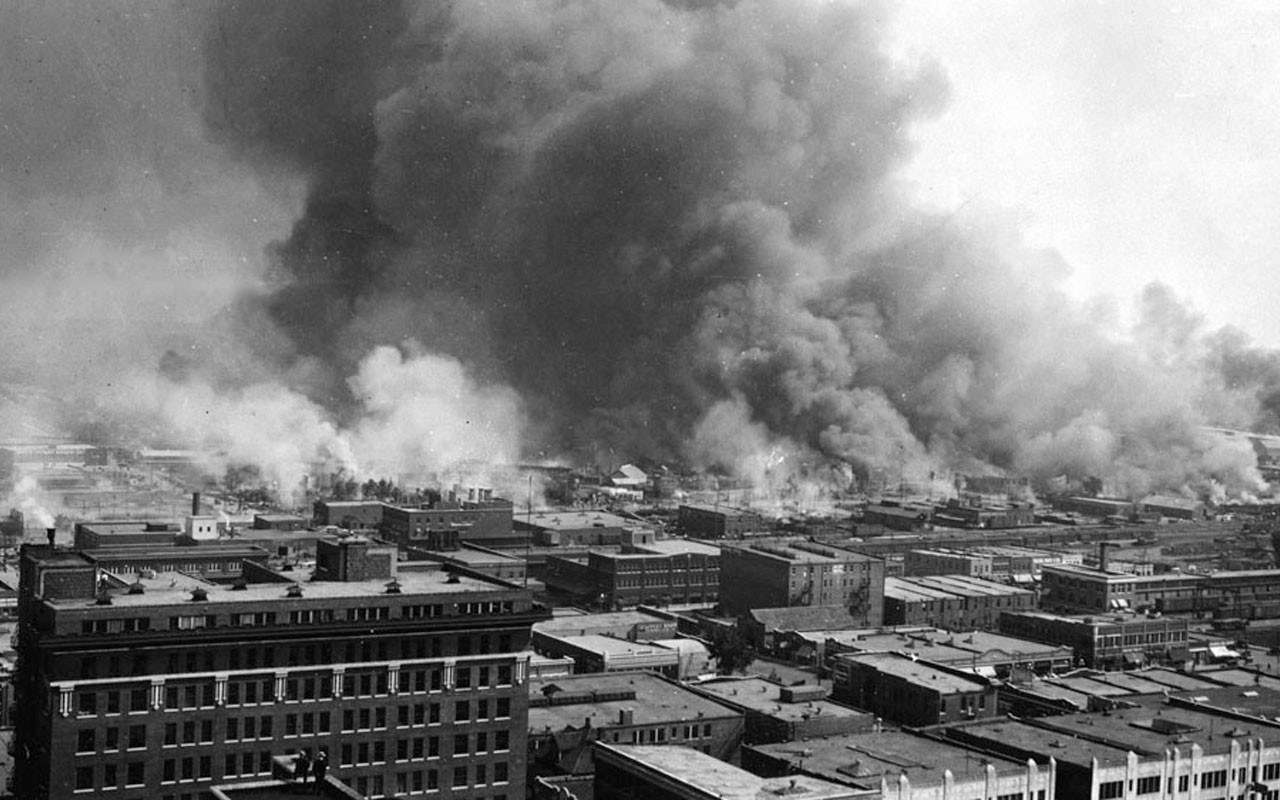
A building on fire during the Tulsa race massacre, 1921

In the 1910s, Tulsa was the oil capital of Oklahoma, or the world as some claimed. The oil industry caused Greenwood, the African American side of Tulsa, to boom, being coined "Black Wall Street". On May 30, 1921, Dick Rowland stepped into an elevator to reach the segregated bathrooms in Drexler Building, and was assisted by Sarah Page, the white female operator. Stepping out of the elevator, Page claimed that 19-year-old Rowland assaulted her.

Though the police did not charge Rowland, newspapers ran with the rumors, and Rowland faced death. A group gathered outside Tulsa County courthouse jail, with some demanding the man be lynched, and others protecting him. Shots were then fired, with 12 dying. Various shootings and vandalisms occurred through the end of the day, but tensions escalated through the first week of June as machine guns and air bombing was employed, intent on destroying Greenwood. In all, over 1500 homes were burned or looted. After receiving a telegram from Tulsa's mayor, the Red Cross set up residence in Oklahoma, treating Greenwood's citizens as prisoners of war. The Red Cross left Tulsa on December 31, 1921, after months of aid.

=== 2017 court ruling ===
In 2017, a federal court ruling ensured that African Americans who were descendants of those owned by the Cherokee were entitled to tribal citizenship and the rights thereof. The ruling stated, "[eligible] Freedmen descendants, upon registration as Cherokee Nation citizens shall have all the rights and duties of any other native Cherokee, including the right to run for office."

== See also ==
- History of Oklahoma
