= A. J. Smitherman =

American lawyer, journalist, and civil rights activist

- Born: Andrew Jackson Smitherman; December 27, 1883; Childersburg, Alabama
- Died: June, 1961 (age 78); Buffalo, New York
- Education: University of Kansas; Northwestern University; La Salle University
- Occupations: Founder and publisher: Muskogee Star, Tulsa Star, and Buffalo Star
- Years active: 1908-1961
- Political party: Republican Party (before 1911); Democratic Party (after 1911)
- Spouse: Ollie B. Murphy

Andrew Jackson Smitherman (December 1883 - June 1961) was an American lawyer, journalist, and civil rights activist. Smitherman began his journalism career in 1908 in Muskogee, Oklahoma where he wrote for the Muskogee Cimiter before founding the Muskogee Star in 1912. He later founded the Tulsa Star after moving to Tulsa, Oklahoma in 1913. Smitherman was a community leader of the Greenwood District in Tulsa, Oklahoma until the Tulsa Race Massacre. After the massacre, Smitherman was falsely accused of inciting a riot, and left the state. He eventually settled in Buffalo, New York, where in 1932 he founded the Buffalo Star.

== Early life and education ==
Andrew Jackson Smitherman was born in Childersburg, Alabama on Dec. 27, 1883. He was the second of eleven children. His father owned a coal business and his mother was a schoolteacher. His family moved to Indian Territory when he was a child. After finishing secondary school, he attended the University of Kansas and Northwestern University. He earned his Juris Doctor from La Salle University and studied in Chicago and Boston.

== Journalism ==
Smitherman began his journalism career at William Twine's Muskogee Cimiter in 1908. In 1909, he became vice-president of the Associated Negro Press and in 1910, he became the president of the association, a position he would hold until 1921. In 1912, he established his own paper the Muskogee Star. In 1913, Smitherman moved to Tulsa, where he founded the Tulsa Star, which would continue to publish until the Tulsa Race Massacre in 1921.

The Star was a Democratic Party aligned newspaper, which was uncommon for African American newspapers of the time, which tended to lean Republican. Smitherman advocated self-reliance and resistance to the mob violence and lynchings African-Americans faced. In 1919, he was selected as a delegate to meet Woodrow Wilson during his visit to Oklahoma City. After an outbreak of lynchings in Oklahoma in 1920 Governor James B. A. Robertson organized an interracial conference and invited Smitherman to be one of the African American leaders involved. In response to violence against African Americans, Smitherman argued for black communities to arm themselves and organize to prevent lynchings.

=== Tulsa Race Massacre ===
The Tulsa Star encouraged readers to take up arms to defend prisoners at risk of being lynched. Smitherman wrote in the Star that the lynching of Roy Belton, "explodes the theory that a prisoner is safe on the top of the Court House from mob violence." When residents reacting to the arrest of Dick Rowland gathered at the offices of the Tulsa Star, Smitherson is alleged to have directed them to go to the courthouse, where violence initially broke out.

During the ensuing Tulsa Race Massacre on June 1, 1921, the printing press and editorial offices of the Tulsa Star were destroyed. Smitherson's home was also destroyed. He was forced to leave Tulsa in the aftermath of the massacre, and fled to Massachusetts with his wife and five children after prosecutors attempted to prosecute him for inciting a riot in relation to the massacre. In 1925, he moved to Buffalo, New York, where he founded the Buffalo Star in 1932. Other states did not comply with Oklahoma's requests for extradition, and the indictment was dismissed posthumously in 2007.

== Death and legacy ==
Smitherman died in Buffalo, New York in June 1961 and is buried in Mt. Calvary Cemetery. He was posthumously inducted into the Oklahoma Journalism Hall of Fame in 2020–2021.

== See also ==
- National Association of Black Journalists Hall of Fame
- Tulsa Outrage
