= Roy Belton =

Lynching victim

Roy Belton (1900 or 1901 – August 28, 1920) was a 19-year-old white man arrested in Tulsa, Oklahoma with a female accomplice for the August 21, 1920, robbery and murder of a white man, local taxi driver Homer Nida. He was taken from the county jail by a group of armed men, after a confrontation with the sheriff, and taken to an isolated area where he was lynched.

== Background ==
Nida, hospitalized with a gunshot wound to the stomach, had identified Belton as the person who robbed and shot him. Belton confessed after being arrested, but told police the shooting was an accident. Rumors began to spread of mob justice if Nida died. While Nida was hospitalized, local newspaper the Tulsa Tribune published Belton's photo and said that he "planned to escape on a plea of insanity". Nida died a week after being shot, and his wife was quoted as saying "I hope that justice will be done for they have taken an innocent life and ruined my happiness. They deserve to be mobbed but the other way is better".

That night a crowd gathered at the Tulsa County Court House, where the county jail was located on the top floor. Several armed men entered the building, where they confronted Sheriff James Wooley and ordered him to release Belton. They took Belton outside and drove him in his victim's taxi to a lonely road near Jenks, about nine miles (fourteen kilometers) outside Tulsa, and lynched him. At the scene, local police kept onlookers away from Belton and his captors and directed traffic.

== Aftermath ==
Governor James Robertson condemned the lynching and tried to remove Sheriff Wooley from his elected position. An all-white grand jury investigated, but indicted no one. Police Chief John Gustafson stated his disapproval of mob rule, but also warned that the public in Tulsa was not prejudiced against such an action. Both the Tulsa Tribune and the Tulsa World, capitalizing on sensationalism, published editorials that spoke approvingly of the mob action.

A. J. Smitherman, editor of the black-owned newspaper, Tulsa Star, realized that, if a mob could lynch a white man, no black man would be safe if he were jailed. Later, he warned that blacks should take matters into their own hands if another black were arrested.

The next year another teenager Dick Rowland was arrested on a complaint from a white woman (Rowland was black) who was not his alleged victim. The Tulsa Tribune published inflammatory material about the incident. Aware of the failure of Tulsa police to defend the white Belton against a lynch mob, a large armed group of black men marched to the courthouse in the night offering to help the sheriff's deputies defend Rowland when a crowd gathered outside the courthouse. The Sheriff said they did not need assistance. Hours later an armed confrontation took place outside the courthouse, and the Tulsa Race Massacre of 1921 broke out.

== See also ==
- Mass racial violence in the United States
