= Stewart Castle =

Stewart Castle may refer to:

- Stewart Castle, Jamaica
- Stewart Castle, Northern Ireland

== See also ==
- Castle Stewart (disambiguation)
