= Silent Witnesses: The Black Heritage Tree Project =

Archaeological project

Silent Witnesses: The Black Heritage Tree Project is an archaeological project that began in 2024, funded by the National Geographic Society through the Meridian grant program. The project received support for a collaborative team comprising Alicia Odewale, Justin Dunnavant, Clinton Johnson, Nick Okafor, Kristi Williams, and James Edward Mills. They will work alongside descendant communities, historians, forestry experts, and educators in Oklahoma, Texas, and the U.S. Virgin Islands to create a Global Black Heritage Tree Map. The aim of this project is to document generations of Black freedom stories by the year 2027.
