= Castle Stewart =

Castle Stewart may refer to:

- Castle Stewart (Washington, D.C.), a mansion
- Earl Castle Stewart, a title in the Peerage of Ireland

== See also ==
- Castle Stuart, a tower house in Scotland
- Stewart Castle (disambiguation)
