= Stewart Castle, Jamaica =

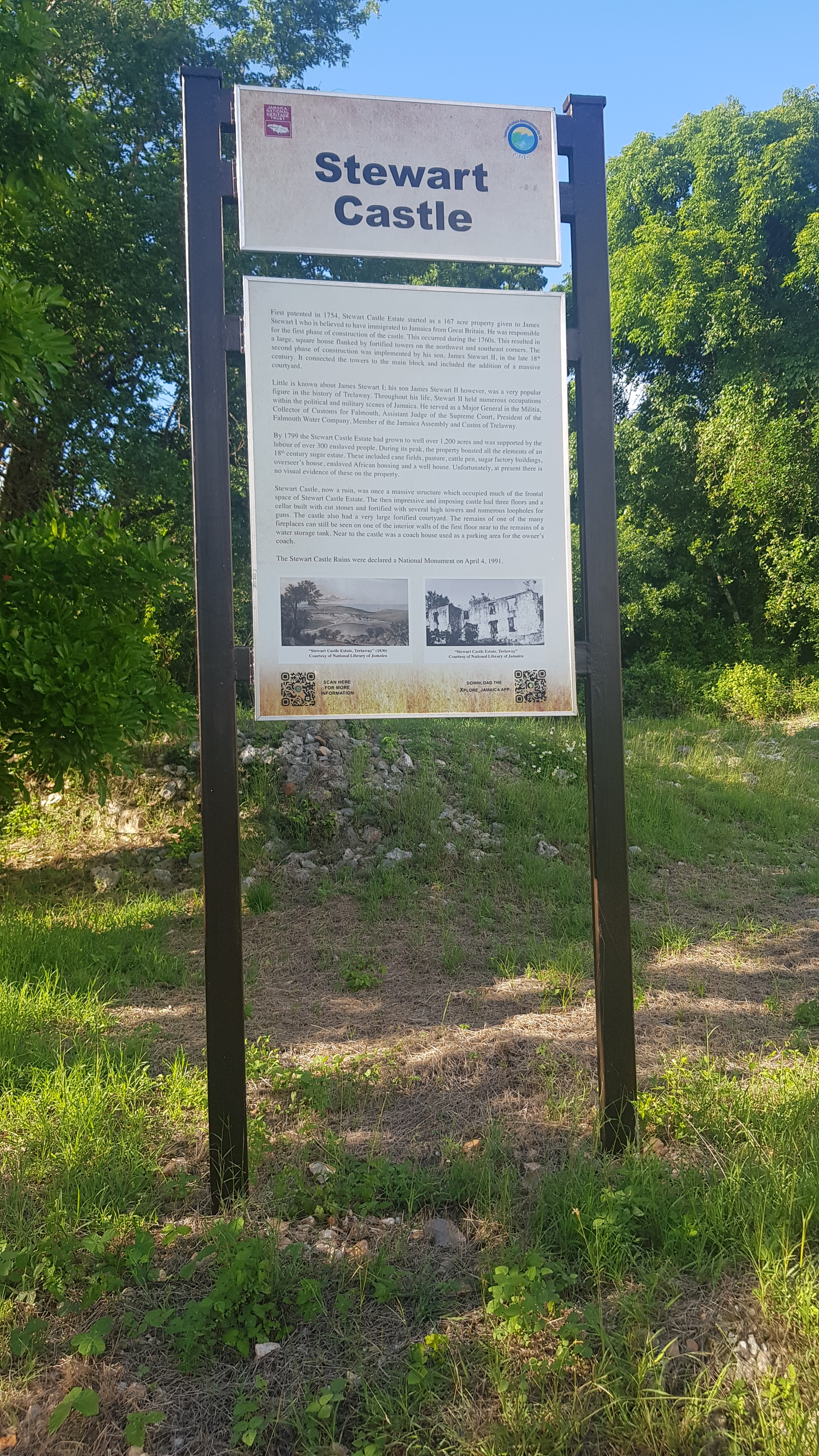
Jamaica National Heritage Trust information board at the site of Stewart Castle.

Stewart Castle was a sugar plantation in Trelawney, Jamaica.

It was established in 1754 by local planter James Stewart. It was inherited by his son, known as James Stewart II, who mortgaged the estate in 1799. The estate was 1,230 acres in extent, of which nearly 500 were planted with sugar cane.

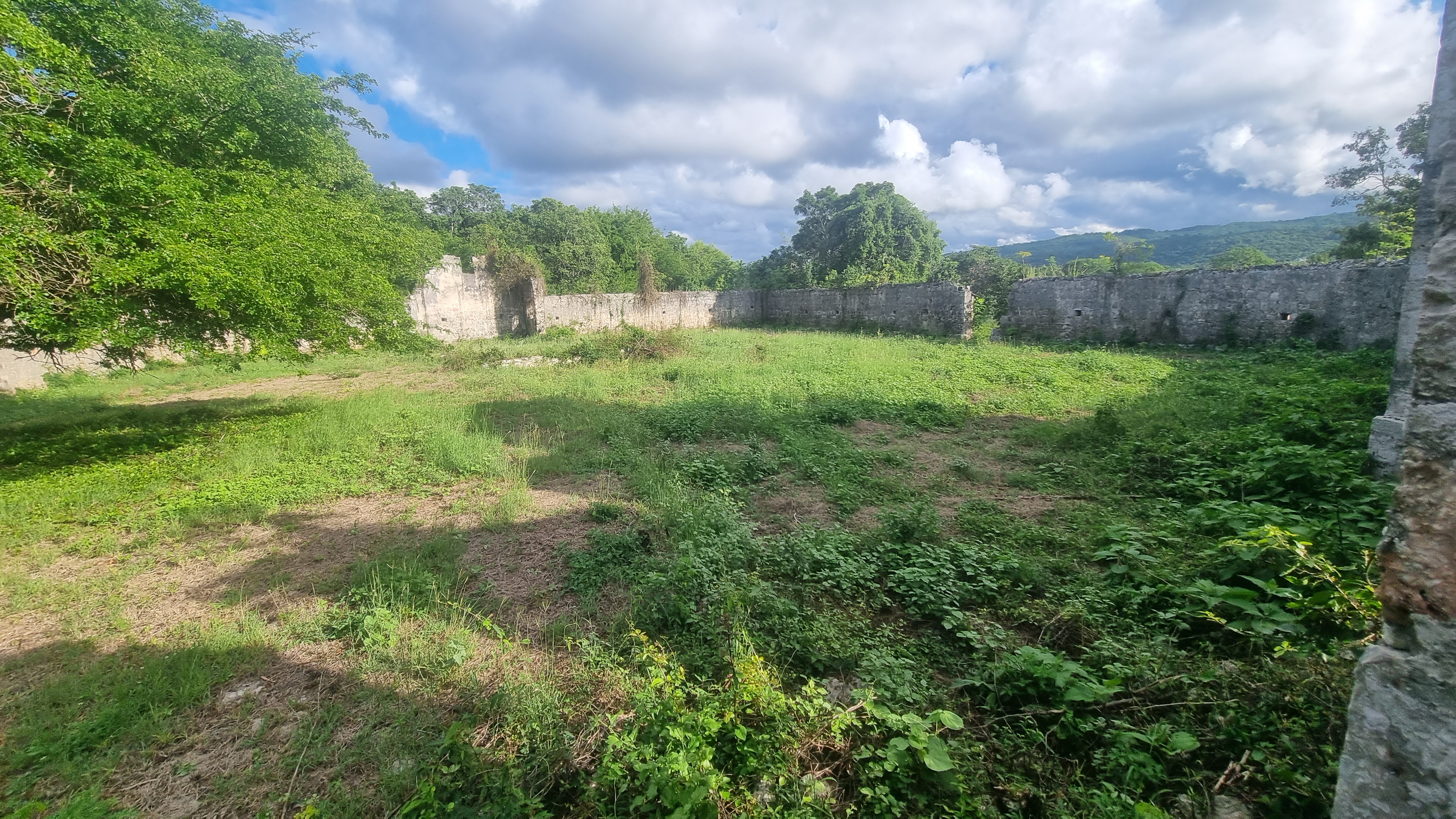
A view of the armoured courtyard of Stewart Castle.

The property was gifted to the Jamaica National Trust Commission, the predecessor to the Jamaica National Heritage Trust (JNHT), in 1960, by the Kaiser Bauxite Company. In 2007, there were archaeological excavations at the site carried out by the Digital Archaeological Archive of Comparative Slavery (DAACS). In 2010, the JNHT considered a proposal to aesthetically develop the site.
