= James Stewart II =

Jamaican politician and militia officer

James Stewart (1763 – 4 August 1828) was a Jamaican politician and militia officer who elected to the House of Assembly of Jamaica in 1820 representing Saint Andrew Parish.

== Family life ==
He inherited Stewart Castle in Trelawney Parish, Jamaica from his father, known locally as James Stewart I. He was the grandfather of Stewart Campbell the Canadian politician.

== Political career ==
Stewart was the Custos for Trelawney Parish 1800–1821. In this capacity he was one of the Commissioners who established Stewart Town, near the border of Trelawney Parish with Saint Ann Parish. He was also a lieutenant colonel in the Jamaica Militia in which capacity he played a prominent role in the Second Maroon War (1795–6) leading the third column of the Trelawney militia.

== Author? ==
Views differ as to whether Stewart was in fact the author of A Brief account of the Present State of the Negroes in Jamaica written under the name of James Stewart and published in Bath in 1792.
