= Bookertee, Oklahoma =

- Ghost town
- Location within Oklahoma Location within the United States
- Coordinates: 35°22′2.35″N 96°5′0.01″W
- Country: United States
- State: Oklahoma
- County: Okfuskee
- Elevation: 761 ft (232 m)
- Time zone: UTC-6 (Central (CST))
  - Summer (DST): UTC-5 (CDT)

Bookertee is a ghost town in Muskogee County, Oklahoma, United States. Bookertee is a historical all black town. It was most likely named after Booker T. Washington, a famous African-American educator. Nothing remains there, except the railway that runs through it.
