= Stewart Town =

Town in Trelawny Parish, Jamaica

Coordinates: 18°23′N 77°27′W

Stewart Town is a historic town that was established in Trelawny Parish, Jamaica in 1812. It was named after James Stewart, the Custos for Trelawney Parish 1800-1821.
