= Langston City Herald =

Defunct African American newspaper in Oklahoma

The Langston City Herald was an African American newspaper in Langston, Oklahoma. Edward P. McCabe founded the paper in 1891 for the express purpose of increasing black settlement into the Oklahoma Territory. It claimed some of the responsibility for the establishment and expansion of Langston, which McCabe envisioned as a kind of "black mecca". The paper dissolved in 1898.

== Background ==
After its land was opened to settlement in 1889, a significant number of African Americans – many of them from Kansas – moved into the Oklahoma Territory. Among those advocating for black settlement in the territory was W. L. Eagleson, a journalist by trade, who supported movement into the Oklahoma Territory with his settlement company. Another was Edward P. McCabe, who initially desired for the territory to become a state for African Americans, though by 1890, his desire waned and he mostly helped in settlement efforts. He especially worked to establish Langston as a thriving city exclusively for African American settlers – a town envisioned as a kind of "black mecca", according to one report.

== Publication and demise ==
The Langston City Herald debuted on May 2, 1891, as a weekly newspaper for Langston's African American community. Eagleson served as its editor, and McCabe was its founder (and, for a time, also edited). The paper's primary purpose was to increasingly settle the Oklahoma Territory by African Americans.

Following the Land Run of 1891 – spurred by the opening of Sac and Fox Nation lands – several black settlers entered the region, and the paper wrote that it was responsible. It implored people to leave the Southern United States to the Cherokee Outlet, and a significant number settled there. It was a strong proponent of Langston becoming a vibrant black city of opportunity. It warned those living in the South that relocating to the territory "may be your last chance for a free home", and it argued that the region's geography was superior in quality to others. Though it sought black settlers entering the Oklahoma Territory and establishing communities, it was primarily concerned with the economy of the territory. It was Republican in political orientation (though it warned Republicans that black voters may flee the party if it did not meet their needs), and it advocated for black suffrage. It denounced the violent race riot that occurred in Spring Valley, Illinois, in 1895, calling that city's Italian population "a band of lousy, dirty, despicable, low bred, treacherous dago miners".

The paper was commercially successful, and it had around 4,000 subscriptions in its first year. Lee J. Meriwether became the editor of the paper around 1893. It dissolved in 1898. One of the paper's mottos – "COME PREPARED OR NOT AT ALL" – is featured in Toni Morrison's 1993 novel Paradise.
