= Society of Black Archaeologists =

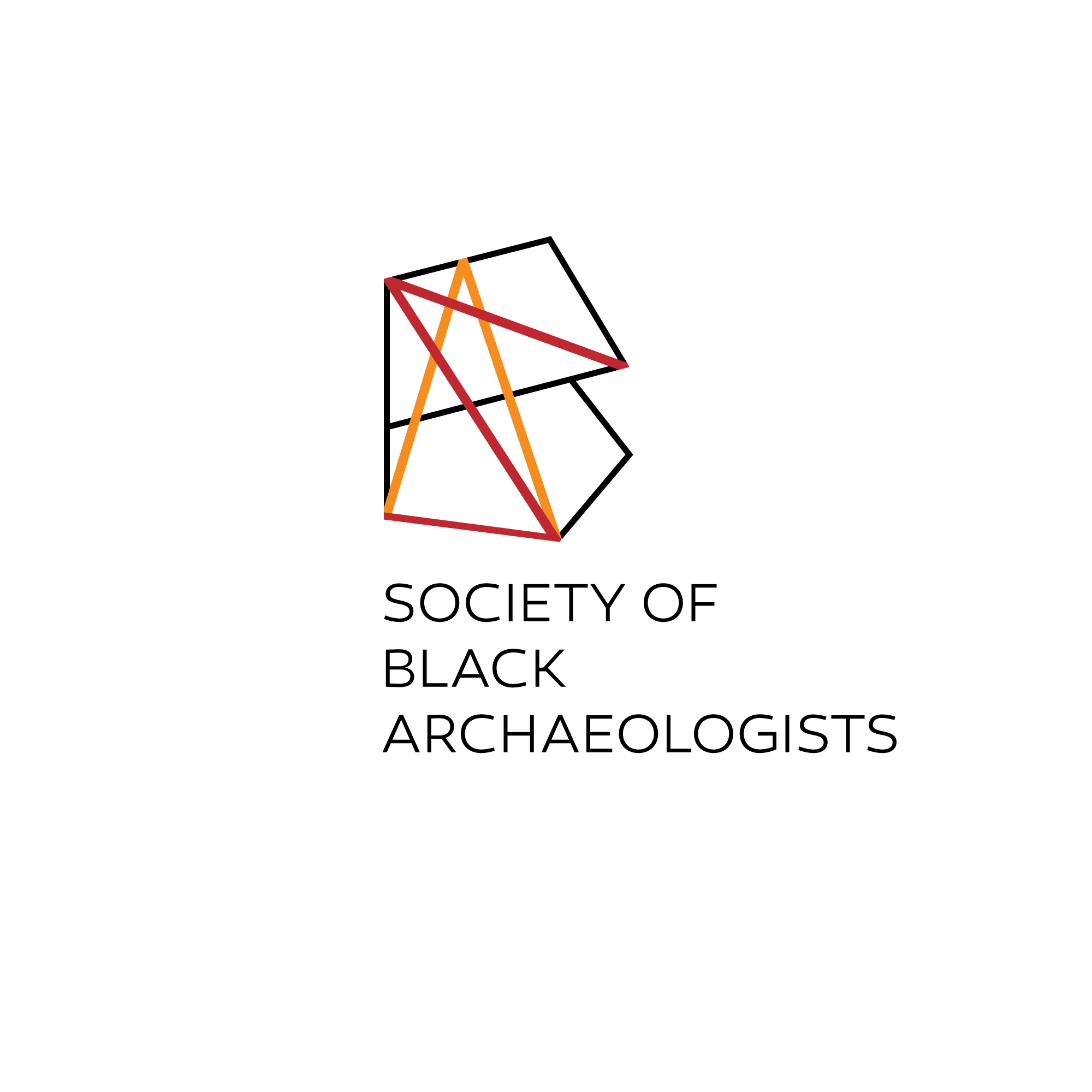
Society of Black Archaeologists Logo

The Society of Black Archaeologists (SBA) is an international organization of Black archaeologists. The Society was founded in 2011. The founding board members are Drs. Justin Dunnavant, Ayana Omilade Flewellen, Jay Haigler, Alexandra Jones, and Cheryl LaRoche.

== Mission ==
"The mission of the Society of Black Archaeologists (SBA) is to promote academic excellence and social responsibility by creating a space for Black archaeologists and other scholars who support SBA’s goals and activities".

The goals of the Society of Black Archaeologists include:

1. To lobby on behalf and ensure the proper treatment of African and African Diaspora material culture
2. To encourage more people of African descent to enter the field of archaeology
3. To raise and address concerns related to African peoples worldwide
4. To highlight the past and present achievements and contributions that people of African descent have made to the field of archaeology
5. To ensure the communities affected by archaeological work act not just as objects of study or informants but are active makers or participants in the unearthing of their own history.

== Annual Meeting ==
The first meeting of the Society of Black Archaeologists SBA took place at the annual meeting of the Society for Historical Archaeology (SHA) in Baltimore, Maryland, in 2012. In 2019, SBA held its annual meeting at the 2019 Conference on Historical and Underwater Archaeology in St. Charles, Missouri.
