= The Oklahoma Eagle =

Tulsa-based black-owned newspaper

- Type: Weekly newspaper
- Format: Broadsheet
- Owner: James O. Goodwin
- Founder: Theodore Baughman
- Publisher: James O. Goodwin
- Editor: Jeanne M. Goodwin
- Founded: 1922
- Language: English
- Headquarters: Tulsa, Oklahoma
- OCLC number: 9114180
- Website: theokeagle.com

The Oklahoma Eagle is a Tulsa-based Black-owned newspaper published by James O. Goodwin. Established in 1922, it has been called the voice of Black Tulsa and is a successor to the Tulsa Star newspaper, which burned in the 1921 Tulsa race massacre. The Oklahoma Eagle publishes news about the Black community and reported on the 1921 Tulsa race massacre at a time when many white-owned newspapers in Tulsa refused to acknowledge it. The Oklahoma Eagle is also Oklahoma's longest-running Black-owned newspaper. The Oklahoma Eagle serves a print subscriber base throughout six Northeastern Oklahoma counties, statewide, in 36 U.S. states and territories, and abroad. It claims that it is the tenth oldest Black-owned newspaper in the United States still publishing today.

== History ==
The Oklahoma Eagle started in 1922 after the 1921 Tulsa race massacre. African American businessman Theodore Baughman salvaged a printing press from the burned-out building of the Tulsa Star. The Tulsa Star was Tulsa's first Black-owned newspaper and was known as the "voice of Black Tulsa" with its coverage of the everyday lives of black Tulsans as they celebrated weddings, mourned at funerals, and marked graduations and anniversaries.

In 1936, Edward L. Goodwin Sr., also known as E. L. Goodwin, purchased The Oklahoma Eagle and added the slogan, "We make America better when we aid our people" to the paper's masthead. Edward L. Goodwin was a businessperson who owned rental properties in the Greenwood District of Tulsa and a shoeshine parlor. Edward L. Goodwin lived through the 1921 Tulsa race massacre and knew many who had died or lost loved ones and property; he purchased the newspaper in part to ensure that Tulsa would not forget its history.

The Oklahoma Eagle is tied to two historic newspapers, The Tulsa Star and the Oklahoma Sun. The Star was originally founded by publisher and editor Andrew Jackson Smitherman – who was also a justice of the peace and an attorney – as a daily newspaper, The Muskogee Star, in 1912. He was the first African American newspaper editor and publisher to produce a long-running daily in the state of Oklahoma. A year later, Smitherman moved to Tulsa and established the Tulsa Star. Smitherman hired businessman James Henri Goodwin, a Mississippi native with a fourth-grade education who migrated to Tulsa, as his business manager in 1916. Theodore Baughman, a pioneer in journalism in Kansas and Texas and a longtime advocate for racial equality, served as the Star's managing editor. Baughman left the Star and established the competing Oklahoma Sun on June 20, 1920.

On May 31, 1921, a race massacre – ignited on a wave of sexual assault rumors after a black teen jostled accidentally against a white woman in an elevator inside the Drexel Building – plunged Tulsa into a week-long act of unprovoked violence against the city's African American citizenry, economic, political and faith-based institutions. The deadly barbarian attack, which spanned every aspect of life within Tulsa, is recognized as one of the most heinous acts of domestic terrorism within the United States.

After losing the Star and his home in the massacre, Smitherman left Tulsa and eventually settled his family in Buffalo, New York.

Baughman remained in Tulsa, salvaged the Star's equipment and renamed his newspaper, The Oklahoma Eagle, opening its first office at 117 North Greenwood Avenue. In 1933, James H. Goodwin's son, Edward L. Goodwin Sr., became interested in buying the newspaper, but was repeatedly rebuffed by Baughman.

In 1936, the younger Goodwin prevailed, and Baughman allowed him to invest capital in the newspaper. Goodwin became the sole owner after Baughman died in 1937, and he relocated the paper to 126 North Greenwood Avenue.

Edward Goodwin said he purchased the Eagle, because he was tired of being vilified by the white Tulsa “metropolitan press” that disparagingly labeling him as “the black mayor of the City of Tulsa… because of the fact that I had become involved in all of these illegal operations. … So, the metropolitan press was so strong in their accusations against me, I said, ‘Well, I guess this is a good thing for me to do. I'm going to buy one of these papers.’”

Goodwin said he was initially motivated to use the Eagle to help restore and reshape his reputation as a successful businessman. Goodwin said he also discovered that his mission was far more consequential as a newspaper owner. “… I decided that I would dedicate the rest of my life fighting for the things that I knew that black people needed and never had in order to elevate them to a higher social level, a higher economic level, then that they'd been accustomed to.” He stamped this mission below the masthead, “We Make America Better When We Aid Our People.”

Two years later, Goodwin moved our headquarters to 123 North Greenwood into a building owned by his father. In 1966, the Tulsa Urban Renewal Authority declared plans to build the Crosstown Expressway by bulldozing our land and displacing dozens of black-owned businesses and properties. The Goodwins built a new, modern building across the street at 122 North Greenwood. (The site today is ONEOK Field and home to the Tulsa Drillers’ Double A minor league baseball team). The paper remained in Greenwood until the 1980s, when it moved to three different locations – before settling at current headquarters, 624 East Archer Street, formerly home to Mabrie's Garage and Storage.

The Oklahoma Eagle is the last surviving original black-owned business still operating within the historic Black Wall Street footprint.

The Oklahoma Eagle also publishes sister editions, such as The Okmulgee Observer, The Muskogee Independent (in the 1940s and later renamed as Eagle newspapers), The (Lawton, Oklahoma) New Community Guide, The Wichita (Kansas) Observer, and an Oklahoma City Eagle edition.

== Ownership ==
In the 1970s, Edward L. Goodwin retired from The Oklahoma Eagle after running it for almost 40 years, and turned over operations to his youngest son, Robert K. Goodwin, who oversaw the paper for 10 years. Robert K. Goodwin was also named by President George H. W. Bush as the executive director of the White House Initiative on Historically Black Colleges and Universities. He was also the CEO of the Points of Light, a nonprofit organization that encouraged volunteer service.

In the 1990s, Robert K. Goodwin handed the paper to his brothers, Edward L. Goodwin Jr. and James O. Goodwin. Edward L. Goodwin Jr. studied journalism at Pittsburg State University in Kansas, and died in 2014. He was known for his meticulous grammar and his dedication to the preservation of the Greenwood District (also known as Black Wall Street) in Tulsa. His daughter is Regina Goodwin is a member of the Oklahoma House of Representatives representing the 73rd district, which includes Tulsa's primarily African American community and the Historic Greenwood District. Regina was also an editorial cartoonist for the newspaper.

James O. Goodwin continues as publisher. James O. Goodwin is a prominent attorney in Tulsa. He is a graduate of the University of Notre Dame and the University of Tulsa College of Law. As a lawyer, he successfully argued before the U.S. Supreme Court and Oklahoma Court of Criminal Appeals for the constitutionality of local statutes regarding freedom of speech, and he was co-counsel in the matter of reparation for victims of the 1921 Tulsa race massacre. In addition to practicing law, James O. Goodwin served on the Tulsa City-County Board of Health for over fifty years, and the Tulsa Health District's East Regional Health Center was named for him in 2018.

== Prominent staff ==
Thelma Thurston Gorham was editor from 1954 to 1955, during which time her front-page editorials on racial integration won an award from the National Council of Christians and Jews and national recognition for the paper. In 1963, Gorham began teaching at Florida A&M University in Tallahassee, Florida, and founded its Department of Journalism.

Carmen Fields began working at the paper as a high school student in the 1960s. Fields later became a Nieman Fellow at Harvard, a Boston Globe editor, and a reporter for Boston's WHDH and WGBH. During her time at the Boston Globe, she was part of the team that won a Pulitzer Prize in Public Service for coverage of school desegregation issues in Boston.

Benjamin Harrison Hill was an editorial page editor from 1951-1971. He was also pastor of the historic Vernon AME Church in the Greenwood District for two decades. Hill served two terms in the Oklahoma state legislature, and he also was active with the Tulsa Urban League and was president of the Tulsa chapter of the NAACP. A park and recreation center in Tulsa is named after him.

Eagle editor Edgar T. Rouzeau worked at the New York Herald Tribune and was the first African American to be accredited to cover World War II.

Luix Virgil Overbea, who served stints both as city editor and sports editor, became one of the first blacks to integrate a Southern newspaper, the Winston-Salem Journal and Sentinel in North Carolina. He later worked for the Associated Negro Press, St. Louis Sentinel, the St. Louis Globe-Democrat and the Christian Science Monitor.

Editor and columnist Don Ross later worked as a columnist and assistant managing editor at the Post-Tribune in Gary, Indiana. He was a celebrated writer who formed an alliance with syndicated columnists Art Buchwald, Russell Baker, Erma Bombeck and Andy Rooney to create an unofficial club, the “Academy of Humor Columnists.” As an Oklahoma legislator, Ross sponsored the bill that created the Tulsa Riot Commission that conducted the first serious investigation into the 1921 Tulsa race massacre.

== Legacy ==
In the 1990s and 2000s, The Oklahoma Eagle, like many other Black newspapers in the U.S., suffered from a decline in revenue and filed for bankruptcy. However, James O. Goodwin and several members of the Goodwin family helped keep it afloat through their investments of time and money, and the paper continues to operate as the "conscience of Tulsa." The publisher has been quoted as saying that he is relieved that The Oklahoma Eagle is still around to mark the approaching centennial of the Tulsa race massacre in 2021 and a changing Tulsa.

== Honors ==
E. L. Goodwin was inducted into the Oklahoma Journalism Hall of Fame in 1980. Edward L. Goodwin Jr. and James O. Goodwin were inducted in 2015. Robert K. Goodwin received the 2020 Lifetime Achievement Award from the Oklahoma Journalism Hall of Fame.

On June 11, 2022, The Oklahoma Eagle received a Sequoyah Award for Community Leadership, the highest award a newspaper can receive through the Oklahoma Press Association’s Better Newspaper Contest. The Eagle received five first place awards, most notably honoring our year-long series “Of Greenwood,” an initiative of content – print and digital sponsored by Liberty Mutual Insurance – that chronicled the Historic Greenwood District’s legacy and contributions to agriculture, the arts, economy, entrepreneurs, education, health care, government/politics, music, the performance arts and religion.

The Eagle also received first place awards in three other categories: In-Depth Reporting; Column Writing; and Front Page Design.

The Eagle received second place in Editorial Writing and two for third place in News Content (for the May 28, June 4 and Aug. 6 editions) and Digital Media (a video that accompanied the “Of Greenwood” series that documented “Agriculture in North Tulsa: 1899-Present.”)
