= Digital Archaeological Archive of Comparative Slavery =

The Digital Archaeological Archive of Comparative Slavery (DAACS) is an ongoing Internet-based research and archival initiative of the Thomas Jefferson Foundation meant to advance the historical understanding of slavery and slave-based society in the United States and the Caribbean in the time before the American Civil War. The project was initially founded in 2000 with funds from the Archaeology Department of Monticello, the historical home and plantation of Thomas Jefferson and a modern UNESCO World Heritage Site. The project's goals include cultivating collaboration between scholars of multiple disciplines and the sharing and open access to American slavery-related archaeological data.

In addition to organizing and conducting physical excavations of slavery-related archaeological sites throughout the Chesapeake region, the Carolinas, and the Caribbean, the project maintains a free, online, publicly available SQL database of detailed archaeological recordings from sites related to the slavery of Africans in North America and the Caribbean. The data are systematically recorded using a single set of classification and measurement protocols, enabling researchers to perform both cross-site and within-site analyses on available data.

== 3D laser scanned artifact images ==
In 2008, with funding from the US National Endowment for the Humanities and the UK Joint Information Systems Committee, the DAACS began a project to provide three-dimensional laser scans of Afro-Caribbean artifact sherds as part of its online dataset. 3D image files are created using a NextEngine 3D Scanner HD at a resolution of 40,000 points/in², using 3D digital scanning techniques established by the University of California, San Diego Levantine and Cyber-Archaeology Laboratory. Though the project is currently limited to Afro-Caribbean sherds from select sites, the DAACS has stated plans to expand the project to scanning ceramic and non-ceramic artifacts from sites throughout the Atlantic region. All 3D scan files (.obj) and constituent image files (.jpg) are publicly available for download as part of the open access DAACS database.
