= Edward P. McCabe =

American political leader and attorney (1850–1920)

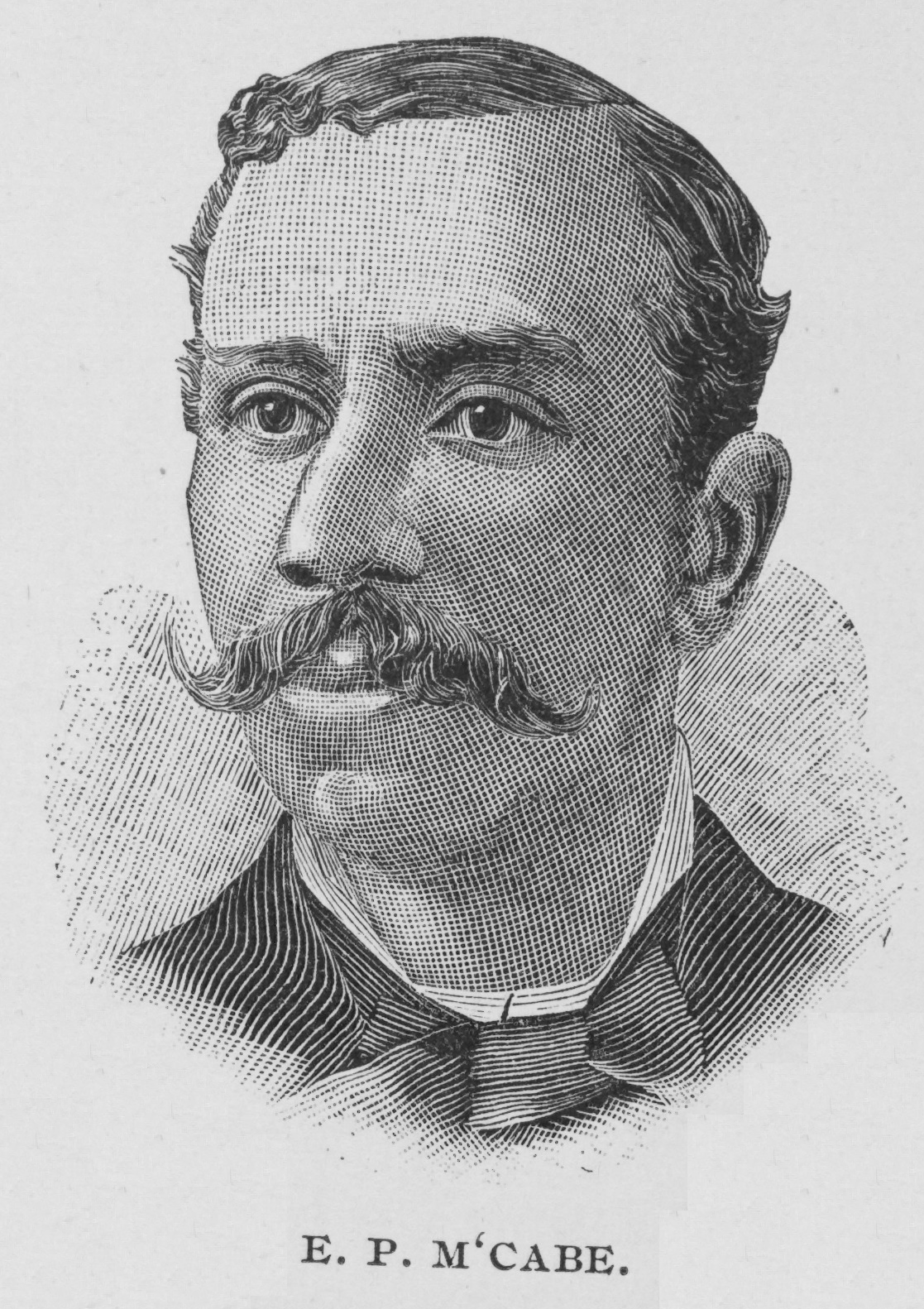
McCabe in 1887

Edward P. McCabe (October 10, 1850 – March 12, 1920), also known as Edwin P. McCabe, was a settler, attorney and land agent who became one of the first African Americans to hold major political office in the American Old West. A Republican office-holder in Kansas, McCabe became a leading figure in an effort to stimulate black migration into what was then the territory of Oklahoma, with the hopes of creating a majority-Black state that would be free of the white domination that was prevalent throughout the Southern United States. In pursuit of this goal, McCabe founded the city of Langston, Oklahoma.

== Early life ==
McCabe was born in Troy, New York, on October 10, 1850. As a child, he moved from Troy to Fall River, Massachusetts, Newport, Rhode Island, and Bangor, Maine. When his father died, he left school and began to work.

Eventually, he moved to New York City, where he worked on Wall Street. Finding no avenues for promotion beyond clerk and porter in New York, he then moved to Chicago in 1872, where he worked as a clerk for Potter Palmer. He was then appointed clerk in the Cook County, Illinois, office of the U.S. Treasury Department.

== Life in Kansas ==
Meanwhile, proposals were already being made at least by 1866 to use the land that is now Oklahoma as a settlement area for African Americans. In that year, U.S. Rep. William Lawrence, an Ohio Republican, introduced a bill creating the Territory of Lincoln from that land. (This is not to be confused with the State of Lincoln proposal made in 1869 for southern Texas, nor the Lincoln proposed for the Pacific Northwest.) Lawrence reintroduced the bill in 1867. The proposal was that all territorial officers and voters would initially be "American citizens of African descent," and the territorial legislature could later choose to change eligibility. Neither bill got out of committee, but the seeds of the idea were planted.

McCabe traveled to Nicodemus, Kansas, in 1878 where he was an attorney and land agent. After two years of residing in Nicodemus he was appointed county clerk of the not long established Graham County, and the next fall he was elected to a full term as county clerk. At age 32, McCabe was elected Kansas State Auditor, and became the highest-ranking African-American officeholder outside of the Reconstruction South (AAME). He served two terms as the state auditor and failed to win a third nomination.

== Life in Oklahoma ==
He then moved to Washington, D.C., where he fruitlessly lobbied for an appointment for governor in the new Oklahoma Territory, from President Benjamin Harrison. Even though he was not appointed, he moved to the Oklahoma Territory in 1890 still looking to make a difference.

He was soon appointed the first Treasurer of Logan County, Oklahoma, and assistant territorial auditor by the Oklahoma territory's first governor, George Washington Steele, who was made governor on May 22, 1890. McCabe supported the idea of making Oklahoma into an all-black state, and wanted to help with the efforts of the idea.

=== Black settlement efforts ===
McCabe was also one of three founders of Langston, Oklahoma. "By 1881, several Negro leaders were planning for the potential resettlement of twenty or thirty thousand freedmen in Oklahoma". McCabe "acquired a 320-acre (1.3 km^{2}) tract near Guthrie, Oklahoma, which became the town of Langston about 1892". The city was an all-black area ten miles northeast of Guthrie. The city was named after John Mercer Langston, a black Virginia Congressman who had pledged his support for a black college in Langston City. Finally in 1897, a Colored Agricultural and Normal School was opened, this was later called Langston University.

The city was founded on the idea to help stop racial persecution. It was part of a program to create more than twenty-five new “black settlements” within the Oklahoma Indian Territory.

McCabe then embarked on an ambitious adventure in state-building, using Langston as a nucleus. He encouraged the immigration of Negroes 'in such numbers that eventually they would outnumber the whites.' In 1892 he went so far as to predict that within a few years Congress would have two Negro senators from Oklahoma. He planned to organize Negro settlers so that he could muster a majority of black voters in each representative and senatorial district of the proposed state".

McCabe had personal ambitions tied into this endeavor, hoping that he would be appointed governor or secretary of the Oklahoma Territory. "The opportunity for progress through prosperity and the chance to escape racial discrimination were the two drawing attractions promoted by Oklahoma black newspapers. The newspapers emphasized one or the other at random in 1905 and 1906." The efforts of McCabe and others "achieved impressive results. The black population of Oklahoma continued to grow until statehood in 1907".

Between 1900 and 1906 the black population at least doubled. "Black Oklahomans owned fairly large farms and even controlled whole towns", and were "behaving in a manner directly contrary to the hopes and expectations of the whites. Past 1900 large numbers of Negroes began moving from the South and East sections to the interior part of the state. They left farming and the Oklahoma coal mines, and took urban service jobs".

Despite these gains, a black majority was not realized in Oklahoma, nor was McCabe able to secure any higher political office. Even though this never happened, McCabe played a big role in taking a stand for African-American rights in a time when there was a great deal of racial persecution.

== Death ==
McCabe died on March 12, 1920, in Chicago, Illinois, and was buried in Topeka, Kansas.

== Sources ==
- Mellilnger, Philip. "Discrimination and Statehood", Chronicles of Oklahoma 49:3 (June 1971) 340-378.
- Taylor, Quintard (2006). "African American History in the West Vignette: Edwin McCabe". University of Washington. Archived from the original on 2006-11-05.
- From Sodom to the Promised Land: E.P. McCabe and the Movement for Oklahoma Colonizaton
- Oklahoma Historical Society biography of Edward P. McCabe
