= Homesteading by African Americans =

African Americans in the United States have a unique history of homesteading, in part due to historical discrimination and legacies of enslavement. Black American communities were negatively impacted by the Homestead Act's implementation, which was designed to give land to those who had been enslaved and other underprivileged groups. The act sought to divide up public lands in five Southern states to black people who were prepared to improve and utilize the land for farming.

== Background ==
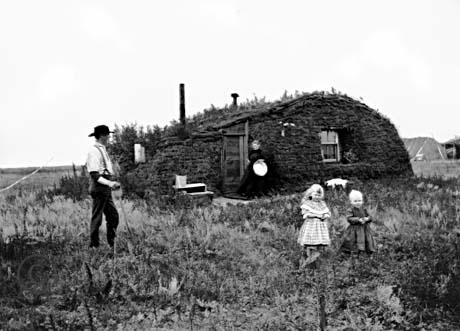
Norwegian settlers in North Dakota, 1898

The Homestead Acts were several laws in the United States by which an applicant could acquire ownership of government land or the public domain, typically called a homestead. In all, more than 160 million acres (650 thousand km^{2}; 250 thousand sq mi) of public land, or nearly 10 percent of the total area of the United States, were given away free to 1.6 million homesteaders; most of the homesteads were west of the Mississippi River.

An extension of the homestead principle in law, the Homestead Acts were an expression of the Free Soil policy of Northerners who wanted individual farmers to own and operate their own farms, as opposed to Southern slave owners who wanted to buy up large tracts of land and use slave labor, thereby shutting out free white farmers.

== Great Plains communities ==
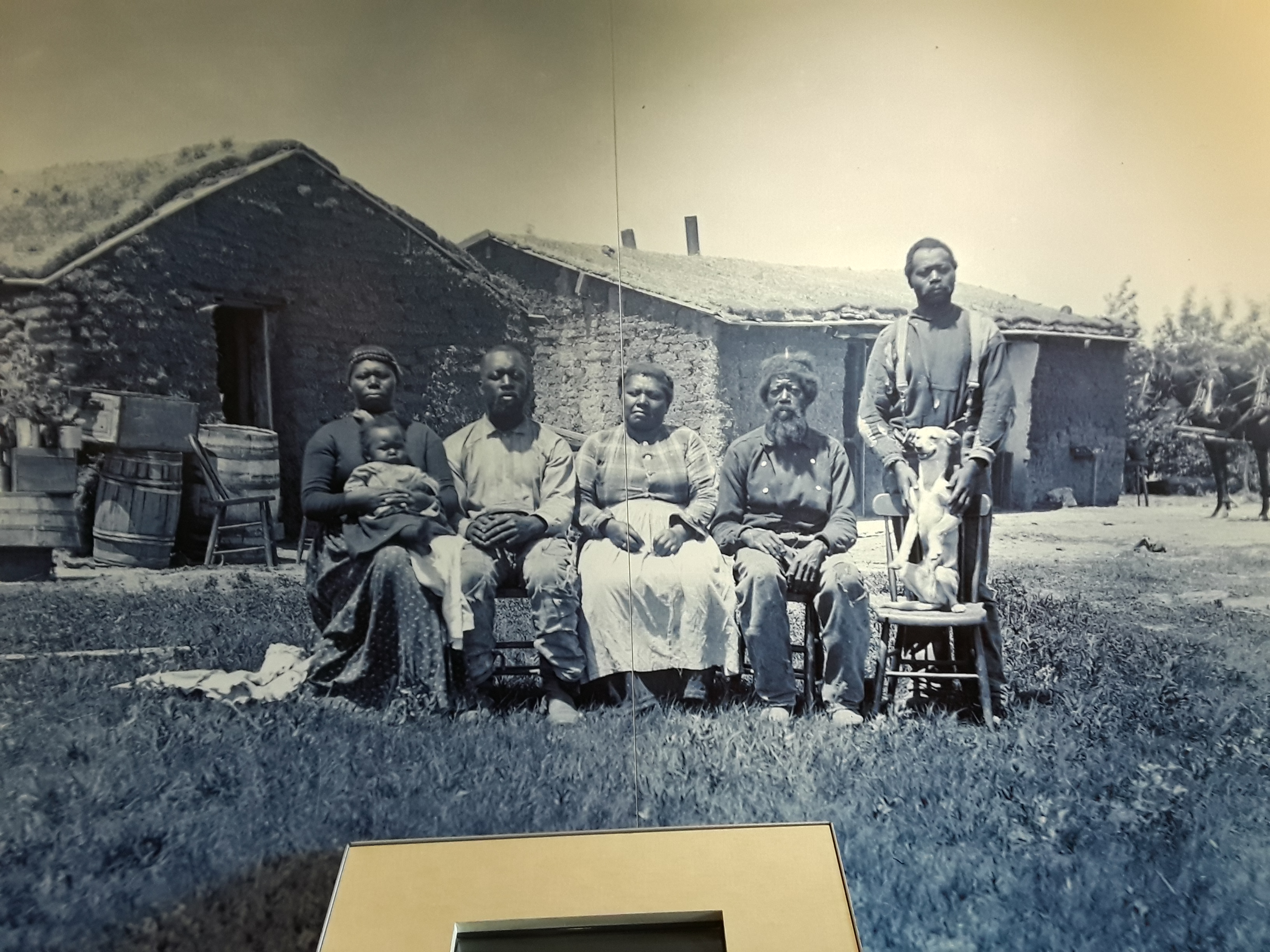
Homestead National Historical Park, Beatrice, Nebraska.

Among the six black homesteading communities in the Great Plains were Blackdom, New Mexico; Nicodemus, Kansas; DeWitty, Nebraska; Sully County, South Dakota; Empire, Wyoming; and Dearfield, Colorado. Black American settlers frequently organized into groups and started these communities by combining their labor and resources to create profitable homesteads. They established churches, schools, and other social organizations to promote unity and belonging.

Despite their tenacity and creativity, African American homesteaders still had to overcome formidable obstacles. In the journal "African American Homesteader “Colonies” in the Settling of the Great Plains", the writers talk about how unfair practices hindered their success, like not being able to get loans or agricultural extension services. Further obstacles to agricultural development were the severe weather of the Great Plains, which included severe winters and drought.

A recent study carried out at the University of Nebraska with funding from the National Park Service provides a detailed account of the number and achievements of black homesteaders in the area.

- An estimated 3,500 black claimants are believed to have been successful in securing their patents, or titles, from the General Property Office, which has allowed them to own some 650,000 acres of prairie property.
- Up to 15,000 individuals, including all family members, called these homesteads home.

=== Dearfield ===
During a period of severe racial prejudice, Black families seeking opportunity and autonomy found sanctuary in the Colorado community of Dearfield. Dearfield prospered for a while, having a church, school, and other businesses, although encountered many obstacles, such as severe weather and financial troubles. Eventually, the town began to collapse, mostly as a result of economic causes like the industrialization of agriculture and the Great Depression.

Elaine Tassy's essay "Dearfield – a Refuge for Black Homesteaders in the 1900s – could become part of the National Park Service" explores plans to preserve the history of Deerfield, including suggestions to include it in the national park system. By granting this status, the town's historical value would be protected and safeguarded for upcoming generations. Author Tassy uses conversations with the town's founding relatives and local historians to give readers a glimpse into Dearfield's colorful past and its lasting significance as a representation of African American resilience and community building in the face of hardship.

== Modern analysis ==
In Richards Edward's journal, "African Americans and the Southern Homestead Act", he contends that the act restricted African Americans' access to land because of fraud, prejudice, and bureaucratic barriers. He emphasizes the difficulties African Americans experienced in obtaining and preserving land, as well as the larger historical background of Reconstruction and African Americans' attempts to establish their rights and autonomy, through archival research and analysis.

Although the goal of the Act was to give land to freed slaves, authors of the research paper "Race and Local Knowledge: New Evidence from the Southern Homestead Act" contend that local knowledge about the quality of the property was a major factor in deciding who was eligible for the program. They discovered that African American settlers were frequently given less attractive, lower-quality land, whereas white settlers tended to obtain the most valuable and bountiful property.
