= William Henry Twine =

African-American lawyer and publisher

- Born: December 10, 1864; Richmond, Kentucky, United States
- Died: October 8, 1933 (aged 68); Muskogee, Oklahoma
- Occupations: Attorney, newspaper publisher
- Notable work: Muskogee Cimeter

William Henry Twine (December 10, 1864 – October 8, 1933) was an African-American lawyer and newspaper publisher who settled in Oklahoma. Twine is noted for having published the Muskogee Cimeter in Muskogee, Oklahoma. He was among the earliest African-American attorneys to practice in modern-day Oklahoma.

== Biography ==
Twine was born in Richmond, Kentucky on December 10, 1864. He was born a freeman. His father, Thomas J. Twine, was a wheelwright and former slave believed to be of mixed Black and Native American ancestry; his mother, Lizzie Twine, was described as a "straight born African".

Twine moved to Texas, where he was admitted to the bar. Twine went on to settle a homestead in Oklahoma, first arriving in the Oklahoma Territory in September 1891.

As an attorney, he defended African American clients, and reportedly slept at the jail on occasion to help deter lynchings. He was the first African-American permitted to practice law in the Indian Territory.

=== Publishing career ===
From 1898 to 1904, he edited the Pioneer Paper in Texas. He published the Muskogee Cimeter from 1904 to 1921. The publication was aligned with the Republican Party and reported on political matters pertaining to the Black community.

Some issues of the Muskogee Cimeter are available on the Library of Congress website.

Twine retired from the publishing industry in 1921, but continued his law practice.

== Personal life and legacy ==
Twine died on October 8, 1933, in Muskogee. He had two sons: Henry Twine and Pliny Twine. The modern town of Taft, Oklahoma was originally named Twine in his honor.
