= Dick Rowland =

African American shoeshiner

Dick Rowland or Roland (born Jimmie Jones and Diamond Dick Rowland in news reports, born c. 1902 – c. 1960s–1979?) was an American teenage shoeshiner whose arrest for assault in May 1921 was the impetus for the Tulsa race massacre. Rowland was 19 years old at the time. The alleged victim of the assault was a white 21-year-old elevator operator Sarah Page (born July 27, 1899). (Note: Reporting contemporaneous with the massacre erroneously reported Page as being 17.) She later declined to advocate for and/or assist any prosecution after the race riots. According to conflicting reports, the arrest was prompted after Rowland tripped in Page's elevator on his way to a segregated bathroom, and a white store clerk reported the incident as an "assault" or a rape.

== Early life ==
Rowland's birth name was Jimmie Jones. It is not known where he was born, but by 1908, he and two sisters were orphans living in Vinita, Oklahoma. Jones was informally adopted by Damie Ford, an African American woman. In approximately 1909, Ford and Jones moved to Tulsa, Oklahoma, to join Ford's family, the Rolands. Eventually, Jones took Roland as his last name, which was later reported as "Rowland". He selected his favorite first name, Dick, as his own. Rowland attended the city's segregated schools, including Booker T. Washington High School.

He dropped out of high school to take a job shining shoes in a white-owned, white-patronized shine parlor on Main Street in downtown Tulsa. As Tulsa was a segregated city where Jim Crow practices were in effect, black people were not allowed to use toilet facilities used by white people. There was no separate facility for blacks at the shine parlor where Rowland worked, and the owner had arranged for black employees to use a segregated "Colored" restroom on the top floor of the nearby Drexel Building at 319 S. Main St.

== Arrest ==
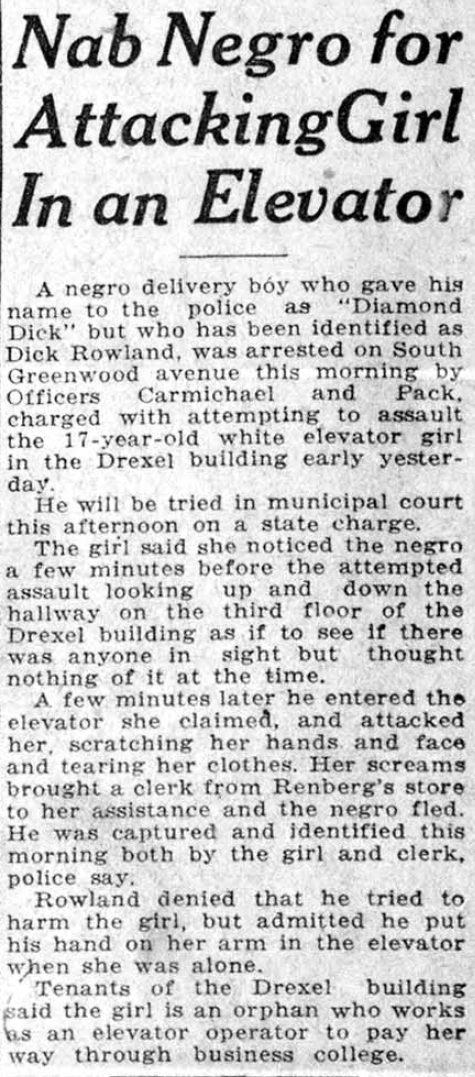
One of the news articles that contributed to tensions in Tulsa

On May 30, 1921, Rowland attempted to enter the Drexel Building elevator. Although the exact facts are in dispute, according to the most accepted accounts, he tripped and, trying to save himself from falling, grabbed the first thing he could, which happened to be the arm of the elevator operator, Sarah Page. Startled, Page screamed, and a white clerk in a first-floor store called police to report seeing Rowland flee from the elevator. The white clerk on the first floor reported the incident as an attempted assault.

Rowland was arrested the following day, though the local police and prosecutors believed him innocent and planned to not charge him. With the headline "Nab Negro for Attacking Girl in an Elevator", that day's issue of the Tulsa Tribune newspaper claimed Rowland had attacked Page and had torn her clothes. A subsequent gathering of angry local whites outside the courthouse where Rowland was being held, and the spread of rumors that he had been lynched, alarmed the local black population, some of whom arrived at the courthouse armed. Shots were fired, and 12 people were killed; 10 white and two black.

The black shooters fled into Greenwood, but were followed by white people bent on retribution. These white Tulsans began a massacre that lasted 16 hours, during which time a white mob started fires and airplanes allegedly dropped firebombs. The destruction included 35 city blocks burned down and 1,256 residences in Tulsa's prosperous African American neighborhood of Greenwood destroyed, resulting in over 800 injuries and 37 confirmed dead — 25 black and 12 white. Later accounts have suggested the number of deaths were under-recorded, and the actual death toll was at least 150.

The case against Dick Rowland was dismissed in September 1921. The dismissal followed the receipt of a letter by the County Attorney from Sarah Page, in which she stated that she did not wish to prosecute the case.

== Subsequent developments ==
Most historians agree that Rowland escaped Tulsa after the massacre. Several reports say that Tulsa Sheriff Willard McCullough took Rowland to Kansas City, although he may have secretly returned to Tulsa in the fall of 1921. Rowland may have been killed in a wharf explosion in Oregon in the 1960s, although his name does not appear on the list of people killed in the explosion. However, a relative said he died c. 1967–1979, and some records say in 1967 he and Sarah Page saw each other in Kansas.

== See also ==
- Steph Simon, Tulsa rapper also known as 'Dicky Ro'
