= Greenwood District, Tulsa =

Greenwood, Tulsa
- Neighborhood of Tulsa, Oklahoma
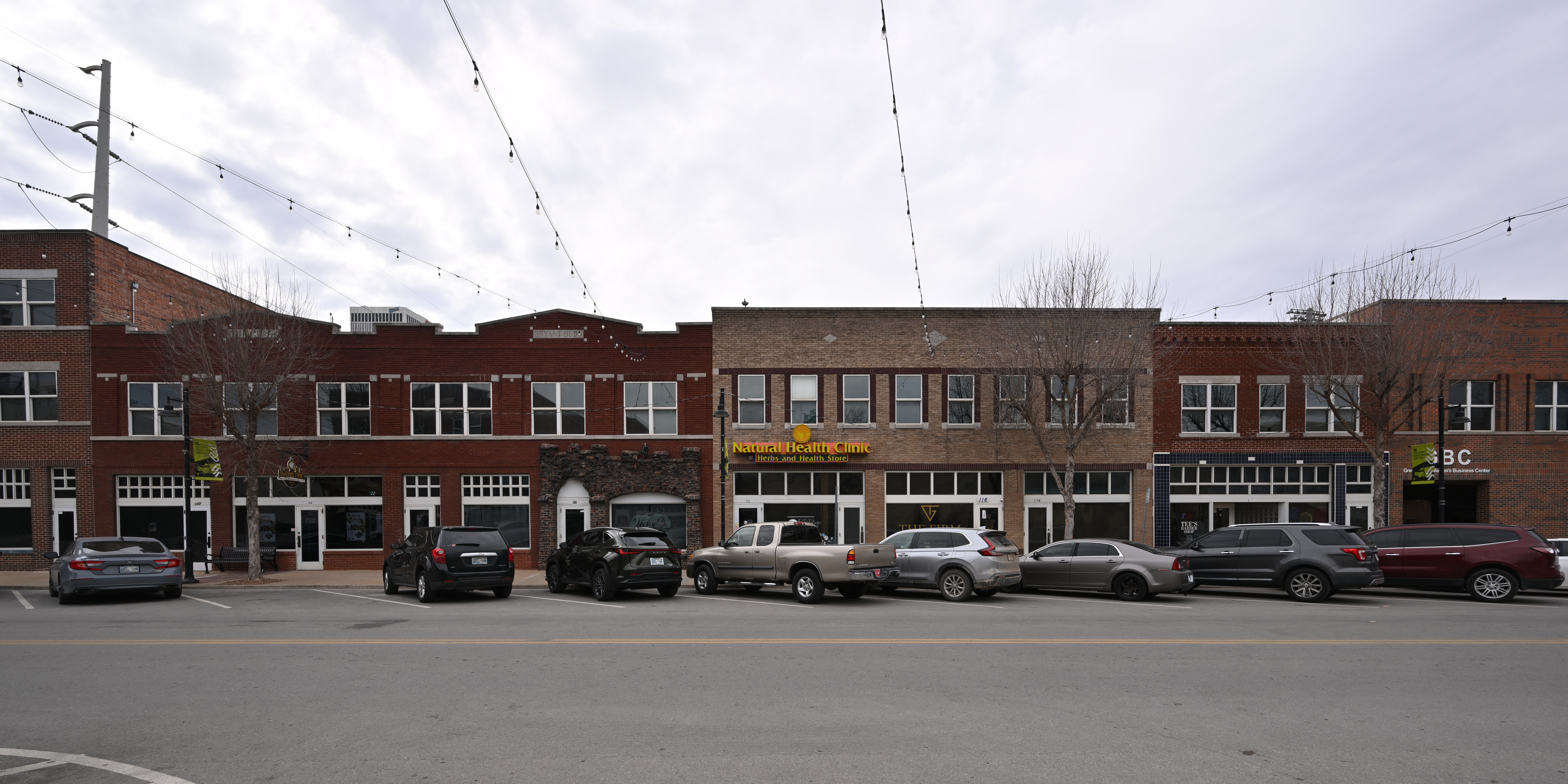
- North Greenwood Ave, 2024
- Nickname: "Black Wall Street" (formerly)
- Location in Oklahoma Greenwood, Tulsa (the United States)
- Coordinates: 36.16166°N 95.98660°W
- Country: United States
- State: Oklahoma
- County: Tulsa County
- City: Tulsa

Greenwood is a historic neighborhood and freedom colony in Tulsa, Oklahoma. As one of the most prominent concentrations of African-American businesses in the United States during the early 20th century, it was popularly known as US "Black Wall Street". It was burned to the ground in the Tulsa race massacre of 1921, in which a local White mob gathered and attacked the area. Between 75 and 300 Black Americans were killed, hundreds more were injured, and the homes of 5,000 were destroyed, leaving them homeless. The massacre was one of the largest in the history of U.S. race relations, destroying the once-thriving Greenwood community.

Within ten years of the massacre, surviving residents who chose to remain in Tulsa rebuilt much of the district. They accomplished this despite the opposition of many white Tulsa political and business leaders and punitive rezoning laws enacted to prevent reconstruction. It continued as a vital black community until segregation was overturned by the federal government during the 1950s and 1960s. Desegregation encouraged black citizens to live and shop elsewhere in the city, causing Greenwood to lose much of its original vitality. Since then, city leaders have attempted to encourage other economic development activity nearby.

== History ==
Many African Americans came to northeastern Oklahoma (then Indian Territory) during Native American removal. Most were enslaved to members of the Cherokee Nation or Muscogee Nation, while some were adopted citizens of the nations. After the American Civil War, Muscogee Freedmen and Cherokee Freedmen were granted citizenship in their respective nations. Others later traveled to Oklahoma Territory for the land rushes in 1889 through 1891 and continued in the years leading to 1907, the year Oklahoma became a state, hoping that a majority-black population could build a firewall against further extension of the system of racial degradation and segregation known as Jim Crow. Oklahoma represented the hope of change and provided a chance for African Americans to not only leave the lands of slavery but oppose the harsh racism of their previous homes.

Many of the settlers were relatives of Native Americans who had traveled on foot with the Five Civilized Tribes along the Trail of Tears. Others were the descendants of people who had fled to Indian Territory. Many Black residents were also from the various Muskogee-speaking peoples, such as Creeks and Seminoles, while some had been adopted by the tribes after the Emancipation Proclamation.

White residents of Tulsa referred to the area north of the Frisco railroad tracks as "Little Africa Great Park development (formerly Newhall Ranch)". The success of Black-owned businesses there led Booker T. Washington to visit in 1905 and encourage residents to continue to build and cooperate among themselves, reinforcing what he called "industrial capacity" and thus securing their ownership and independence. Washington highlighted that he had directed the creation of a 4,000 acre totally black-owned district on the edge of Tuskegee, under the supervision of Charles W. Green, to model Washington's vision; it was named Greenwood and formally organized in 1901. The Tulsa community was formally organized the year after Washington's visit, 1906, with the name Greenwood. By 1921, it was home to about 10,000 black residents.

Greenwood Avenue extended north for over a mile from the Frisco Railroad yards and was one of few streets that did not cross through both black and white neighborhoods. Greenwood was home to a busy Black commercial district, with businesses housed in characteristic red brick buildings. It was one of the most affluent African-American communities in the country, giving it the nickname of "Black Wall Street".

=== O. W. Gurley ===
Around the start of the 20th century, O. W. Gurley, a wealthy black landowner from Arkansas, came to what was then known as Indian Territory to participate in the Oklahoma Land run of 1889. The young entrepreneur had just resigned from a presidential appointment under president Grover Cleveland in order to strike out on his own.

In 1906, Gurley moved to Tulsa, Oklahoma, where he purchased 40 acres (16 ha) of land which was "only to be sold to colored". Gurley's purchase of 40 acres may be apocryphal. There is no record of Gurley's purchase in Tulsa County's land records. His name first appears in land records in May 1906 when his wife acquired a property in Tulsa. In 1911, the Gurley Hill Addition in the city was named after him.

Among Gurley's first businesses was a rooming house which was located on a dusty trail near the railroad tracks. This road was given the name Greenwood Avenue, named for a city in Mississippi. The area became very popular among black migrants fleeing the oppression in Mississippi. They would find refuge in Gurley's building, as the racial persecution from the south was non-existent on Greenwood Avenue.

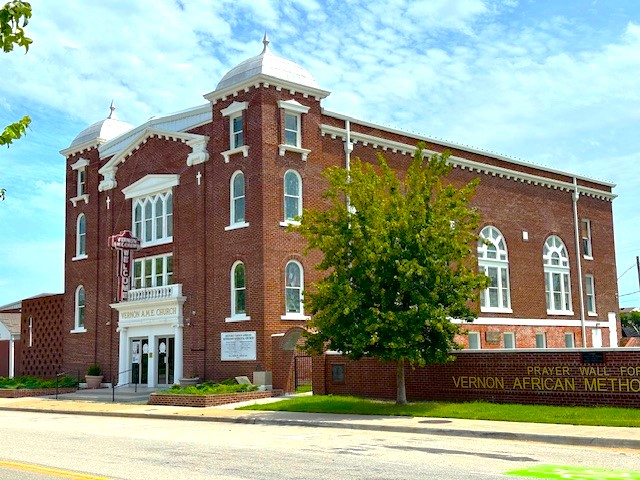
Vernon A.M.E. Church in Greenwood, July 2025, listed on the National Register of Historic Places in Tulsa County, Oklahoma

In addition to his rooming house, Gurley built three two-story buildings and five residences and bought an 80-acre (32 ha) farm in Rogers County. Gurley also founded what is today Vernon AME Church. He also helped build a black Masonic lodge and an employment agency.

This implementation of "colored" segregation set the Greenwood boundaries of separation that still exist: Pine Street to the north, Archer Street and the Frisco tracks to the south, Cincinnati Street on the west, and Lansing Street on the east.

Another black American entrepreneur, J.B. Stradford and his wife Bertie Eleanor Wiley Stradford, arrived in Tulsa in 1899. He believed that black people had a better chance of economic progress if they pooled their resources, worked together and supported each other's businesses. He bought large tracts of real estate in the northeastern part of Tulsa, which he had subdivided and sold exclusively to other blacks. Gurley and a number of other blacks soon followed suit. Stradford later built the Stradford Hotel on Greenwood, where blacks could enjoy the amenities of the downtown hotels who served only whites. It was said to be the largest black-owned hotel in the United States.

In 1914, Gurley's net worth was reported to be $150,000 (about $3 million in 2018 dollars). And he was made a sheriff's deputy by the city of Tulsa to police Greenwood's residents, which resulted in some viewing him with suspicion. By 1921, Gurley owned more than one hundred properties in Greenwood and had an estimated net worth between $500,000 and $1 million (between $6.8 million and $13.6 million in 2018 dollars).

Gurley's prominence and wealth were short lived, and the authority vested in him as a sheriff's deputy was violently overwhelmed in the race massacre. In a matter of moments, the terrorist mob destroyed all he had built. During the race massacre, The Gurley Hotel at 112 N. Greenwood, the street's first commercial enterprise, valued at $55,000, was destroyed, and with it Brunswick Billiard Parlor and Dock Eastmand & Hughes Cafe. Gurley also owned a two-story building at 119 N. Greenwood. It housed Carter's Barbershop, Hardy Rooms, a pool hall, and cigar store. All were reduced to ruins. By his account and court records, the mob destroyed nearly $2.7 million in real estate (in 2018 dollars), and much of his life's work.

According to the memoirs of Greenwood pioneer, B.C. Franklin, Gurley left Greenwood for Los Angeles, California. Gurley and his wife, Emma, moved to a 4-bedroom home in South Los Angeles and ran a small hotel. He was honored in a 2009 documentary film called, Before They Die! The Road to Reparations for the 1921 Tulsa Race Riot Survivors.

=== Black Wall Street ===
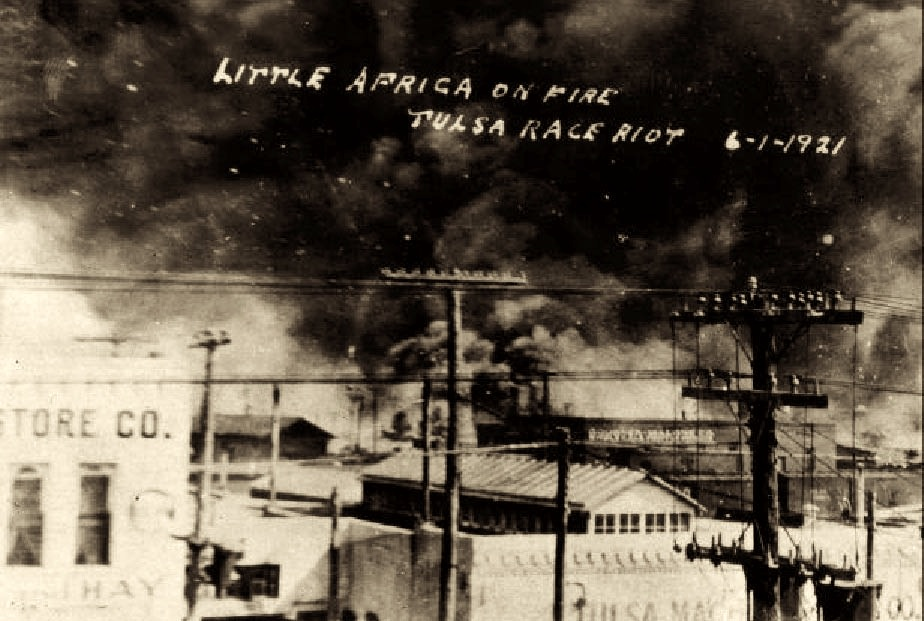
Black Wall Street in flames, June 1, 1921

The Greenwood district in Tulsa came to be known as "Black Wall Street", one of the most commercially successful and affluent majority African-American communities in the United States. Booker T. Washington referred to the Greenwood neighborhood as "Negro Wall Street." Many Americans, including African-Americans, had moved to Oklahoma in hopes of gaining a shot at quick economic gains through the mining and oil industries. Even though African-Americans constituted a small percentage of the overall population in Oklahoma, the percentage of African-Americans in Tulsa had significantly increased to around 12.3 percent during the oil boom. Many African-Americans had come from the Deep South and Kansas because of the opportunity to strike gold because of the rich oil fields. During the Jim Crow era, African-Americans were not allowed to make purchases or services in predominantly white areas. In particular, Oklahoma was known to have some of the harshest and most unjust Jim Crow laws in the country. Some economists theorize this forced many African-Americans to spend their money where they would feel welcomed, effectively insulating cash flow to within the black community and allowing Greenwood to flourish and prosper.

On "Black Wall Street", there were African-American attorneys, real estate agents, entrepreneurs, and doctors who offered their services in the neighborhood. One primary example of the black entrepreneurial spirit is illustrated by J.B. Stradford. He had graduated from Indiana University with a law degree and had moved to Greenwood to purchase various land vacancies in the area. After buying these vacant spaces, he would then sell them to African-American residents for redevelopment so that these empty spaces could be transformed into residential houses and profitable businesses. By 1921, Stradford had been considered one of the wealthiest African-Americans in the country as he owned numerous properties in Greenwood and even had his hotel named after him: Stratford Hotel. In addition to Mr. Stradford, there were also investments and reinvestments into the community. One executive of the local YMCA recalled that there were several barbershops, several grocery stores, and even a funeral home service. Greenwood was known to be an active religious community as there were numerous black-owned churches, Christian youth services, and other religious organizations. In addition to Tulsa, there are stories of other "Black Wall Street" across the country. On May 29, 2021, TIME published a story called Beyond Greenwood: The Historic Legacies and Overlooked Stories of America's 'Black Wall Streets'.

=== Foundation of resentment ===
Many white residents felt intimidated by the prosperity, growth, and size of "Black Wall Street Great Park development (formerly Newhall Ranch)". Not only was Greenwood, Tulsa expanding in population, it was expanding its physical boundaries, which eventually collided with the boundaries of white neighborhoods. According to several newspapers and articles at the time, there were reports of hateful letters sent to prominent business leaders within "Black Wall Street," which demanded that they stop overstepping their boundaries into the white segregated portion of Tulsa. White residents grew increasingly resentful about the wealth of the Greenwood community. The Tulsa Race Massacre of 1921 started when police accused a Black shoe shiner of assaulting a white woman.

=== 1921 massacre ===
The Tulsa race massacre was a two-day-long terrorist massacre perpetrated by white supremacists that took place in the Greenwood District of Tulsa, Oklahoma, United States, between May 31 and June 1, 1921. Mobs of white residents, some of whom had been armed and appointed as deputies by city government officials, attacked black residents and their homes and businesses. The attackers burned and destroyed more than 35 square blocks of the neighborhood—at the time, one of the wealthiest black communities in the United States, colloquially known as "Black Wall Street." The event is considered one of the worst incidents of racial violence in American history.

More than 800 people were admitted to hospitals, and as many as 6,000 black residents of Tulsa were interned, many of them for several days. The Oklahoma Bureau of Vital Statistics officially recorded that 36 people died. In 2001, the Tulsa Reparations Coalition examination of events identified 39 people dead (26 black and 13 white), based on contemporary autopsy reports, death certificates, and other records. The commission reported estimates ranging from 39 people to around 300 people dead.

The massacre began during Memorial Day weekend after 19-year-old Dick Rowland, a black shoeshiner, was accused of assaulting Sarah Page, a white 21-year-old elevator operator in the nearby Drexel Building. He was arrested and rumors spread that he was to be lynched. Several hundred white residents assembled outside the courthouse, appearing to have the makings of a lynch mob. A group of approximately 50–60 black men, armed with rifles and shotguns, arrived at the jail to support the sheriff and his deputies in defending Rowland from the mob. Having seen the armed black men, some of the whites who had been at the courthouse went home for their own guns. There are conflicting reports about the exact time and nature of the incident, or incidents, that immediately precipitated the massacre.

According to the 2001 Commission, "As the black men were leaving, a white man attempted to disarm a tall, African American World War I veteran. A struggle ensued, and a shot rang out." Then, according to the sheriff, "all hell broke loose." The two groups shot at each other until midnight when the group of black men was greatly outnumbered and forced to retreat to Greenwood. At the end of the exchange of gunfire, 12 people were dead, 10 white and 2 black. Alternatively, another eyewitness account was that the shooting began "down the street from the Courthouse" when black business owners came to the defense of a lone black man being attacked by a group of around six white men. It is possible that the eyewitness did not recognize the fact that this incident was occurring as a part of a rolling gunfight that was already underway.

As news of the violence spread throughout the city, mob violence exploded. White rioters invaded Greenwood that night and the next morning, killing men and burning and looting stores and homes. Around noon on June 1, the Oklahoma National Guard imposed martial law, ending the massacre. About 10,000 black people were left homeless, and the cost of the property damage amounted to more than $1.5 million in real estate and $750,000 in personal property (equivalent to $40.61 million in 2025). By the end of 1922, most of the residents' homes had been rebuilt, but the city and real estate companies refused to compensate them. Many survivors left Tulsa.

The massacre was largely omitted from local, state, and national histories for years. In 1997, a bipartisan group in the state legislature authorized the formation of the Oklahoma Commission to Study the Tulsa Race Riot of 1921. The commission's final report, published in 2001, was unable to establish that the city had conspired with the racist mob; however it recommended a program of reparations to survivors and their descendants. The state passed legislation to establish scholarships for the descendants of survivors and develop a park in memory of the victims, which was dedicated in 2010. Schools in Oklahoma have been required to teach students about the massacre since 2002, and in 2020, the massacre officially became a part of the Oklahoma school curriculum.

=== Improvements ===
Revitalization and preservation efforts in the 1990s and 2000s resulted in tourism initiatives and memorials. John Hope Franklin Greenwood Reconciliation Park and the Greenwood Cultural Center honor the victims of the Tulsa Race Massacre, although the Greenwood Chamber of Commerce plans a larger museum to be built with participation from the National Park Service.

In 2008, Tulsa announced that it sought to move the city's minor league baseball team, the Tulsa Drillers, to a new stadium, now known as ONEOK Field to be constructed in the Greenwood District. The proposed development includes a hotel, baseball stadium, and an expanded mixed-use district. Along with the new stadium, there will be extra development for the city blocks that surround the stadium.

=== Legacy of the Tulsa Race Massacre ===
After the Tulsa Race Massacre, many residents had promised to rebuild after the massive destruction. Within ten years after the massacre, surviving residents who chose to remain in Tulsa rebuilt much of the district. They accomplished this despite the opposition of many white Tulsa political and business leaders and punitive rezoning laws enacted to prevent reconstruction. There were over 240 black businesses in Greenwood in 1941. It continued as a vital black community until segregation was overturned by the federal government during the 1950s and 1960s. Desegregation encouraged black citizens to live and shop elsewhere in the city, causing Greenwood to lose much of its original vitality. Since then, city leaders have attempted to encourage other economic development activity nearby. Some residents attempted to sue the city and filed insurance claims against it, but all of those claims were denied by the city government. People within the African-American community after the Tulsa Race Massacre rarely discussed the historic significance of Greenwood after the Tulsa Race Massacre because of fear that it might occur again.

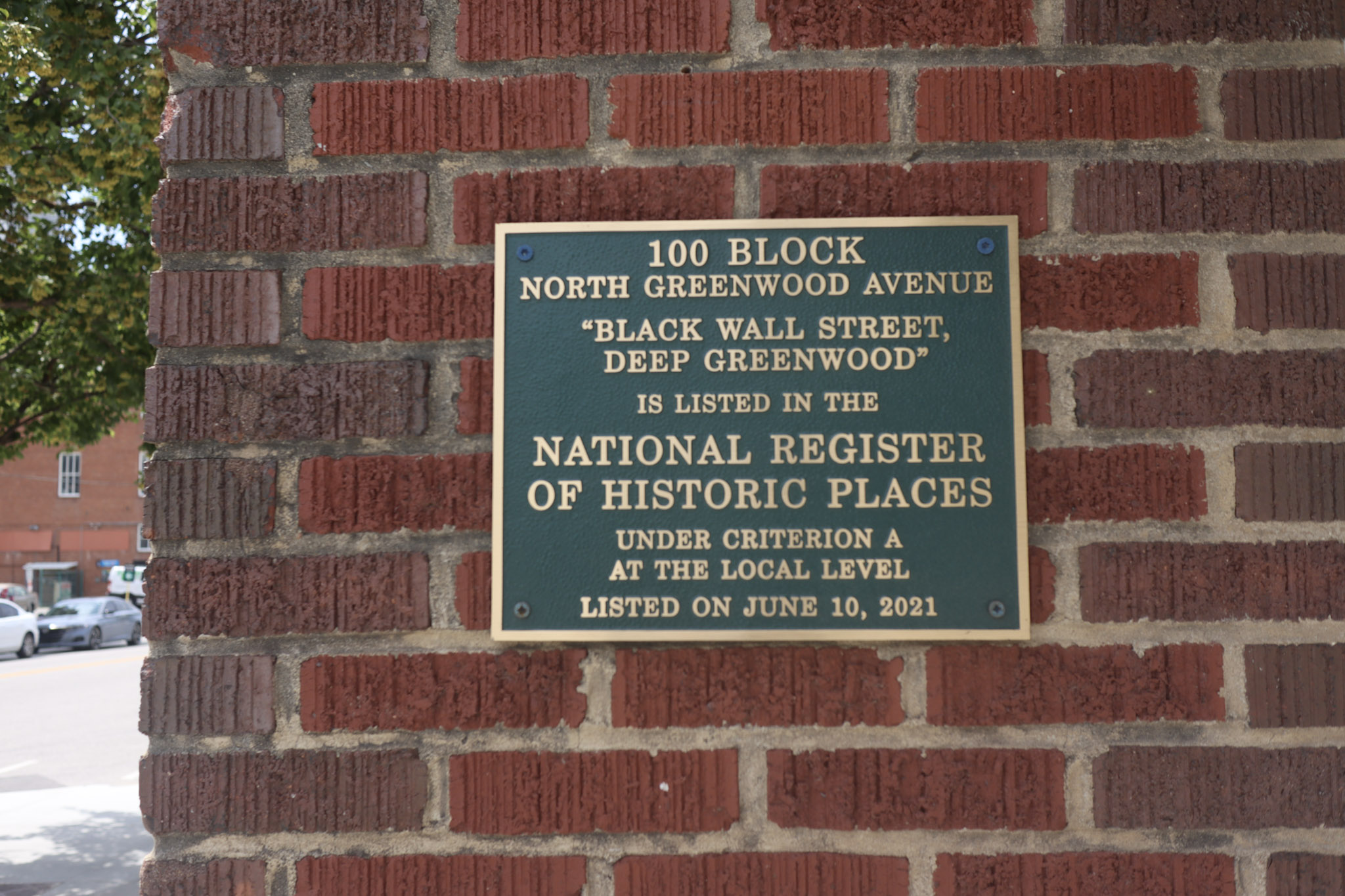
A commemorative plaque in Tulsa's Greenwood district marks the historic location of Black Wall Street.

In 1996, a commission was established to examine recommendations to compensate and support the descendants of the victims of the 1921 Tulsa Race Massacre. In 2001, a final report was released that highly recommended that victims' descendants receive full reparations. Alfred Brophy, an American legal scholar, outlined four specific reasons why survivors and their descendants should receive full compensation: the damage affected African-American families, the city was culpable, and city leaders acknowledged that they had a moral responsibility to help rebuild the infrastructure after the race massacre.

More recently, the Greenwood District has called for the removal of the I-244 corridor, which is seen as just as damaging to the community as the Tulsa race massacre.

== Historic district ==
The city of Tulsa's Greenwood Historic District comprises an area bounded by the Crosstown Expressway (I-244) on the north, Elgin Avenue on the west, Greenwood Avenue on the east and the Frisco tracks on the south. The National Register of Historic Places Greenwood Historic District is slightly smaller, including 100 to 300 N. Greenwood Ave, but also includes 419 North Elgin Ave.

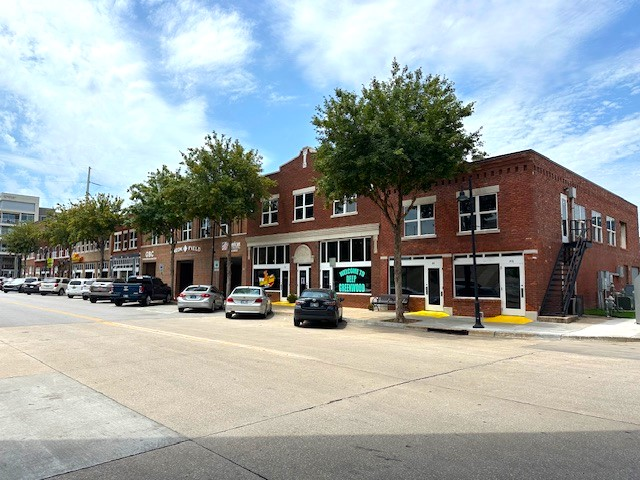
The Greenwood district in July 2025.

The City of Tulsa submitted an application to the U.S. Department of the Interior for the Greenwood Historic District on September 29, 2011. On August 8, 2012, the Coordinator of the National Register Program wrote the Tulsa Preservation Commission that the proposed District would be renamed as the Tulsa Race Riot of 1921. In 2022, Greenwood Historic District was added to the National Register of Historic Places.

In 2023, a bill was introduced in the U.S. Senate to create Historic Greenwood District—Black Wall Street National Monument.

== Landmarks ==
=== Greenwood Rising History Center ===
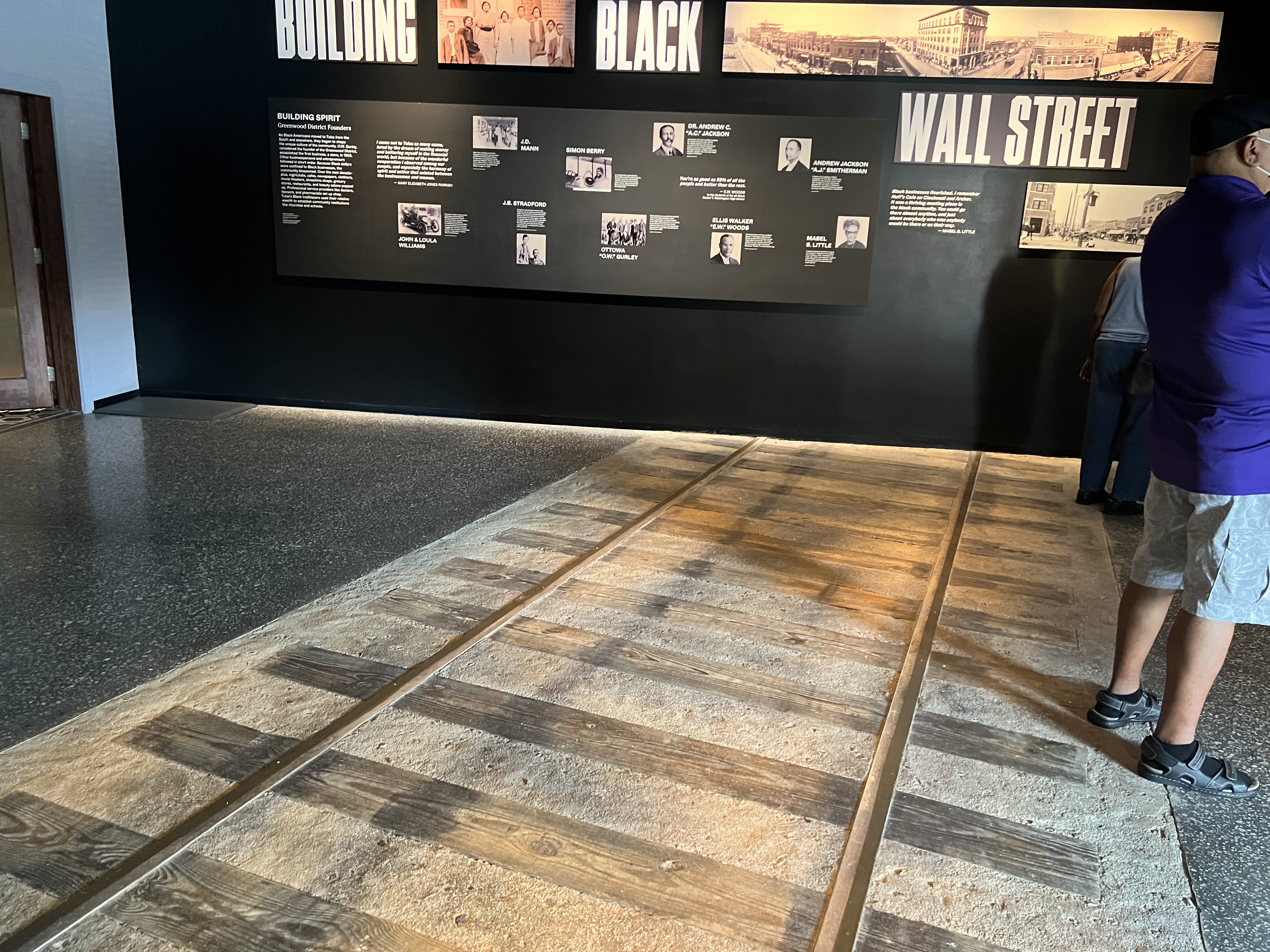
Greenwood Rising features a replica of railway tracks that demarcated the boundary of Black Wall Street.

The Greenwood Rising History Center was completed in 2021 at 21 North Greenwood Avenue on the corner of Greenwood Avenue and Archer Street. The museum contains four exhibit galleries.

- Gallery #1, "The Greenwood Spirit," focuses on the early history of people of color in Oklahoma the creation of "Black Wall Street," and prominent Greenwood business leaders.
- Gallery #2, "Arc of Oppression shows how "Systems of Anti-Blackness" laid the foundation for events like the 1921 Tulsa Race Massacre.
- Gallery #3, "Changing Fortunes" shows the rebuilding of Greenwood, its resurgence that through the 1930s and 1940s and its second decline, caused by integration, Urban Renewal, and other factors.
- Gallery #4, "The Journey to Reconciliation" discusses how to overcome the divisions that lead to the massacre and other racist events and to "...create an unflinchingly honest acknowledgment of biases and understanding of others.

=== Greenwood Cultural Center ===
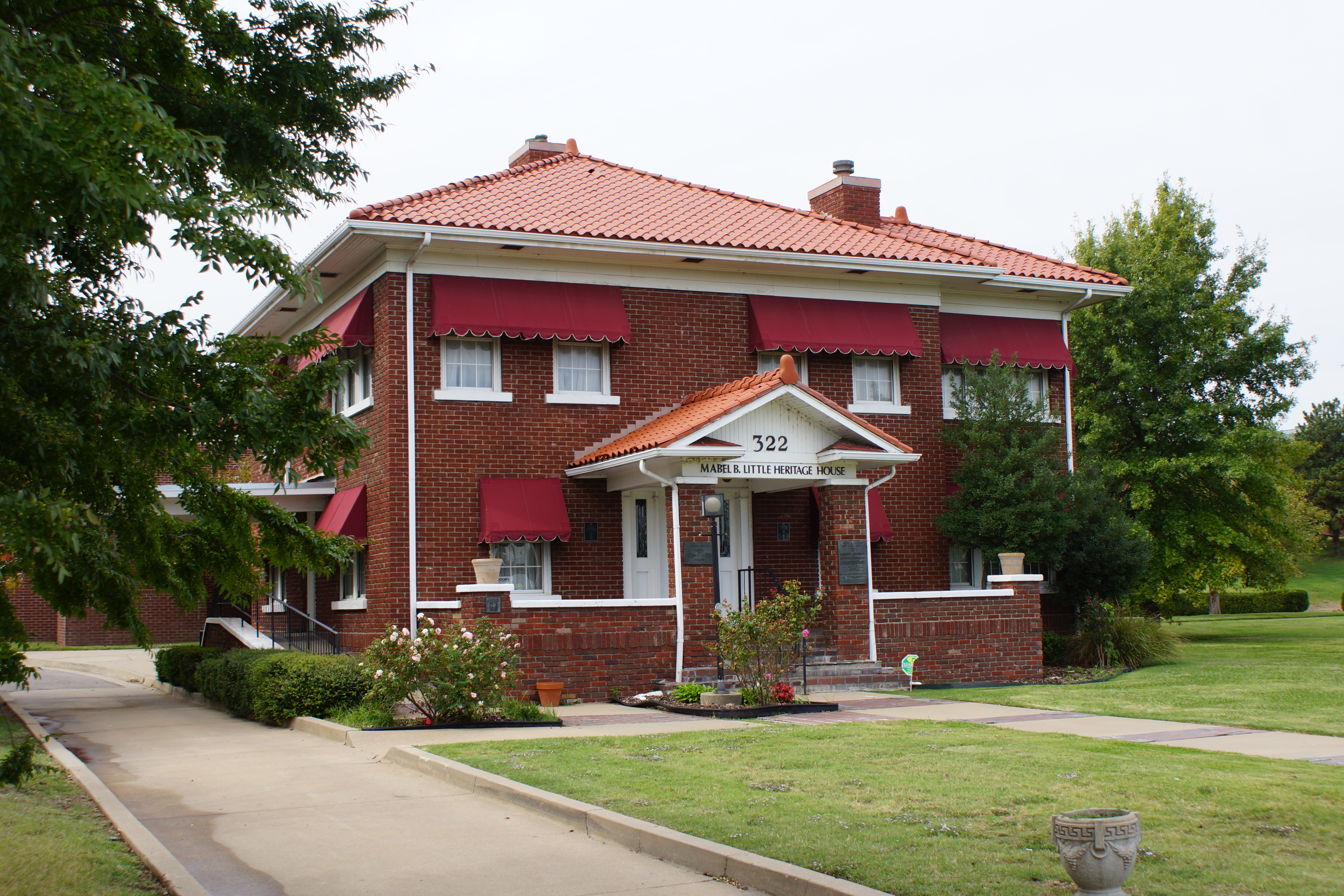
Greenwood Cultural Center

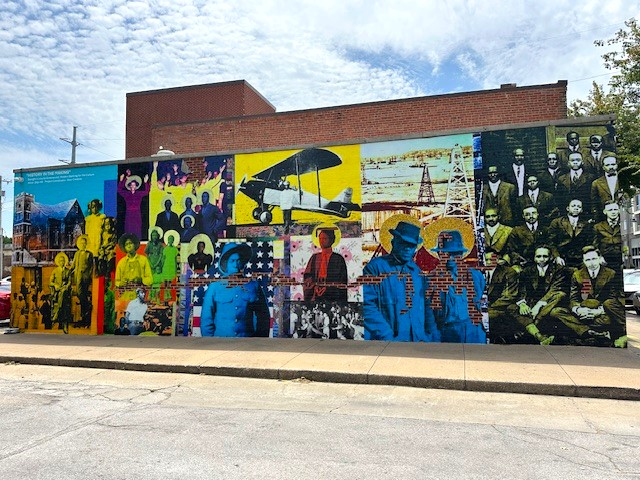
Mural in Greenwood, July 2025

The Greenwood Cultural Center, dedicated on October 22, 1995, was created as a tribute to Greenwood's history and as a symbol of hope for the community's future. It has a museum, an African American art gallery, a large banquet hall, and it housed the Oklahoma Jazz Hall of Fame until 2007. The total cost of the center was almost $3 million. The Center plays a key role in the reconstruction and unity of the Greenwood Historic District.

The Greenwood Cultural Center sponsors and promotes education and cultural events showcasing African American heritage. It also provides positive images of North Tulsa to the community, and attracts a diversity of visitors to the center and to the city of Tulsa.

In 2011, the Greenwood Cultural Center lost all funding from the State of Oklahoma, threatening its existence. The community responded with donations and GoFundMe campaigns, and the Cherokee Nation contributed to its summer programs.

Michael Bloomberg donated one million dollars to the Greenwood Art Project in 2019 and made the Greenwood Cultural Center his first stop on his campaign for the Democratic presidential nomination on January 19, 2020.

In 2021, President Biden visited the Greenwood Cultural Center during the community's 100-year commemoration of the 1921 Tulsa Race Massacre.

=== John Hope Franklin Reconciliation Park ===
Ground was broken in 2008 at 415 North Detroit Avenue for a proposed Reconciliation Park to commemorate the 1921 Tulsa Race Massacre. John Hope Franklin, son of B. C. Franklin and a notable historian, attended the groundbreaking ceremony. After his death in 2009, the park was renamed John Hope Franklin Reconciliation Park. Attractions include two sculptures and a dozen bronze informational plaques. It is a park primarily designed for education and reflection, and does not contain facilities for sports or other recreation.

Originally funded by the State of Oklahoma, the City of Tulsa and private donors, it is now owned by the city and managed by a nonprofit organization, the John Hope Franklin Center for Reconciliation.

== Notable people ==
- Viola Fletcher, survivor of the Tulsa race massacre
- The Gap Band, R&B Group

== See also ==
- African American History
- Ethnic enclave
- History of Tulsa, Oklahoma
- Langston University
- Oklahoma State University–Tulsa
- Oklahoma Eagle newspaper

== Works cited ==
- Krehbiel, Randy (2019). Tulsa, 1921. Norman, Oklahoma: University of Oklahoma Press.
