= Eugene Lorton =

American editor and publisher (1869–1949)

- Born: Eugene Lorton; May 28, 1869; Middletown, Missouri, United States
- Died: November 17, 1949 (aged 80); Tulsa, Oklahoma, United States
- Occupation: Newspaper publisher
- Known for: Owner of Tulsa World
- Political party: Republican Party (before 1932; after 1940)
- Other political affiliations: Democratic Party (1932-1940)

Eugene Lorton (May 28, 1869 – October 17, 1949) was the long-time editor and publisher of the Tulsa World newspaper. Born in Missouri, he moved to Tulsa in 1911, where he bought a minority interest in the Tulsa World. Within six years, he owned the newspaper outright. He spent the rest of his life in Tulsa.

== Early life ==
Eugene Lorton was born on a farm in Montgomery County, Missouri, near Middletown on May 28, 1869. His father, R. R. Lorton, was a farmer and stock raiser who also worked on farms in Kansas and Texas. In his youth, Eugene attended public schools in Missouri and Kansas, before starting work as a printer's apprentice in Medicine Lodge, Kansas. He worked briefly for a railroad, until he was injured in an accident in Kansas City, and returned to the newspaper business.

== Career ==
After recovering from the train accident, Eugene Lorton moved to Idaho Territory, where he returned to the newspaper business. He published weekly papers in Salubria, Emmett and Boise. In 1896, he moved back to Kansas and bought the Linn County Republic in Mound City, Kansas. He became active in politics and was elected mayor of Mound City.

In 1900, he moved to Walla Walla, Washington where he became managing editor of the Walla Walla Daily Union and founded the Walla Walla Daily Bulletin. He also raised his political activity by becoming campaign manager for Governor Cosgrove. When Cosgrove was elected, he appointed Lorton as the chairman of the state board of control.

== Tulsa World ==
The Tulsa World had been founded in 1905, and had been owned by Missouri mine owner, George Bayne and his brother-in-law Charles Dent. They also served as editors, after firing the previous editor in 1906, following a financial scandal. Its major competitor was the Morning News, owned by local businessman, Charles Page. Lorton found an opportunity to become editor of, and purchase a one-third interest in, the Tulsa World in 1911, which he increased to one-half interest in 1913, by buying out Bayne's share. By 1917, Lorton, with financial backing of oilman and banker, Harry Sinclair, owned the Tulsa World outright. In 1919, Page sold his paper to Richard Lloyd Jones, who renamed it as the Tulsa Tribune.

Tulsa's quest for a satisfactory water supply in the early 1900s soon developed into an acrimonious political fight and a personal feud between Lorton and Page.

=== Oklahoma politics ===
Lorton was active in the Republican party for most of his career. He immediately resumed his activities in Republican party politics after moving to Oklahoma. He was named a member of the finance committee of the Republican National Committee in 1916. However, he became known as a "maverick" after he moved to Oklahoma. He continually supported campaign finance reform and strongly opposed the Ku Klux Klan. More conservative opponents in the party called him the "Republican Bryan." Democratic Oklahoma Governor E. W. Marland said that, "...Gene Marland runs a "propaganda sheet."

According to the Encyclopedia of Oklahoma History and Culture, Lorton presented as pro-organized labor. Media studies professor Russell Cobb noted Lorton was adamantly anti-Industrial Workers of the World and opposed "social equity" for Black Americans. Lorton also supported tariffs and the deportation of foreign citizens "who refused to be Americanized."

Lorton ran in the Republican primary of 1924 to be the nominee for U. S. Senator from Oklahoma, but William B. Pine defeated him soundly. In 1928, Lorton publicly supported the Democratic nominee for President, Alfred E. Smith. He transferred his political loyalty to the Democratic Party in 1932, but this turned out to be only temporary. He returned to the Republican Party in 1940, and remained a member for the rest of his life.

== Death ==
Eugene Lorton died in Tulsa of a heart ailment on October 17, 1949. His widow, Maud, died in 1962.
