= William P. Steven =

American newspaper executive

- Born: William Pickford Steven; September 10, 1908; Eau Claire, Wisconsin
- Died: August 6, 1991 (aged 82); Sarasota, Florida
- Other name: Bill Steven
- Education: University of Wisconsin (Journalism)
- Occupation: Newspaper executive
- Years active: 1930 - 1991
- Spouse: Esther Lucile "Lucy" Shoemaker

William Pickford Steven (September 10, 1908 – August 6, 1991) was a noted American newspaper executive. A native of Eau Claire, Wisconsin, he graduated from the University of Wisconsin at Madison (UW-M) with a degree in journalism. In 1930, he became a reporter for the Tulsa Tribune, where he was promoted to managing editor in 1937. During World War II, he moved to Washington, D.C., and worked in the press division of the Office of Censorship. After the War, he joined the Minneapolis Star-Tribune as managing editor. He was later appointed executive editor and vice president. In 1961, he became editor of the Houston Chronicle. After leaving Houston, he became vice president and editorial director of the World Book Encyclopedia Science Service and vice president of The Chicago Daily News and Sun-Times. Steven retired to Sarasota, Florida, where he and his wife lived until his death on August 6, 1991.

== Early life ==
Bill Steven was born September 10, 1908, in Eau Claire, Wisconsin. His father, J.D.R. Steven, was born in Scotland and emigrated to the United States from Canada. His mother, Merle Pickford, was a Wisconsin native. According to an obituary, Bill showed a strong interest in journalism by publishing his own neighborhood newspaper when he was only eight years old. He was selected as editor of the first edition of the Eau Claire high school newspaper in 1926. Although he was legally old enough to graduate from high school (age 14), UW-M would not accept his application because of his age. So, he remained in high school for an extra year, during which he founded The High School News. He enrolled in the University of Wisconsin, where he worked on the school newspaper, served as editor of the Daily Cardinal during his senior year and graduated with a degree in journalism.

== Professional career ==
=== Tulsa Tribune ===
After graduating from UW-M in 1930, Steven moved to Tulsa, Oklahoma, where he started with the Tulsa Tribune as a cub reporter. The Tribune was owned and published by Richard Lloyd Jones, who was also a native of Wisconsin and son of crusading Unitarian minister, Jenkin Lloyd Jones. Steven continued to hone his journalistic skills and was named city editor by 1936 and managing editor of the paper by 1937.

It is difficult to tell how Steven may have influenced the Tribune, or how the experience may have influenced him. Almost nothing has appeared in print. In retrospect, his tenure seems like an odd pairing. Richard Lloyd Jones was politically ultra conservative and his views dominated the content of the Tribune. Probably he delegated little or no authority to the younger man, who later would prove to be a dynamic and unapologetic progressive in his political and social views. The Atlantic Monthly labeled him as a "moderate Republican".

=== Office of Censorship ===
With little fanfare, the Steven family moved to Washington, D.C. Bill had been named assistant director of the Press Division of the Office of Censorship. In effect, he was responsible for reviewing all articles about the war effort to determine whether the content would reveal too much information to the enemy. The actual work was classified.

=== Minneapolis ===
John T. Cowles, Sr., owner of the Minneapolis Star and Minneapolis Tribune hired Steven as managing editor for the two papers in 1944. Cowles and Steven soon developed a good working relationship. He was named vice president and executive editor in 1954. During his tenure in Minneapolis, he served one term as president of the Associated Press Managing Editors Association in 1949 and became first chairman of the organization's Continuing Studies Committee.

Noted columnist, Carl T. Rowan began his journalism career in 1948, reporting to Steven. In a moving tribute after Steven's death, he recalled that Bill had asked him to write a series about small towns in the Upper Midwest that were dying because bankers and powerful families were fighting against the intrusions of new industries. The head of the most powerful banking chain in the area called Steven to complain about the article. Steven replied that the banker knew the facts were true. According to Rowan, the banker told him ten years later that the article was true and that Steven's reply made the banker proud of the Tribune.

By August 1960, John Cowles, Jr. had been named vice president and associate editor of the two papers. It was soon apparent that he disapproved of Steven's hard-nosed approach to journalism. He told Steven that he would be the person clearing Steven's orders. When Steven balked, the younger Cowles fired him.

=== Houston Chronicle ===
In 1926, Jesse H. Jones became the sole owner of the Houston Chronicle. In 1937, he transferred ownership of the paper to the newly established Houston Endowment Inc. Jones retained the title of publisher until his death in 1956. The Houston Endowment board then named John T. Jones, nephew of Jesse H. Jones, as editor of the Chronicle. Houston Endowment president, J. Howard Creekmore, was named publisher. In effect, John Jones was the hands-on boss of the newspaper, while Creekmore, as president of the Houston Endowment board, was Jones' boss.

According to the Handbook of Texas Online," the paper generally represented very conservative political views during the 1950s:

"...the Chronicle generally represented the very conservative political interests of the Houston business establishment. As such, it eschewed controversial political topics, such as integration or the impacts of rapid economic growth on life in the city. It did not perform investigative journalism. This resulted in a stodgy newspaper that failed to capture the interests of newcomers to the city. By 1959, circulation of the rival Houston Post had pulled ahead of the Chronicle." The Atlantic Monthly reported that in 1959, the rival Houston Post had 218,000 subscribers, while the Houston Chronicle had 205,000.

In 1961, John T. Jones hired Steven as editor, in hopes that he would turn around the paper's declining circulation as he had done in Tulsa and Minneapolis. One of his innovations at the Chronicle was the creation of a regular help column called "Watchem," where ordinary citizens could voice their complaints. The Chicago Tribune later called this column a pioneer and prototype of the modern newspaper "Action Line." Steven's progressive views soon created conflict with the Houston Endowment board, especially when he editorially supported the election of Lyndon B. Johnson, the Democratic candidate for president in 1964.

In 1964, the Chronicle purchased the assets of its evening newspaper competitor, the Houston Press, becoming the only evening newspaper in the city. By then, the Chronicle had a circulation of 254,000 - the largest of any paper in Texas. The Atlantic Monthly credited the growth to the changes instigated by Steven. (Note: By the time Steven was removed from the paper in 1965, Newsweek reported the daily circulation was 278,630.)

Steven named Robert T. Cochran as chief of the paper's editorial page. Cochran opened the page to leading national columnists, such as James Reston and Max Freedman, replacing more conservative columnists, such as Fulton Lewis, Jr. and Paul Harvey.

In the summer of 1965, Jones decided to buy a local television station that was already owned by the Houston Endowment. He resigned from the Houston Endowment board to avoid a conflict of interest, though he remained as publisher of the Chronicle. On September 2, 1965, Jones made a late-night visit to the Steven home, where he broke the news that the Endowment board had ordered him to dismiss Steven. Jones had to comply. On September 3, the paper published a story announcing that Everett Collier was now the new editor. No mention was made of Steven or the Houston Endowment board. Houston Post staff wrote an article about the change, but top management killed it. Only two weekly papers in Houston: Forward Times (which targeted the African-American community) and the Houston Tribune (an ultra conservative paper) mentioned the firing. Both papers had rather small circulations and no influence among the city's business community. The two major newspapers in Houston never mentioned Steven for many years thereafter.

A Time magazine article gave much of the credit for increasing circulations to changes made by Steven. Some of these changes included:

- Moving his own desk into the open newsroom to improve interaction with his staff of reporters;
- Instituting an "action line" for readers, with prompt follow-up by Chronicle staff;
- Vowing to print the name of every Houstonian at some time;
- Adding a Mexico City bureau and expanded the bureau in Austin, Texas;
- Hiring a science editor to improve coverage of the new crewed space flight center.

Saul Friedman, one of the young reporters Steven recruited, later wrote that Steven was neither as aggressive or as liberal as the Houston conservatives claimed. His closest and most important political allies in Texas were LBJ and Governor John B. Connally.

== Personal life ==
After moving to Tulsa, Steven met Esther Lucile ("Lucy") Shoemaker, daughter of John David Shoemaker and Rachel Elizabeth Hix. Both parents had moved to Tulsa from Marshall, Illinois, where Lucy was born in 1910. Bill and Lucy married in Tulsa on July 7, 1934. They had three daughters and one son. Lucy died on March 15, 1999, in Sarasota, Florida.
