= All Souls Unitarian Church =

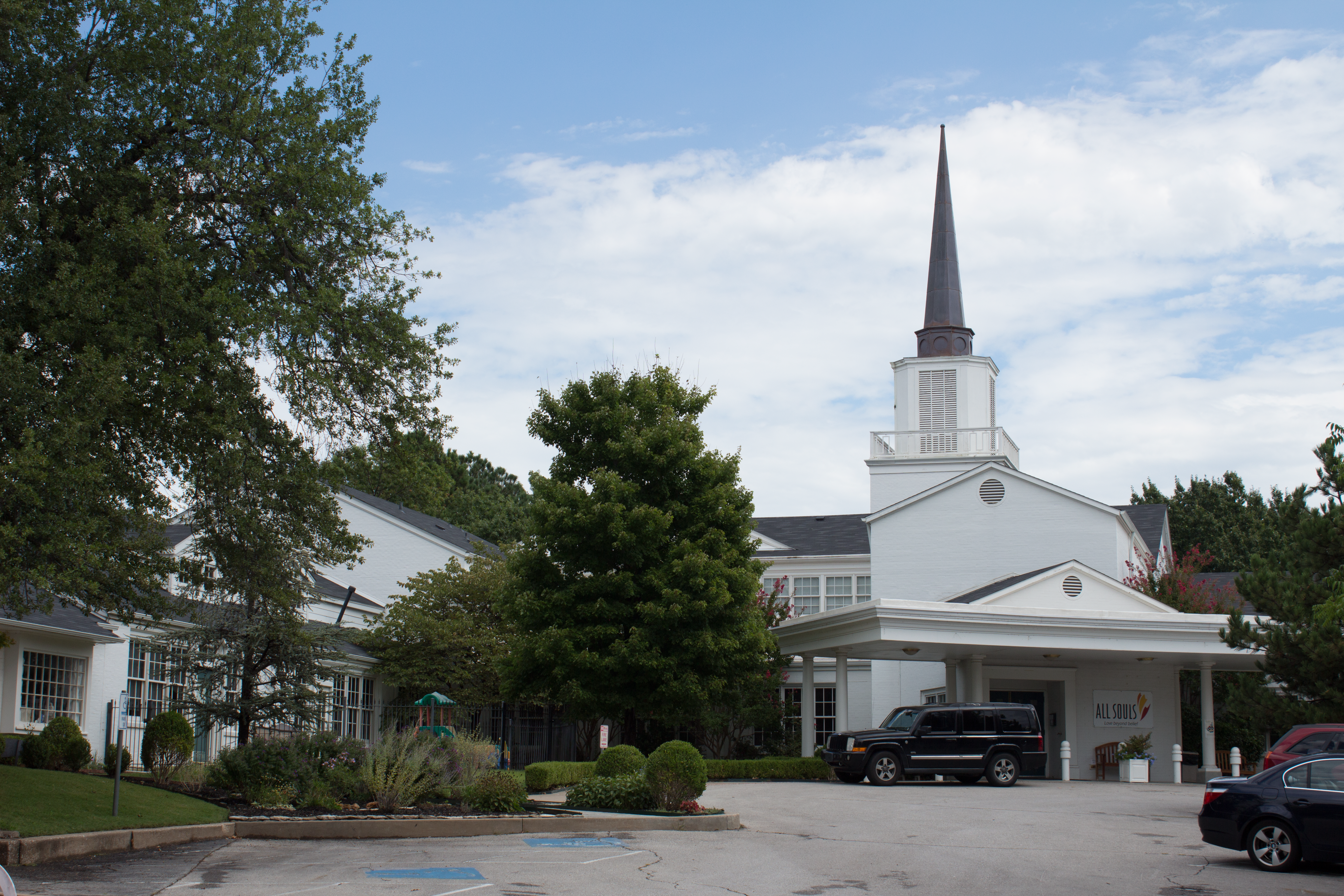
- All Souls Unitarian Church
- 36.121181°N 95.976332°W
- Location: Tulsa, Oklahoma
- Country: United States
- Denomination: Unitarian Universalist Association
- Tradition: Unitarian Universalism
- Website: allsoulschurch.org

History
- Status: Church
- Founded: 1921

Architecture
- Functional status: Active
- Architect: John Duncan Forsyth
- Completed: 1955

All Souls Unitarian Church is a Unitarian Universalist (UU) church in Tulsa, Oklahoma. It is one of the largest UU congregations in the world.

All Souls Unitarian Church was founded in 1921 by two leading Tulsans from families with Unitarian roots: Richard Lloyd Jones, the publisher of the Tulsa Tribune daily newspaper, whose father, Rev. Jenkin Lloyd Jones, had served as secretary of the Western Unitarian Conference and founded All Souls Church in Chicago; and William Rea (W. R.) Holway, an engineer who was instrumental in the development of Tulsa's water resources.

== History ==
=== Early years ===
The church began when Richard Lloyd Jones ran an advertisement in the Tribune seeking people interested in starting a "liberal church". The group, originally calling itself All Souls Liberal Church, met at Tulsa's City Hall, Jones's house, Temple Israel, and the Majestic movie theater before erecting their own building at 14th and Boulder in 1930 and 1931.

In 1957, the church moved to its current home at 2952 South Peoria, adjacent to the historic Maple Ridge district. This building was designed by Tulsa architect John Duncan Forsyth, who also designed the E. W. Marland Mansion in Ponca City, Southern Hills Country Club, and Pensacola Dam at Grand Lake o' the Cherokees, the last of which also involved All Souls co-founder W. R. Holway as chief engineer.

=== Ministry of John Wolf ===
In 1960, John Wolf (1925–2017) became senior minister. He became prominent as a liberal activist in Tulsa's predominantly conservative politics, and his church grew to become the largest Unitarian congregation in the world.

Early in his ministry at All Souls, Wolf began building bridges with other religious leaders in Tulsa. The Tulsa Council of Churches (TCC) had previously excluded groups whose beliefs did not coincide with those held by the majority of its members. Those ineligible to join included Roman Catholics, Jews, Unitarians and Muslims. In 1965, inspired by Dr. Martin Luther King's call for leaders of all churches to join him in his Freedom March at Selma, Alabama, Wolf called for an ecumenical (and integrated) service to be hosted by All Souls. Such an event had never before happened in Tulsa. Many church leaders participated. (Note: Hold-outs were notably hard-core Protestant evangelicals, including the influential Oral Roberts.) Soon afterward, the TCC opened its membership to those religious faiths that it had previously declared as ineligible.

Some of Wolf's notable causes included his efforts to reform the funeral industry; his leadership of protests against the administration of the Tulsa Public Schools; a controversial sermon entitled "Tulsa is a Hick Town" that was credited with leading to the construction of the Tulsa Performing Arts Center; his consistent pro-choice activism; and his frequent criticisms of Tulsa's most famous evangelist leader, Oral Roberts.

In 1974 All Souls began a broadcast ministry, initially known as Univision, that included a multipart series hosted by Wolf called Faith in the Free Church.

Wolf took emeritus status in 1995, and remained active until his death in 2017 at age 92. Under his successors, Brent Smith and the current senior minister, Marlin Lavanhar, the church's activism has continued.

=== Ministry of Marlin Lavanhar ===
In 2000, the All Souls' congregation, then comprising about 1,000 members, voted to call Reverend Marlin Lavanhar as its senior minister. Lavanhar had grown up in suburban Chicago, Illinois, where he grew up in the Unitarian Universalist Church. After high school, he moved to New Orleans, and earned a Bachelor of Arts degree in sociology at Tulane University in 1990. After graduation, he and a friend moved to Kyoto, Japan, to work and study for two years. (Note: His work in Kyoto involved teaching both the English language and American culture.) The pair then began a three-year adventure traveling the world on mountain bikes. They covered about 20,000 miles, to learn about religions and religious practices in different cultures and traditions. Not only did he study the main religions along the route (Buddhism, Judaism, Hinduism, Islam, and Christianity), he searched out Unitarian-related communities on Negros island in the Philippines, in the Khasi Hills of Northeast India, and in Pakistan, Sri Lanka, the Czech Republic, Hungary, and Romania. He later said that the journey helped him recognize that he was called to become a Unitarian minister.

Returning home from his adventures, Lavanhar decided to enroll at the Harvard Divinity School. He earned the Master of Divinity degree in 1999, then was ordained by the Unitarian Universalist Association in 1999. He first went to be minister of outreach at the historic First and Second Church in Boston. Then he was sent as pastor to the North Shore Unitarian Church in Deerfield, Illinois, where he became better known throughout the UUA for developing the "Soulful Sundown Service", designed to attract young people. In 2000, the All Souls search committee met with him, heard him preach and evidently were quite impressed. Although he had no experience running even a small church, he had so many other qualifications they were seeking that they had no difficulty in recommending him to their own congregation. At the age of 31, he became the youngest senior minister in the UUA.

Lavanhar was a leading opponent of the Tulsa Zoo's controversial (and short-lived) 2005 decision to include a creationism exhibit. Lavanhar presided over the 2004 memorial service for Fern Holland, a Tulsa lawyer and human rights activist who was the first U.S. civilian to be killed in the Iraq War. In February 2010 he traveled to Uganda to speak in opposition to the proposed Uganda Anti-Homosexuality Bill. All Souls has also been noted for its efforts to re-examine the 1921 Tulsa race massacre, including the controversial role of the church's co-founder and Tribune publisher Richard Lloyd Jones, as well as the riot's lasting impact in Tulsa.

In the summer of 2008 the church rented space to New Dimensions, the congregation of Carlton Pearson, a prominent evangelist, former protégé of Oral Roberts, and bishop of the Church of God in Christ, who was declared a heretic by a group of Pentecostal bishops for preaching his "Gospel of Inclusion", a message that salvation is afforded to all persons including non-Christians. At the end of the summer, Bishop Pearson dissolved New Dimensions and invited the members of his congregation to join him in signing the membership book at All Souls, and to enroll their children in the church's religious education program.

All Souls began hosting the All Soul Acoustic Coffeehouse in 2008 in Emerson Hall, founded by Anitra Lavanhar, wife of the church's senior minister. The coffeehouse is not a part of the church's official program, but is a monthly venue for music aficionados. Lavanhar was first exposed to the concept of a smoke-free acoustic coffeehouse that catered to folk musicians while living in Boston. It is a non-profit venture, staffed by eight volunteers. The music is predominantly blues, bluegrass and alternative country style. Attendance varies, but has reportedly been as high as 200.

The influx of new members received attention for the concurrent move to introduce a worship liturgy with the livelier, predominantly African-American Pentecostal style of Pearson's followers during one of the church's two Sunday services.

As the church has continued to grow in recent years, it has strained the capacity of its Maple Ridge campus, where the main sanctuary has a seating capacity of only 400 people. Expansion plans were developed in 2007 and 2008 but not pursued. In 2011, serious consideration began of a master plan to move the church to a new Downtown Tulsa campus. The block, donated by three families who have been long-time members of the congregation, is bounded by Frankfort and Kenosha avenues and Sixth and Seventh streets. In November 2011, the congregation voted to accept the donation of a vacant city block in downtown's East Village neighborhood. In 2017 a membership vote reaffirmed the church's intention to move downtown; if sufficient and timely financing is raised, the schedule calls for the new campus to open in time for the church's 100th anniversary in 2021.

One historian of the UU movement has described All Souls Unitarian Church as a "prominent" example of a small group of urban UU churches that became "powerful voices of liberal religion in their communities and in the nation."

== Largest Unitarian Universalist congregation ==
All Souls Unitarian Church has been identified as one of the largest UU congregations for many years. A second Unitarian church, Hope Unitarian Church in south Tulsa, was established in 1968, drawing off some membership; later, another small spin-off, Church of the Restoration, was started in the Greenwood district. In the early 2000s, All Souls Unitarian dropped some inactive members from its rolls, and for a time it was supplanted in the top spot by Unitarian Church of All Souls in New York City and then by the First Unitarian Society of Madison, Wisconsin.

The Unitarian Universalist Association certified membership statistics have shown All Souls Unitarian to have the largest congregation of any single-church UU congregation since at least 2009; as of April 29, 2022, All Souls Unitarian had 1,512 members, more than any other church-based congregation. The only larger congregation is the Church of the Larger Fellowship, an outreach ministry.
