= Jenkin Lloyd Jones Sr. =

American newspaper publisher and editor

- Born: 1911 or 1912
- Died: February 24, 2004 (aged 92)
- Occupation: Newspaper editor
- Known for: The Tulsa Tribune

Jenkin Lloyd Jones Sr. (1911/1912 – February 24, 2004) was the longtime owner and editor of the Tulsa Tribune.

In 1933, Jones earned a degree in philosophy from the University of Wisconsin.

Jones was the editor of the Tulsa Tribune from 1941 to 1988 and its publisher until 1991. Lloyd Jones's father Richard Lloyd Jones had bought the newspaper in 1919 from businessman-philanthropist Charles Page, and had also served as its editor. His brother Richard Lloyd Jones Jr. served as president. His son Jenkin “Jenk” Lloyd Jones Jr. took over as editor and then publisher when Jones Sr. retired.

Jones Sr. was also the president of the American Society of Newspaper Editors in 1956, and was inducted into the Oklahoma Journalism Hall of Fame in 1972.

He died on February 24, 2004, at age 92.

== Family ==
Jones's father, Richard Lloyd Jones, was a cousin of noted architect Frank Lloyd Wright, who designed his home in Tulsa in 1929. (Note: Although the house is no longer owned by the Wright family, it is still known locally as the "Richard Lloyd Jones House".) The house, officially known as Westhope, was added to the National Register of Historic Places (NRHP) on April 10, 1975. Its NRIS number is 75001575.
