= Richard Lloyd Jones =

American journalist (1873–1963)

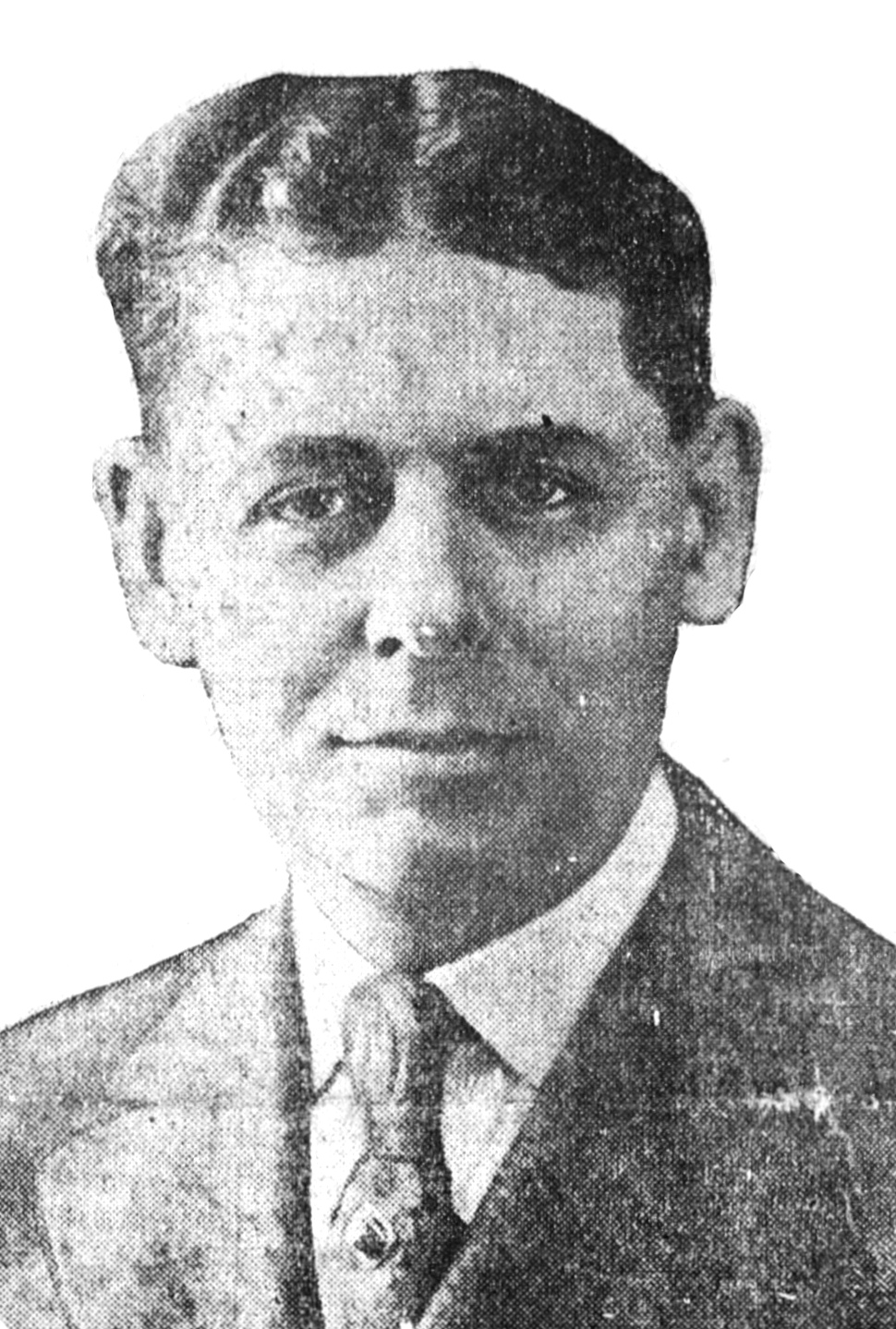
- Born: April 14, 1873; Janesville, Wisconsin, U.S.
- Died: December 4, 1963 (aged 90); Tulsa, Oklahoma, U.S.
- Resting place: Memorial Park Cemetery
- Education: Law School of the Old University of Chicago
- Occupations: Journalist, Editor
- Years active: 1899–1963
- Known for: Owner, publisher and editor of the Tulsa Tribune
- Political party: Republican
- Spouse: Georgia Hayden
- Children: Jenkin Lloyd Jones, Sr., Richard Lloyd Jones, Jr.
- Parent(s): Jenkin Lloyd Jones, Susan Barber

Richard Lloyd Jones (April 14, 1873 – December 4, 1963) was an American journalist who was the long-time editor and publisher of the now defunct Tulsa Tribune. He was noted for his controversial positions on political issues. The son of a notable Unitarian missionary, Jenkin Lloyd Jones, he was a co-founder of All Souls Unitarian Universalist Church in Tulsa, Oklahoma.

== Early life ==
Richard Lloyd Jones was the only son of Welsh born Jenkin Lloyd Jones and Susan Barber. He was born April 14, 1873, in Janesville, Wisconsin. He was named for his paternal grandfather, Richard Lloyd Jones. His father and mother were both leaders of the Western Unitarian Conference. In 1881, the family moved to Chicago, Illinois, where his father had been called as the settled minister of All Souls Unitarian Church. A biography says that Richard was athletically inclined and proficient in a number of sports, including swimming, skating, tennis, and horsemanship. The article suggests that there was some tension between the boy and his parents, who had high scholastic ambitions for him. During his youth, he left home to work on a Nevada sheep ranch, but his parents insisted that he return home and pursue higher education. He studied for a while at the University of Wisconsin, then entered the University of Chicago, where he graduated with an LL.B. in 1897 and a LL.M. in 1898.

Jones worked briefly as a lawyer, but did not stay long in this profession. In 1899, he was hired as a reporter and editor by the Telegram of Stamford, Connecticut. He was an editorial writer for the Washington Times from 1900 to 1902, and an editor for Cosmopolitan Magazine in 1902–1903. From 1903 until 1911, he was a writer and associate editor for Collier's Weekly, working under the publisher Robert J. Collier.

In 1905, Robert Collier and Jones collaborated to buy the old Abraham Lincoln farm at auction in Hodgenville, Kentucky. Then they organized a fundraising campaign to establish a historic site, which was opened during the Lincoln Centennial in 1909. The first board of trustees for the site included Jones, Jenkin Lloyd Jones, Mark Twain, William Jennings Bryan and President William H. Taft.

From 1905 until 1911 he was a member of the Federal Prison Labor Commission. This service confirming in his mind that the system reformed nobody, but turned them into hardened criminals. He editorialized, "...our whole prison system is born of ignorance and arrogance; it is medieval; it is the most fruitful factory we have for making criminals. They do not reform but confirm criminals. They break down self-respect when, what the individual needs, and what the state needs, is self-respect built up."

By 1911, Jones had decided to buy his own newspaper. His friend, the Wisconsin senator Robert M. La Follette, Sr., helped him buy the Wisconsin State Journal. He and his paper supported La Follette until 1917, when the two broke over the issue of American entry into World War I. Jones supported American involvement, while both his father and Senator La Follette vigorously opposed it. His city editor resigned to found his own newspaper. Realizing that he had made powerful political enemies, he decided to sell this paper and move out of the state.

== Tulsa Tribune ==
In 1919, Jones learned that businessman-philanthropist Charles Page wanted to sell one of the two newspapers that he owned in Tulsa, Oklahoma. According to Jones's grandson, David, his grandfather met with Page and told him, "Charlie, you've got a paper and you don't want one. I want a paper and I don't have one. Sell me your paper." The deal was done and the Tulsa Democrat became the Tulsa Tribune on December 1, 1919.

Jones immediately took up a long-running local political issue: the Spavinaw Water Project. Tulsa leaders had been studying alternative sources of city water since at least 1915. The two most viable candidates were Shell Creek, owned by Charles Page, and Spavinaw Creek. The Tulsa Democrat, then owned by Page, naturally supported Shell Creek, while the rival Tulsa World, supported Spavinaw Creek. Page's proposal was rejected when tests showed that the quantity was inadequate to meet Tulsa's expected needs and construction of the Spavinaw project began in 1922.

=== Tulsa race massacre controversy ===
On May 31, 1921, the Tulsa Tribune published a story in the afternoon edition with the headline: "Nab Negro for Attacking Girl In an Elevator", describing the alleged assault of a white elevator operator by a young black man named Dick Rowland. In the same edition, the paper allegedly had an editorial warning of a potential lynching of Rowland. The editorial, allegedly titled "To Lynch Negro Tonight", was said to have reported that white people were assembling that evening to lynch the teenage Rowland. The paper was known to have a "sensationalist" style of news writing. It is unclear if the paper had a source for the possible lynching.

Several years later, researchers discovered that the editorial in question was missing, apparently having been removed from the Tribune's archives, as well as the 'Oklahoma Edition' of the Tribune in the state archives. No known copies of the editorial, which some credit as the primary incitement of the Tulsa Race Massacre of 1921, exist today.

Some people have claimed that the Tribune article and editorial was a cause of the assault on Greenwood that night and the next day. Jones never discussed or wrote about this occurrence. He neither took responsibility nor apologized for it, and the paper never again discussed the massacre.

Rowland's life was saved that night, largely through the efforts of the Tulsa County sheriff. Ultimately, a jury found the charges against Rowland were false. He was released and left the city after the massacre was over.

=== Other controversial issues ===
Other controversies ensued. The World editorially supported the Democratic Party and opposed the Ku Klux Klan. Jones embraced the Republicans. The Tribune never supported a Democratic presidential candidate. Only once was there an editorial supporting a gubernatorial candidate. Although the Tribune did not endorse the Klan's unlawful activities, it implied support of the organization's stated goals, saying: "The KKK of Tulsa has promised to do the American thing in the American way." In 1923, he was named alongside Klan leaders as a defendant in a lawsuit by S. K. Lesky, who was tarred and feathered by the Klan.

Jones crusaded against prohibition and corruption in state and local politics. He also supported issues such as reapportionment of the Oklahoma State Legislature, a merit system for state appointments, a modern highway system, fluoridation of drinking water, and economic diversification. Still, as time passed, he moved farther to the right politically. He supported Senator Joseph McCarthy for his anti-Communism and editorialized against Senator Paul Douglas for his opposition to McCarthy.

=== Joint publication with the Tulsa World ===
In 1941, Jones joined forces with his rival, Eugene Lorton, to establish the Newspaper Printing Corporation (NPC), which would print both the Tribune and the World. The management and editorial staffs of the two papers remained separate. NPC was dissolved after the Tribune went out of business in 1992.

== Personal life ==
Jones married Georgia Hayden (1875–1967) of Eau Claire, Wisconsin, on April 30, 1907. She became an advocate of liberal causes such as women's suffrage, humane treatment of animals, control of children's diseases and Planned Parenthood. The couple had three children: Richard Lloyd Jones, Jr. (born 1909), Jenkin Lloyd Jones (1911–2004), and Florence Lloyd (1914–2004). According to the 1920 U. S, Census, Richard, Jr. was born in New York, while the other children were born in Wisconsin. They all would later work for the Tribune, effectively making it a family enterprise.

Richard Lloyd Jones was a cousin of noted architect Frank Lloyd Wright, who designed "Westhope", the editor's home in Tulsa in 1929. (Note: Although the house is no longer owned by the Lloyd Wright family, it is still known locally as the "Richard Lloyd Jones House".) The house was added to the National Register of Historic Places (NRHP) on April 10, 1975. Its NRIS number is 75001575.

Jones was raised in a strongly religious family. His parents, grandparents and much of the extended family were lifelong Unitarians. After founding the Tulsa Tribune, he started publishing a "Saturday Sermonette," covering his thoughts about a moral subject. In 1920, he published an advertisement in the Tribune inviting religious liberals to a meeting in his home. The meeting led to the founding of All Souls Unitarian Universalist Church in Tulsa during the following year. Jones also led a fundraising campaign for the construction of the original church building, and successfully attracted funds from non-members. W. R. Holway, a notable engineer and lifelong Unitarian, served as the co-founder. Jones served as vice president of the American Unitarian Association during 1942–44.

== Death and legacy ==
Jones died December 4, 1963. He was buried in Memorial Park Cemetery of Tulsa, Oklahoma. His widow, Georgia, died in 1967 and is buried beside him.

Jones was inducted into the Oklahoma Hall of Fame in 1952.

The Tulsa Tribune continued for nearly three decades after Richard Lloyd Jones' death. His elder son, Jenkin Lloyd Jones, Sr., who had become editor in 1941 and was a noted syndicated newspaper writer, replaced his father as publisher. Jenkin's son, Jenkin Lloyd Jones, Jr, became the publisher after his father died in 1991. He continued until the paper ceased publication in 1992.
