= Westhope =

Historic house in Tulsa, Oklahoma

- U.S. National Register of Historic Places
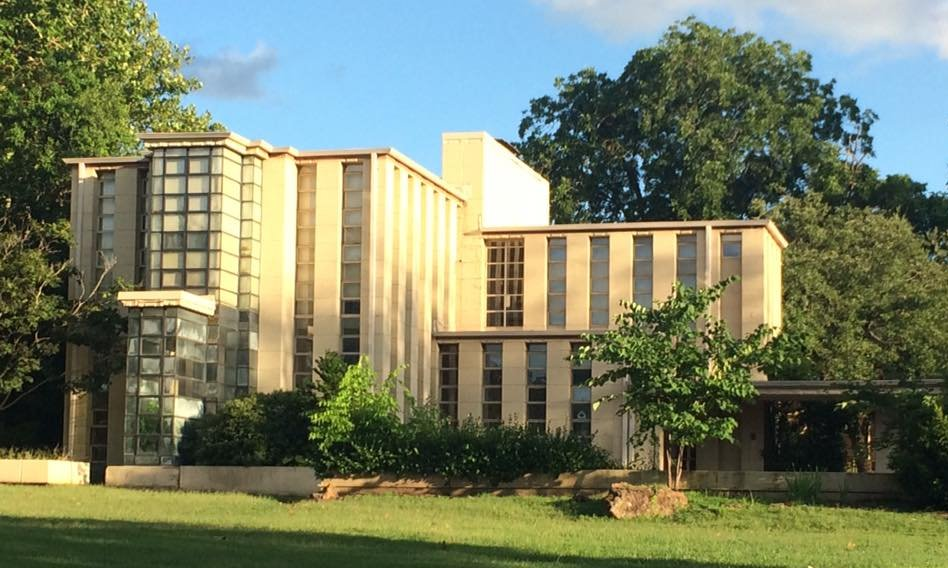
- Westhope

- Location within Oklahoma Location within the United States
- Interactive map showing Westhope's location
- Location: 3700 S. Birmingham Ave., Tulsa, Oklahoma
- Coordinates: 36°6′35″N 95°57′15″W
- Built: 1929
- Architect: Frank Lloyd Wright
- Architectural style: Textile Block
- NRHP reference No.: 75001575
- Added to NRHP: April 10, 1975

Westhope, also known as the Richard Lloyd Jones House, is a house at 3704 South Birmingham Avenue in the Midtown neighborhood of Tulsa, Oklahoma, United States. Designed by Frank Lloyd Wright, it was completed in 1931 for his cousin Richard Lloyd Jones, the publisher of the Tulsa Tribune. It is one of three buildings in Oklahoma that Wright designed, and it has sometimes been cited as the only one of Wright's textile-block houses outside California. The structure is listed on the National Register of Historic Places.

Westhope is a two-story structure on a flat prairie site covering about 2 acres (0.81 ha). The estate includes a guesthouse, a garage, lawns, a pool, and a pond. Westhope's textile blocks are arranged in vertical piers, which are fastened together by metal rebar and lack decorations. The textile block piers alternate with vertical glass bays with 5,200 panes of glass covering almost half the exterior of the structure. The home is variously cited as having five or six bedrooms and is one of Wright's largest house designs. The spaces are arranged in an open plan, intersecting at 90-degree angles, and are decorated with textile blocks. The house was controversial when it was completed, with some observers comparing it to a glass house or a penitentiary.

Wright informally discussed plans for the house with the Joneses during 1928, and Jones sent him a list of specifications later that year. After Wright revised the plans, Jones hired Paul Mueller as the Jones House's general contractor, and construction began in 1930. The building exceeded its original construction budget, with a final cost of $100,000. Jones died at his house in 1963, and his widow sold it to the local architect M. Murray McCune, who renovated it. Westhope was subsequently sold to the Nelson family in 1982, the Holden family in the late 1980s, and the Tyson family in 1993. After falling into disrepair, the house was sold in 2021 to the investor Stuart Price, who renovated the house before reselling it in 2025.

== Site ==
The Richard Lloyd Jones House is located at 3704 South Birmingham Avenue in the Midtown neighborhood of Tulsa, Oklahoma, United States. The site covers almost 2 acres (0.81 ha) and is located on a flat prairie. When the house was built, it faced the Arkansas River, and the house could be seen from the Arkansas River valley as far as 40 miles (64 km) away. What is now the Turkey Mountain Urban Wilderness Area, across the river to the southwest, was also visible from the house. The estate includes a 800-square-foot (74 m^{2}) guesthouse, which includes a living–dining room, a bathroom, and two bedrooms. Also on the estate is a garage, which is variously cited as having a capacity of four or five cars. There is also a koi pond, a lawn, and a swimming pool, in addition to a workshop building, garden room, and patios.

== Architecture ==
The Jones House, built for the family of the newspaper publisher Richard Lloyd Jones, is sometimes known as Westhope or the Big House. It is one of three structures that Frank Lloyd Wright (Jones's cousin) designed in Oklahoma, the others being the Harold Price Jr. House and the Price Tower in Bartlesville. Westhope has also sometimes been cited as Wright's only textile-block house to be built outside California, where he had designed the Millard House, the Storer House, the Freeman House, and the Ennis House in the 1920s. Throughout his career, Wright tended to not use ornamental motifs in his designs, the California houses being an exception to this rule; one writer said that "from the Jones House on, the ornamental in Wright's buildings became increasingly pure architecture".

=== Exterior ===
Various parts of the exterior range in height from one to two stories, and the facade is articulated so that some of the rooms inside are visually separate from the rest of the house. Similarly to in Wright's California houses, Westhope's textile blocks are fastened together by metal rebar, rather than the mortar joints used in contemporary masonry buildings. The textile blocks alternate with vertical bays of glass, which are the same width as the textile-block piers. Wright had previously used such a design, with alternating glass bays and concrete piers, in the Millard House's living room. All of Westhope's concrete blocks have embedded specks of pigmentation, in contrast to the untinted blocks of Wright's California houses, though Wright had previously considered using pigmented blocks on two occasions. (Note: The plans for the unbuilt Doheny Ranch included some pigmented blocks, and similar blocks were suggested (but not used) on the Storer House.) The blocks are variously described as having a yellow or "Oklahoma pink" hue. The floor slabs are beveled and are not visible on the facade.

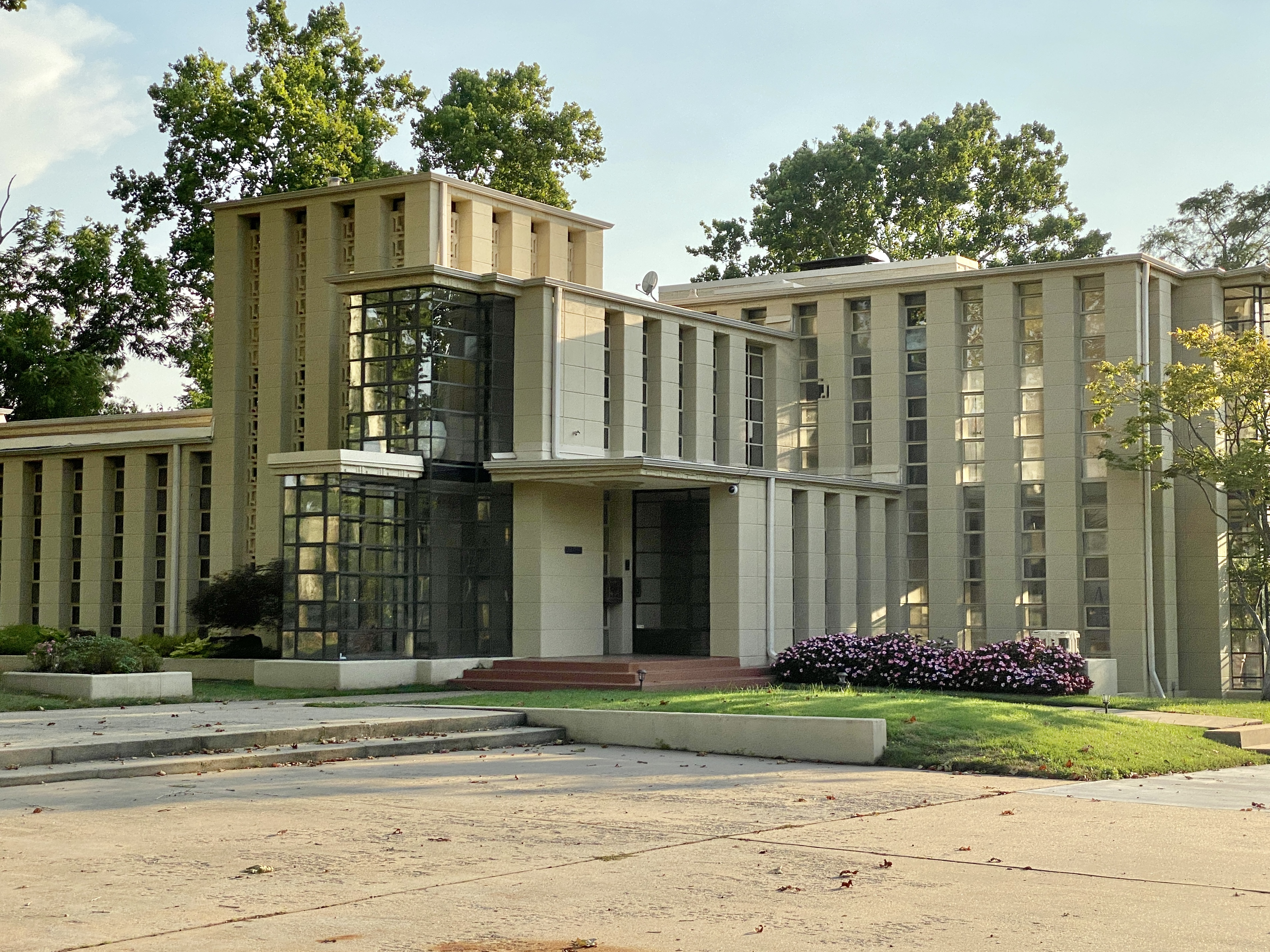
View of the facade, showing the main entrance at center and a grid of glass panes to the left of the entrance

Westhope's blocks lack decorative engravings and measure 20 inches (510 mm) wide; they are variously cited as measuring 10 inches (250 mm) or 15 inches (380 mm) long. The blocks contrast with those of the California houses which used blocks measuring 16 by 16 inches (410 by 410 mm) across, with engraved patterns. The architectural writer Robert McCarter quoted another commentator as saying that Westhope's larger blocks "produce a paradoxical decrease in apparent mass". The exterior walls are made of two layers of textile blocks, and each block has grooves where metal rebar is inserted. Waterproof cement is poured into the joints between each block. In addition, there is an asphalt veneer along the inner faces of the outer layer of blocks, which Wright believed would be waterproof and fireproof. The exterior blocks were created using hinged-metal molds.

The home features 5,200 panes of glass covering almost half the exterior of the structure, which are arranged in strips measuring 20 inches wide. The window panes are arranged in grids, and some elevations of the facade are made entirely of glass. The grids are composed of copper frames with movable or fixed-position glass panes that swing outward. According to Wright, the movable windows would make the building easier to heat and cool down. The window frames are held in place by vertical grooves engraved into the blocks. The vertical design details of Westhope's facade contrasted significantly with Wright's previous Prairie Style work, which tended to be horizontally-oriented, with flat roofs and horizontal bands of windows.

=== Interior ===
The home is variously cited as having five or six bedrooms. There are five bathrooms, including one partial bathroom. (Note: Some sources cite the house as having four bathrooms as a result.) It encompasses approximately 10,400 square feet (970 m^{2}), (Note: Some sources give a more precise measurement of 10,405 square feet (966.7 m^{2}). Other sources cite a much smaller figure of 8,443 square feet (784.4 m^{2}).) making it one of the largest houses Wright ever designed. The spaces are divided across two stories and are arranged on a grid measuring 5 feet (1.5 m) across. Despite the house's large size, the interior spaces are arranged to create a cozy ambience.

==== Materials ====
The concrete floor slabs were poured in-place. The rooms are separated by half-height partition walls. The walls, which connect various pillars supporting the ceiling, were intended to give the house a more open feel. The interior walls are made of plain textile blocks, while the ceilings are made of coffered textile blocks with patterned fascia, forming a grid. The ceiling grid was not part of the original plan, which called for concrete ceiling beams spaced every 2 feet (0.61 m). The perforated blocks were created using plaster molds, and the ceiling blocks with fascia were constructed using wooden molds. To save money, Wright did not use mill-work in the house.

Although Westhope was built with steam radiators, it originally had no cooling system; when a cooling system was added, the ducts were hidden behind grilles; The heating vents and lighting are hidden behind decorative blocks with perforated patterns. There are five fireplaces throughout the house, in addition to mid-century modern furniture and chairs inspired by some of Wright's other designs. Some of the furniture is similar in style to pieces that Wright would design for John Nesbitt at the Ennis House in 1942. Wright had initially planned to construct furniture made of Met-L-Wood, a material composed of wood with aluminum sheets on either side, but Jones reported that this material was uncomfortable. Though most of the Met-L-Wood furniture was not built because of cost overruns during construction, Wright did design a cabinet, bookshelves, and a desk and chair for Jones's study.

==== Rooms ====
The spaces are arranged in an open plan, blending into one another and intersecting at 90-degree angles. The first floor includes the communal spaces, including the foyer, living room, dining room, game room, recreation room, and kitchen. The foyer, stairs, dining room, and kitchen are clustered within a cruciform room in one corner of the first floor. Extending beyond it is the living room, The living room has full-height glass windows and is called the lantern room; it is named for the fact that, at night, the room seemed to glow like a lantern. The eastern wall of the living room faces the street and is shorter, without any canopies above it. The western wall of the living room faces the house's swimming pool and is shaded under a canopy. When the house was built, the western wall also had an exterior loggia.

The dining room, surrounded on all sides by other rooms, has a wet bar and two kitchen islands. Next to the kitchen and slightly below the living room is a sunken family room or billiards room. Both the billiards room and the entrance foyer have glass conservatories protruding into the house's yards. Two of the bedrooms (including the master bedroom), two bathrooms, and a study are located on the first floor next to the communal spaces. These rooms are located in one corner of the living room, while a maid's bedroom and garage are diagonally across the living room from the bedrooms. The other bathrooms and bedrooms are on the second floor, while there is an observation tower above the second floor.

== History ==
Between 1923 and 1924, Wright had designed the four textile-block houses in California, three of them nearly simultaneously. These buildings leaked because of deficiencies in the concrete that was used to create each of the California houses. After he completed the California houses, Wright occasionally used concrete blocks along with other methods of construction, in such buildings as the Arizona Biltmore Hotel.

Richard Lloyd Jones was six years younger than Wright. In the 1900s and 1910s, Jones had worked at various newspapers, at one point owning the Wisconsin State Journal before becoming the Tulsa Tribune's publisher in 1919. Jones and Wright had differing personalities and frequently made sarcastic quips at one another, but they were close friends. Wright was in debt for much of his life, and his financial status was even more precarious during the Great Depression, while Jones was somewhat more financially successful. Jones wanted to hire Wright not only to give his struggling cousin some money, but also to provide for Jones, his wife, and their three children (Richard Jr., Jenkin and Florence). Subsequently, Jones and his family bought about 4 acres (1.6 ha) on a hill near the Arkansas River in Tulsa.

=== Development ===
==== Early plans ====
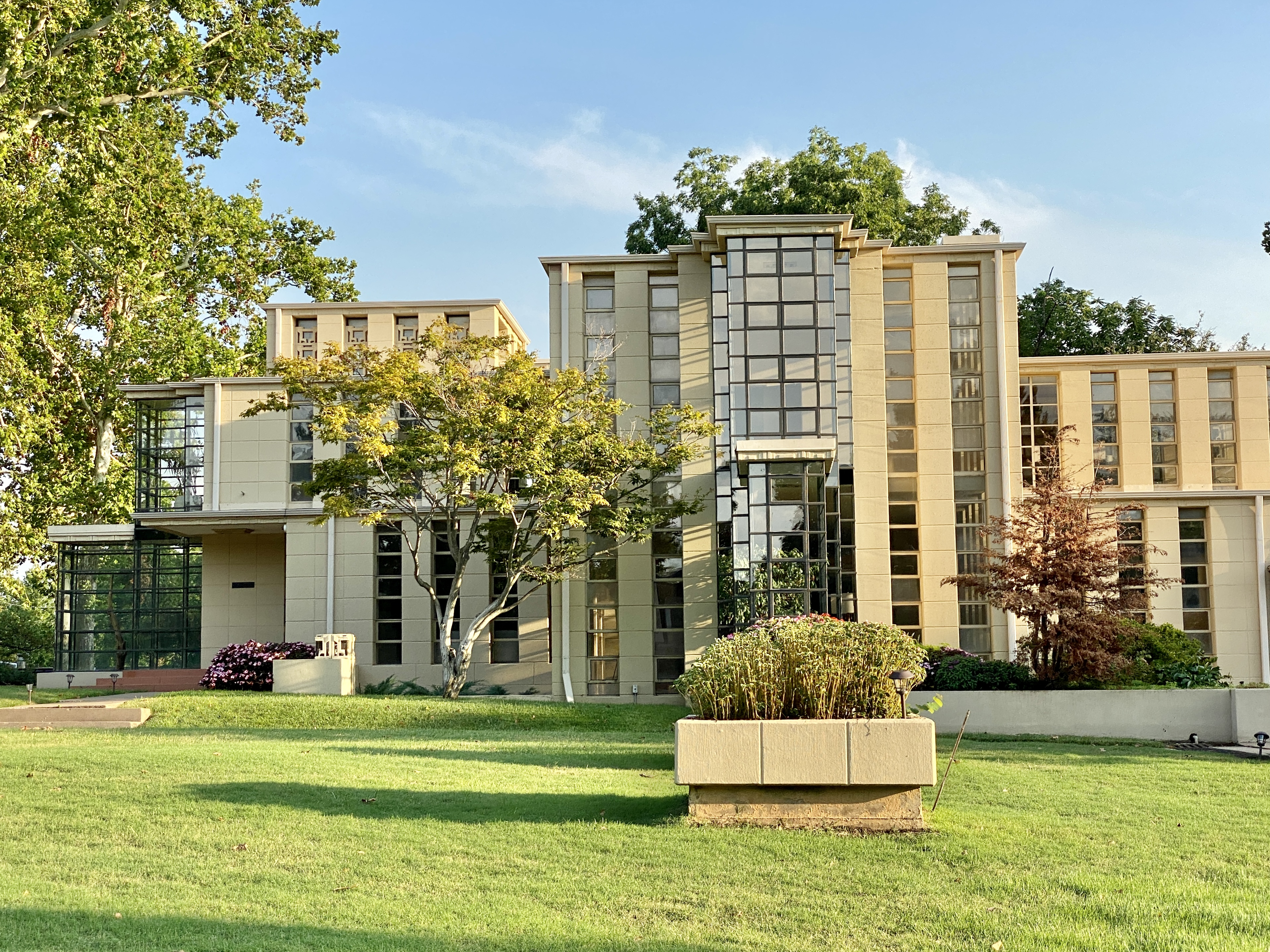
Main entrance facade. The center of the facade is made of glass panes, while the rest of the facade has alternating glass bays and concrete piers.

Wright informally discussed plans for the house with the Joneses during 1928. According to Jones's son Jenkin, Wright had initially sketched out a "rambling" wood and stucco house with a nearly-flat roof, surrounding a courtyard; the writer Meryle Secrest stated that such a design would have been in line with Jones's tastes and similar Oklahoma houses. Conversely, the writer Robert Sweeney says that Wright's original drawings called for a building with a steep roof over part of it, arranged on a grid of 30-60-90 triangles. In November 1928, Wright wrote a particularly caustic letter to Jones describing him as "a Puritan and a publican of the worst stripe", Jones wrote an angry nine-page response. After this dispute, Jones wrote to Wright detailing what he wanted in the new house. Jones stipulated that the house have a living room, a dining room, a billiards room, a study, five bedrooms, and a four-car garage. The original budget has variously been cited as $30,000 or $40,000. (Note: Equivalent to $430,000–574,000 in 2024 (Note: Johnston, Louis; Williamson, Samuel H. (2023). "What Was the U.S. GDP Then?". MeasuringWorth. United States Gross Domestic Product deflator figures follow the MeasuringWorth series.))

Jones was initially reluctant to use textile blocks, as he had heard that they were prone to leaks, but Wright reassured him that two layers of concrete blocks would be used for waterproofing. Wright worked on the plans at the Ocotillo Desert Camp in Arizona during early 1929, and Jones's wife consulted him several times during that period. For the first time in his career, Wright decided to draw out axonometric projections, with cutaway drawings of the house. During that time, work on the design was largely stalled, even though Jones had given Wright a $1,000 advance payment. (Note: Equivalent to $14,000 in 2024) Jones also sent Wright four sets of sketches, which Wright largely ignored. At the time, Jones had a budget of $50,000. (Note: Equivalent to $717,000 in 2024) Wright was struggling to keep the Ocotillo Desert Camp operational by April 1929, so Jones gave him some money, often accompanied by sarcastic quips. Jones eventually sent over most of Wright's $5,000 architectural fee for the house. (Note: Equivalent to $72,000 in 2024)

Jones asked Wright to send over detailed sketches of the floor plan several times, but Wright originally did not do so, as he tended not to sketch out the floor plans first. Wright's original plans included few of the features that Jones had requested. The plans called for a structure arranged on a diagonal grid, with rhomboid piers and several glass-walled rooms, and there was to be a greenhouse known as a "Bissorum", after Jones's plant-loving daughter Florence (also known as Bisser). Instead of using the Mayan Revival style, as he had in his previous textile-block designs, Wright decided to emphasize the vertical design details of Jones's house, with alternating glass bays and concrete piers. Although Jones liked the original diagonal floor plan, he did not think it was feasible for a residential structure, as he told Wright that June. Wright revised the plans and continued to request additional money from Jones through mid-1929, while Jones was in Europe. By that October, Jones was reluctant to give Wright more money, as he felt that Wright was using the money to fund speculative developments instead of using it to cover his debts.

==== Revised plans and construction ====
Wright re-drew the plans based on a square grid, rather than a hexagonal grid, though he retained the general layout. Jones continued to like the plans, but he was hesitant about the facade's design, saying the concrete piers would obstruct views of Turkey Mountain. Wright responded that the house would have to be redesigned if he were to accommodate the sightlines that Jones wanted. Wright eventually acquiesced to another of Jones's requests, swapping the billiards and dining rooms' positions. The plan also had to be adjusted because Wright's drawings did not fit the site. Wright had assumed that the house would be built on a plateau, but there was a slope at one corner, which meant that the garage and the servant bedrooms above it would be 10 feet (3.0 m) above the ground. Amid the Great Depression, Westhope was one of a small number of Wright designs that were built during the early 1930s.

From the outset, Wright had wanted his cousin to hire Paul Mueller, who had previously built several other Wright–designed structures, (Note: Among them the E-Z Polish Factory, Larkin Administration Building, and Unity Temple) as the Jones House's general contractor. It took several months for Mueller and Wright to agree on an estimated construction cost, but Mueller, who was desperate for work, eventually agreed to take the job. At the time, Jones stipulated that he did not want to spend more than $75,000 on construction, (Note: Equivalent to $1,076,000 in 2024) while Wright was telling Alexander J. Chandler—an Arizona developer with whom he was doing business—that the house would cost about $100,000. (Note: Equivalent to $1,434,000 in 2024) Mueller agreed to a construction budget of $72,500 and moved to Tulsa in July 1930. The construction permit for the house was issued that September, with Mueller hired as the general contractor. Wright was still consulting with Jones to finalize the design details in 1931, at which point the construction budget had risen to $80,000. Mueller designed the concrete blocks, experimenting with the concrete to find a mixture that could resist leaks. At least three types of molds were used to create the blocks: hinged-metal molds for the exterior blocks, and wooden or plaster molds for the interior blocks. The architect Bruce Goff, a young apprentice of Wright's, later noted that the blocks were built in many distinct sizes.

Due to Wright's monetary issues, he did not have a laboratory, so he experimented with design features while working on his clients' houses, using a novel roof design for Jones's house. According to Jenkin, Mueller had used up much of the advance payment from Jones to pay off his debts, and he ran out of money halfway through the project, forcing a temporary halt in construction. One story has it that Mueller came to Jones's office "in tears" when he ran out of money; though Jones agreed not to take action against Mueller, he was forced to spend an additional $20,000 due to the delays. The budget overrun was typical of Wright's projects, and Jones ended up paying over $100,000. The house's walls had been built to the second story by January 1931, and the building was substantially finished by August. By then, Jones was exasperated with the delays, to the point that he was losing interest in the house (a sentiment that several of Wright's California clients had also expressed). Mueller never again built another building for Wright.

=== Jones use ===
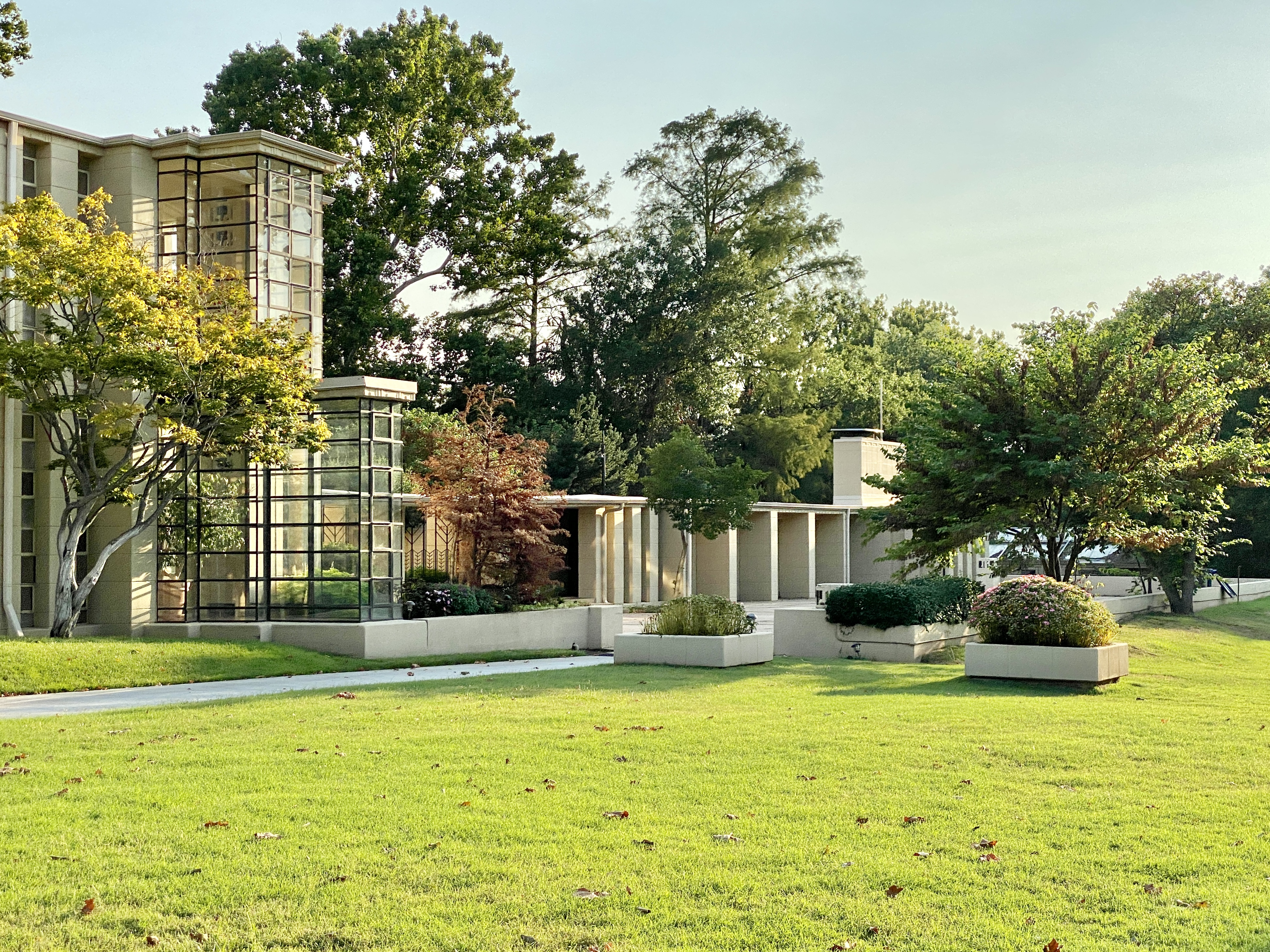
The building seen from its lawn

The completed house was known as Westhope to commemorate Jones's father. The Joneses decorated their house with Asian pieces, including Chinese porcelains and bronzes, as well as a panel salvaged from a Japanese building following the 1923 Great Kantō earthquake. The house is the origin of an oft-repeated anecdote regarding Wright's leaky roofs. According to this anecdote, Jones once called Wright in the middle of a storm to complain that the roof was leaking on his desk, and Wright reportedly replied, "Richard, why don't you move your desk?" Georgia Jones reportedly said in response, "This is what we get for leaving a work of art out in the rain." The journalist Brendan Gill wrote that Jones reportedly liked the house despite the leak, while other sources cite the Jones as having disliked it. Wright had intended for the house to withstand Oklahoma's tornadoes; soon after the house was completed, it reportedly survived a tornado that struck Tulsa.

In the house's early years, the Joneses hosted guests such as the aviator Lewis Yancey, as well as the 1937 wedding of two local residents. The house also hosted meetings for local groups, such as afternoon teas, awards ceremonies for the Tulsa Tribune, and fraternity and sorority meetings. Many events for the Kappa Kappa Gamma sorority were hosted at the house, since Georgia Jones had once been the sorority's nationwide president. Architects also traveled to the house from around the world. By the 1950s, all three of the Jones children had moved away and started their own families, but they often visited their parents.

=== Late 20th century ===
Jones died at his house in 1963. His widow, who had never liked Westhope, sold it to the local architect M. Murray McCune; sources disagree on whether McCune bought Westhope in 1964 or 1965. After acquiring Westhope, McCune renovated it. He installed an air-conditioning system, with ventilation grates patterned after grilles that Wright had originally designed for the house, and he renovated the kitchen as well. McCune told the Tulsa World in 1969 that he often came home from business trips to see people waiting outside his front door, asking for tours of the house. Following advocacy from McCune, the house was added to the National Register of Historic Places in April 1975.

Karen and Don Nelson bought Westhope in 1982 and subsequently renovated it again. The house was sold again c. 1987–1988 to the psychiatrist Dwight Holden, who moved into the house with his wife Sandra, their two daughters, and several pets after seeking to buy a house nearby. According to Holden, visitors frequently passed by the house either because they thought it was a bank or museum, or because they were interested in the house itself. Holden also claimed that the utility costs were expensive and that he had to replace the lights every week because the house had dozens of lightbulbs, which kept malfunctioning. The house was placed for sale in 1992 and was sold the next year to Barbara Tyson, a member of the family that founded Tyson Foods Inc., who restored it. During this decade, the house hosted events such as a 1993 meeting of the National Governors Association, as well as an architectural conference in 1997 which was attended by Wright's grandson Eric Lloyd Wright.

=== 21st century ===
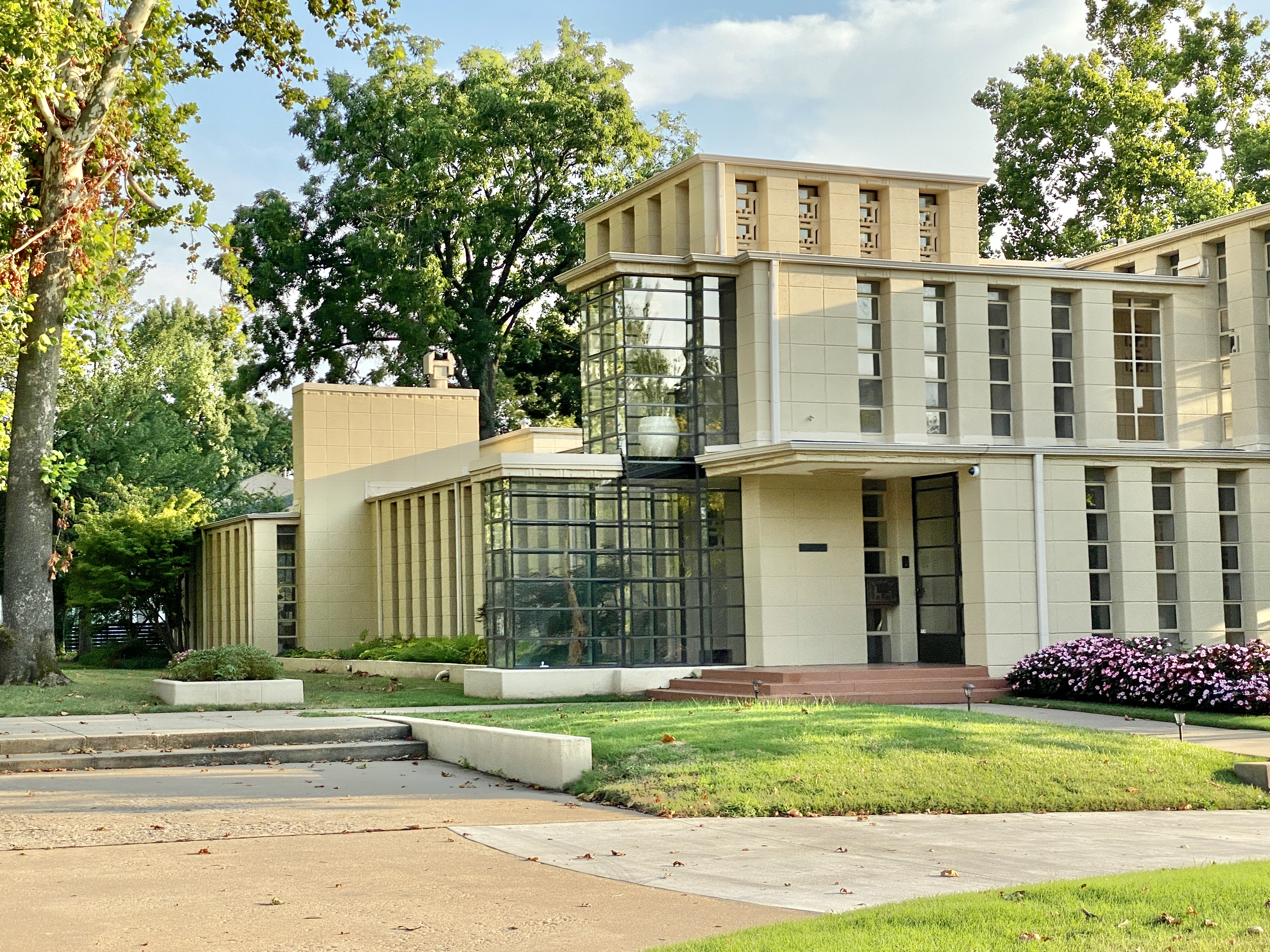
The main entrance

The house was still owned by the Tyson family into the 2010s, and the Tulsa Foundation for Architecture was advocating for the house to be opened to the public at least occasionally. At the time, the house was closed to the public, even though many members of the public wanted to visit it. The owners lived in Arkansas and did not respond to requests from potential visitors. As a result, the preservationist organization Preservation Oklahoma lobbied to add Westhope to its list of the state's most endangered historic sites in 2014. Westhope was again added to Preservation Oklahoma's list of endangered historic sites in 2018.

The structure was purchased in October 2021 by the investor Stuart Price, who paid $2.5 million. Though Price wanted to use Westhope as his personal residence, he continued to live in his previous house instead. At the time, Westhope had been abandoned for several years and needed restoration. Price made extensive renovations including re-waterproofing and tuckpointing cracked blocks. He removed carpeting that had been added to some of the floors, and he repainted the building and redid the landscaping. After Price renovated Westhope, he rented it out for meetings, such as fundraisers for the Tulsa Ballet. The house also hosted private events, such as a dinner that the actress Sophia Bush hosted before her wedding in 2022.

The house was placed for sale in April 2023 for $7.995 million. As soon as the listing was publicized, it attracted large amounts of attention from people around the United States, as well as filming companies that wanted to shoot movies there. Nonetheless, with no buyer for the house forthcoming, Price hired Sotheby's to auction it off in November 2023, before deciding to cancel the planned auction, The house was listed for sale again in April 2024, at which point the real-estate agent halved the asking price to $4.5 million. It was the third-most-expensive house for sale in Tulsa at the time. The house still failed to find a buyer, despite garnering significant attention, and Price again contemplated using the house as his personal residence. In February 2025, Westhope was listed for sale again for $3.5 million. It was sold that November to a billionaire family, Jacob DeWitte and Caroline Cochran, who paid $3.56 million.

== Reception ==
When the house was developed, it was sometimes known as the "glass house" because of its design. Jenkin Lloyd Jones recalled that neighbors were confused as to its design, so Richard told them that it was supposed to be a pickle factory. Royal Cortissoz wrote for the New York Herald Tribune that he felt it was not distinguishable from Wright's other architecture. Both Cortissoz and the journalist Brendan Gill noted that the house had a penitentiary-like feeling, with Gill calling it "a curious structure". Robert C. Twombly characterized the house simply as "disastrously ugly", while Meryle Secrest described Westhope's design as "a mixed achievement", saying that Wright's close relationship with Jones had tainted the quality of the house's design because Wright worked best when left alone. Conversely, the Tulsa World described it as "truly one of Tulsa's greatest landmarks" (along with Tulsa's Art Deco buildings), while The Daily Oklahoman said that the house "keeps alive the expression of Wright's organic architecture". A writer for The Kansas City Star described the house as a "fine example of the Zigzag" architectural style.

Some commentary focused on the designs of the walls. The historian Henry-Russell Hitchcock wrote that the design of the facade did not remotely resemble a traditional wall, calling it "a screen of closely spaced piers between which space flows [...] freely". According to the architectural critic Kenneth Frampton, Wright had dispensed with windowless walls "in favor of an alternating pattern of piers and slots that is as overly solid as it is void". The writer Robert Sweeney wrote that the differences between Westhope and Wright's California houses signified the architect's move toward a design philosophy inspired by the International Style. Jones's daughter Florence was critical of the design, describing its vertical architectural details as unsuitable for the building's size, and saying that the building's design made the interiors more vulnerable to temperature extremes.

== See also ==
- List of Frank Lloyd Wright works
- National Register of Historic Places listings in Tulsa County, Oklahoma
