= Tulsa World =

Daily newspaper in Tulsa, Oklahoma

- Type: Daily newspaper
- Format: Broadsheet
- Owner: Lee Enterprises
- President: Mark Lewis
- Editor: Kristen Wright
- Founded: September 14, 1905; 120 years ago
- Headquarters: 315 S. Boulder Ave. Tulsa, Oklahoma 74103; United States
- Circulation: 33,565 Daily; 36,484 Sunday (as of 2023)
- ISSN: 2330-7234 (print); 2330-7242 (web)
- OCLC number: 4450824
- Website: tulsaworld.com

The Tulsa World is an American daily newspaper. It serves the city of Tulsa, Oklahoma, and is the primary newspaper for the northeastern and eastern portions of Oklahoma. The printed edition is the second-most circulated newspaper in the state, after The Oklahoman.

It was founded in 1905 and locally owned by the Lorton family for almost 100 years until February 2013, when it was sold to BH Media Group, a Berkshire Hathaway company controlled by Warren Buffett. The Tulsa World Media Company became part of Lee Enterprises in 2020. The paper was jointly operated with the Tulsa Tribune from 1941 to 1992.

== History ==
Republican activist James F. McCoy and Kansas journalist J.R. Brady published the first edition of the Tulsa World on September 14, 1905 at the time Brady was starting Tulsa World, he was also publishing the Indian Republican a weekly newspaper, which was previously edited by a con artist named Myron Boyle. Brady had bought the Indian Republican in 1905 and fired Boyle in the following year. Boyle borrowed $500 from Dr. S. G. Kennedy, ostensibly to pay some personal debts. Instead, he left town without repaying Dr. Kennedy.

Brady was sufficiently successful establishing the Tulsa World that it attracted a Missouri mine owner, George Bayne, and his brother-in-law, Charles Dent, who bought and ran the paper for the next five years. In 1911, Eugene Lorton, who had just sold his stake in a Walla Walla, Washington newspaper, and moved to Tulsa, bought an interest in the Tulsa World, becoming its editor, and then, with financial backing from Harry Ford Sinclair, the sole owner and publisher in 1917.

Beginning in 1915, the Tulsa World fought an editorial battle advocating a proposal to build a reservoir on Spavinaw Creek and pipe the water 55 miles to Tulsa. Charles Page was among those who opposed the Spavinaw plan; he advocated a plan in his own newspaper to sell water from the Shell Creek water system, which Page owned. Page's newspaper, the Morning News, closed in 1919 after Tulsans approved a bond issue to pipe the water from Spavinaw. He sold a companion paper, Tulsa Democrat, to Richard Lloyd Jones, who renamed it the Tulsa Tribune.

In the 1920s, the Tulsa World was known for its opposition to the Ku Klux Klan, which had risen to local prominence in the wake of the Tulsa race massacre in the spring of 1921. Lorton was active in Republican Party politics until he was defeated by William B. Pine, in the 1924 primary election for the US Senate; Pine went on to win the general election. Lorton then supported Democrats Alfred E. Smith in the 1928 Presidential election and Franklin D. Roosevelt in 1932 and 1936. However, Lorton refused to support Roosevelt's third term bid in 1940; he returned to the Republicans and remained a GOP supporter for the rest of his life.

The Tulsa Tribune and Tulsa World entered a joint operating agreement in June 1941. Eugene Lorton died in 1949, leaving majority interest in the newspaper to his wife Maude and smaller shares to four daughters and 20 employees. Eugene's presumed successor, Robert Lorton, had died at age 24 in 1939. In the 1950s, Maude Lorton transferred one-fourth of the company to attorney Byron Boone, who became publisher in 1959. Upon her death, she left the rest of her shares to her grandson Robert. In 1964, Robert Lorton became director of the News Publishing Corporation, which oversaw the non-editorial operations of both the Tulsa Tribune and Tulsa World. In 1968, he became president of the Tulsa World and publisher upon Boone's death in 1988. The Tulsa Tribune ceased operations in 1992 and Tulsa World acquired its assets. Robert Lorton reacquired the World's outstanding shares and made the newspaper entirely family-owned once again. In May 2005, he passed the title of publisher to his son Robert E. Lorton III. During the same year, World Publishing Company had 700 employees, and was ranked as one of Oklahoma's largest employers.

In February 2013, the paper announced that it would be sold to Berkshire Hathaway's BH Media Group, controlled by Warren Buffett. In 2015, BH Media bought six weekly papers and the daily Tulsa Business & Legal News from Community Publishers Inc.

On April 20, 2015, four Tulsa World journalists—including two nominated for the Pulitzer Prize—suddenly resigned their jobs to accept positions at The Frontier, a new online-only publication launched by the former World publisher, Bobby Lorton.

In 2016, the World announced it would not endorse any candidate in the 2016 election, saying that the American people had been presented with "the least acceptable list of candidates for president in modern times." The paper had maintained its loyalty to the GOP after Eugene Lorton's death; it had endorsed the GOP standardbearer in every election since 1940.

In November 2025, the World moved to a six day printing schedule, eliminating its printed Monday edition.

== Recent developments ==
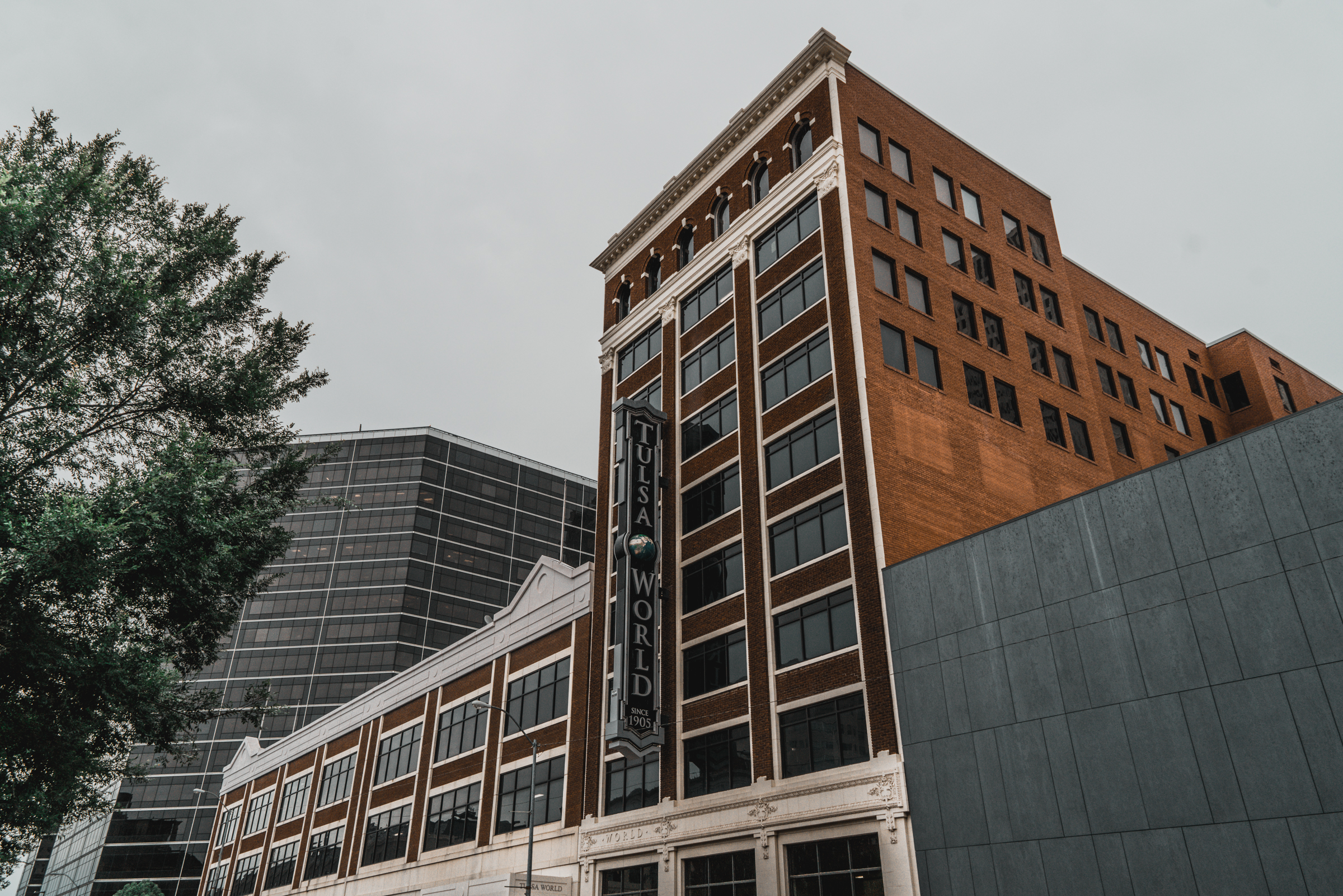
Tulsa World's headquarters are located in downtown Tulsa.

In February 2013, the paper announced that it would be sold to Berkshire Hathaway's BH Media Group, controlled by Warren Buffett. Lee Enterprises announced an agreement to buy BH Media Group publications and The Buffalo News for $140 million cash on January 29, 2020. The acquisition includes the Tulsa World.

As of September 2012, weekday circulation was 95,003; Saturday circulation was 104,602; and Sunday circulation was 133,066. In April 2011, the World introduced a metered model to its digital products that limits the amount of locally produced articles that a non-subscriber can view at no charge. Once viewers have opened 5 stories in 30 days, they will be asked to purchase a subscription. The home page, all section pages, classifieds and most syndicated content is unrestricted to all readers. "In reality, more people are engaged with our content than ever before. But it no longer seems fair to have a portion of our readers pay for our content while others do not. Therefore, like many publications, we have decided to charge a fee for our digital content. Print subscribers will continue to receive unlimited access to our digital products," wrote then publisher and CEO Robert E. Lorton III in a letter to readers In March 2008, the World closed its zoned suburban newspapers, called the "Community World," and laid off its 18 staff members. Tulsa World laid off 28 employees in early 2009. Twenty-six newsroom employees were terminated immediately. Editors said in a memo that staff members would be challenged to produce a quality product after the layoffs, and editors asked remaining newsroom employees to take on new duties. On March 29, 2009, the World published a column by its then publisher, Robert E. Lorton III, responding to what Lorton called "an unusual amount of concerned correspondence in regard to the future of this company and our industry." Lorton asserted that despite the difficult economy and general downward trends in the newspaper industry and the World's own staff cuts, that Tulsa World remains profitable and has a healthy capital structure. The World further reduced staff on March 1, 2011 by terminating eighteen employees, "the result of a company-wide evaluation by management of operational efficiencies." The World says "the reduction represents approximately 3 percent of its staff."

Also in January 2009, the Tulsa World and Oklahoma City's daily newspaper, The Oklahoman, announced a content-sharing agreement in which each paper would carry some content created by the other. The papers also said they would "focus on reducing some areas of duplication, such as sending reporters from both The Oklahoman and Tulsa World to cover routine news events."

In mid-January 2009, Tulsa World filed a libel lawsuit against noted local blogger Michael Bates, Urban Tulsa Weekly, and the Weekly's editor and publisher, over a column Bates wrote for the weekly paper, in which Bates expressed doubts about the World's circulation numbers based on a 2006 report by the Audit Bureau of Circulation. On January 20, The Tulsa World said it would drop the case against Urban Tulsa Weekly and its editor and publisher, after the weekly paper agreed to issue a retraction, but Bates remained a defendant. Tulsa World's decision to sue a competitor paper was criticized in a column by Slate editor Jack Shafer. On February 12, 2009, the World reported that Bates had issued an apology and retraction, and that the libel lawsuit had been settled on confidential terms.

== Notable staff ==
- Mildred Ladner Thompson, former Tulsa World book editor and columnist
