= Tulsa Tribune =

American daily newspaper (1919–1992)

- Tulsa Tribune Building
- U.S. National Register of Historic Places
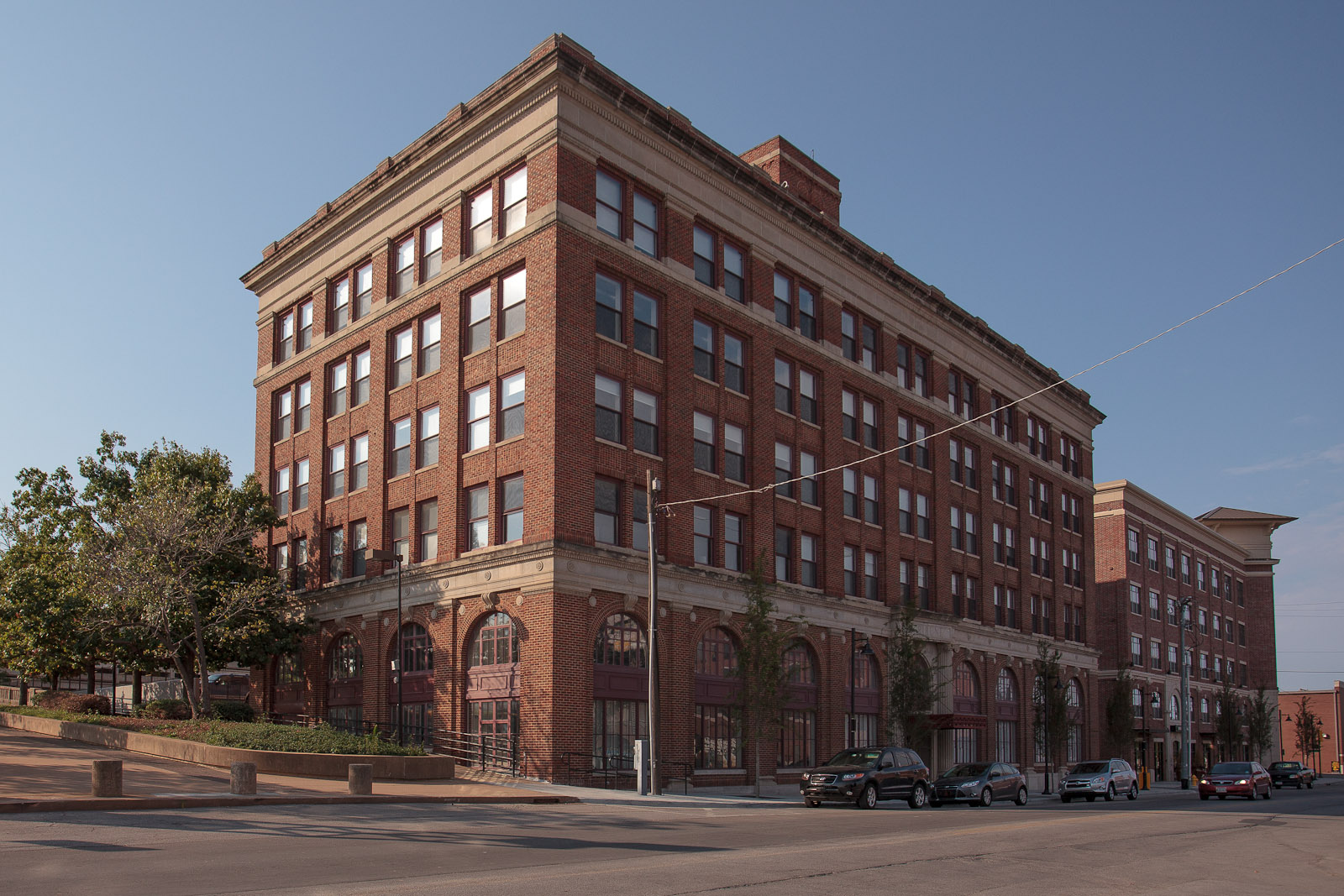
- Tribune Building in 2012
- Location: 20 East Archer Street; Tulsa, Oklahoma
- Built: 1924
- NRHP reference No.: 79003644
- Added to NRHP: July 16, 1979

Tulsa Tribune
- Type: Daily newspaper
- Owner(s): Richard Lloyd Jones Sr., Jenkin Lloyd Jones, Richard Lloyd Jones Jr.
- Founder: Richard Lloyd Jones Sr.
- Publisher: Richard Lloyd Jones Sr.
- Editor: Richard Lloyd Jones Sr., Jenkin Lloyd Jones Sr., Jenkin Lloyd Jones Jr.
- Launched: 1919
- Ceased publication: 1992
- Political alignment: Conservative
- Language: English
- Headquarters: Tulsa, Oklahoma

The Tulsa Tribune was an afternoon daily newspaper published in Tulsa, Oklahoma from 1919 to 1992. Owned and run by three generations of the Jones family, the Tribune closed in 1992 after the termination of its joint operating agreement with the morning Tulsa World.

== History ==
=== Antecedents ===
In 1895, a group of Tulsans established a publication called The New Era, intended to convey a more positive image of the then-small town than that found in the existing paper, The Indian Republican. Supporters of Democratic Party leader William Jennings Bryan, they changed the name of The New Era to The Democrat in 1898. The paper was unprofitable and the publisher, R. L. Lunsford, sold it to Dave Jesse, who established the Tulsa Democrat as a daily in 1904, and sold it to William Stryker in 1905. Stryker sold the paper in 1916 (or 1915) to Charles Page, founder of the neighboring city of Sand Springs, who used the newspaper to promote his plan for the city of Tulsa to obtain its water from Shell Creek, near Sand Springs, rather than from Spavinaw in eastern Oklahoma.

=== Richard Lloyd Jones ===
In November 1919, the Tulsa Democrat had 21,682 subscribers. In December 1919, Page sold the newspaper to Richard Lloyd Jones, who had previously owned the Wisconsin State Journal in Madison, Wisconsin. Jones changed the paper's name to Tulsa Tribune-Democrat; then, on January 19, 1920, he changed it again, to Tulsa Tribune. As foreshadowed by this name change, the Tribune became a consistently Republican paper; it never endorsed a Democrat for U.S. president, and did not endorse a Democrat for governor until 1958.

Richard Lloyd Jones (April 14, 1873 – December 4, 1963) was the son of an influential Unitarian minister, Jenkin Lloyd Jones. He co-founded Tulsa's All Souls Unitarian Church, now one of the largest Unitarian Universalist churches in the world. Jones commissioned his cousin, Frank Lloyd Wright, to build him a house in Tulsa; constructed in 1929, it is known as Westhope and listed on the National Register of Historic Places.

=== Tulsa race massacre ===
The May 31, 1921 edition of the Tribune included an inflammatory front-page story entitled "Nab Negro for Attacking Girl in Elevator", about an encounter between a white elevator operator and a black teenager, Dick Rowland. The Tribune's story is frequently named as a contributing factor in the Tulsa race massacre that broke out on June 1, 1921 and led to the destruction of the then-prosperous African-American Greenwood business district. It has been claimed that the same issue of the Tribune also contained a second article, or an editorial, reporting on plans by white residents to lynch Rowland. All originals of this edition of the newspaper were apparently destroyed, and the relevant pages are also missing from the microfilm copy.

The Tribune was also known for its opposition to Oklahoma Governor Jack C. Walton, who in 1923 declared martial law as part of his efforts to investigate the Ku Klux Klan. Walton later placed a censor at the Tribune offices after it ran an advertisement encouraging Klan members to resist his declaration. Walton was ultimately impeached and removed from office for his declaration of absolute martial law, which forwent habeas corpus, illegal in the Oklahoma constitution.

=== Later years ===
William P. Steven, who would become a notable American news executive, joined the Tulsa Tribune in 1930 as a cub reporter. In 1937, he was named as managing editor of the paper. He continued to work in Tulsa until 1941, when he was appointed to the United States Office of Censorship.

In 1941 the Tribune entered into a joint operating agreement with the morning Tulsa World and established the Newspaper Printing Corporation. The two papers co-existed, sharing their advertising, printing and circulation departments, until 1992.

Richard Lloyd Jones passed on control of the newspaper to his sons, Richard Lloyd Jones Jr. (February 22, 1909 – January 27, 1982) and Jenkin Lloyd Jones Sr. – February 24, 2004. In 1984 the Tribune's corporate owner merged with Swab-Fox Companies Inc., a diversified energy and real estate firm.

Jenkin Lloyd Jones Sr. was editor of the Tribune from 1941 to 1988, and publisher until 1991. A number of other Jones family members served in different business and editorial capacities on the paper, including Jenkin's son, Jenkin Lloyd Jones Jr., who was the last publisher and editor of the paper.

In 1974 Lilian Newby, a 31 year old reporter for the Tribune, was credited with the passage of a shield law in Oklahoma.

=== Closing ===
By 1992, the Tribune's circulation was about 67,000, as compared the 128,000 daily circulation (238,000 on Sunday) of its competitor, the morning World. The papers had renegotiated their joint operating agreement in 1981, and it was due to expire in 1996. The Tribune had introduced a redesigned paper in October 1991 and was believed to be profitable, but negotiations for an extension of the joint operating agreement led instead to the World's July 31, 1992 announcement that it would not renew the agreement, and the Tribune's announcement that it would close down, part of a nationwide trend away from afternoon newspapers. The World paid the Tribune Company owner about $30 million for its share of the Newspaper Printing Corporation and other assets. The Tribune printed its last edition on September 30, 1992.

== Notable staff ==
In addition to his positions at the Tribune, Jenkin Lloyd Jones Sr. was a syndicated columnist whose column was carried in as many as 150 newspapers. He was president of the American Society of Newspaper Editors in 1956, and president of the United States Chamber of Commerce in 1969.

Joseph A. Brandt was the city editor of the Tribune in the 1920s before moving into academia as head of the University of Oklahoma Press and Princeton University Press (and, briefly, as President of the University of Oklahoma). William P. Steven, who later held senior editor positions with the Minneapolis Star and Tribune, Houston Chronicle, and Chicago Daily News and Sun-Times, began his career with the Tulsa Tribune in 1930 and served as managing editor from 1937 to 1941, before moving to the newly formed Office of Censorship. Other notable authors who worked at the Tulsa Tribune at some point in their careers included humorist H. Allen Smith, war correspondent Jim G. Lucas, science writer Martin Gardner, and sportswriter Mike Sowell. While working for the Tulsa Tribune at the age of 19, Heather Langenkamp appeared as an extra in the Francis Ford Coppola productions The Outsiders (1983) and Rumble Fish (1983) before going on to star in the A Nightmare on Elm Street franchise as Nancy Thompson.

== Tribune Building ==
The Tribune Building, at 20 East Archer Street, was built in 1924 and housed the Tribune until 1942. It was the first building in Oklahoma built as a newspaper plant. It subsequently served as a storage facility and as a mission for the homeless. The building lay largely vacant from 1971 until 2001, when it was renovated and converted into loft apartments under the name Tribune Lofts. The building was listed in the National Register of Historic Places under Criteria A and C on July 16, 1979. Its NRIS number is 79003644.
