= Jenkin Lloyd Jones =

American Unitarian minister (1843–1918)

- Born: November 14, 1843; Cardiganshire, Wales
- Died: September 12, 1918 (aged 74); Tower Hill, Wisconsin, U.S.
- Education: Meadville Theological Seminary
- Spouses: Susan Barber; Edith Lackersteen
- Children: Richard Lloyd Jones, Mary Jones
- Parent(s): Richard Lloyd Jones, Mary Thomas James
- Relatives: Richard Lloyd Jones (son); Jenkin Lloyd Jones Sr. (grandson); Frank Lloyd Wright (nephew)
- Church: All Souls Unitarian Church - Chicago, Illinois
- Ordained: 1870

Jenkin Lloyd Jones (November 14, 1843 – September 12, 1918) was a prominent American Unitarian minister. He founded All Souls Unitarian Church in Chicago, Illinois, as well as its community outreach organization, the Abraham Lincoln Centre. He was a founder and long-time editor of Unity, a liberal religious magazine. He tried to move Unitarianism away from a strictly Christian focus, aligning himself with a group of radical Midwestern ministers known as the "Unity Men" who stressed a creedless "ethical basis" as the common element for churches. At the end of his life, Jones was an outspoken pacifist opposed to U.S. involvement in World War I.

== Early life ==
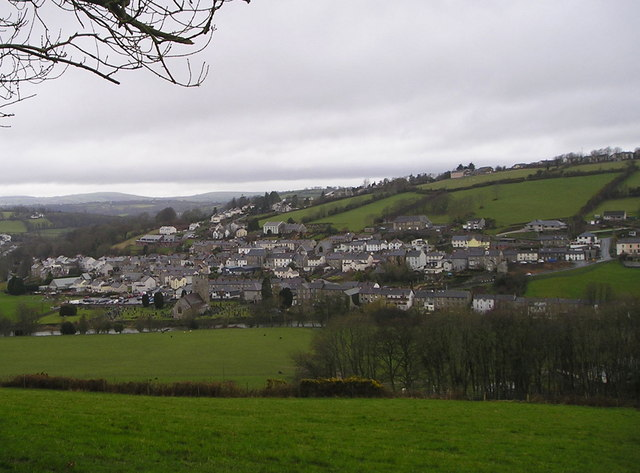
A view of Llandysul, once a hotbed of Welsh Unitarianism

Jenkin Lloyd Jones was born near Llandysul, a farming town in Cardiganshire, Wales. He was the seventh of ten children of Richard Lloyd Jones and Mary Thomas James. In 1844 the family emigrated, first to Canada, and then to Ixonia, Wisconsin, where they were initially supported by Richard's brother. The Jones family was descended from a long line of dissenting Arminian ministers. Jenkin received his early religious and secular education at home. After ten years, Richard and his family moved to Spring Green, Wisconsin.

== Civil War service and its influence ==
Jones, often called "Jenk", enlisted in 1862 in the 6th Battery of the Wisconsin Volunteer Army. His military service included the battles of Vicksburg, Missionary Ridge, Chattanooga, Lookout Mountain and Atlanta. He suffered a broken foot at Missionary Ridge that required him to walk with a cane for the rest of his life. His Civil War experiences turned him into a committed pacifist; he was convinced that people must find another way to settle their differences.

After he was mustered out of the army, he returned to the family farm in Wisconsin. He soon told his family that he'd had a religious experience and decided to study for the ministry. In 1866 he enrolled in the Meadville Theological Seminary in Meadville, Pennsylvania, a Unitarian institution that later became part of Meadville Lombard Theological School. Many of his classmates were also Civil War veterans, and he became a class leader. He examined the implications of the theory of evolution on ideas about God in his commencement paper, "Theological Bearings of Development Theory."

== Marriage and family ==
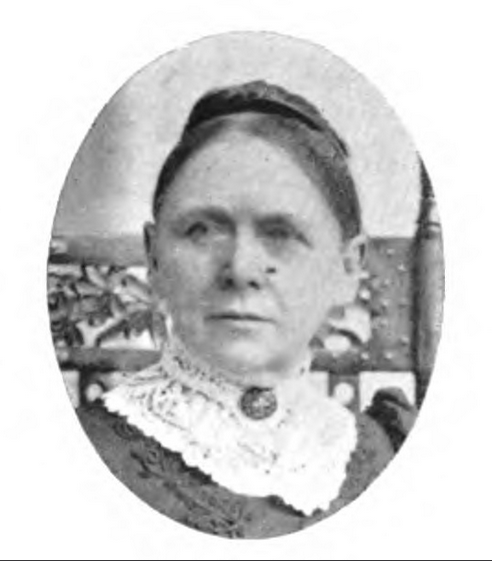
Susan Charlotte Barber Jones

Susan Charlotte Barber was born May 15, 1832, in New York as the eldest daughter of English immigrants, John Barber and Susan Cartwright. The Cartwrights were Unitarians and had moved to Meadville seeking a like-minded community. Susan studied informally at the Meadville Theological Seminary while working as secretary to the founder, Harm Jan Huidekoper, and his son, Professor Frederic Huidekoper.

Susan met Jenkin while he was a student at the seminary. They married after he graduated in 1870, and spent their honeymoon in Cleveland, Ohio at the annual meeting of the Western Unitarian Conference (WUC). The couple then returned to Spring Green. They had two children: Mary and Richard Lloyd Jones; Richard would go on to a successful newspaper career, eventually publishing the Tulsa Tribune.

== Career as a Unitarian minister ==
=== Missionary work ===
Jones obtained his first ministry in 1870 at the Liberal Christian Church in Winnetka, Illinois, where he was ordained. However, he resigned this position in less than a year because he felt it too limiting. He returned to Wisconsin to become a traveling missionary. As such, he founded churches in Racine, Madison, Baraboo, and Whitewater. He also worked with the First Independent Society of Liberal Christians in Janesville.

In 1875, the WUC hired Jones part-time as Missionary Secretary. He travelled extensively, going as far as California. His work included finding ministers to fill vacant pulpits and attending conferences, installations, ordinations and dedications. In 1876 he became Corresponding Secretary of the WUC and liaison to the American Unitarian Association (AUA). In 1878 he was one of the founders of Unity magazine, a semimonthly publication that was called "the voice of the more radical Unitarians of the West". The ministers affiliated with the magazine were labeled the "Unity Men". In April 1880, Jones was named Unity's editor and held the post for the rest of his life.

The combination of missionary work and pastoral and editorial duties caused health problems for Jones, so he decided to quit his missionary work in 1880. Instead, the WUC made the Missionary Secretary a full-time position. Jones resigned the Janesville pastorate and retained his WUC job. He and his family moved to the new WUC headquarters in Chicago.

He was an effective advocate for the WUC. He increased its number of congregations from 43 to 87 by reaching out to recent Northern European immigrants as well as to transplanted New Englanders. He advanced what has been described as a humanist strain in Midwestern Unitarianism. He was "a professed theist and Christian who fellowshipped and labored with persons of good will regardless of their faith. He had no use for traditional creeds. Even when he preached on Gospel texts, his emphasis was on the ethical, not the supernatural."

=== All Souls Church (Chicago) ===
The Jones family travelled to Wales in 1882, where Jenk preached and visited with family members and other Unitarians. After they returned to Chicago, he met with a dozen members of the nearly defunct Fourth Unitarian Church. In November 1882, he began preaching every Sunday in that small church, and the congregation steadily grew. When it reached 66 members, he gave what came to be known as his "All Souls Are Mine" sermon, which included this excerpt:

With your help and cooperation, we will start here a new church, to be the Church of All Souls. I shall ask no church subscriptions of you until the worth of the church shall be proved to you. I shall invite you to give as your impulse directs to the Sunday collection basket. Out of that I shall pay all the church bills, and if there be money left I shall accept it as my salary.

As Samuel Eliot writes, "On that basis he [Jones] made a go of it, and when he died he was the oldest settled minister of any denomination in Chicago." In 1884, Jones resigned his position with the WUC to serve the rest of his life as minister of All Souls Church.

In 1895, the church bought land for a new building that would house both the church and its related social services. The latter included a gymnasium, classrooms, library and reading rooms. This building was completed in 1905 and named the Abraham Lincoln Centre.

=== Peace advocacy ===
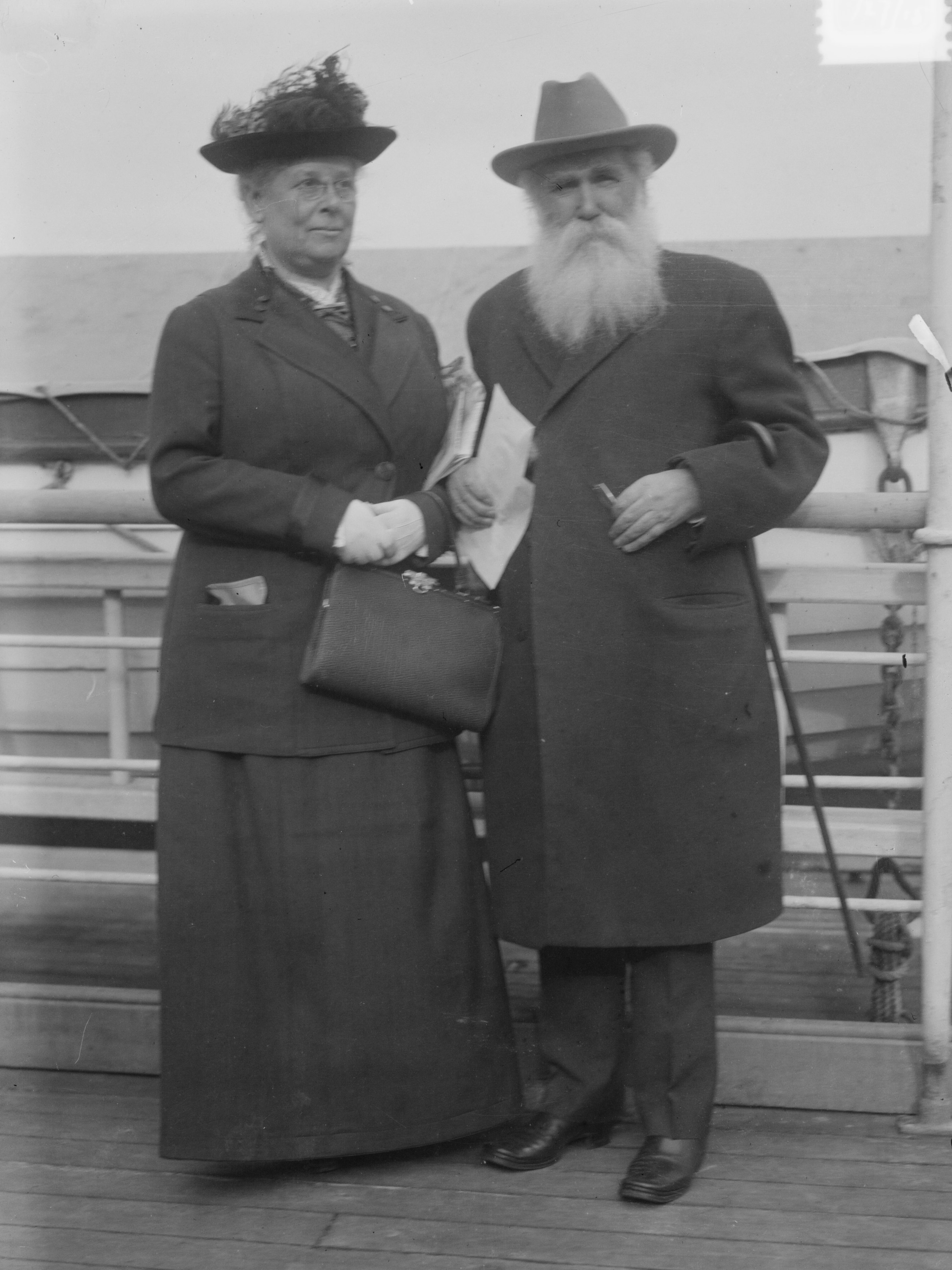
Jones with his second wife in 1915

At the turn of the twentieth century, most Unitarians were peace advocates. Although Jones had served in the Civil War and believed that the ending of slavery was a positive outcome, he also believed that war was a bad thing. This caused him to preach openly against the Spanish–American War and the subsequent American intervention in the Philippines.

In 1915, Henry Ford sponsored an international conference in Stockholm. He chartered a ship, thereafter referred to as the Henry Ford Peace Ship, to bring a large delegation of American peace activists to the conference. Jones was one of this delegation. The conference failed to stop the war and was largely discredited in the American press. Support for the war grew until the United States joined the conflict in 1917. The Chicago Peace Society did not speak out against the war, angering Jones to the point of withdrawing his membership.

He continued to publicly oppose the war, both in speaking and writing. In 1918, Chicago's postmaster, citing the Emergency Act of 1917, prohibited the mailing of Unity. Jones petitioned to have the suspension lifted. This was granted shortly before his death.

== Later years ==
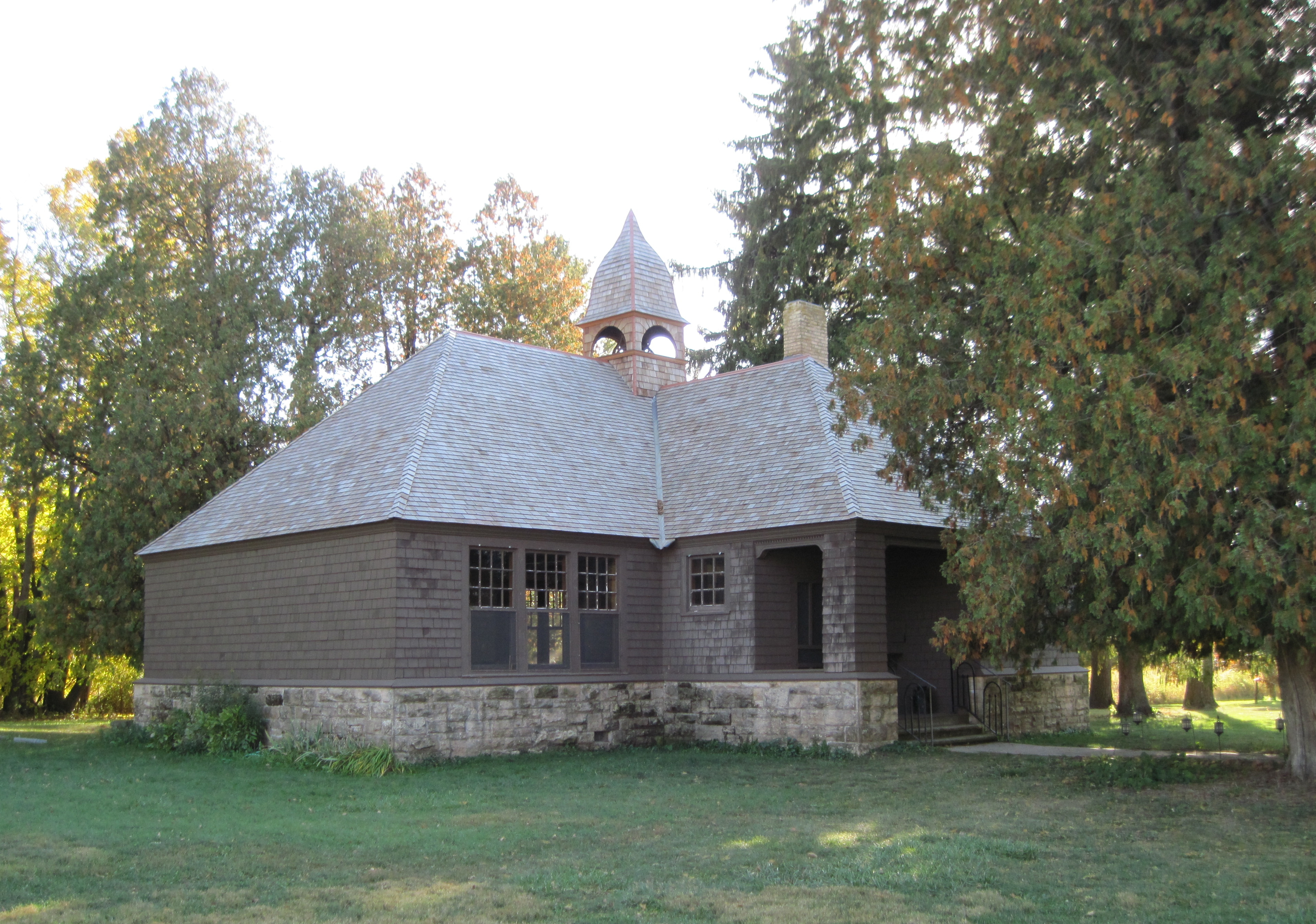
Unity Chapel, Jones's burial place in Wyoming, Wisconsin

His wife Susan's health began to decline in the mid-1890s. She suffered from hearing loss and severe headaches, which prevented her from participating in Jenk's work. Susan died of appendicitis in 1911.

In 1915, Jones married Mrs. Edith Lackersteen, a long-time co-worker at the Abraham Lincoln Centre.

Jones died on September 12, 1918, in Tower Hill, Wisconsin. An obituary listed the cause of death as "shock following an operation". His body was interred in the churchyard of Unity Chapel in the town of Wyoming, Wisconsin.
