= Charles Page =

American philanthropist

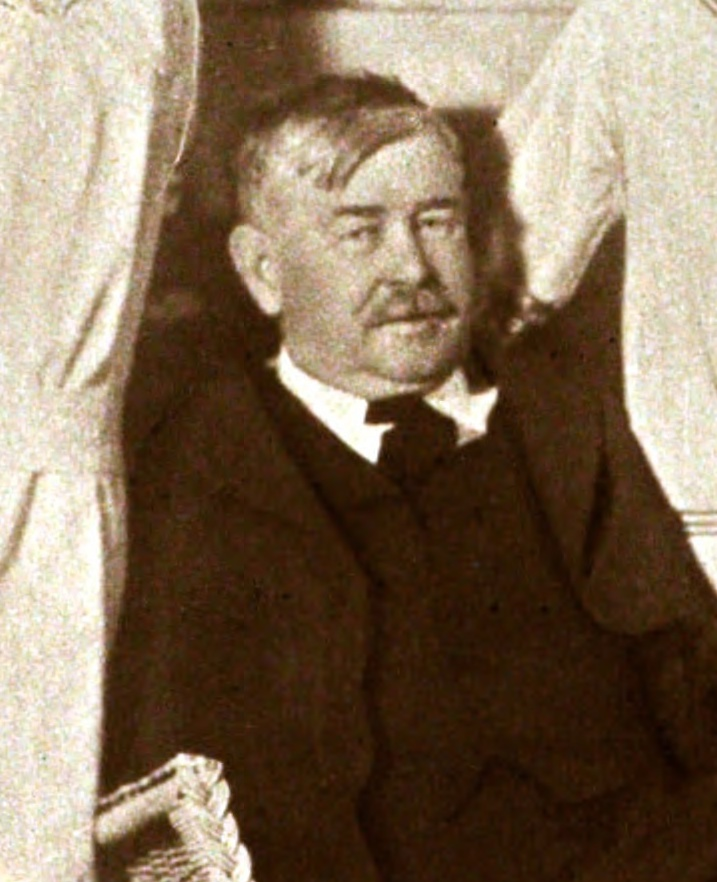
- Page circa 1925
- Born: Charles E. Page; June 2, 1860; Arnott, Wisconsin, U.S.
- Died: December 27, 1926 (aged 66); Sand Springs, Oklahoma, U.S.
- Occupation: Businessman
- Known for: Founder of Sand Springs, Oklahoma
- Spouses: Lucy (m. 1881–1905) Lucile Rayburn (m. 1909)
- Children: 2 (adopted)

Charles Page (June 2, 1860 – December 27, 1926) was a businessman and philanthropist in the early history of Tulsa, Oklahoma. After his father died when Page was an 11-year-old boy in Wisconsin, he left school early to try to help support his mother and siblings. He had years of struggle before succeeding in business and striking oil in 1905 in Oklahoma.

Wanting to help other widows and children, in 1911 Page founded the Sand Springs Home. Concurrently, he founded the city of Sand Springs, Oklahoma as a model community to support the home, attracting industry and businesses. In 1987 he was posthumously inducted into the Tulsa Hall of Fame.

== Early life and family ==
Charles Page was born on June 2 in 1860 or 1861 in Arnott, Wisconsin, near Stevens Point, to James William and Mary (Gottrey) Page. (Note: The Encyclopedia of Oklahoma History and Culture gives his birth year as 1861, while biographer Opal Clark gives 1860.) His mother's family were German and immigrated from Alsace in the 1830s. His father was an American of Scottish and French descent. He was one of eight children and his oldest brother, William, died fighting in the American Civil War. After the war, the family moved to Stevens Point so the children could attend school.

He dropped out of school in 1870 and began working on a freight wagon after his father became too ill to work and his father died in 1871. Thereafter, he took care of his mother and four younger siblings. For many years, Page worked at a series of jobs in an attempt to support his family. In the early 1870s, he helped his mother cook for Wisconsin Central Railway workers. Additionally, he clerked in a general store. In 1876–1877, he worked as a lumberjack and logger. In 1879, he became a policeman in Ashland, Wisconsin.

In 1880, he moved to Tower, Minnesota, to become the chief of police for the company town run by Charlemagne Tower. His main duties involved repressing the local labor movement and he left the town by 1883. He later went to work for the Pinkerton National Detective Agency for most of the rest of the 1880s.

He married his first wife, Lucy, in Duluth, Minnesota in 1881. She already had a son named Willie, whom Page adopted. The family moved to Ellensburg, Washington by 1887 where he ran a saloon and was a colonization agent for Northern Pacific Railway. He later moved to Tacoma where he started a lumber and construction company. After his wife had a stillbirth, he sold the construction business to buy a hotel in Tacoma. In 1891, he moved back to Wisconsin to take care of his dying mother while his family stayed in Washington.

From 1888 to 1890, Page went to Canada searching for gold. He lost all his savings in the Panic of 1893. In 1895, he joined the Cripple Creek Gold Rush. He then moved to Victoria, British Columbia for four to five years. In 1900 he moved to Colorado Springs, Colorado, where he developed a subdivision. He then moved to Boulder and Fort Collins where he began drilling for oil. He moved to Battle Creek, Michigan, to take his wife to the sanatorium there. While oil drilling in Michigan, he heard of the discovery of oil in Oklahoma and Indian Territory.

== Move to Oklahoma ==
In 1901 Charles moved to Oklahoma City, Oklahoma Territory. His wife, then ill with cancer, moved to Hot Springs, Arkansas, hoping to be cured by spring waters. His adoptive son moved to San Franscico and became a dentist. He lived there until 1903, when he moved to Tulsa, then a boom town in Indian Territory. Page bought a hotel and began an independent oil drilling operation. His initial wells were unsuccessful. His first wife died on May 30, 1905, in Hot Springs.

In 1905 his well named "The Taneha" began producing 2,000 barrels per day. Its success helped Page make his first million dollars. Another of his wells hit natural gas in the Glenn Pool Oil Reserve.

=== Founding of Sand Springs ===
In 1908, he purchased a Muscogee allotment to the west of Tulsa from the Adams family. The land had been allotted from the Muscogee Nation to Thomas Adams, a Confederate veteran, and his son Sam Adams sold the allotment to Page. Soon, he acquired adjoining properties. On this land, he eventually founded a town that he named Sand Springs. He used part of the land to found and build the Sand Springs Home and helped establish various schools in West Tulsa, including Berryhill.

A generous philanthropist, he contributed to various charities in Tulsa including the Salvation Army. He quickly formed a friendship with the Tulsa Salvation Army captain, Brinton F. Breeding, and soon persuaded him to work in developing the land for the envisioned orphanage.

In May 1909, Page rescued 21 orphans from a bankrupt orphanage in Tulsa and put Breeding in charge of a home for them. Thereafter, he referred to the orphans as his "kids", and they referred to him as "Dad." The children were not allowed to be adopted. Breeding served as superintendent of the Home until 1948.

On July 22, 1909, Page married his second wife, Lucile Rayburn, in Denver, Colorado. They returned to Tulsa, where he had built a house at Third Street and Olympia Avenue. In 1912, they adopted a baby girl named Mary Ann. In 1915, the family moved to a new home at 810 N Main Avenue in Sand Springs.

Page continually campaigned to attract companies to move to Sand Springs in order to provide jobs in the community for his "kids". Industries in early Sand Springs included: Sheffield Steel, Kerr Glass Company, Southwestern porcelain, Commander Mills (a cotton mill), and Sinclair Prairie Refinery.

=== Tommy Atkins allotment ===
One of the more valuable oil leases in northeastern Oklahoma was for the Tommy Atkins allotment. Three different women claimed Tommy Atkins was deceased and they were his mother, one man claimed to be Atkins, and the Muscogee Nation argued there was never a Tommy Atkins, leading to litigation over the ownership of the allotment. Page paid Sadie James, a descendant of Cherokee Freedmen who claimed to know Tommy's real mother, $3,000 to find the allotment's owner. When James found Atkins mother, Minnie Atkins, she claimed she never had a son named Tommy. Page had his secretary forge documents showing Atkins was Tommy's mother and pressured her into supporting his claim to the allotment. Page eventually won the litigation and rights to the oil lease.

In 1917, James accused Page of bribery and paying her $50 for sex. The Tulsa World, which was generally critical of Page, called the allegations "not fit for print," while Page's publication called the allegations a malicious lie.

=== Involvement in Tulsa ===
Page supported the defense of Industrial Workers of the World member Charles Krieger during his trial for the bombing of Tulsa oilman J. Edgar Pew's home in 1917, likely due to Eugene Lorton's newspapers support of Krieger's guilt. Eugene Lyons claimed Page said he had sent armed men to the courthouse during the trial to prevent Krieger from being shot. Krieger was eventually acquitted in 1920.

==== Shell Creek ====
Page owned the Sand Springs Bottling Company, which was the dominant supplier of fresh water for domestic consumption. By 1920, he had built a dam on Shell Creek, which created Shell Lake, near Sand Springs. He proposed to sell fresh water to the city of Tulsa. His proposal competed with the alternative of building a dam on Spavinaw Creek. Heated competition ensued between the two major newspapers, Tulsa Democrat (owned by Page), which supported the Shell Creek proposal, and the Tulsa World (owned by Eugene Lorton), which supported the Spavinaw plan. Page's proposal was rejected when tests showed that the quantity of water he could produce at Shell Creek was inadequate to meet Tulsa's expected needs.

==== Tulsa Race Massacre Aftermath ====
Many Black families spent the winter of 1921–1922 in tents as they worked to rebuild. Charles Page was commended for his philanthropic efforts in the wake of the riot in the assistance of 'destitute people of color. He donated land and lumber so that black families could build homes in Sand Springs, helping them rebuild their lives in the wake of the Tulsa Race Massacre that occurred May 31 - June 3, 1921. He also took in abandoned children into his orphanage whose parents were killed. He spent the last years of his life trying to help give African-Americans who relocated to Sand Springs, Oklahoma a place free from the Ku Klux Klan which was in every facet of Tulsa government at that time.

== Death and legacy ==
Page died of influenza on December 27, 1926. Charles (followed by his wife Lucile Page) was entombed at Woodland Cemetery in Sand Springs.

The main street of Sand Springs was named "Charles Page Boulevard" in his honor. This street connects Sand Springs to Tulsa, where it becomes West Third Street.

In the town's center, a statue of Page was installed. The Sand Springs Home continues to help families and children in the 21st century. The local high school is named Charles Page High School in his honor. There are also a park and a library named for him in Sand Springs.

In 1987, Page was posthumously inducted into Tulsa's Hall of Fame.

== Works cited ==
- Cobb, Russell (2024). Ghost of Crook County: An Oil Fortune, A Phantom Child, and the Fight For Indigenous Land. Boston: Beacon Press. ISBN 9780807007372.
- Clark, Opal. (1992). A Fool's Enterprise: The Life of Charles Page (Revised ed.). Sand Springs, Oklahoma: Dexter Publishing Company.
