= Timeline of Tulsa, Oklahoma =

Coordinates: 36.131°N 95.937°W

The following is a timeline of the history of the city of Tulsa, Oklahoma, United States.

== 19th century ==
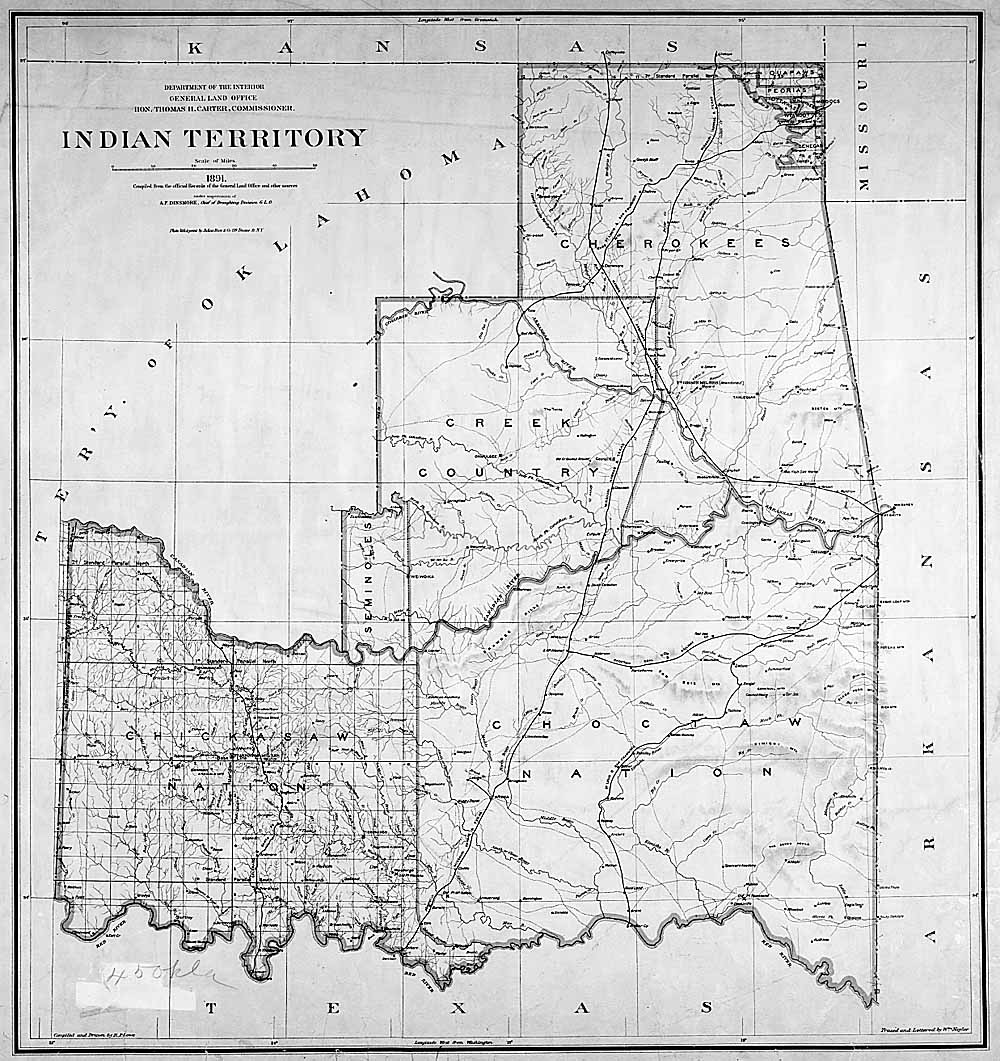
Indian Territory, Eastern part of present-day Oklahoma.

- 1836 – Creek people begin to settle the town of Tulasi after their expulsion from the Southeastern United States.
- 1861 – Battle of Round Mountain and Battle of Chusto-Talasah – Civil War battles occur north of Tulsa.
- March 25, 1879 – First post office established at Perryman ranch.
- 1882 –
  - Atlantic & Pacific Railroad tracks laid from Vinita.
  - T. J. (Jeff) Archer builds first mercantile store in downtown Tulsa
- 1884 – Presbyterian church founded a mission day school that became the first public school after Tulsa was incorporated.
- 1886 – First Methodist Episcopal Church organized in December in Tulsey Town, Creek Nation.
- 1887 – Tulsa founded.
- 1893 – The Tulsa Review is the first newspaper published in Tulsa.
- 1895 – The New Era newspaper opens. It later renames to the Indian Republican and Tulsa World.
- 1898
  - Town is officially incorporated on January 18.
  - Edward E. Calkins becomes first mayor.
  - Population reported as 1,100.
- 1899
  - First mass said at Holy Family Church.
  - Robert H. Hall built the first telephone system in Tulsa, serving 80 subscribers.
  - R. N. Bynum becomes second mayor.
  - Presbyterian mission school closed permanently after 1898-99 session; building purchased by J. M. Hall and 3 other men and reopened as first public school, beginning Tulsa Public Schools system.
- 1900
  - Commercial Club of Tulsa formed.
  - Population: 1,390.
  - Lewis Poe becomes third mayor

== 20th century ==
=== 1900s-1940s ===
- 1901
  - Oil discovered at Red Fork, near Tulsa, starting oil boom.
  - George D. Blakey becomes the fourth mayor
- 1902 – Tulsa chartered as a city.
- 1903
  - Telephone system sold to Indian Territory Telephone Company.
  - Original 3-story Brady Hotel constructed.
  - George Mowbray becomes the fifth mayor
- 1904
  - Tulsa annexed North Tulsa.
  - First Tulsa bridge built across Arkansas River.
  - Pumping plant built to deliver Arkansas River water to consumers via piping system.
  - Indian Territory Telephone Company bought by Pioneer Company
  - Accidental explosion destroyed Archer store, killed a customer and mortally wounded Jeff Archer.
  - H. R. Cline becomes the sixth mayor

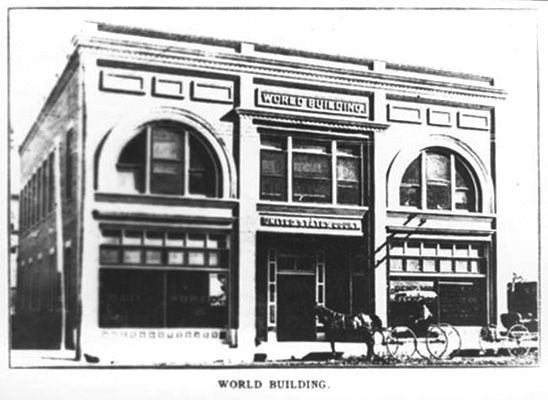
Tulsa World Publishing building in 1906

- 1905
  - Tulsa World newspaper begins publication.
  - Oil discovered at Glenn Pool near Tulsa.
  - First two public schools built.
  - Charles LaFayette Reeder becomes the seventh mayor
- 1906
  - Tulsa Hospital opens (would close after WWI).
  - Trolley begins operating.
  - Tulsa High School built.
  - Oklahoma Natural Gas Company, now named OneOK, founded.
  - John O. Mitchell becomes the eighth mayor

Downtown Tulsa, looking east on 2nd Street from Main Street, 1908.

- 1907
  - Tulsa becomes part of the new U.S. state of Oklahoma, and county seat of newly formed Tulsa County.
  - Henry Kendall College moved from Muskogee to Tulsa.
  - Population: 7,298.
  - William E. Rohde becomes the ninth mayor
- 1908
  - Commission form of government adopted.
  - Orcutt Lake and Amusement Park, privately owned and developed, opened, advertised as Tulsa's first playground.
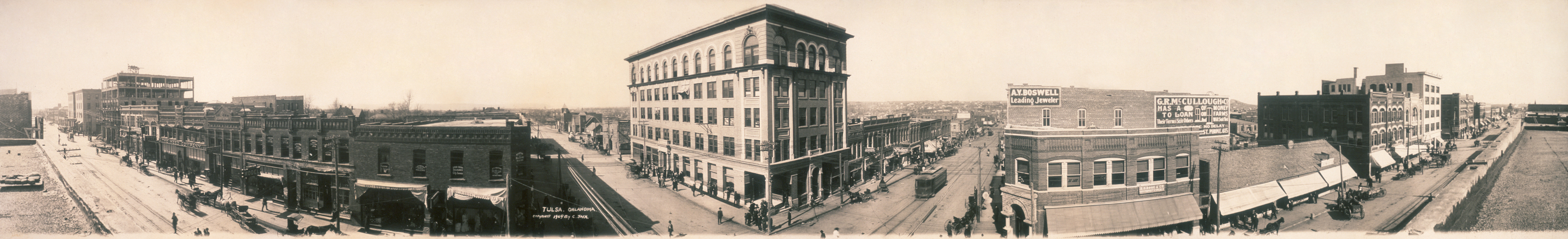
A 1909 panoramic view of Tulsa
- 1909
  - West Tulsa becomes part of Tulsa.
  - Tulsa buys land that would become Woodward Park.
  - John O. Mitchell returns to office and becomes the tenth mayor

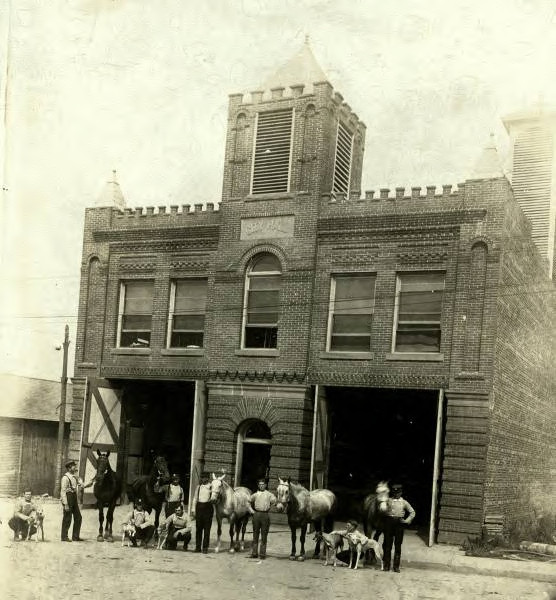
Tulsa City Hall in 1909

- 1910
  - Tulsa County Court House built.
  - Population: 18,182.
  - Exchange National Bank founded after failure of Farmers' National Bank.
  - Texaco builds first oil refinery in West Tulsa.
  - Oil & Gas Journal, oil industry trade journal, headquartered in Tulsa.
  - Area of city: 3.5 square miles.
  - Hotel Brady annex and Tulsa Hotel were built.
  - Loyal J. Martin becomes the eleventh mayor
- 1912 – Frank M. Wooden becomes the twelfth mayor
- 1913
  - Booker T. Washington High School established.
  - Joshua Cosden builds second oil refinery in West Tulsa.
- 1914
  - Tulsa Convention Hall built.
  - Holy Family Cathedral dedicated.
  - Temple Israel congregation founded.
- 1915
  - Oklahoma Hospital established.
  - Chamber of Commerce active.
  - Grace M.E. Church constructed at 3rd and Trenton Ave. now known as The Church Studio
- 1916
  - Carnegie library opens, forerunner of the Tulsa Public Library system.
  - John H. Simmons becomes the thirteenth mayor
- 1917
  - Orcutt Lake Amusement Park closed and converted to Swan Lake residential area. Gus Orcutt sold his development to Tulsa developer, E. J. Brennan, who coined the name Swan Lake. Brennan donated the lake itself to the City of Tulsa as a public park.
  - Tulsa Central High School construction completed
  - Tulsa Outrage occurs.
- 1918
  - Morningside Hospital opened.
  - Cosden Building constructed, considered first "skyscraper" in city.
  - C. H. Hubbard becomes the fourteenth mayor

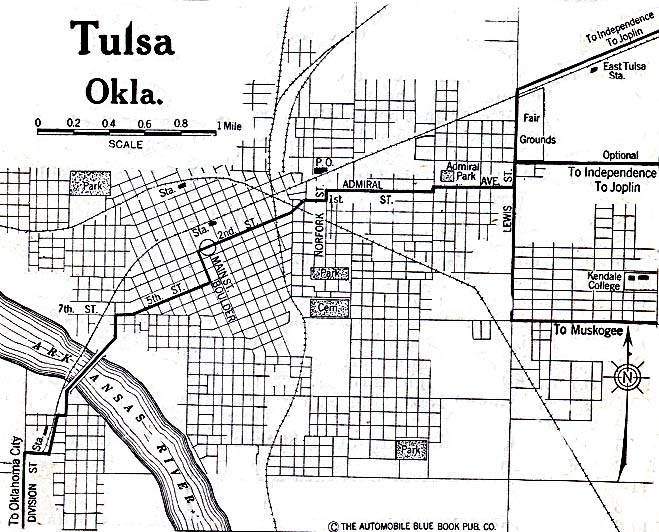
Map of Tulsa in 1920

- 1920
  - Henry Kendall College becomes University of Tulsa.
  - Tulsa Tribune newspaper in publication.
  - Population: 72,075.
  - T. D. Evans becomes the fifteenth mayor
- 1921
  - May 31 – June 1: Tulsa race massacre devastated Greenwood.
  - All Souls Unitarian Church founded.
- 1922
  - Tulsa Little Theater founded.
  - Atlas Life Building constructed.
  - Herman Frederick Newblock becomes the sixteenth mayor
- 1923
  - First International Petroleum Exposition.
  - Major flood of Arkansas River heavily damages Tulsa water purification plant and causes its relocation to a site near Mohawk Park.
  - Oil baron Earl P. and his wife Mary Harwell completed their English Tudor mansion in historic Maple Ridge now known as Harwelden Mansion
- 1924
  - Spavinaw Dam built.
  - Tulsa Community Fund established.
  - St. Johns Hospital opened.
  - Southwestern Bell Telephone Company constructs Main Dial System Building.
- 1925 – Mayo Hotel built.
- 1926
  - KVOO radio begins broadcasting.
  - Tulsa State Fair grounds in use.
- 1927
  - Red Fork becomes part of Tulsa.
  - Tulsa Civic Symphony active.
  - Goodwill Industries of Tulsa incorporated.
  - Tulsa Zoo opens.
  - Tulsa Club Building constructed as a joint venture between the club and the Tulsa Chamber of Commerce.
- 1928
  - Tulsa Coliseum constructed.
  - Carbondale becomes part of Tulsa.
  - Tulsa Municipal Airport dedicated.
  - Spartan Aircraft Company in business.
  - Spartan School of Aeronautics established.
  - Philtower Building constructed.
  - Dan W. Patton becomes the seventeenth mayor
- 1929
  - Tulsa Oilers ice hockey team played the Duluth Hornets for the grand opening of the Tulsa Coliseum on January 1.
  - Boston Avenue Methodist Church and National Bank of Tulsa Building constructed.
  - Mohawk Park Waterworks Plant completed.
  - Tulsa annexed Carbondale.
  - Public Service Company Building completed.
- 1930
  - Cain's Dance Academy in business.
  - Population: 141,258.
  - George L. Watkins becomes the eighteenth mayor
- 1931
  - Union Depot opens.
  - Philcade Building constructed.
  - First All Souls Unitarian Church completed.
- 1932
  - Tulsa Fairgrounds Pavilion (arena) built.
  - Waite Phillips donated his home to become Philbrook Art Museum.
  - Herman Frederick Newblock returned to office and becomes the nineteenth mayor
- 1934
  - National Conference of Christians and Jews Tulsa chapter founded.
  - T. A. Penney becomes the twentieth mayor
- 1935 - Brady Hotel destroyed by fire. (The gutted skeleton remained in place until 1970).
- 1938
  - KOME radio begins broadcasting.
  - Webster High School opens.
- 1939
  - Morningside Hospital reorganized and renamed as Hillcrest Hospital.
  - Philbrook Art Center opens.
  - Will Rogers High School built.
- 1940
  - Population: 142,157.
  - Clarence H. Veale becomes the twenty-first mayor
- 1941 – Air Force builds bomber plant at Tulsa Airport. Douglas Aircraft Co. builds bombers until WWII ends in 1945. Boeing reactivates plant to build B-47s from 1950 to 1953.
- 1943 – Oklahoma Hospital becomes Oklahoma Osteopathic Hospital.
- 1944 – Olney F. Flynn becomes the twenty-second mayor
- 1946
  - American Airlines opens aircraft maintenance facility at Tulsa Airport.
  - Lee Price becomes the twenty-third mayor
- 1948
  - Tulsa Opera and Tulsa Philharmonic founded.
  - Roy M. Lundy becomes the twenty-fourth mayor
- 1949
  - Dawson becomes part of city.
  - KOTV begins broadcasting.

=== 1950s-1990s ===
- 1950 – Population: 182,740.
- 1951 – Bell's Amusement Park opens.
- 1952
  - Lake Eucha and second pipeline from Lake Spavinaw to Tulsa constructed to supplement city water supply.
  - Tulsa Coliseum destroyed by fire after being hit by lightning on September 27, 1952.
- 1953
  - Golden Driller statue created for and displayed at the International Petroleum Exposition.
  - Tulsa Metropolitan Area Planning Commission established.
- 1954 – KTUL-TV and KVOO-TV (television) begin broadcasting.
- 1956
  - Highland Park becomes part of Tulsa.
  - Tulsa Ballet and Tulsa Baptist Association founded.
- 1957
  - All Souls Unitarian Church moves from downtown to Brookside
  - June: Tulsarama pageant held.
- 1958
  - Apache Drive-In cinema opens.
  - Gilcrease Foundation conveyed Gilcrease Museum to the city.
- 1959
  - A black family's home in a predominantly white neighborhood in north Tulsa is bombed during the Civil rights movement.
- 1960
  - Saint Francis Hospital opens.
  - Area of city: 50 square miles.
  - Population: 261,685.
- 1961 – New airport terminal opened.
- 1963 – Tulsa Youth Symphony founded.
- 1964 – Tulsa Convention Center opens.
- 1965
  - Oral Roberts University established.
  - Tulsa City-County Library Central Library opened.
- 1966
  - Area of city expands.
  - Tulsa Expo Center built; Golden Driller statue permanently installed.
  - James M. Hewgley, Jr. becomes mayor.
- 1967
  - Prayer Tower and Fourth National Bank of Tulsa built.
  - Union Depot abandoned after passenger train service ceases.
- 1970
  - Tulsa Junior College established.
  - Robert J. LaFortune becomes mayor.
  - Population: 331,638.
- 1971 – Tulsa Port of Catoosa opened to shipping via the McClellan-Kerr Arkansas River Navigation System.
- 1972
  - Roman Catholic Diocese of Tulsa established.
  - Area of city: 175.71 square miles.
  - Leon Russell returns to his hometown of Oklahoma and turns an old church into a recording studio The Church Studio and office of Shelter Records.
- 1973 – First National BanCorporation Tower built.
- 1974 –
  - Tulsa Area United Way active.
  - F3 tornadoes in the Tulsa metropolitan area kill two people and, combined with flooding, produce the costliest natural disaster in city's history up to that time—a disaster worth $30,000,000
- 1975
  - National Bank of Tulsa renamed Bank of Oklahoma (BOK)
  - Westhope added to NRHP.
  - Tulsa Municipal Building added to NRHP.
  - Williams Brothers Tower (now named BOK Tower) built.
- 1976
  - Memorial Day flood causes major damage along Mingo, Joe and Haikey creeks.
  - Woodland Hills Mall in business.
  - Tulsa Central High School moves from Downtown facility to new Osage County facility. Former school leased to Public Service Company of Oklahoma as new headquarters following remodeling (repurposing).
- 1977 –
  - Tulsa Performing Arts Center opens.

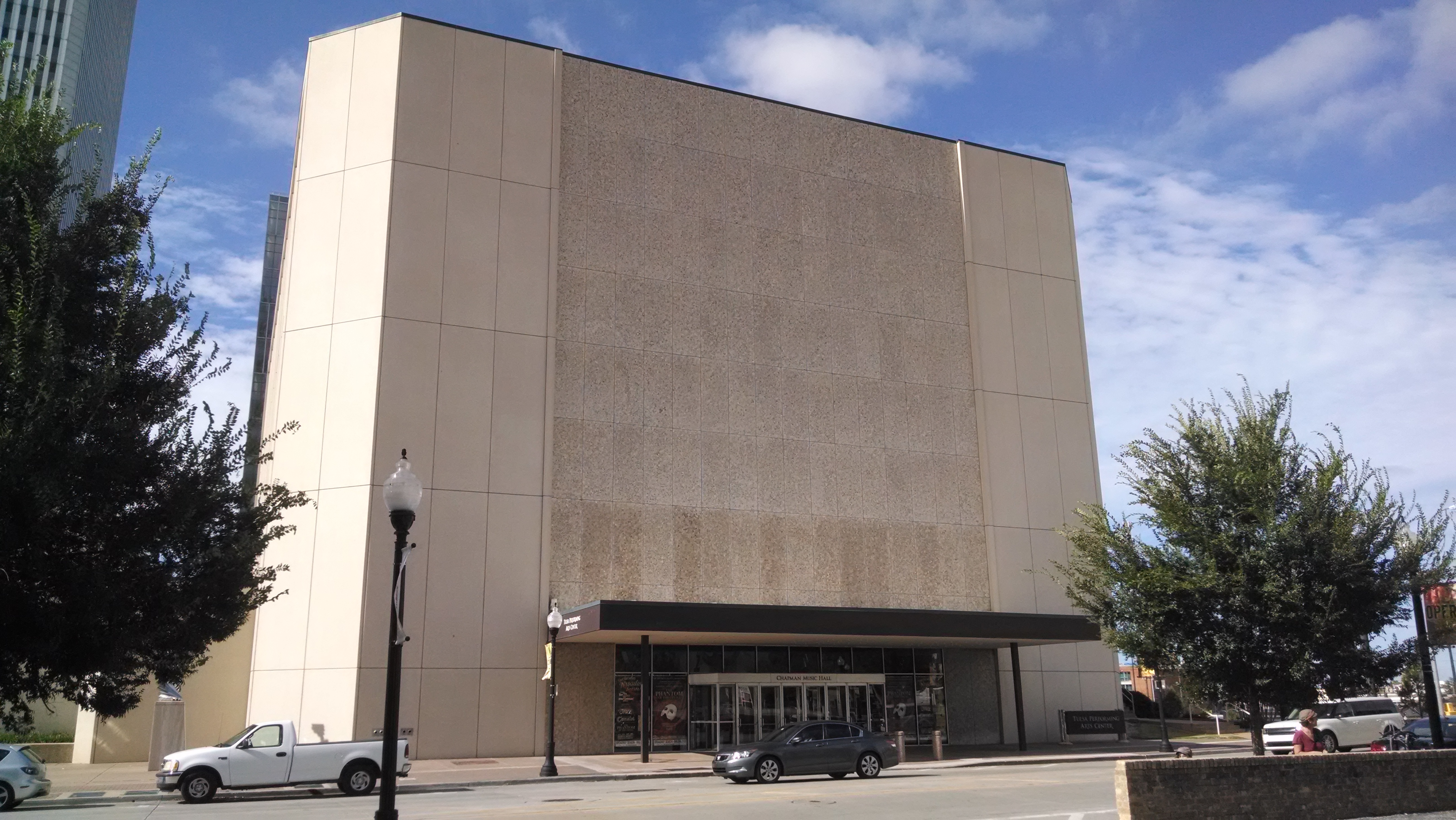
Tulsa Performing Arts Center(PAC)

- 1978
  - Tulsa Signature Symphony founded.
  - Jim Inhofe becomes mayor.
  - Boston Avenue Methodist Church added to NRHP.
  - Philbrook Museum of Art added to NRHP.
  - William G. Skelly House added to NRHP.
- 1979
  - Convention Hall (Brady Theater) added to NRHP.
  - McFarlin Building added to NRHP.
  - Philtower added to NRHP.
  - Pierce Block added to NRHP.
  - Final occurrence of International Petroleum Exposition.
  - Mike Synar becomes U.S. representative for Oklahoma's 2nd congressional district.
- 1980
  - Tulsa Oklahomans for Human Rights group formed.
  - Brady Heights Historic District added to NRHP.
  - Mayo Hotel added to NRHP.
  - Population: 360,919.
- 1981
  - City of Faith Medical and Research Center opens.
  - Tulsa Community Food Bank and Heller Theatre founded.
- 1982
  - Gillette Historic District added to NRHP.
  - Holy Family Cathedral, Rectory and School added to NRHP.
  - Tulsa Pride begins.
- 1983 – Swan Lake Neighborhood Association and Gilbert and Sullivan Society of Tulsa founded.
- 1984
  - Mid-Continent Tower built.
  - Oklahoma Natural Gas Company Building added to NRHP.
  - Public Service of Oklahoma Building added to NRHP.
- 1986 – Philcade Building added to NRHP.
- 1987
  - Chili Bowl midget car race begins.
  - Jim Inhofe becomes U.S. representative for Oklahoma's 1st congressional district.
- 1988 – Tulsa Preservation Commission and Oklahoma Jazz Hall of Fame established.
- 1989
  - Osage Expressway opens.
  - Mayor–council form of government adopted.
- 1990
  - Southwest Tulsa Chamber of Commerce formed.
  - Population: 367,302.
- 1991 – Urban Tulsa Weekly newspaper begins publication.
- 1992
  - Tulsa receives 1992 Outstanding Public Service Award from Federal Emergency Management Agency (FEMA) for its flood management program.
  - Tulsa Tribune goes out of business.
  - Susan Savage becomes first woman to serve as mayor of Tulsa.
- 1994 - Tulsa Club abandons its namesake building, which remains largely unoccupied for nearly 20 years
- 1996 – Camille's Sidewalk Cafe in business.
- 1997 – Conestoga science fiction convention begins.
- 1998
  - Tulsa Community Foundation established.
  - Tulsa Air and Space Museum established.
  - Swan Lake Historic District added to NRHP.
- 1999
  - City website online (approximate date).
  - Eleventh Street Arkansas River Bridge added to NRHP.
  - Hindu Temple of Greater Tulsa founded.
- 2000 – Population: 393,049; metro population: 859,532.

== 21st century ==
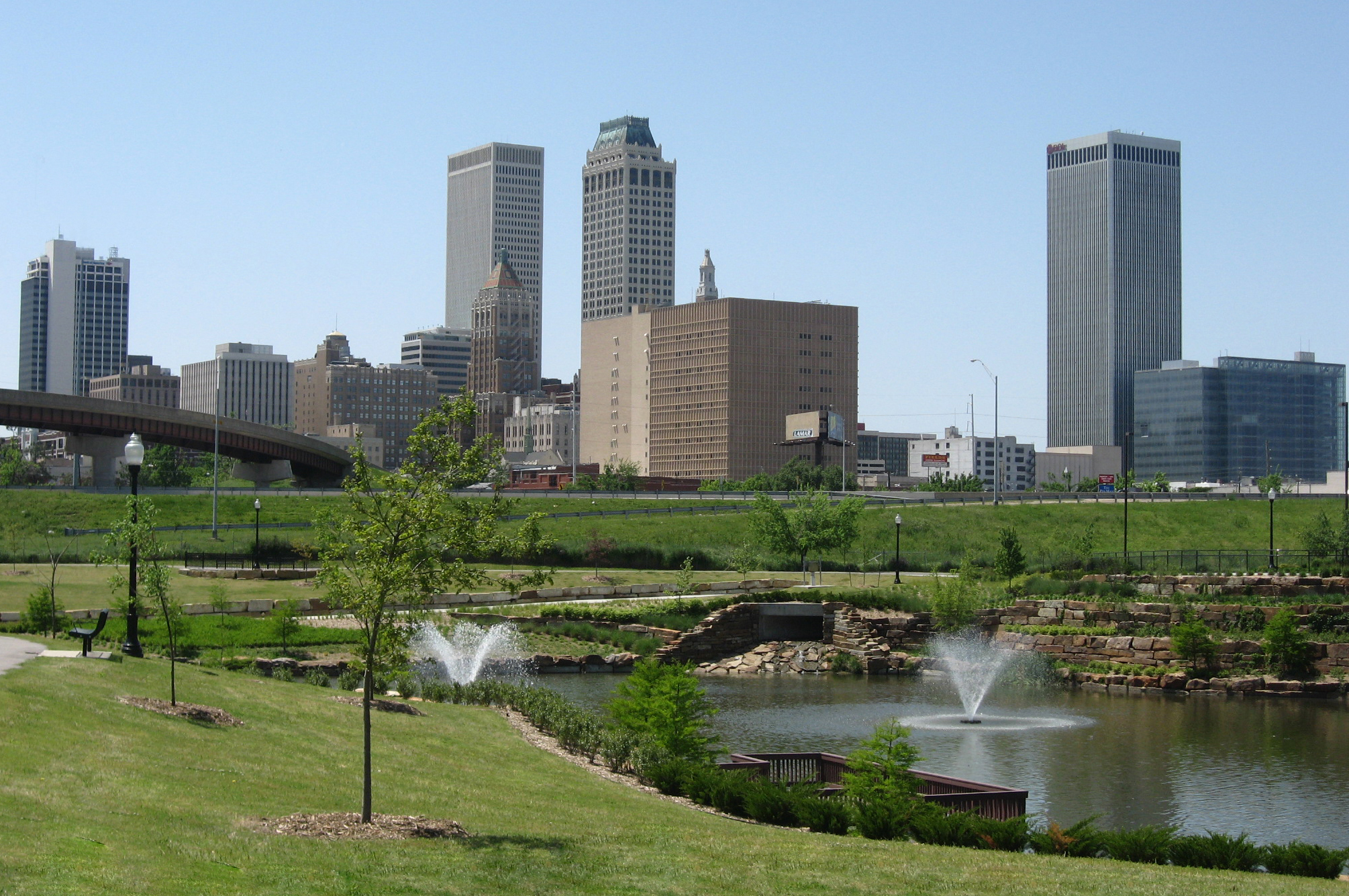
Tulsa's skyline from Central Park in 2008.

- 2001 – White City Historic District added to NRHP
- 2002
  - Diversafest begins;
  - Yorktown Historic District added to NRHP.
- 2003 – Cain's Ballroom added to NRHP
- 2004 – 11th Street Bridge renamed as Cyrus Avery Route 66 Memorial Bridge.
- 2005
  - Tulsa Symphony Orchestra formed.
  - Oklahoma Center for Community and Justice headquartered in Tulsa.
- 2006 – Bell's Amusement Park goes out of business.
- 2007
  - Union Depot building converted to house Oklahoma Jazz Hall of Fame.
  - Will Rogers High School added to NRHP.
  - Buena Vista Park Historic District added to NRHP.
  - Ranch Acres Historic District added to NRHP.
- 2008
  - University of Tulsa selected to manage the Gilcrease Museum.
  - Tokyo, OK (formerly Tokyo in Tulsa) anime convention begins.
  - BOK Center stadium opens.
  - Mt. Zion Baptist Church added to NRHP.
  - Opening of Cyrus Avery Route 66 Memorial Plaza
- 2009
  - Old Temple Israel accidentally burns down
  - Tulsa Botanic Garden opens to public.
  - Dewey F. Bartlett, Jr. becomes mayor.
  - Atlas Life Building added to NRHP.
- 2010
  - This Land Press begins publication.
  - Population: 391,906; metro 937,478.
  - Area of city: 196.75 square miles.
  - Oil Capital Historic District created on December 10, 2010.
  - Brady Historic District added to NRHP.
- 2012 – Oklahoma Defenders football team active.

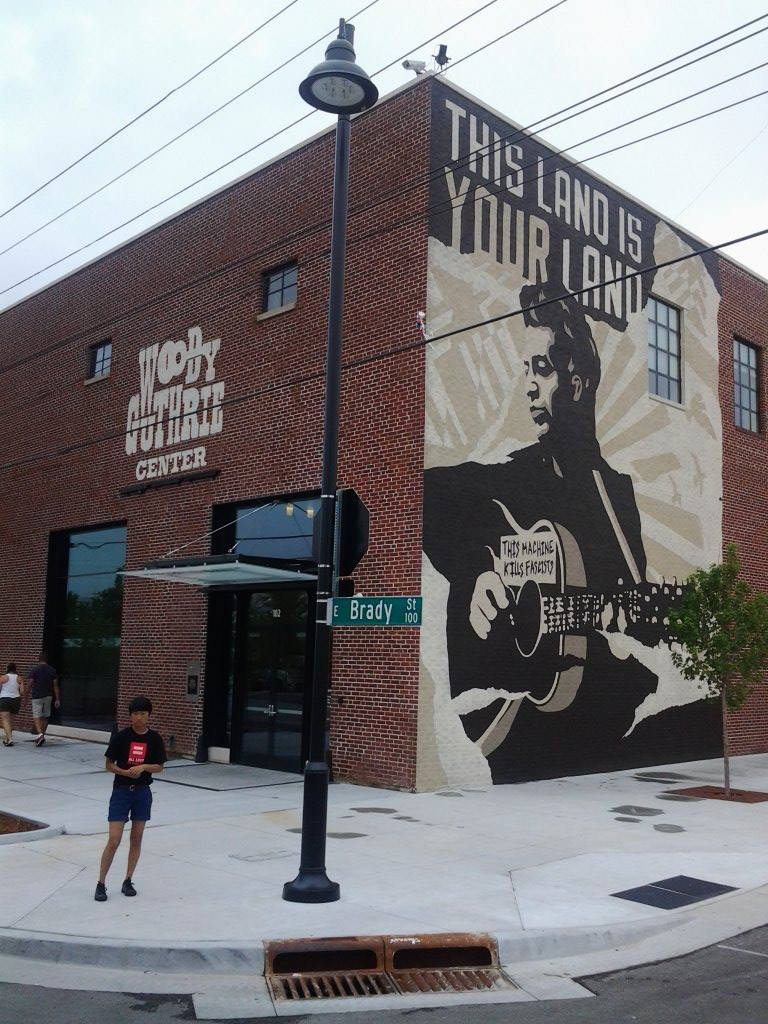
Exterior of Woody Guthrie Center in the Brady Arts District of Tulsa, Oklahoma.

- 2013
  - Tulsa Convention Center renamed as Cox Business Center.
  - Center of the Universe Festival (music fest) held.
  - Woody Guthrie Center opens as museum and archive for the artist.
  - Jim Bridenstine becomes U.S. representative for Oklahoma's 1st congressional district.
  - Construction begins on Phase 1 of Cousins Park.
- 2014
  - Woodward Park and Gardens Historic District established
  - Helmerich Center for American Research at Gilcrease Museum completed.
- 2015
  - James Pepper Henry becomes director of Gilcrease Museum on March 1.
  - Frontier news begins publication.
  - Oklahoma Defenders football team ceased operating.
- 2016
  - Vision 2025 Tax plan approved by voters to provide funding for planned major projects.
  - Former Public Service of Oklahoma (PSO) headquarters renamed as Art Deco Lofts and Apartments; new residents begin move-in in July.
- 2017
  - James Pepper Henry resigns as director of Gilcrease Museum, effective April 14, to become Director of the American Indian Cultural Center & Museum in Oklahoma City.
  - EF-2 Tornado strikes southeast Tulsa after midnight August 5–6, causing major property damage, especially to Promenade Mall and 18-story Remington Tower office building near 41st Street and Skelly Drive. The storm caused no deaths, but sent 32 people to hospitals.
- 2018 "Gathering Place" holds grand opening to public on September 8.
- 2019
  - Tulsa Club Hotel (formerly known as the Tulsa Club Building) opens for business on April 18.
  - High water along the Arkansas River and its tributaries cause serious flooding in Tulsa Metropolitan area; forces shutdowns of Gathering Place and the Tulsa Port of Catoosa.
- 2020
  - U.S. Census population 413,066.
  - Wendell Franklin appointed as Chief of Police on February 1.
- 2021
  - Former congressman Brad Carson becomes president of University of Tulsa on July 1.
- 2022
  - Discovery Lab at Gathering Place holds grand opening on January 24.
  - Warren Clinic shooting

== See also ==
- List of mayors of Tulsa, Oklahoma
- National Register of Historic Places listings in Tulsa County, Oklahoma
- Timelines of other cities in Oklahoma: Norman, Oklahoma City

== Bibliography ==
=== Published in 20th century ===
- "Tulsa" . Encyclopædia Britannica. Vol. 27 (11th ed.). 1910. p. 368.
- Tulsa, Oklahoma Directory. Hoffhine. 1910.
- Tulsa City Directory. Polk-Hoffhine Directory Co. 1920–1922.
- Clarence B. Douglas (1921), History of Tulsa, Oklahoma, Chicago: Clarke
- Goble, Danney (1998) [1997]. Tulsa! Biography of the American City. Tulsa: Council Oak Books. ISBN 1-57178-051-3.
- James M. Hall, The Beginning of Tulsa (Tulsa, Okla: N.p., 1933).
- Thoburn, Joseph B.; Wright, Muriel H. (1929). Oklahoma: A History of The State and Its People. Vol. 2. New York: Lewis Historical Publishing Company.
- Federal Writers' Project (1938), Tulsa: A Guide to the Oil Capital, American Guide Series
- Federal Writers' Project (1941), "Tulsa", Oklahoma: A Guide to the Sooner State, American Guide Series, Norman: University of Oklahoma Press
- Angie Debo, Tulsa: From Creek Town to Oil Capital, 1943. Norman: University of Oklahoma Press.
- Nina Dunn, “Tulsa’s Magic Roots: An Early History of Tulsa,” (Okla. Book Pub. Co. 1979)
- The Tulsa Historic Preservation Plan (Tulsa, Okla.: Tulsa Preservation Commission, 1992).

=== Published in 21st century ===
- David J. Wishart, ed. (2004). "Cities and Towns: Tulsa, Oklahoma". Encyclopedia of the Great Plains. University of Nebraska Press. ISBN 0-8032-4787-7.
- Carl Gregory (2007). "Tulsa". Encyclopedia of Oklahoma History & Culture. Oklahoma Historical Society and Oklahoma State University Library Electronic Publishing Center.
- David Goldfield, ed. (2007). "Tulsa, Oklahoma". Encyclopedia of American Urban History. Sage. ISBN 978-1-4522-6553-7.
