= Woodson Norvell =

American politician

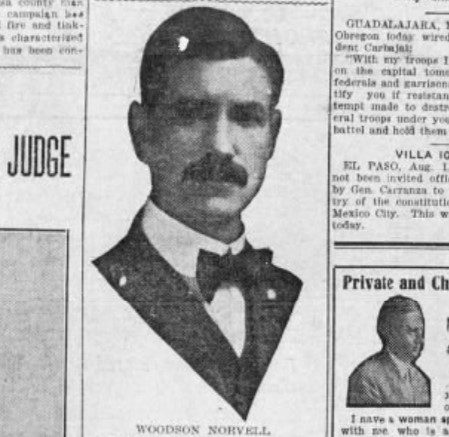

Member of the Oklahoma House of Representatives from the Creek County and Tulsa County district
- In office November 16, 1907 – November 16, 1908
- Preceded by: Position established
- Succeeded by: John Simmons

Personal details
- Born: August 9, 1880 Linn County, Missouri
- Died: January 1, 1950 (aged 69) Washington, D.C.
- Party: Democratic Party
- Children: George E. Norvell

Woodson Easley Norvell (August 9, 1880 – January 1, 1950) was an American politician who served as a Democratic member of the 1st Oklahoma House of Representatives from 1907 to 1908 representing Tulsa County. His son, George E. Norvell, was the 28th Mayor of Tulsa. He ran for Lieutenant Governor of Oklahoma in 1914.

== Electoral history ==
Oklahoma lieutenant gubernatorial Democratic primary (August 4, 1914)
Party	Candidate	Votes	%
Democratic	Martin E. Trapp	18,178	16.0%
Democratic	Ben F. Lafayette	17,192	15.1%
Democratic	Pete P. Duffy	16,307	14.3%
Democratic	Frank F. Davis	14,498	12.7%
Democratic	Woodson Norvell	11,351	9.9%
Democratic	Edwin Sorrells	10,646	9.3%
Democratic	Richard Billups	10,233	9.0%
Democratic	John W. Barbour	8,704	7.6%
Democratic	Bert Van Leuven	3,312	2.9%
Democratic	Robert H. Oury	3,123	2.7%
Turnout		113,544	
