= George E. Norvell =

American politician

28th Mayor of Tulsa
- In office 1956–1958
- Preceded by: L. C. Clark
- Succeeded by: James L. Maxwell

Personal details
- Born: George Eldon Norvell; July 20, 1907 Tulsa, Indian Territory
- Died: October 5, 1990 (aged 83) Tulsa, Oklahoma, U.S.
- Party: Democratic Party
- Parent: Woodson Norvell (father)

George Eldon Norvell (July 20, 1907 – October 5, 1990) was an American politician who served as the 28th Mayor of Tulsa between 1956 and 1958. He was the first native-born mayor of Tulsa.

== Biography ==
George E. Norvell was born in 1907 in Tulsa, Oklahoma (then-Indian Territory) to Woodson Norvell, a member of the 1st Oklahoma Legislature, and Norma Lillie Ogan. He was delivered by another Tulsa mayor, Dr. Charles LaFayette Reeder. He graduated from George Washington University in 1931 and became the city attorney for Seminole, Oklahoma the next year. He held that position until he joined the state Board of Review for Unemployment Compensation from 1939 to 1942.

He enlisted in the United States Army in 1942, serving in China. He left the Army as a second lieutenant. He was appointed by Governor Roy J. Turner as Tulsa County's first juvenile judge in 1949 and resigned in 1954 to run for the United States House of Representatives. From 1956 to 1958 he served as the 28th Mayor of Tulsa.

He was a member of the Democratic Party.
