= James Maxwell (American politician) =

American politician

29th Mayor of Tulsa
- In office May 6, 1958 – May 3, 1966
- Preceded by: George E. Norvell
- Succeeded by: James Hewgley, Jr.

Personal details
- Born: James Livingston Maxwell; May 12, 1926 Tulsa, Oklahoma, U.S.
- Died: October 18, 1984 (aged 58) Oklahoma City, Oklahoma, U.S.
- Party: Democratic
- Education: Oklahoma State University

James Livingston Maxwell (May 12, 1926 — October 18, 1984) was an American politician. A member of the Democratic Party, he served as the 29th Mayor of Tulsa from 1958 to 1966, during which Tulsa completed significant improvements to its downtown and passed laws banning racial discrimination.

== Early life and career ==
James Livingston Maxwell was born on May 12, 1926, in Tulsa to William and Mary O'Donnell Maxwell, owners of the Maxwell Flower House floral store in downtown Tulsa. After graduating from Central High School, Maxwell served in the United States Army in the China Burma India theater of World War II. Maxwell then enrolled at Oklahoma State University after his military service, graduating in 1950 with a B.A. in government.

Maxwell became a partner of the Maxwell Flower House after college. For three months during the Korean War, Maxwell returned to Army duty as a recruiter in Tulsa. He became president of the Tulsa chapter of the United States Junior Chamber and a member of the Presbyterian Church.

== Mayor of Tulsa (1958–1966) ==
Maxwell declared his candidacy for Mayor of Tulsa on February 8, 1958, running on a platform to change Tulsa's government to a strong mayor form.

On April 1, 1958, Maxwell won the election by nearly 2,300 votes over Republican opponent Jack Handley. Sworn in on May 6, 1958, Maxwell took office just a week before his 32nd birthday and became the city's youngest mayor. He was known to work 16 hours a day.

Tulsa voters approved nearly $7.2 million in bonds to build a new civic center in his first year in office. During his tenure, Tulsa had many improvements to its downtown infrastructure worth $24 million in five years, including the Cox Business Convention Center, modernized city and county government headquarters, central library, the Inner Dispersal Loop, and the Tulsa International Airport. He also oversaw the acquisition of the Gilcrease Museum. New city ordinances were passed banning racial discrimination, prior to the Civil Rights Act of 1964.

In 1960, the Tulsa Metropolitan Area Planning Commission released the city's first master plan. Under a new state law from 1959, Tulsa also created the Tulsa Urban Renewal Authority; throughout the 1960s, it used the power of eminent domain and over $42 million in federal funding to build a new DoubleTree hotel and Center Plaza apartments on what it considered "blighted" land south of the new civic center.

Having been re-elected in 1960, 1962, and 1964, Maxwell lost his re-election campaign to Republican challenger James Hewgley, Jr. on April 5, 1966. Maxwell's last day in office was May 3, 1966. By the end of his administration, Maxwell became the second Tulsa mayor to have served four terms, following Herman Frederick Newblock.

== Post-political life ==
After leaving the mayor's office, Maxwell returned to the Maxwell Flower House. From 1967 to 1971, he lived in Washington, D. C., working in lobbying and consulting roles, including as a consultant to the United States Department of Commerce. In 1968, Maxwell lost a comeback attempt to be mayor of Tulsa.

He later directed the Transportation and Energy Conservation Services divisions of the Oklahoma Corporation Commission. Maxwell died of cancer at an Oklahoma City hospital on October 18, 1984.
