= Tulsa Signature Symphony =

The Signature Symphony at TCC is a professional orchestra-in-residence at Tulsa Community College (TCC). It was founded by Dr. G. Barry Epperley in 1978. Dr. Epperley has announced his retirement effective in 2014. A replacement has not yet been selected. The orchestra initially started as a small professional chamber orchestra in 1978 called the Tulsa Little Symphony and in the early 1980s became the Oklahoma Sinfonia, presenting a series of pops and light classics at the Brady Theater for more than a decade. In 1997 the orchestra became a much larger ensemble and changed its name to the Signature Symphony at TCC when it became associated with TCC.
