= L. C. Clark =

American politician

27th Mayor of Tulsa
- In office 1954–1956
- Preceded by: Clancy M. Warren
- Succeeded by: George E. Norvell

Personal details
- Born: November 21, 1893 Shelby County, Missouri, US
- Died: August 12, 1977 (aged 83) Tulsa County, Oklahoma, US

Lilburn Carl Clark (also seen L.C. Clark) was an American politician who served as the 27th Mayor of Tulsa from 1954 to 1956.
