= George H. Stoner =

American politician

25th Mayor of Tulsa
- In office 1950–1952
- Preceded by: Roy M. Lundy
- Succeeded by: Clancy M. Warren

Personal details
- Born: July 11, 1887; Glenfield, Pennsylvania, US
- Died: September 19, 1966 (aged 79); Tulsa County, Oklahoma, US
- Political party: Republican

George H. Stoner was an American politician who served as the 25th Mayor of Tulsa from 1950 to 1952. He ended the rent controls implemented during World War II.
