= John Hope Franklin =

American historian (1915–2009)

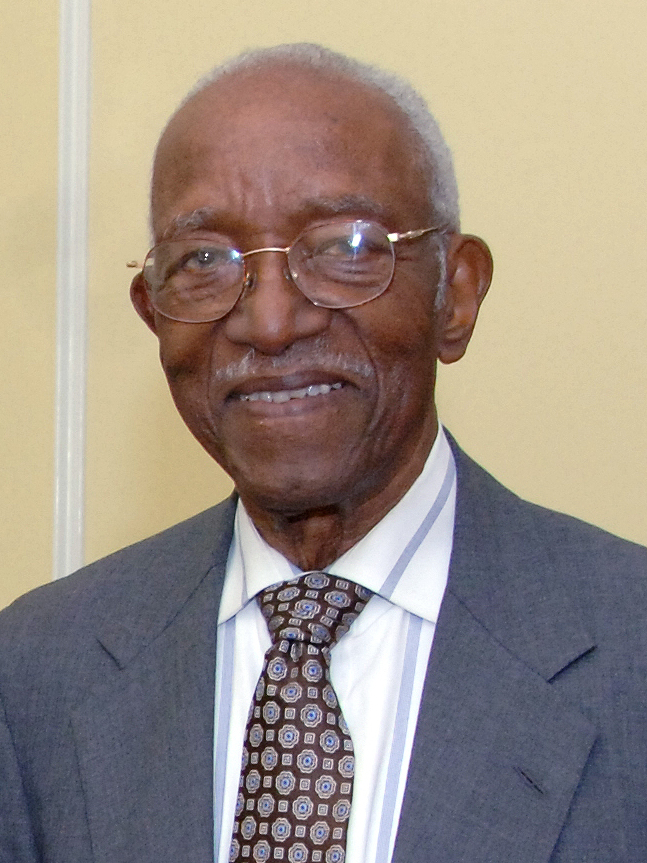
- Franklin in 2006
- Born: January 2, 1915; Rentiesville, Oklahoma, United States
- Died: March 25, 2009 (aged 94); Duke University Medical Center, Durham, North Carolina, United States
- Education: Fisk University (B.A., 1935); Harvard University (M.A., 1936; Ph.D., 1941)
- Occupations: Scholar, historian, author, professor
- Spouse: Aurelia Whittington Franklin (m. 1940; d. 1999)
- Children: John Whittington Franklin
- Honors: John W. Kluge Prize in the Human Sciences (2006); 100 Greatest African Americans (2002); Presidential Medal of Freedom (1995); Manly Distinguished Service Professor, at the University of Chicago (1969); James B. Duke Professor of History at Duke (1983); Jefferson Lecturer (1976)

John Hope Franklin (January 2, 1915 – March 25, 2009) was an American historian who focused on the history of the United States. He is best known for his work From Slavery to Freedom, first published in 1947 and continually updated. More than three million copies have been sold.

Born in Oklahoma, Franklin attended Fisk University and then Harvard University, receiving his doctorate in 1941. He was a professor at Howard University, and in 1956 was named to head the history department at Brooklyn College, part of the City University of New York. Recruited to the University of Chicago in 1964, he eventually led the history department and was appointed to a named chair. He then moved to Duke University in 1983, as an appointee to a named chair in history.

He was a president of Phi Beta Kappa, the Organization of American Historians, the American Historical Association, the American Studies Association, and the Southern Historical Association. In 1995, he was awarded the Presidential Medal of Freedom, the nation's highest civilian honor.

== Early life and education ==
Franklin was born in Rentiesville, Oklahoma, in 1915 to attorney Buck (Charles) Colbert Franklin and his wife Mollie (Parker) Franklin. He was named after John Hope, a prominent educator who was the first African-American president of Atlanta University.

Franklin graduated from Booker T. Washington High School (then segregated) in Tulsa, Oklahoma. He graduated in 1935 from Fisk University, a historically black university in Nashville, Tennessee, then earned a master's degree in 1936 and a doctorate in history in 1941 from Harvard University. Two fellowships (1937 and 1938) from the Rosenwald Fund enabled him to study for his PhD at Harvard.

=== Father ===
Buck Colbert Franklin was a civil rights lawyer, also known as "Amazing Buck Franklin," of African-American and Choctaw ancestry, born in the Chickasaw Nation in western Indian Territory (formerly Pickens County). He was the seventh of ten children born to David and Milley Franklin. David was a former slave, who became a Chickasaw Freedman when emancipated after the American Civil War. Milley was born free before the war and was of one-fourth Choctaw and three-fourths African-American ancestry.

Buck Franklin is best known for defending African-American survivors of the 1921 Tulsa race massacre, in which whites had attacked many blacks and buildings, and burned and destroyed the Greenwood District. This was known at the time as the "Black Wall Street," and was the wealthiest Black community in the United States, a center of black commerce and culture. In 2015, Buck Franklin's previously unknown written eyewitness account of the 1921 Greenwood attack, a 10-page typewritten manuscript, was discovered and subsequently obtained by the Smithsonian's National Museum of African American History and Culture. Franklin and his colleagues also became experts at oil law, representing "blacks and Native Americans in Oklahoma against white lawyers representing oil barons." His career demonstrated a strong professional black life in the West, at a time when such accomplishments would have been more difficult to achieve in the Deep South.

== Career ==
"My challenge," Franklin said, "was to weave into the fabric of American history enough of the presence of blacks so that the story of the United States could be told adequately and fairly."

In his autobiography, Franklin has described a series of formative incidents in which he confronted racism while seeking to volunteer his services at the beginning of the Second World War. He responded to the navy's search for qualified clerical workers, but after he presented his extensive qualifications, the navy recruiter told him that he was the wrong color for the position. He was similarly unsuccessful in finding a position with a War Department historical project. When he went to have a blood test, as required for the draft, the doctor initially refused to allow him into his office. Afterward, Franklin took steps to avoid the draft, on the basis that the country did not respect him or have an interest in his well-being, because of his color.

According to his article, To and From Brown v. Board of Education, written upon the 50th anniversary of Brown and Bolling, Franklin says that Thurgood Marshall recruited him to help respond to the Supreme Court questions in response to the 5 cases brought. Specifically they wanted both sides to address the question of whether or not those who wrote and passed the Fourteenth Amendment also meant the elimination of segregation in the public schools.

Since Marshall and his colleagues were not that knowledgeable in the history of Reconstruction, he asked Franklin to work together with Woodward to develop the legal responses. Franklin continued to teach and then spent three days a week at the offices of the NAACP Legal Defense Fund to gather supporting evidence regarding Reconstruction and constitutional history on the topic. This included strategies and intentions of Southern leaders who perpetuated and enforced segregation. One of the papers he wrote was published as "Jim Crow Goes to School: The Genesis of Legal Segregation in Southern Schools". In a landmark ruling, it ruled in 1954 that the legal segregation of black and white children in public schools was unconstitutional, leading to integration of schools.

=== Professor and researcher ===
Franklin's teaching career began at Fisk University. During World War II, he taught at St. Augustine's College from 1939 to 1943 and the North Carolina College for Negroes, currently North Carolina Central University from 1943 to 1947.

From 1947 to 1956, he taught at Howard University. In 1956, Franklin was selected to chair the history department at Brooklyn College, the first person of color to head a major history department. Franklin served there until 1964, when he was recruited by the University of Chicago. He spent 1962 as a visiting professor at the University of Cambridge, holding the Professorship of American History and Institutions.

David Levering Lewis said that while he was deciding to become a historian, he learned that Franklin, his mentor, had been named departmental chairman at Brooklyn College.

Now that certainly is a distinction. It had never happened before that a person of color had chaired a major history department. That meant a lot to me. If I had doubt about (the) viability of a career in history, that example certainly helped put to rest such concerns.

In researching his prize-winning biography of W. E. B. Du Bois, Lewis said he became aware of Franklin's

courage during that period in the 1950s when Du Bois became an un-person, when many progressives were tarred and feathered with the brush of subversion. John Hope Franklin was a rock; he was loyal to his friends. In the case of W. E. B. Du Bois, Franklin spoke out in his defense, not (about) Du Bois's communism, but of the right of an intellectual to express ideas that were not popular. I find that admirable. It was a high risk to take and we may be heading again into a period when the free concourse of ideas in the academy will have a price put upon it. In the final years of an active teaching career, I will have John Hope Franklin's example of high scholarship, great courage and civic activism.

From 1964 through 1968, Franklin was a professor of history at the University of Chicago, and chair of the department from 1967 to 1970. There he served as a member of the committee that produced the Kalven report. In 1965, he marched with Dr. Martin Luther King on the Selma to Montgomery marches. He was named to the endowed position of John Matthews Manly Distinguished Service Professor, which he held from 1969 to 1982. He was appointed to the Fulbright Board of Foreign Scholarships, 1962–1969, and was its chair from 1966 to 1969.

In 1976, the National Endowment for the Humanities selected Franklin for the Jefferson Lecture, the U.S. federal government's highest honor for achievement in the humanities. Franklin's three-part lecture became the basis for his book Racial Equality in America.

Franklin was appointed to the U.S. Delegation to the UNESCO General Conference, Belgrade (1980).

In 1983, Franklin was appointed as the James B. Duke Professor of History at Duke University. In 1985, he took emeritus status from this position. During this same year, he helped to establish the Durham Literacy Center and served on its Board until his death in 2009.

Franklin was also Professor of Legal History at the Duke University Law School from 1985 to 1992.

=== Racial Equality in America ===
Racial Equality in America is the published lecture series that Franklin presented in 1976 for the Jefferson Lecture sponsored by the National Endowment for Humanities. The book is composed of three lectures, given in three different cities, in which Franklin chronicled the history of race in the United States from revolutionary times to 1976. These lectures explore the differences between some of the beliefs related to race with the reality documented in various historical and government texts, as well as data gathered from census, property, and literary sources. The first lecture is titled "The Dream Deferred" and discusses the period from the Revolution to 1820. The second lecture is titled "The Old Order Changeth Not" and discusses the rest of the 19th century. The third lecture is titled "Equality Indivisible" and discusses the 20th century.

== Later life and death ==
In 2005, at the age of 90, Franklin published and lectured on his new autobiography, Mirror to America: The Autobiography of John Hope Franklin. In 2006, Mirror to America received the Robert F. Kennedy Center for Justice and Human Rights Book Award, which is given annually to honor authors "whose writing, in illuminating past or present injustice, acts as a beacon towards a more just society."

In 2006, he also received the John W. Kluge Prize and as the recipient lectured on the successes and failures of race relations in America in Where do We Go from Here? In 2008, Franklin endorsed presidential candidate Barack Obama.

Franklin died at Duke University Medical Center on the morning of March 25, 2009.

== Honors ==
In 1991, Franklin's students honored him with a festschrift The Facts of Reconstruction: Essays in Honor of John Hope Franklin (edited by Eric Anderson & Alfred A. Moss Jr. Baton Rouge: Louisiana State University Press, 1991).

Franklin served as president of the American Historical Association (1979), the American Studies Association (1967), the Southern Historical Association (1970), and the Organization of American Historians (1975). He was a member of the board of trustees at Fisk University, the Chicago Public Library, and the Chicago Symphony Orchestra Association.

Franklin was elected as a foundation member of Fisk's new chapter of Phi Beta Kappa in 1953, when Fisk became the first historically black college to have a chapter of the honor society. In 1973–1976, he served as President of the United Chapters of Phi Beta Kappa.

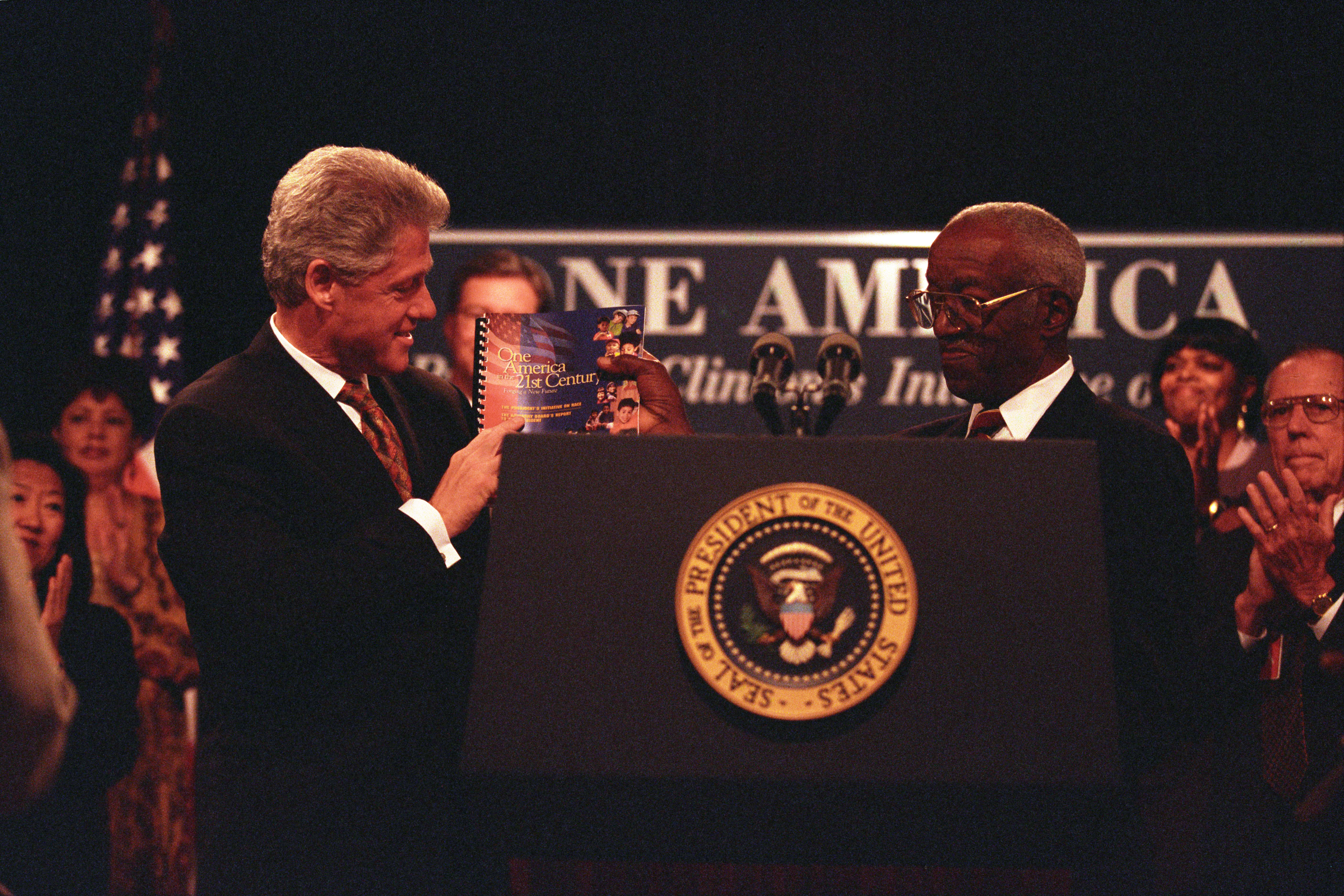
Franklin with President Bill Clinton at an event for the One America Initiative, 1998

Additionally, Franklin was appointed to serve on national commissions, including the National Council on the Humanities, the President's Advisory Commission on Ambassadorial Appointments, and One America Initiative.

Franklin was a member of Alpha Phi Alpha fraternity. He was an early beneficiary of the fraternity's Foundation Publishers, which provides financial support and fellowship for writers addressing African-American issues.

In 1962, honored as an outstanding historian, Franklin became the first black member of the exclusive Cosmos Club in Washington, D.C.

In 1964, Franklin was elected to the American Academy of Arts and Sciences

The John Hope Franklin Research Center for African and African American History and Culture resides at Duke University's David M. Rubenstein Rare Book & Manuscript Library and contains his personal and professional papers. The archive is one of three academic units named after Franklin at Duke. The others are the John Hope Franklin Center for Interdisciplinary and International Studies, which opened in February 2001 and the Franklin Humanities Institute. Franklin had previously rejected Duke's offer to name a center for African-American Studies after him, saying that he was a historian of America and the world, too.

In 1973, Franklin was elected to the American Philosophical Society.

In 1975, he was awarded the St. Louis Literary Award from the Saint Louis University Library Associates.

In 1975, Franklin was awarded an honorary Doctor of Laws (LL.D.) degree from Whittier College.

In 1978, he was inducted into the Oklahoma Hall of Fame.

In 1994, the Society of American Historians – founded by Allan Nevins and other historians to encourage literary distinction in the writing of history – awarded Franklin its Bruce Catton Prize for Lifetime Achievement.

In 1995, he was awarded the Spingarn Medal from the NAACP.

In 1995, President Clinton awarded Franklin the Presidential Medal of Freedom, the nation's highest civilian honor. The President's remarks upon presentation of the medal cited Franklin's lifelong work as a teacher and a student of history, seeking to bring about better understanding regarding relations between whites and blacks in modern times.

In 1995, he received the Chicago History Museum "Making History Award" for Distinction in Historical Scholarship.

In 1996, Franklin received the Golden Plate Award of the American Academy of Achievement.

In 1997, Franklin was selected to receive the Peggy V. Helmerich Distinguished Author Award, a career literary award given annually by the Tulsa Library Trust. Franklin was the first (and so far only) native Oklahoman to receive the award. During his visit to Tulsa to accept the award, Franklin made several appearances to speak about his childhood experiences with racial segregation, as well as his father's experiences as a lawyer in the aftermath of the 1921 Tulsa race massacre.

In 1998, Franklin received The Lincoln Forum's Richard Nelson Current Award of Achievement.

In 2002, scholar Molefi Kete Asante included Franklin on his list of 100 Greatest African Americans.

Oklahoma Governor Brad Henry presented the Governor's Arts Award to Dr. Franklin in 2004.

In 2005, Franklin received the North Caroliniana Society Award for "long and distinguished service in the encouragement, production, enhancement, promotion, and preservation of North Caroliniana."

On May 20, 2006, Franklin was awarded the honorary degree of Doctor of Humane Letters at Lafayette College's 171st Commencement Exercises.

On November 15, 2006, Franklin was announced as the third recipient of the John W. Kluge Prize for lifetime achievement in the study of humanity. He shared the prize with Yu Ying-shih.

On October 27, 2010, the City of Tulsa, Oklahoma renamed Reconciliation Park, established to commemorate the victims of the Tulsa race massacre of 1921, as John Hope Franklin Reconciliation Park in his honor. It includes a 27-foot bronze entitled Tower of Reconciliation by African-American sculptor Ed Dwight, expressing the long history of Africans in Oklahoma.

On November 2, 2019, Franklin was recognized as a Main Honoree by the Sesquicentennial Honors Commission at the Durham 150 Closing Ceremony in Durham, North Carolina on November 2, 2019. The posthumous recognition was bestowed upon 29 individuals "whose dedication, accomplishments and passion have helped shape Durham in important ways.

== Marriage and family ==
Franklin married Aurelia Whittington on June 11, 1940. She was a librarian. Their only child, John Whittington Franklin, was born August 24, 1952. Their marriage lasted 59 years, until January 27, 1999, when Aurelia succumbed to a long illness.

The Franklins were avid orchid collectors and cultivators, and each had types of orchids named after them: Phalaenopsis John Hope Franklin and Phalaenopsis Aurelia Franklin.

== Selected works ==
- The Free Negro in North Carolina, 1790–1860, Chapel Hill: University of North Carolina Press, 1943, 1995.
- The Diary of James T. Ayers, Civil War Recruiter ed., with introd., by John Franklin. Springfield; State of Illinois, 1947.
- From Slavery to Freedom: A History of African Americans, 1st edn New York: A. A. Knopf, 1947. Last updated by Evelyn Brooks Higginbotham, 9th edn. McGraw-Hill Education, 2010, ISBN 978-0-07-296378-6
- The Militant South, 1800–1861. Cambridge: Belknap Press of Harvard University Press, 1956; 1st Illinois pbk. Urbana: University of Illinois Press, 2002.
- Reconstruction: after the Civil War. Chicago: University of Chicago Press, 1961.
- The Emancipation Proclamation. 1st edn. Garden City, N.Y.: Doubleday, 1963; 2nd edn. Washington, DC: National Archives and Records Administration, 1993.
- Land of the Free; A History of the United States, by John W. Caughey, John Hope Franklin and Ernest R. May. Educational advisers: Richard M. Clowes and Alfred T. Clark Jr. Rev. New York: Benziger Bros., 1966.
- The Negro in Twentieth Century America: A Reader on the Struggle for Civil Rights, by John Hope Franklin & Isidore Starr. New York: Vintage Books, 1967.
- Color and Race, Boston: Houghton Mifflin, 1968.
- The Historian and Public Policy, Chicago: University of Chicago, Center for Policy Study, c1974.
- Racial Equality in America, Chicago: University of Chicago Press, c1976.
- A Southern Odyssey: Travelers in the Antebellum North, Baton Rouge: Louisiana State University Press, c1976.
- Black Leaders of the Twentieth Century, edited by John Hope Franklin and August Meier. Urbana: University of Illinois Press, c1982.
- George Washington Williams: a Biography, Chicago: University of Chicago Press, 1985; Reprint, Durham, N.C.: Duke University Press, 1998.
- Race and History: Selected Essays 1938–1988, Baton Rouge: Louisiana State University Press, c1989.
- The Facts of Reconstruction: Essays in Honor of John Hope Franklin, edited by Eric Anderson & Alfred A. Moss Jr. Baton Rouge: Louisiana State University Press, c1991.
- The Color Line: Legacy for the Twenty-first Century, Columbia: University of Missouri Press, c1993.
- Racial Equality in America, Columbia: University of Missouri Press, 1993.
- My Life and an Era: the Autobiography of Buck Colbert Franklin, edited by John Hope Franklin and John Whittington Franklin. Baton Rouge: Louisiana State University Press, c1997, 2000.
- Runaway Slaves: Rebels on the Plantation, John Hope Franklin, Loren Schweninger. New York: Oxford University Press, 1999.
- Mirror to America. The Autobiography of John Hope Franklin. Farrar, Straus & Giroux, 2005, ISBN 978-0-374-29944-6
