= Clancy M. Warren =

American politician

26th Mayor of Tulsa
- In office 1952–1954
- Preceded by: George H. Stoner
- Succeeded by: L. C. Clark

Tulsa Municipal Judge
- In office 1950–1952

Personal details
- Born: Clarence McGregor Warren; January 15, 1907 Chelsea, Indian Territory, U.S.
- Died: April 12, 1983 (aged 76) Okmulgee, Oklahoma, U.S.
- Party: Republican
- Education: University of Missouri; University of Oklahoma College of Law

Clancy M. Warren was an American politician who served as the 26th Mayor of Tulsa between 1952 and 1954. He served as municipal judge from 1950 to 1952.

== Biography ==
Clarence McGregor Warren was born in Chelsea, Indian Territory, on January 15, 1907, to J. Sutcliffe Warren and Mildred McGregor. He graduated from Tulsa Public Schools, the University of Missouri and the University of Oklahoma College of Law. He joined the Oklahoma Bar Association in 1931. He worked as a private practice attorney until World War II, when he joined the United States Army and served from 1942 to 1946. On October 2, 1942, he married Elizabeth Henderson and the couple had two children. From 1950 to 1952, he served as municipal judge for Tulsa. From 1952 to 1954, he served as the Mayor of Tulsa. He was a member of the Republican Party. He died on April 12, 1983, in Okmulgee, Oklahoma.
