= John Simmons (Oklahoma politician) =

American politician (died 1940)

John H. Simmons
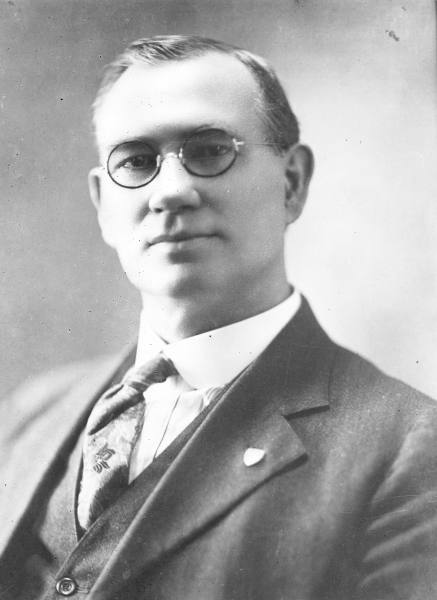
- Simmons, c. 1916

13th Mayor of Tulsa
- In office 1916–1918
- Preceded by: Frank M. Wooden
- Succeeded by: C. H. Hubbard

Member of the Oklahoma House of Representatives from the Tulsa and Creek County district
- In office 1909–1911
- Preceded by: Woodson Norvell
- Succeeded by: W. V. Pryor

Personal details
- Born: Edinburgh, Indiana, U.S.
- Died: October 18, 1940 (aged 81) Tulsa, Oklahoma, U.S.
- Resting place: Rose Hill Mausoleum
- Party: Republican
- Spouse: Margaret
- Children: 4
- Occupation: Politician; banker

John H. Simmons (died October 18, 1940) was an American politician who served as the 13th Mayor of Tulsa from 1916 to 1918.

== Early life ==
John H. Simmons was born in Edinburgh, Indiana. He was educated in Springfield, Missouri, and graduated from Henderson Academy near Springfield.

== Career ==
After graduating, Simmons became a deputy clerk in Wright County, Missouri. He organized the Wright County Bank in Hartville, Missouri. In 1902, he moved to Oklahoma and organized the Cleveland National Bank. He served as its president until he moved to Tulsa, Oklahoma, in 1906. He served as president of the City National Bank in Tulsa until its consolidation with the First National Bank. He then served as vice president of the First National Bank.

Simmons represented the Tulsa and Creek County district of the Oklahoma House of Representatives from 1909 to 1911. A member of the Republican Party, he was preceded in office by Woodson Norvell and succeeded by W. V. Pryor.

Simmons ran for mayor of Tulsa as a Republican in 1912 against the Democratic Party's nominee Frank M. Wooden. He served as the 13th Mayor of Tulsa from 1916 to 1918. He was mayor while the Tulsa Municipal Building at Fourth and Cincinnati was being built and during the Tulsa Outrage in 1917. After his term, he was appointed by Governor Robert L. Williams to the Tulsa district exemption board during World War I. He was a charter member of the commercial club in Tulsa, later the chamber of commerce.

Simmons purchased considerable property in Tulsa. In his later years, he spent time in the administration of his real estate and oil properties. He gave US$2,500 towards the construction of Hotel Tulsa.

== Personal life ==
Simmons married Margaret. They had two sons and two daughters, John, Hugh, Mrs. Irma Clay and Inez. He was a member of the First Christian Church.

Simmons died following a stroke at his home at 1601 South Norfolk Avenue in Tulsa on October 18, 1940, aged 81. He was interred at Rose Hill Mausoleum.
