= 2002 Tulsa mayoral election =

- March 12, 2002

Nominee	Bill LaFortune	Gary Watts
Party	Republican	Democratic
Popular vote	40,991	22,946
Percentage	62.49%	34.98%
Mayor before election
Susan Savage
Democratic
Elected Mayor
Bill LaFortune
Republican

The 2002 Tulsa mayoral election was held on March 12, 2002, in order to elect the mayor of Tulsa, Oklahoma. Partisan primary elections were held on February 5, 2002. Incumbent Democratic mayor Susan Savage decided not to run for re-election. The subsequent open seat was won by Republican nominee Bill LaFortune.

== Republican primary ==
=== Candidates ===
- Bill LaFortune
- Carlton Pearson
- Terry A. Simonson
- Bill J. Tims Sr.
- Scott Vostad
- Don Gibson
- Stephen R. Smith
- Ray McCollum

=== Results ===
Eight Republicans ran in the primary on February 5, 2002, with Bill LaFortune emerging as the frontrunner and winning the nomination with an undisclosed number of votes.

== Democratic primary ==
=== Candidates ===
- Gary Watts
- James Alexander Jr.
- Accountability Burns
- James O. Desmond Jr.

=== Results ===
Four Democrats ran in the primary on February 5, 2002, with Gary Watts emerging as the frontrunner and winning the nomination with an undisclosed number of votes.

== Independents ==
=== Candidates ===
- Milton T. Goodwin
- Paul C. Tay
- Lawrence Kirkpatrick

== General election ==
The general election was held on March 12, 2002. Republican nominee Bill LaFortune won the election by a margin of 18,045 votes against his foremost opponent Democratic candidate Gary Watts, thereby gaining Republican control over the office of Mayor of Tulsa, Oklahoma.

=== Results ===
2002 Tulsa mayoral election
Party	Candidate	Votes	%
Republican	Bill LaFortune	40,991	62.49
Democratic	Gary Watts	22,946	34.98
Independent	Paul C. Tay	857	1.31
Independent	Milton T. Goodwin	503	0.77
Independent	Lawrence Kirkpatrick	295	0.45
Total votes		65,592	100.00
Republican gain from Democratic			
