= Lee Price (politician) =

American politician

23rd Mayor of Tulsa
- In office 1946–1948
- Preceded by: Olney F. Flynn
- Succeeded by: Roy M. Lundy

Personal details
- Political party: Republican

Lee Price Jr. was an American politician who served as the 23rd Mayor of Tulsa from 1946 to 1948.

== Biography ==
Price served as the 23rd Mayor of Tulsa from 1946 to 1948. A Republican, he lost his re-election campaign to Roy M. Lundy.
