= John O. Mitchell =

American politician

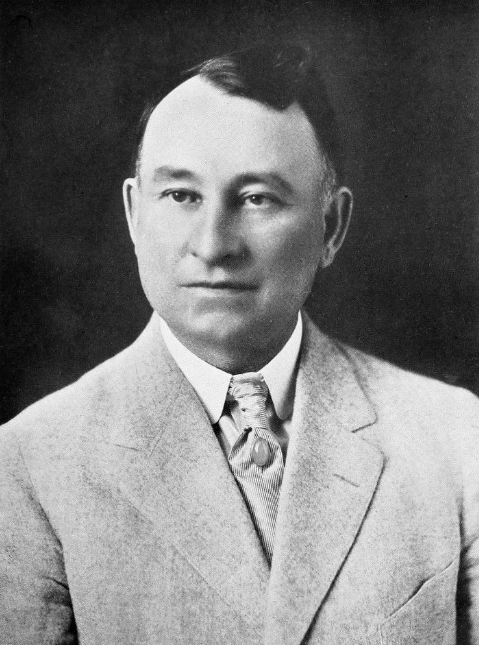

8th and 10th Mayor of Tulsa
- In office 1909–1910
- Preceded by: William E. Rohde
- Succeeded by: L. J. Martin
- In office 1906–1907
- Preceded by: Charles LaFayette Reeder
- Succeeded by: William E. Rohde

Personal details
- Born: October 22, 1858 (Note: Other sources give birth years of 1859 and 1862. Census records give his age as 12 in June 1870, 21 in June 1880, and 41 in June 1900. His gravestone gives a birth year of 1858.) Dade County, Missouri, U.S.
- Died: July 1, 1921 (aged 62) Tulsa, Oklahoma, U.S.
- Party: Democratic
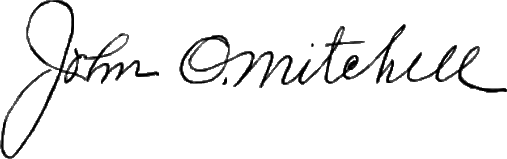
- Signature

John O. Mitchell (October 22, 1858 – July 1, 1921) was an American politician who served as the 8th and 10th Mayor of Tulsa. He was the first mayor to be elected to non-consecutive terms. He invested heavily in west Tulsa real estate. He is one of two mayors, the other being Herman Frederick Newblock, who served non-consecutive terms.

== Biography ==
John O. Mitchell was born in Dade County, Missouri on October 22, 1858.

He died at his home in Tulsa on July 1, 1921.
