= Clarence H. Veale =

American politician

21st Mayor of Tulsa
- In office 1940–1944
- Preceded by: T. A. Penney
- Succeeded by: Olney F. Flynn

Personal details
- Born: South Dakota, U.S.
- Died: February 12, 1948 Tulsa, Oklahoma, U.S.

Clarence H. Veale was the 21st Mayor of Tulsa between 1940 and 1944.

== Biography ==
Clarence H. Veale was born in South Dakota. He later moved to Iowa before finally settling in Oklahoma in 1911. He was a businessman before being drafted to succeed T. A. Penney as Mayor of Tulsa in 1940. His main focus in office was industrializing Tulsa. He served until 1944. He died on February 12, 1948, in Tulsa.
