= Loyal J. Martin =

American politician

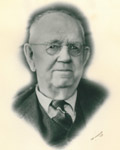

11th Mayor of Tulsa
- In office 1910–1912
- Preceded by: John O. Mitchell
- Succeeded by: Frank M. Wooden

Member of the South Dakota Senate
- In office 1901–1902
- Preceded by: D. W. Jackson
- Succeeded by: J. W. Seney
- Constituency: Miner County

Personal details
- Born: Loyal Johnston Martin; February 26, 1863 Oceola, Ohio, U.S.
- Died: April 22, 1950 (aged 87) Tulsa, Oklahoma, U.S.
- Party: Populist Party

Loyal Johnston Martin (February 16, 1863 – April 22, 1950) was an American lawyer and politician who served as the 11th Mayor of Tulsa from 1910 to 1912 and in the South Dakota Senate from 1901 to 1902.

== Biography ==
Martin was born in 1863 in Oceola, Ohio, the son of physician David Dunn Martin. The family moved to Oneida, Illinois when he was aged 3. He attended Knox College in Illinois and University of Michigan Law School. He began his law career in 1889 in Miner County, South Dakota.

He served in the South Dakota Senate between 1901 and 1902 representing Miner County as a member of the Populist Party. He later moved to Tulsa where he was the chamber of commerce president in 1903 and helped fundraise for Tulsa's first opera house. He served as the 11th Mayor of Tulsa from 1910 to 1912 and later as a judge of the Superior Court of Tulsa County from 1920 to 1923.
