= James M. Hewgley Jr. =

American politician (1916–2011)

30th Mayor of Tulsa
- In office 1966–1970
- Preceded by: James L. Maxwell
- Succeeded by: Robert J. LaFortune

Personal details
- Born: James Marion Hewgley Jr. November 8, 1916 Gallatin, Tennessee, U.S.
- Died: May 17, 2011 (aged 94)
- Party: Republican Party (after 1956)
- Other political affiliations: Democratic Party (before 1956)

James Marion Hewgley Jr. (November 8, 1916 – May 17, 2011) was the Mayor of Tulsa from 1966 to 1970.

== Biography ==
James Marion Hewgley Jr. was born on November 8, 1916, in Gallatin, Tennessee. He was the son of an oil drilling contractor who worked for Thomas Baker Slick Sr. His family moved to Tulsa in 1920 and later Oklahoma City where he graduated from Classen High School. He graduated from the University of Oklahoma in 1938. A Democrat until he switched his affiliation to the Republican Party in 1956, he first entered politics working on the U.S. Senate campaign for Bud Wilkinson. In 1966, Hewgley was elected Mayor of Tulsa after defeating incumbent James L. Maxwell. Shortly after his election, the city annexed 100 square miles of land, doubling the city's area. Maxwell helped establish the Port of Catoosa, Tulsa Transit Authority, and Tulsa Housing Authority. On July 16, 1969, Hewgley watched the Apollo 11 launch from Cape Kennedy, Florida, alongside Oklahoma Governor Dewey Bartlett, University of Tulsa President Paschal Twyman, and North American Rockwell executive Harry Todd.

After leaving office, Hewgley ran against Congressman James R. Jones and lost in 1972. He was named to the Oklahoma Hall of Fame in 1984 and the Tulsa Hall of Fame in 1993. His son, James Hewgley III, served on the Tulsa City Commission.

Political offices
Preceded by James L. Maxwell	30th Mayor of Tulsa; 1966-1970	Succeeded by Robert J. LaFortune
