= George L. Watkins =

American football player, coach, and politician (1886–1962)

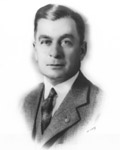

18th Mayor of Tulsa
- In office 1930–1932
- Preceded by: Dan W. Patton
- Succeeded by: Herman Frederick Newblock

Personal details
- Born: June 8, 1886 Faunsdale, Alabama, U.S.
- Died: March 14, 1962 (aged 75) Tulsa, Oklahoma, U.S.
- Party: Democratic
- Coaching career

Playing career

Football
- 1904–1906: Sewanee
- Position: Center

Coaching career (HC unless noted)

Football
- 1907: Louisiana Tech
- 1914: Sewanee (assistant)

Baseball
- 1908: Louisiana Tech

George LeGrande Watkins (June 8, 1886 – March 14, 1962) was an American college football player and coach and the mayor of Tulsa, Oklahoma from 1930 to 1932. In 1959, Watkins was made chairman of the Tulsa County Excise Board by the Oklahoma Tax Commission.

== Sewanee ==
Watkins was a prominent center for the Sewanee Tigers football teams of Sewanee: The University of the South, a small Episcopal school in the mountains of Tennessee. He thrice made All-Southern. Watkins was unanimously selected captain of the 1906 team. He is the second-team center on Sewanee's all-time team, behind Frank Juhan. At Sewanee he was a member of the Phi Delta Theta fraternity.

== Louisiana Tech ==
Watkins was an athletic coach instructor in math and history at Louisiana Industrial Institute—now known as Louisiana Tech University during the 1907–08 year. As football coach, he led the 1907 Louisiana Industrial football team to a record of 9–1. He was also the school's baseball coach in the spring of 1908.

== Mayor of Tulsa ==
Watkins was elected the 18th Mayor of Tulsa between 1930 and 1932.

== Head coaching record ==
=== Football ===
Year	Team	Overall	Conference	Standing	Bowl/playoffs
Louisiana Industrial (Independent) (1907)
1907	Louisiana Industrial	9–1			
Louisiana Industrial:		9–1			
Total:		9–1			
