= Roy M. Lundy =

American politician

24th Mayor of Tulsa
- In office 1948–1950
- Preceded by: Lee Price
- Succeeded by: George H. Stoner

Personal details
- Political party: Democratic Party

Roy M. Lundy was an American politician who served as the 24th Mayor of Tulsa from 1948 to 1950.

== Biography ==
Lundy, a Democrat was elected Mayor of Tulsa in 1948 after defeating incumbent mayor Lee Price. He served in office until 1950.
