= H. R. Cline =

American politician

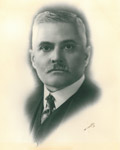

6th Mayor of Tulsa
- In office 1904–1905
- Preceded by: George Mowbray
- Succeeded by: Charles LaFayette Reeder

Personal details
- Political party: Democratic

H.R. Cline was an American politician who served as the sixth Mayor of Tulsa from 1904 to 1905. He was a real estate investor and businessman before his election. During his tenure he secured private funding for the 11th Street Bridge and converted the Tulsa Fire Department from a volunteer to a paid fire department.
