= William E. Rohde =

American politician

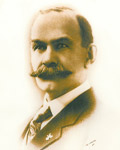

9th Mayor of Tulsa
- In office 1907–1909
- Preceded by: John O. Mitchell
- Succeeded by: John O. Mitchell

Member of the Colorado House of Representatives
- In office 1897–1898
- Constituency: El Paso County

Personal details
- Born: 1859 Redford, Michigan, U.S.
- Died: May 1934 (aged 74–75) Tulsa, Oklahoma, U.S
- Party: Populist Party

William E. Rohde (1859 – May 1934) was an American politician who served as the 9th Mayor of Tulsa between 1907 and 1909 and in the Colorado House of Representatives between 1897 and 1898.

== Biography ==
William E. Rohde was born in Redford, Michigan in 1859. He was elected to the Colorado House of Representatives as a member of the Populist Party representing El Paso County in 1897 and served until 1898. He lived in Victor. He later moved to Tulsa, Oklahoma where he was elected mayor in 1907. He led the town during Oklahoma statehood, converted roads from brick to asphalt, and built a water plant and distribution system. He died in May 1934 in Tulsa.
