= T. D. Evans =

American politician

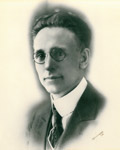

15th Mayor of Tulsa
- In office 1920–1922
- Preceded by: C. H. Hubbard
- Succeeded by: Herman Frederick Newblock

Tulsa Municipal Court Judge
- In office May 1917 – 1920

Personal details
- Party: Republican

T. D. Evans was an American lawyer, judge, and the Mayor of Tulsa during the Tulsa race massacre.

== Biography ==
Evans was appointed municipal judge for the city of Tulsa in May 1917 and was the judge who oversaw the Tulsa Outrage.

Evans campaigned for Mayor of Tulsa in 1920 on a single issue platform: approve the Spavinaw Water Project. He was considered a compromise candidate, having previously served as municipal judge. He defeated Edward E. Short in the Republican primary with 1,275 votes to Short's 885 votes. (Note: The Black Wall Street Times erroneously reported Evans was a Democrat in 2021; The Tulsa Tribune and other coverage from the 1920 election described Evans as a Republican candidate.) He went on to defeat incumbent Charles D. Hubbard with 4,891 votes to Hubbard's 4,684 votes.

T. D. Evans was the Mayor of Tulsa from 1920 to 1922. He was mayor during the 1921 Tulsa race massacre. After the massacre, he blamed it on a "negro uprising" and advocated for building a railroad and rail station in the Greenwood District. In an official letter to the council date June 14, 1921, Evans proposed relocated Tulsa's African American community to the northeast and rezoning Greenwood for industrial use. Evans proposal was not fully implemented due to lawsuits filed by Buck Colbert Franklin and the district started rebuilding within a year of the massacre.
