= Woodward Park (Tulsa) =

Park, botanical garden, and arboretum in Tulsa, Oklahoma, United States

Coordinates: 36.1316°N 95.9738°W

- Woodward Park and Gardens Historic District
- U.S. National Register of Historic Places
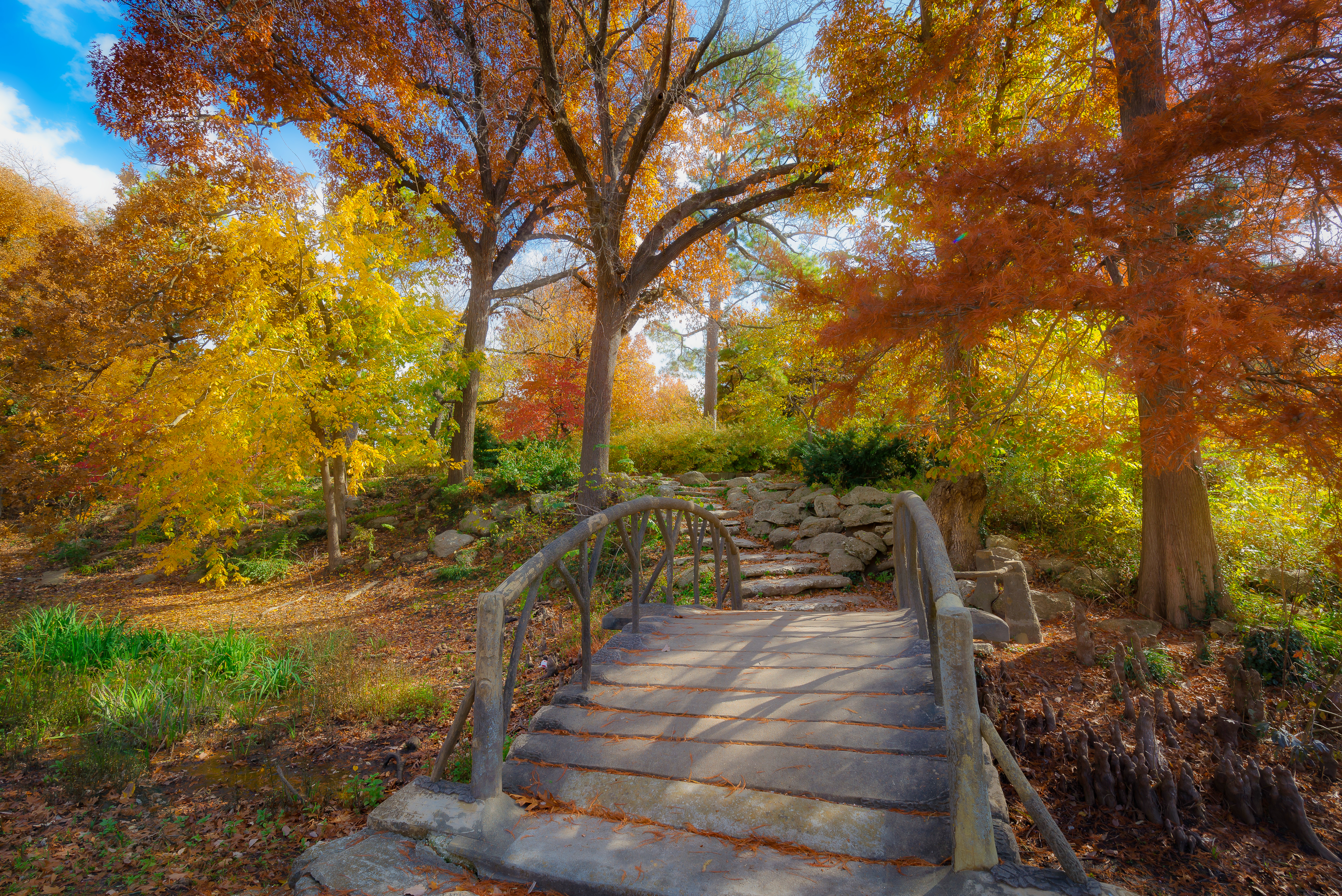
- Location: 2324 S. Rockford, Tulsa, Oklahoma
- Built: 1933 - 1934
- Architect: G. Burton Fox
- NRHP reference No.: 14000054

Significant dates
- Added to NRHP: March 11, 2014
- Designated: Historic District

Woodward Park is a 45-acre (18 ha) public park, botanical garden, and arboretum located between 21st Street and 24th Street east of South Peoria Avenue and west of South Rockford Street in Tulsa, Oklahoma, in the Midwestern United States. The park, named for Helen Woodward, the original property owner, was established in 1929, after a lengthy court suit over ownership.

The park was designed to provide its visitors experience with a variety of horticultural subjects. It contains a number of specialty gardens, including those featuring spring flowers, tropical plants and cacti, the Tulsa Rose Garden, the Tulsa Garden Center, and the Tulsa Arboretum. The park is particularly known for its azaleas, as well as tulips, irises, dogwoods, and redbuds. The Rose Garden (established 1935) features over 9,000 roses of over 250 varieties.

The park was added to the National Register of Historic Places on March 11, 2014 as Woodward Park and Gardens Historic District. Its areas of significance are listed as Landscape Architecture, Architecture, and Education/Recreation.

== History ==
The city of Tulsa purchased a 45-acre (18 ha) tract of land in 1909 for $100 an acre from Herbert Woodward. This area, then outside the city limits, called "Perryman's pasture," was part of a 160-acre allotment that Helen Woodward, a mixed-blood Creek Indian, had received from the Five Civilized Tribes Indian Commission. Her mother was a full-blood Creek and belonged to the Lochapoka tribe. She was 14 years old, under legal age, when her white father and guardian, Herbert Woodward, sold the land without her consent. Tulsa had condemned the site with the intent of creating a public park. In 1925, Helen, then known as Helen Slemp, sued Tulsa, trying to recover ownership of the land. The suit lasted for four years before the court decided in favor of the city. According to the Tulsa World, "The opinion ended one of the hardest fought land suits in the history of the city and decided a question which has been before Oklahoma courts for years. The principal question involved was the right of the city to condemn for public purposes land lying" outside the city limits.

Construction work began in November 1933, using workers provided by the new Civil Works Agency, a New Deal program. The Federal Emergency Relief Administration, another New Deal agency, took over the work in April 1934.

After gaining clear title to the land, Tulsa hired G. Burton Fox, a Tulsa landscape artist, to design the park. Woodward Park includes the Tulsa Rose Garden, the Tulsa Garden Center, the Tulsa Arboretum, and the Linnaeus Teaching Gardens. The Tulsa Historical Society is housed in the former Samuel Travis Mansion, which was acquired by the Tulsa Historical Society in 1997 and is not a part of Woodward Park. The Samuel Travis mansion and its 3.2 acres (1.3 ha) grounds are at the southeast corner of Peoria Avenue and 21st Street.

Helen Woodward Slemp retained the rest of her headright land, which extended eastward from Utica to Lewis streets. She continued to live in Tulsa a few blocks from Woodward Park. She sold a 40-acre (16 ha) tract at 21st and Utica in 1946 for $95,600. This tract subsequently became the site of the Utica Square shopping center. She died in Tulsa in 1952.

In November of 2026, a yearlong $6.77-million-dollar renovation effort was completed on the north end of the park. Changes included reconstruction of the hillside and four ponds, additions of boulders and landscaping near pathways, and planting of additional flowers, shrubs and trees.

== Tulsa Rose Garden ==
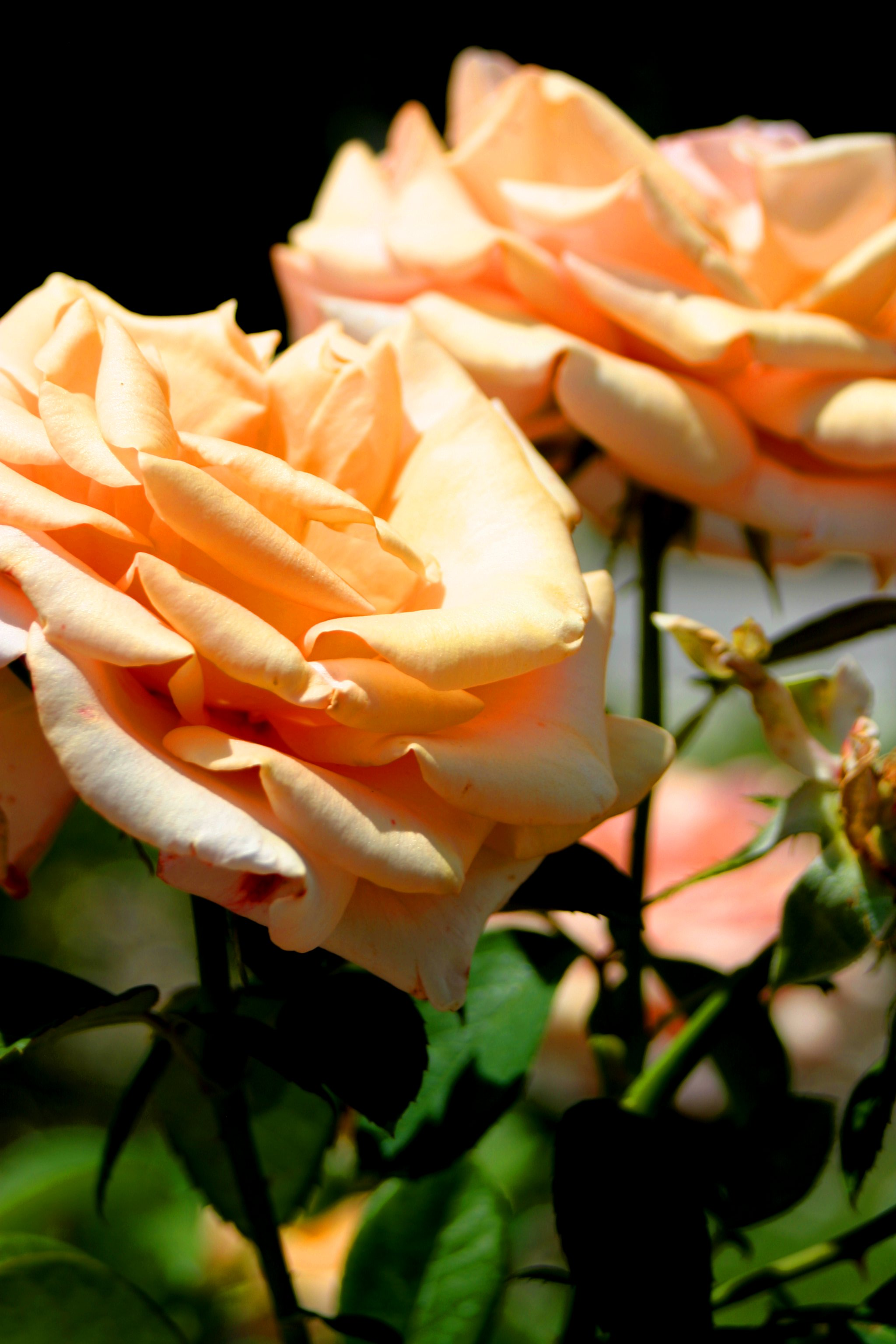
Roses on display.

The Tulsa Municipal Rose Garden was begun in 1935 as a Works Progress Administration (WPA) project. It was designed to have five terraces, which were constructed on a hillside by manual labor and horses. The terrace levels have stone walls and steps, with the walls covered by English Ivy. According to the Tulsa Garden Society, the Rose Garden contains about 5,000 rose plants representing 250 varieties.

The rose garden may be the best known element of Woodward Park. In 1937, the Better Homes and Garden magazine presented a plaque to the Tulsa Garden Club for the achievement.

The rose display has recently been adversely affected by rose rosette, a virus carried by wind-borne mites. The virus had killed almost two-thirds of the plants by April 2014. According to the Tulsa park horticulturist who oversees the garden, Mark Linholm, new species of roses that are more resistant to this virus would be planted in 2015. Linholm said that the garden would diversify to include entirely different plants, although it will still feature roses.

== Linnaeus Garden ==
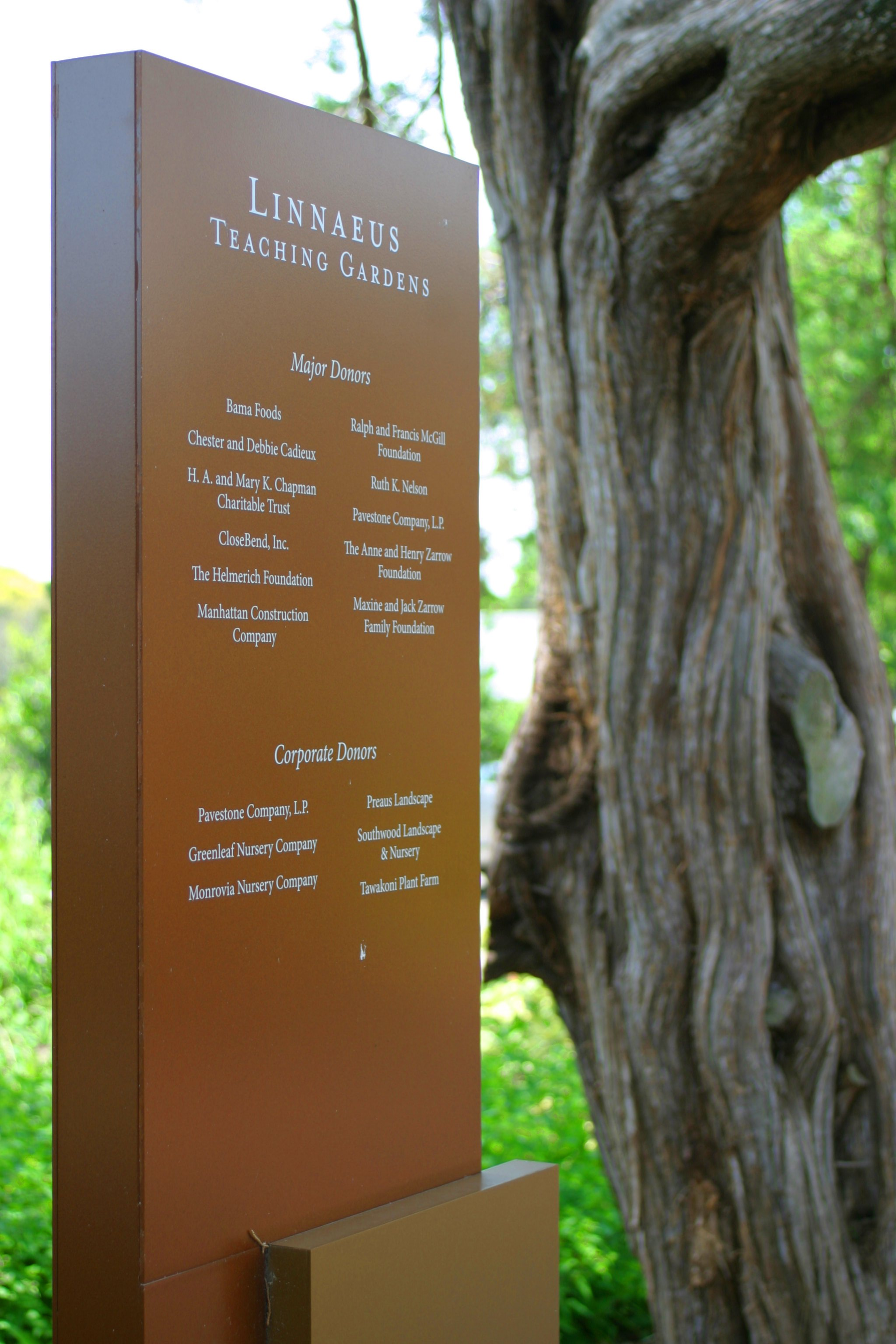
Linnaeus Teaching Garden plaque in Woodward Park

In 2005, the Parks Department approved using 1.5 acres (0.61 ha) for construction of the Linnaeus Teaching Garden, a program of the Tulsa Garden Center. The purpose of the garden was to teach homeowners ways to improve the horticulture of their own homes by demonstrating successful techniques for growing flowers, vegetables, shrubs and groundcovers at home. The garden was named for the Swedish botanist Carl Linnaeus, and dedicated on June 8, 2006.

== Anne Hathaway Herb Garden ==
Jewel Huffman, a Tulsa resident, and the Anne Hathaway Herb Garden Club are credited with starting a formal herb garden in Woodward Park during 1939. Both the garden and the club were named for Anne Hathaway, the wife of English playwright William Shakespeare. According to the Tulsa Garden Center, Hathaway "...was renowned for her love of gardening and her cultivation of culinary herbs...".

The Anne Hathaway Herb Garden Club retained responsibility for maintaining the herb garden until 1982, when they relinquished it to the Tulsa Parks Department horticulture division. Varieties exhibited have included,"... geraniums, sages, mints, basil, summer and winter savory, lemon thyme, burnett [sic], rosemary, marjoram, oregano and tarragon..."

== Rock Gardens ==
The Upper and Lower Rock Garden areas were created in 1930, north of the herb garden. The Upper Rock Garden employs honeycomb limestone rocks placed to simulate a stream and small springs. The area has a walkway made of rock, with benches, fountains, bridges and statuary. Seasonal flower plantings provide year-round blooms. The Lower Rock Garden was planted during the 1960s and 1970s with a very large number of azalea plants. These generally bloom between mid-March and mid-April, creating a mass of color.

== Tulsa Arboretum ==
The Arboretum has 270 different species of shrubs and trees that are native to Oklahoma. It covers about 3 acres (1.2 ha) of Woodward Park. It is a popular venue for dog walking, but the animals must be kept on a leash or obedient to the owner's verbal command.

== Tulsa Garden Center (David R. Travis Mansion) ==
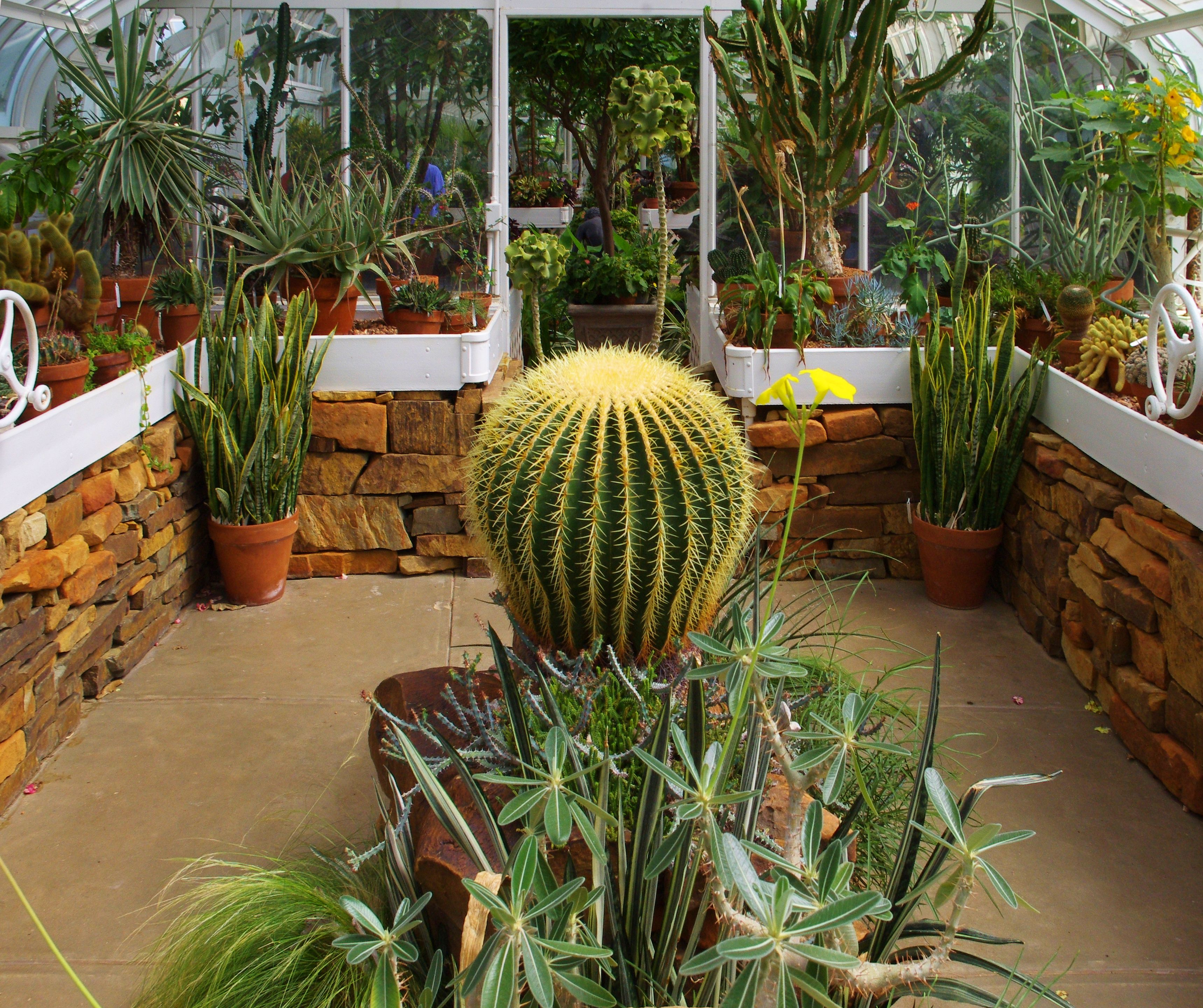
Inside part of the conservatory.

The former David R. Travis mansion now houses the Tulsa Garden Center. The mansion was built in 1919, just south of the Tulsa Rose Garden on Peoria. The 21-room house sat on a 13-acre (5.3 ha) lot immediately south of Woodward Park. J. Arthur Hull bought the property in 1923 and added the conservatory and garden. He sold the property to George Snedden in 1932, and his wife lived in the house until her death until 1949 (George died in 1934).

William Skelly bought the house in 1950, but never moved into it. He sold the property to the city in 1954. The city added the property to Woodward Park, "... providing an educational resource center and a meeting place for horticultural and environmental organizations in Tulsa and surrounding communities."

== Museum of Tulsa History ==
Samuel Travis built a mansion in 1919 immediately south of his brother David's estate. The two homes were designed to be complementary by the same architect and at the same time. Samuel's house sat on a 3.2-acre (1.3 ha) lot. It remained a private residence until 1997, when the Tulsa Historical Society (THS) bought it with funds provided by the Tulsa Tribune foundation. Prior to the sale, a real estate developer planned to buy the property, raze the mansion and build a housing development on the land. THS renovated the original 11,000-square-foot (1,000 m^{2}) structure and added a 17,000-square-foot (1,600 m^{2}) wing after the purchase, to make it suitable as an office and museum. A grand opening occurred January 28, 2008, In 2025, the facility was rebranded from the Tulsa Historical Society & Museum to the Museum of Tulsa History (MOTH). MOTH contains a collection of hundreds of thousands of still photographs, books, documents, architectural elements, and general artifacts from Tulsa’s history.

== Appeal to the Great Spirit ==
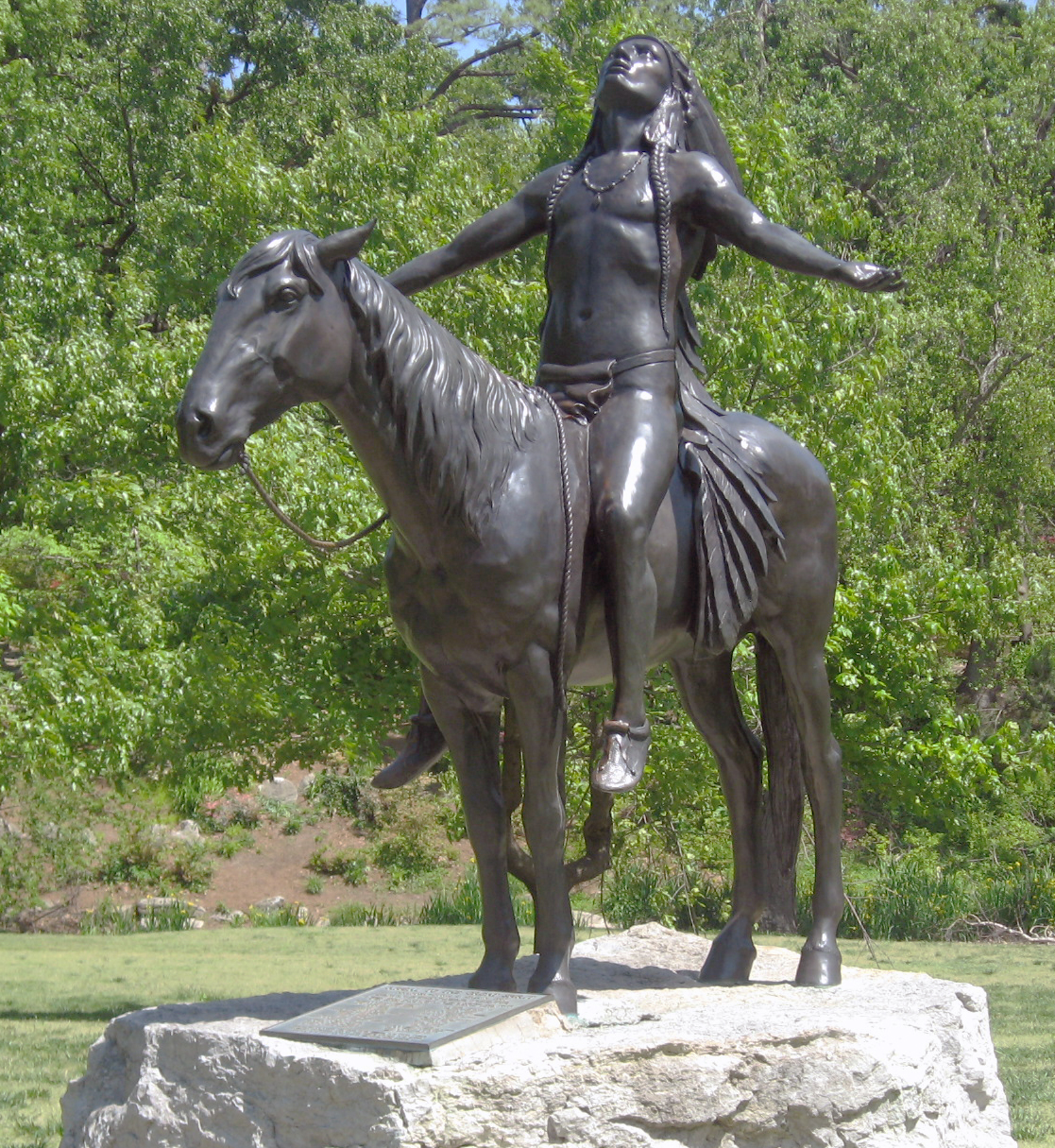
Appeal to the Great Spirit (ca. 1909, this cast 1985), by Cyrus Dallin, Woodward Park

A one-third-size plaster version of sculptor Cyrus Dallin's Appeal to the Great Spirit was donated to Tulsa Central High School in 1923. It stood in the school's main hall until 1976, when Central closed its doors.

The Appeal to the Great Spirit was moved to the new Central High School on West Edison, and sits in the hall of the east entrance to the school. That plaster sculpture was used as a model for a full size bronze version, which was installed in Woodward Park in 1985.

== National Register of Historic Places ==
The park was added to the National Register of Historic Places on March 11, 2014 as Woodward Park and Gardens Historic District. Its areas of significance are listed as Landscape Architecture, Architecture, and Education/Recreation. The full application for the registry is available online.

== See also ==
- List of botanical gardens in the United States
