= List of mayors of Tulsa, Oklahoma =

Mayor of Tulsa
- Seal of City of Tulsa

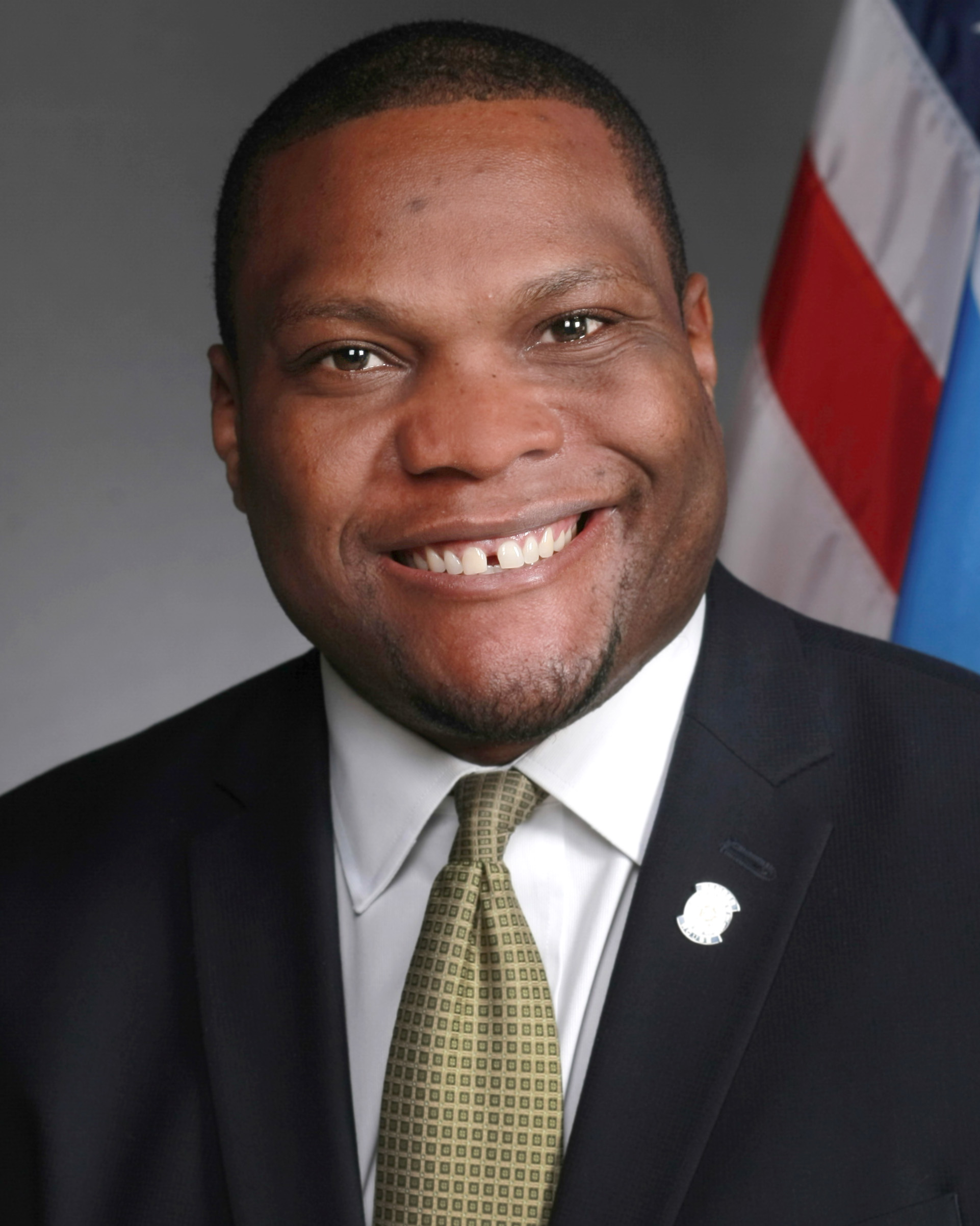
- Incumbent; Monroe Nichols since December 2, 2024
- Term length: Four years
- Website: Mayor of Tulsa

This is a list of mayors of Tulsa, a city in the U.S. state of Oklahoma. Mayors of Tulsa are elected for four year terms.

== Mayors of Tulsa ==
No.	Portrait	Mayor	Took office	Left office	Tenure	Party	Election
1		Edward E. Calkins (1836–1911)	1898	1899	1 year	Republican	1898
2		R. N. Bynum (1858–1927)	1899	1900	1 year	Republican	TBA
3		Lewis Poe (1863–1941)	1900	1901	1 year	Democratic	1900
4		George D. Blakey (TBA–1913)	1901	1903	2 years	Republican	TBA
5		George Mowbray (1847–1910)	1903	1904	1 year	Republican	TBA
6		H. R. Cline (TBA–TBA)	1904	1905	1 year	Democratic	TBA
7		Charles LaFayette Reeder (1862–1926)	1905	1906	1 year	Democratic	TBA
8		John O. Mitchell (1858–1921); 1st time	1906	1907	1 year	Democratic	TBA
9		William E. Rohde (1859–1934)	1907	1909	2 years	Democratic	TBA
10		John O. Mitchell (1858–1921); 2nd time	1909	1910	1 year	Democratic	TBA
11		Loyal J. Martin (1863–1950)	1910	1912	2 years	Democratic	TBA
12		Frank M. Wooden (TBA–TBA)	1912	1916 (Note: Impeached and removed from office.)	4 years	Democratic	TBA
13		John Simmons (?–1940)	1916	1918	2 years	Republican	TBA
14		C. H. Hubbard (TBA–TBA)	1918	1920	2 years	Democratic	TBA
15		T. D. Evans (TBA–TBA)	1920	1922	2 years	Republican	1920
16		Herman Frederick Newblock (1867–1957); 1st time	1922	1928	6 years	Democratic	1922
16		Herman Frederick Newblock (1867–1957); 1st time	1922	1928	6 years	Democratic	TBA
17		Dan W. Patton (1885–1963)	1928	1930	2 years	Republican	1928
18		George L. Watkins (1886–1962)	1930	1932	2 years	Democratic	TBA
19		Herman Frederick Newblock (1867–1957); 2nd time	1932	1934	2 years	Democratic	TBA
20		T. A. Penney (TBA–TBA)	1934	1940	6 years	Democratic	TBA
21		Clarence H. Veale (?–1948)	1940	1944	4 years	Democratic	TBA
22		Olney F. Flynn (1895–1970)	1944	1946	2 years	Republican	TBA
23		Lee Price (TBA–TBA)	1946	1948	2 years	Republican	TBA
24		Roy M. Lundy (TBA–TBA)	1948	1950	2 years	Democratic	TBA
25		George H. Stoner (1887–1966)	1950	1952	2 years	Republican	TBA
26		Clancy M. Warren (1907–1983)	1952	1954	2 years	Republican	TBA
27		L. C. Clark (1893–1977)	1954	1956	2 years	Republican	TBA
28		George E. Norvell (1907–1990)	1956	1958	2 years	Democratic	TBA
29		James Maxwell (1926–1984)	May 6, 1958	May 3, 1966	7 years, 362 days	Democratic	1958
29		James Maxwell (1926–1984)	May 6, 1958	May 3, 1966	7 years, 362 days	Democratic	1960
29		James Maxwell (1926–1984)	May 6, 1958	May 3, 1966	7 years, 362 days	Democratic	1962
29		James Maxwell (1926–1984)	May 6, 1958	May 3, 1966	7 years, 362 days	Democratic	1964
30		James M. Hewgley Jr. (1916–2011)	1966	1970	4 years	Republican	1966
30		James M. Hewgley Jr. (1916–2011)	1966	1970	4 years	Republican	TBA
31		Robert J. LaFortune (1927–2024)	1970	1978	8 years	Republican	TBA
32		Jim Inhofe (1934–2024)	1978	1984	6 years	Republican	1978
32		Jim Inhofe (1934–2024)	1978	1984	6 years	Republican	1980
32		Jim Inhofe (1934–2024)	1978	1984	6 years	Republican	1982
33		Terry Young (TBA–TBA)	1984	1986	2 years	Democratic	1984
34		Dick Crawford (TBA–TBA)	1986	1988	2 years	Republican	TBA
35		Rodger Randle (born 1943)	1988	July 13, 1992 (Note: Resigned.)	3–4 years	Democratic	1988
36		M. Susan Savage (born 1952)	1992	March 31, 2002	9–10 years	Democratic	1992 special
36		M. Susan Savage (born 1952)	1992	March 31, 2002	9–10 years	Democratic	TBA
37		Bill LaFortune (born 1957)	April 1, 2002	April 10, 2006	4 years, 9 days	Republican	2002
38		Kathy Taylor (born 1955)	April 10, 2006	December 6, 2009	3 years, 240 days	Democratic	2006
39		Dewey F. Bartlett Jr. (born 1947)	December 7, 2009	December 4, 2016	6 years, 363 days	Republican	2009
39		Dewey F. Bartlett Jr. (born 1947)	December 7, 2009	December 4, 2016	6 years, 363 days	Republican	2013
40		G. T. Bynum (born 1977)	December 5, 2016	December 2, 2024	7 years, 363 days	Republican	2016
40		G. T. Bynum (born 1977)	December 5, 2016	December 2, 2024	7 years, 363 days	Republican	2020
41		Monroe Nichols (born 1983)	December 2, 2024	Incumbent	1 year, 279 days	Democratic	2024

== See also ==
- Timeline of Tulsa, Oklahoma
