= T. A. Penney =

American politician

20th Mayor of Tulsa
- In office 1934–1940
- Preceded by: Herman Frederick Newblock
- Succeeded by: Clarence H. Veale

T. A. Penney was an American politician who served as the 20th Mayor of Tulsa between 1934 and 1940. He set up a business advisory board for city government and improved the city's juvenile court system. He was very active in the U.S. Conference of Mayors.
