= C. H. Hubbard =

American politician

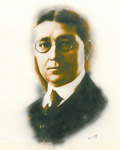

14th Mayor of Tulsa
- In office 1918–1920
- Preceded by: John Simmons
- Succeeded by: T. D. Evans

C. H. Hubbard was an American politician who served as the 14th Mayor of Tulsa from 1918 to 1920.

== Biography ==
C. H. Hubbard was the Mayor of Tulsa between 1918 and 1920. During his tenure, the Spanish flu epidemic, which killed approximately 7,359 Oklahomans, hit Tulsa. After three to four thousand cases were reported in Tulsa, he closed businesses and schools to slow the spread of the disease.

== See also ==
- G.T. Bynum, Mayor of Tulsa during the COVID-19 pandemic
