= Frank M. Wooden =

American politician

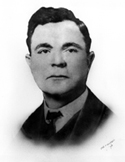

12th Mayor of Tulsa
- In office 1912–1916
- Preceded by: L. J. Martin
- Succeeded by: John Simmons

Personal details
- Political party: Democratic Party

Frank M. Wooden was an American politician who served as the 12th Mayor of Tulsa between 1912 and 1916. He is the only mayor of Tulsa to be impeached and removed from office.

== Biography ==
Frank M. Wooden, a member of the Democratic Party, was elected Mayor of Tulsa in 1912 after he defeated the Republican nominee John Simmons. He was later indicted by a grand jury for failing to enforce prohibition and bans on gambling. In 1916 he became the first, and only, mayor of Tulsa to be impeached and removed from office. He later served as a county commissioner and as the state school land commission appraiser.
