= George Mowbray =

American politician and missionary

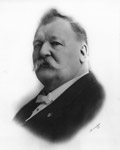

5th Mayor of Tulsa
- In office 1903–1904
- Preceded by: George D. Blakey
- Succeeded by: H. R. Cline

Personal details
- Born: July 5, 1847 Melton, Leicestershire, United Kingdom
- Died: January 12, 1910 (aged 62) Tulsa, Oklahoma, U.S.
- Party: Republican
- Education: The King's School, Grantham

George W. Mowbray (July 5, 1847 – January 12, 1910) was an American politician and missionary who served as the fifth mayor of Tulsa from 1903 to 1904.

== Early life, family, and education ==
George W. Mowbray was born on July 5, 1847, in Melton, Leicestershire, United Kingdom to John and Catherine Lockton Mowbray. He attended Grantham Grammar School and studied religion. He started preaching at sixteen and became known as "the Boy Preacher." Although raised in the Church of England, Mowbray was ordained in the Wesleyan Methodist Church. He married Hannah E. Harley in 1867 and the couple had four children who survived to adulthood: Anna, George W. Jr., Mary, and Grace. In 1869 his family immigrated to the United States and by 1886 he had moved to McCune, Kansas.

== Move to Oklahoma ==
In 1887 he moved to Tulsa as a missionary to the Muscogee Nation for the Southern Kansas Methodist Conference. In 1896 he retired from the ministry to run his late son-in-law T. J. Archer's store. He served as the fifth Mayor of Tulsa from 1903 to 1904 and was instrumental in bringing the Santa Fe Railway to Tulsa. Mowbray led the Republican ticket which swept every city office except the office of recorder. He was also the first president of the Tulsa Public Schools school board. He died on January 12, 1910.
