= George D. Blakey =

American politician

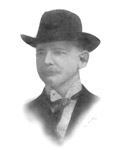

4th Mayor of Tulsa
- In office 1901–1903
- Preceded by: Lewis Poe
- Succeeded by: George Mowbray

Personal details
- Died: November 30, 1913 Evansville, Indiana, U.S.
- Party: Republican

George D. Blakey was the fourth Mayor of Tulsa from 1901 to 1903.

== Biography ==
George D. Blakey was the Republican candidate for Mayor of Tulsa in 1901. He won the April election. He is credited with helping organize the volunteer Tulsa Fire Department and pioneering the city's grid system. He died on November 30, 1913, in Evansville, Indiana.
