= Charles LaFayette Reeder =

American politician and physician

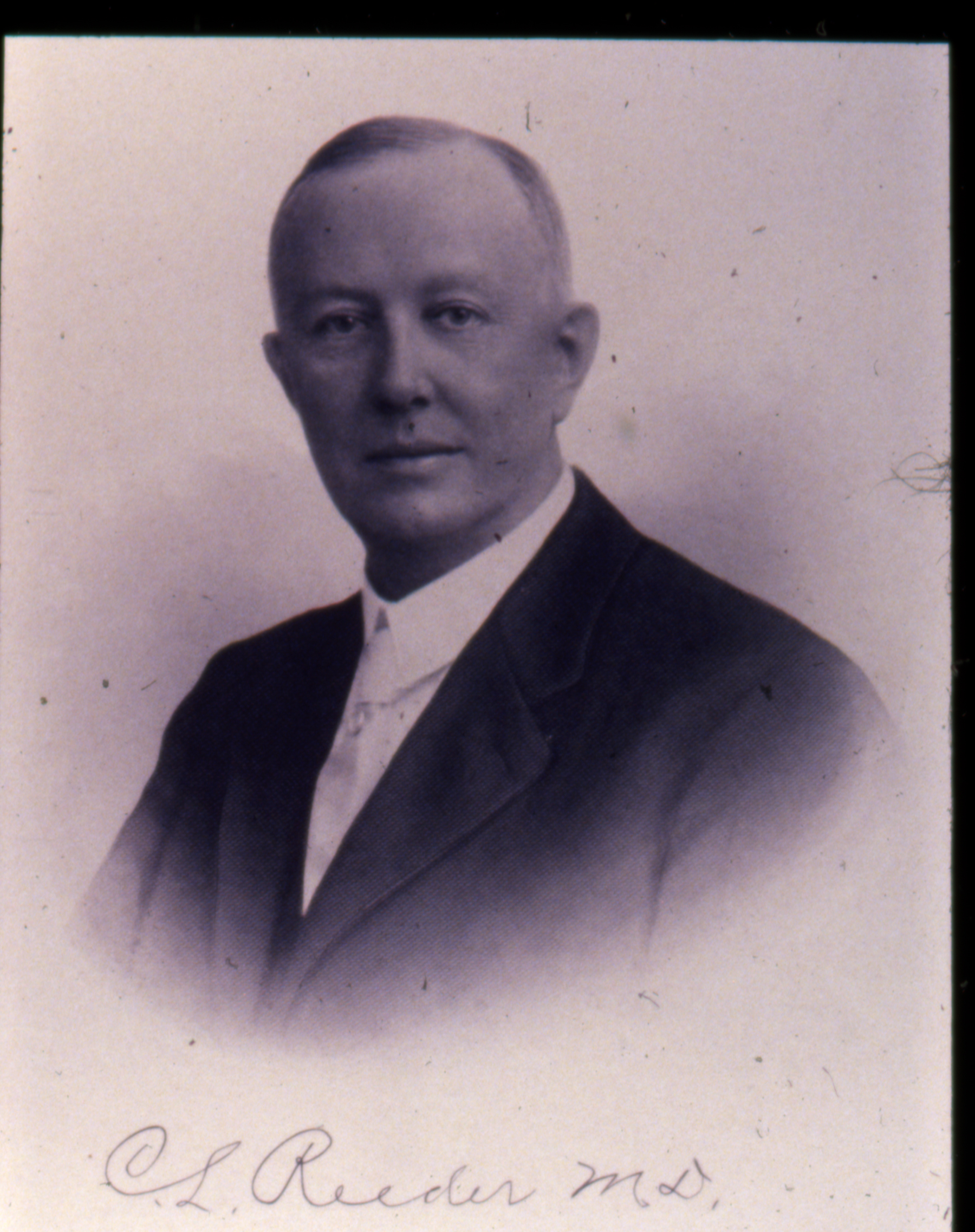

7th Mayor of Tulsa
- In office 1905–1906
- Preceded by: H. R. Cline
- Succeeded by: John O. Mitchell

Personal details
- Born: July 6, 1862 Appanoose County, Iowa, U.S.
- Died: December 20, 1926 (aged 64) St. Louis, Missouri, U.S.
- Party: Democratic

Charles LaFayette Reeder (July 6, 1862 – December 20, 1926) was an American politician and physician who served as the seventh Mayor of Tulsa from 1905 to 1906.

== Biography ==
Charles LaFayette Reeder was born on July 6, 1862, in Appanoose County, Iowa. His father, Philander Reeder, was a physician, and Charles would also become a physician. He married a woman named Jessica in 1886. In 1890 he moved to Tulsa, Indian Territory, and was one of the first practicing physicians in the city. He co-founded the city's first hospital and was later the seventh Mayor of Tulsa from 1905 to 1906. He was a member of the Democratic Party. He died on December 20, 1926, in St. Louis.
