= Herman Frederick Newblock =

American politician and police officer

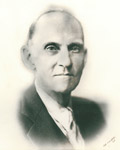

16th and 19th Mayor of Tulsa
- In office 1932–1934
- Preceded by: George L. Watkins
- Succeeded by: T. A. Penney
- In office 1922–1928
- Preceded by: T. D. Evans
- Succeeded by: Dan W. Patton

Tulsa County Sheriff
- In office October 1908 – 1911
- Preceded by: Lon Lewis

Tulsa Police Chief
- In office January 16, 1911 – May 3, 1912
- Preceded by: Charles W. Conneely
- Succeeded by: Edward Yoder
- In office August 8, 1907 – October 1, 1908
- Preceded by: Position established
- Succeeded by: Jess Sam Walker

Personal details
- Born: January 12, 1867 Pittsburgh, Pennsylvania, U.S.
- Died: August 19, 1957 (aged 90) Tulsa, Oklahoma, U.S.
- Party: Democratic Party

Herman Frederick Newblock was an American politician, Ku Klux Klansman, and police officer who served as the 16th and 19th Mayor of Tulsa from 1922 to 1928 and 1932 to 1934.

He is one of two mayors, the other being John O. Mitchell, who served non-consecutive terms. According to the city of Tulsa, he was known as "Tulsa's Grand Old Man of Politics" and Newblock Park is named after him.

== Biography ==
Herman Frederick Newblock was born on January 12, 1867, in Pittsburgh, Pennsylvania, to Henry Newblock and Elizabeth Wagner. Newblock's family moved to Missouri, Fayetteville, Arkansas, Falls County, Texas, before settling in Cleveland County, Oklahoma Territory in 1894.

He became the sheriff of Cleveland County in 1895. He briefly operated a hardware store in Sulpher, Chickasaw Nation before settling in Tulsa in 1905. He was appointed Tulsa's police chief in 1907 and served until October 1908 when he was appointed to succeed Lon Lewis as Tulsa County sheriff. In 1911 he left the sheriff's office to return to his previous position as chief of police. He left again in 1914 to work for Producers National Bank until 1917. From 1917 to 1921 he was Tulsa's finance commissioner.

In 1922 Newport, a Democrat, was elected as the 16th mayor of Tulsa in 1922 and he served until 1928. In 1922 he was part of the Ku Klux Klan's slate of candidates and the Klan endorsed him in 1924 with his opponents dubbing Grand Dragon William Shelly Rogers the "shadow mayor of Tulsa." While Newport was a member of the Klan, he declined to appear alongside other Klan endorsed candidates when ordered to attend by Rogers. On election night in April 1924, Klansmen stormed the office of the Tulsa World, which had opposed Newport.

The Spavinaw Water Project finished development during his tenure providing water for the city after 1924. In 1927, Newblock Park was named after him. He was elected to his second tenure as mayor from 1932 to 1934. He died on August 19, 1957, in Tulsa. According to the city of Tulsa, he was known as "Tulsa's Grand Old Man of Politics."

== Family ==
He married Addie Gardner on March 4, 1897.

== Works cited ==
- Schoenfeldt, Aaron (2026). "The Klan and Civic Authority in the Aftermath of the 1921 Tulsa Race Massacre". Chronicles of Oklahoma. CIV (2). Oklahoma City, Oklahoma: Oklahoma Historical Society: 149–168.
