= Tulsa Theater =

Theater and convention hall in Oklahoma, U.S.

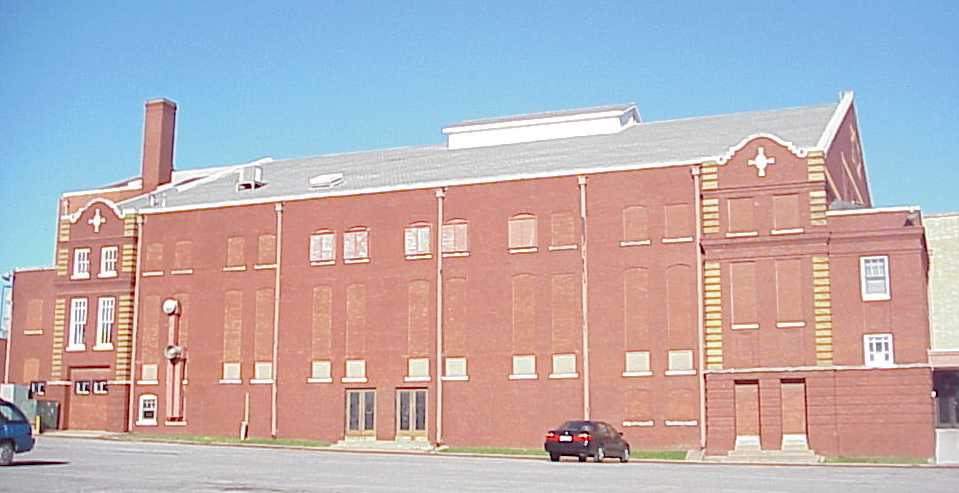
- Exterior view of the west end of the theater
- Interactive map of Tulsa Theater
- Former names: Brady Theater (1979-2019); Tulsa Municipal Theater (1952-79); Tulsa Convention Hall (1914-52)
- Address: 105 Reconciliation Way; Tulsa, OK 74103-7809
- Location: Tulsa Arts District
- Owner: Peter Mayo
- Capacity: 2,800

Construction
- Opened: October 22, 1914
- Cost: $125,000 ($4.17 million in 2025 dollars)
- Architects: Rose and Peterson

Website
- Venue Website
- Convention Hall
- U.S. National Register of Historic Places
- U.S. Historic district – Contributing property
- Coordinates: 36°9′28.51″N 95°59′42.53″W
- Architect: Curtin
- Part of: Brady Historic District (ID10000618)
- NRHP reference No.: 79002028

Significant dates
- Added to NRHP: August 29, 1979
- Designated CP: September 3, 2010

The Tulsa Theater (formerly known as the Brady Theater, Tulsa Municipal Theater, and Tulsa Convention Hall) is a theater and convention hall located in Tulsa, Oklahoma. It was originally completed in 1914 and remodeled in 1930 and 1952. The building was used as a detention center during the 1921 Tulsa race massacre. It is listed on the National Register of Historic Places and remains in use as a theater today. The theater was previously named after W. Tate Brady but was renamed in 2019 due to Brady's affiliation with the Ku Klux Klan.

== History ==
The theater has served Tulsa as a public assembly facility since its completion in 1914. Located at the corner of W. Reconciliation Way and N. Boulder Avenue, it was built between 1912 and 1914 by The City of Tulsa upon the approval of a $125,000 bond issue. The theater was originally designed as a municipal auditorium and convention hall by the architectural firm of Rose and Peterson of Kansas City, Kansas. From 1914 to 1952, the building was known as Convention Hall. When the facility officially opened, it was billed as the largest hall between Kansas City and Houston, Texas. Another source claims it was one of only 16 theaters in the U. S. equipped to host a full Metropolitan Opera production. Indeed, the theater was frequently host to traveling opera productions, including a performance of Georges Bizet's Carmen starring Mary Garden in the title role in October 1916 with the Ellis Grand Opera. She returned the theater in 1918 with the Chicago Grand Opera Company (CGOC) to perform the title heroine in Jules Massenet's Thaïs. The CGOC also concurrently presented Giuseppe Verdi's La traviata with Frieda Hempel as Violetta. Other opera highlights at the theater included Giacomo Puccini's Madama Butterfly starring Tamaki Miura in 1923; Feodor Chaliapin as Boito's Mefistofele in 1924, and Rosa Raisa as Verdi's Aida in 1927. According to a local legend, the building is haunted by the ghost of Enrico Caruso, who performed there in 1920 and reportedly caught the cold that led to his death of pleurisy in 1921.

Because of its size and proximity to Greenwood the building was used temporarily to detain black men rounded up by the National Guard during the 1921 Race Massacre.

The venue has been given several nicknames by locals, including "The Miracle on Brady Street," "Old Lady on Brady" and the "Theater That Wouldn't Die."

== Description ==
Located at 105 West Reconciliation Way, the building is four stories tall, occupying an area of 130 feet by 160 feet. It was designed with a seating capacity for 4,200 people (including 1,300 in the balcony). The stage was 70 feet wide and 40 feet deep, and slopes 13 feet from back to front. According to the Tulsa Preservation Commission, the building also contained the only municipally owned pipe organ west of the Allegheny Mountains.

=== 2020 renovation ===
The business began calling itself the Tulsa Theater on social media on Tuesday, January 7, 2020. Owner Peter Mayo plans to reuse a stainless-steel sign that spells out the word 'Tulsa' in stylish script, fitted with LED lighting. In storage for four decades, the sign was on the building from 1952 to 1979 while the venue was called the Tulsa Municipal Theater.

=== 1952 additions ===
In 1952, additions were constructed at the front and rear of the original structure. Upper and lower lobbies were added and the building was renamed Tulsa Municipal Theater. The architectural design at the time was referred to as Western Classic Revival. In 1978, The City of Tulsa sold the building by sealed bid to local entrepreneur, Peter Mayo, who has owned it since. In 1979, the building was listed on the National Register of Historic Places. The building was supplanted in 1977 as the city's municipal auditorium by construction of the more modern Tulsa Performing Arts Center a few blocks southeast of the Brady's location. Renamed simply The Tulsa Theater, and affectionately known as "The Old Lady on Brady," it continues to operate as a venue for a wide variety of concerts and theatrical productions.

=== 1930 renovation ===
In 1930, world-renowned architect Bruce Goff was hired as designer of a major overhaul of the interior. He was given thirty days to plan the transformation of the barn-like space into an elegant showplace suitable for a city that was becoming known as the "Oil Capital of the World." The Art Deco style remodeling included draperies and seats, vertical wall panels of white plaster decorated with thin gold dividers, gilded air conditioning grilles, and acoustic ceiling tiles painted green, blue, white, and gold. Five massive green and white pendant light fixtures were installed centrally in the auditorium.

== NRHP listing ==
Brady Theater was listed in the National Register of Historic Places listings in Tulsa County, Oklahoma on August 29, 1979. It was listed under National Register Criterion A and its NRIS number is 79002028. It was listed again on the National Register in 2010, as a contributing building in the Brady Historic District.
