= History of Tulsa, Oklahoma =

Tulsa is the second-largest city in the state of Oklahoma and 45th-most populous city in the United States.

Tulsa was settled between 1828 and 1836 by the Lochapoka Band of Creek Native American tribe. For most of the 20th century, the city held the nickname "Oil Capital of the World" and played a major role as one of the most important hubs for the American oil industry.

== Indian Territory: 1830–1882 ==
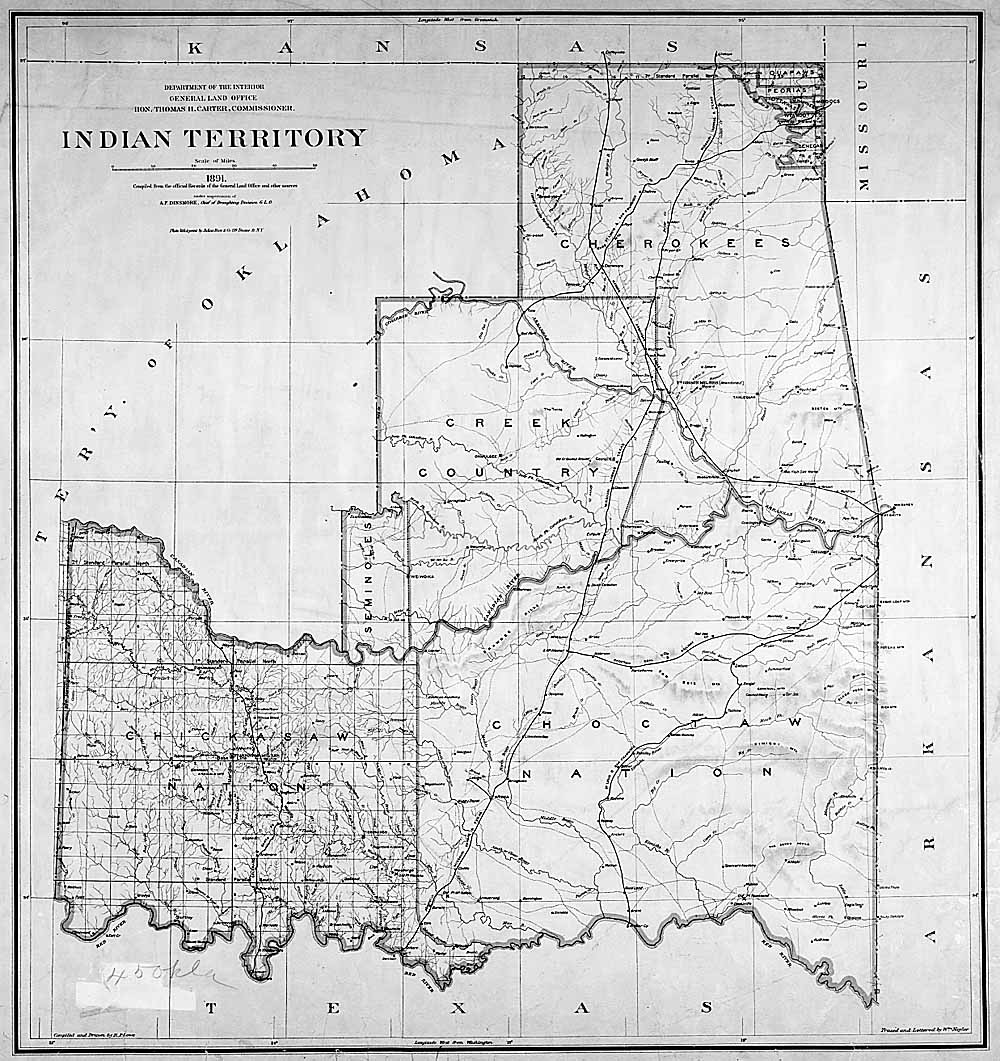
Indian Territory, Eastern part of present-day Oklahoma.

What was to ultimately become Tulsa was part of Indian Territory, which was created as part of the relocation of the Five Civilized Tribes—the Choctaw, Cherokee, Muscogee (Creek), Chickasaw, and Seminole peoples. These Native American tribes moved into the region after the passage of the Indian Removal Act of 1830, when they were forced to surrender their lands east of the Mississippi River to the federal government in exchange for the promise of land and independence in Indian Territory. Each of the larger tribes received reservation land holdings, individual governments were formed, and tribal citizens worked to rebuild their institutions, often as farmers, trappers, and ranchers. The majority of the American Indians (including the numerous Muscogee and Cherokee settlers) were removed from the Southern states. During the Civil War, some citizens favored the Confederacy for financial, social and political reasons. Most of modern Tulsa is located in the Muscogee Nation, with parts located in the Cherokee Nation and Osage Nation.

=== Settlement by Muscogee Creeks ===
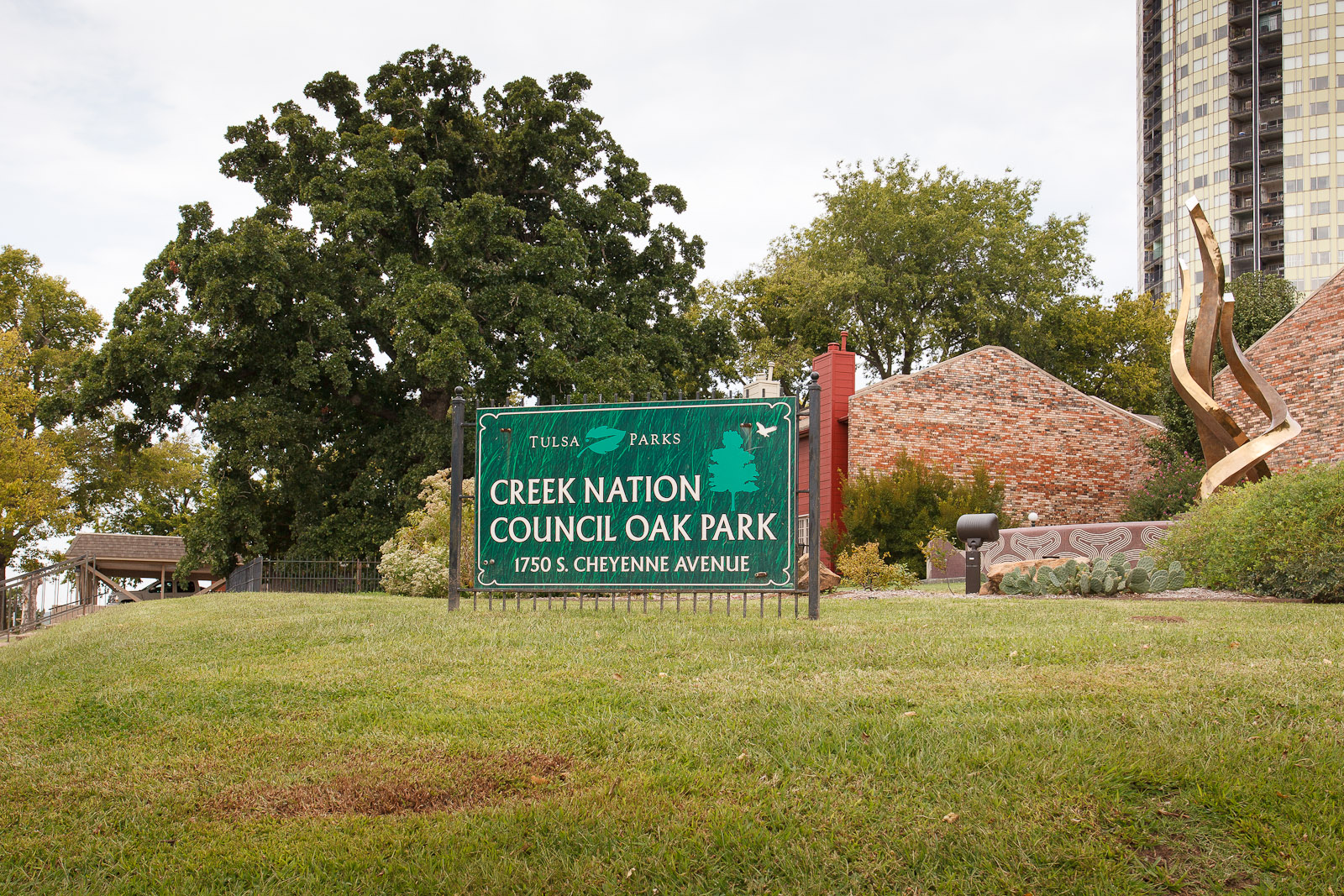
The Creek Council Oak Tree in 2012.

The city now known as Tulsa was first settled by the Lochapoka (Turtle Clan) Muscogee (Creek) between 1828 and 1836. Driven from their native Alabama, and led by their chief, Achee Yahola, the Lochapokas established a new home at a site near present-day Cheyenne Avenue and 18th Street. Under a large Quercus macrocarpa (burr oak) tree, now called the Creek Council Oak Tree, they rekindled their ceremonial fire. (Note: Achee Yahola built the first cabin for his family near the present intersection of First Street and Frisco Avenue.) The Lochapoka named their new settlement "Tulasi," meaning "old town" in their native language. Not coincidentally, 'tulasi' is the same word from which Tallahassee, Florida takes its name. Florida is part of the original home of the Muscogee people. The Lochapoka continued to use the site as late as 1896 for ceremonies, feasts and games. The area surrounding the tree was named the "Creek Nation Council Oak Park" in 1929.

An 1832 visit to the area by the famous American writer Washington Irving is described in his book A Tour on the Prairies (1835). Irving accompanied a U.S. Army exploration party on an excursion from Fort Gibson west onto the prairie and the lands occupied by the Osage and Pawnee tribes. In it, he relates camping in a grove of large trees on the banks of the Arkansas River a few miles south of the present day Tulsa city-limits (now in the suburb of Bixby). Washington Irving Park sits near the location.

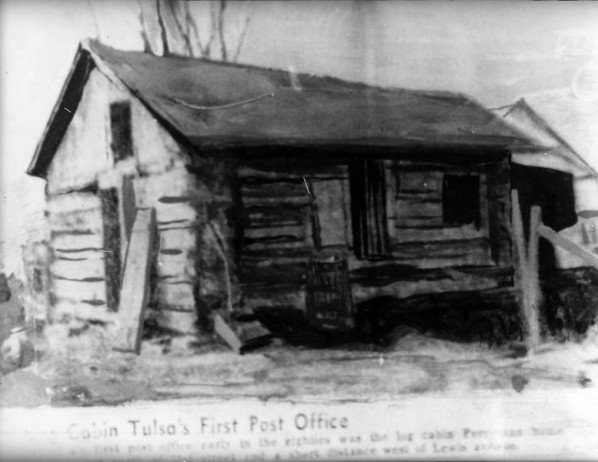
First Tulsa post office (1879), located on Perryman ranch

In 1846, Lewis Perryman built a log cabin trading post near what is now 33rd Street and South Rockford Avenue. Perryman, who was part Creek, established a business foothold in the rugged frontier until the Civil War. The reconstruction period after the war contributed to the growth of the area; in 1879 the first post office opened on a ranch belonging to one of Lewis' sons, Josiah Chouteau Perryman, southeast of town. Josiah was appointed Tulsa's first postmaster. This was located in a log cabin near what would later become 31st Street and Lewis Avenue. Soon, it was officially moved to the George Perryman ranch house. By this time the area was known as 'Tulsey Town' and had grown to be a trading post and cattle town. According to Oklahoma historian, Angie Debo, Lewis Perryman had multiple wives and many children, including at least five sons: Legus C., Sanford W., Thomas W., George and Josiah C., all of whom became prominent in Tulsa's early history.

Debo wrote that the first Christian missionary to reach the Lochapoka area was J. Ross Ramsey, a Presbyterian from the Coweta station farther down the Arkansas River toward the Three Forks (Oklahoma) area. Ramsey stayed at Lewis Perryman's home in 1856, where he preached. His interpreter was Lewis' stepson, David Winslett, then a student at Tullahassee.

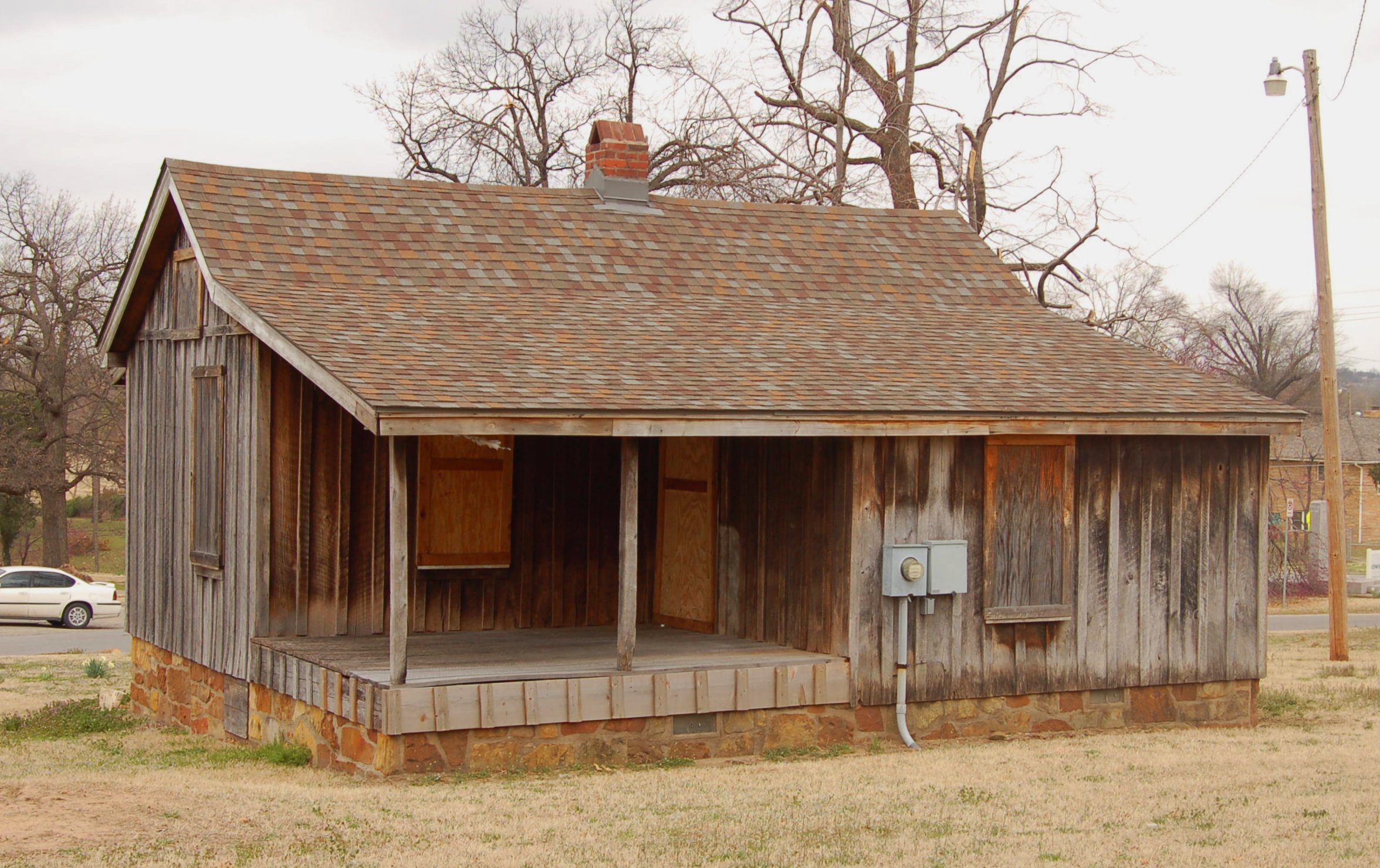
Sylvester Morris House in Owen Park, Tulsa, March 2007. Oldest surviving house in Tulsa.

A Methodist minister, Rev. Sylvester Morris, built a house in the early 1880s that now stands in Tulsa's Owen Park. Originally, it stood on what became North Cheyenne Street. Morris served from 1836 until 1907, according to a sign in front of the house. This is the oldest surviving house in Tulsa.

=== Civil War era ===
The Federal Government split between the anti-slavery Unionists and the pro-slavery secessionists, law and order began to collapse into anarchy in the Indian Territory. Groups of Southerners worked to win the active support of the various tribes who lived there. (Note: The five sons of Lewis Perryman decided to enlist in Company H of the First Creek Mounted Volunteer Regiment. As the Confederate Army scored several early successes, even to threatening Washington D. C., the Union Army soon made the strategic decision to abandon its forts and other Federal strong points (e.g., Indian agencies) and move its forces to other areas.)

After the Creeks formally accepted a treaty with the Confederate States of America (CSA), principal chief Opothle Yahola realized that those who had voted against the treaty (mostly full-bloods) were in danger of being assassinated. These Creeks, gathered their wives, children, movable possessions and livestock and moved to a temporary camp between the North Fork and Deep Fork of the North Canadian River, along with some Seminoles and Union supporters of other tribes. Upon learning that a force composed of Texas Cavalry and Confederate-supporting Indians was enroute to capture them, they commenced an orderly flight to find safety at a Federal fort in Kansas. (Note: The Confederate force was commanded by Colonel Douglas H. Cooper.) The pursuing Confederates caught up with Opothleyahola's band at a place later named Round Mountain on November 19, 1860. Although the Texans attacked at nightfall, it soon became too dark to distinguish friend from foe, and both sides disengaged. During the night, the Unionists broke camp and slipped away. (Note: This skirmish, called the Battle of Round Mountain, is considered the first military engagement of the Civil War in Indian Territory)

Opothleyahola led his band toward Tulsey Town, where the Lochapokas supplied provisions and decided to join the retreating band's trek. Cooper camped for awhile, expecting orders to rejoin the Confederate army in Arkansas. Those orders did not arrive, so he resumed chasing Opothleyahola on November 29. By then, the Unionists had crossed from Creek territory into Cherokee territory, where a regiment of Cherokee full-bloods welcomed them. On December 8, most of the Cherokee soldiers decide to join the Unionists, put on cornshuck badges, and deserted the Confederate cause, leaving their Confederate commander, John Drew, as a leader without an army. On December 9, as Cooper and his troops advanced toward Tulsey Town along Bird Creek, the Unionists ambushed both ends of his column. By the end of the day, the Confederates had pushed the Unionists across the creek. While Cooper's troops camped on the prairie that night, the Unionists slipped away again. The next day, Cooper reported that his casualties were 15 men killed and 37 wounded. He saw the defection of so many Cherokees as a bad omen, and ordered part of his command to march directly to Fort Gibson while he and the rest of his troops camped at Choska.

== Railroads: 1882–1901 ==
In August, 1882, the population of Tulsa was about 200, when the Atlantic and Pacific Railroad, which later merged into the St. Louis and San Francisco Railway (familiarly known as the Frisco), completed the extension of its line to Tulsa from the town of Vinita to serve the cattle business, the city's first industry.

Josiah Perryman and his partner Has Reede opened a mercantile store at First and Main. Perryman moved the post office from his home to this store to provide better mail service to the community. He continued as postmaster until 1885, when he was succeeded by James M. Hall. Josiah died in 1889.

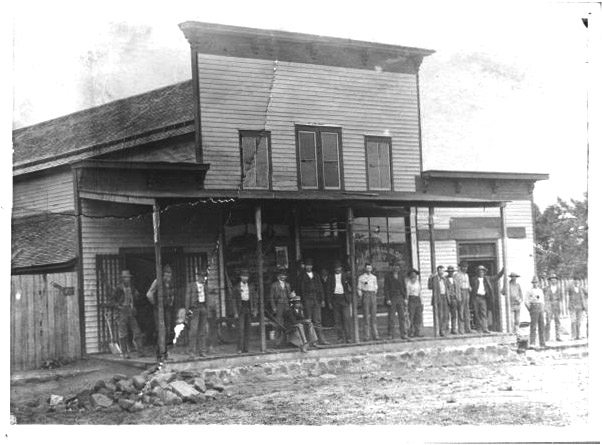
James M. & Harry C. Hall Store on First Street, 1890

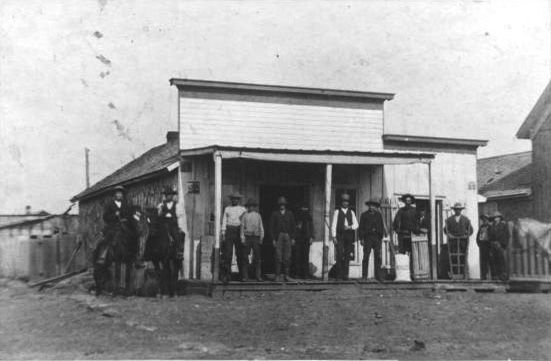
T. J. Archer General Store on First Street, 1893

The Hall brothers, James M. and Harry C., who had operated the railway's company store in Vinita chose the point at which the railroad stopped. They initially selected a site where the railroad crossed what would become Lewis Avenue and pitched a tent for the store there. This location was just inside the boundary of the Cherokee nation. When the Halls discovered that the Creek Nation had fewer restrictions on the activities of white merchants, they moved the store a couple of miles west to what would become First street and erected a more permanent wooden building. James M. Hall, who would later be referred to as the 'Father of Tulsa,' marked off Tulsa's first streets, built its first permanent store, organized its first church, school, and government, and served as Tulsa's first Interim Postmaster.

In March, 1883, T. J. (Jeff Archer), a mixed-blood Cherokee, opened a general store on First street, north of the Frisco railroad track. He soon fell in love with the daughter of George Mowbray. In 1905, he died in a tragic accident at his store, when an inebriated customer's firearm discharged into the area where Archer kept explosives, causing a keg of powder to explode. The store was demolished. The customer died instantly, while Archer suffered for a few weeks before he died. The city memorialized the popular storekeeper by naming the street paralleling the Frisco track for him.

In the summer of 1884, Rev. W. P. Haworth, a Presbyterian missionary serving at Vinita, Oklahoma, was sent to Tulsa to take charge of the church work. He constructed a building on the southeast corner of Fourth Street and Boston Avenue. Meanwhile Mrs. Haworth and another woman began teaching school in their homes until Haworth's building was finished. He opened the first church in the mission on October 5, 1885. Haworth did not remain long in Tulsa because soon after preaching against Tulsa's lawlessness one Sunday in 1888, he was beaten unconscious. Immediately, he resigned his position and moved to California.

The Presbyterian Church (PCUSA) established the Presbyterian Mission Day School, a one-story building at what would become 4th Street and Boston Avenue in 1884. A second story was soon added to accommodate the number of children who were to attend. This school operated until 1889. After W. Tate Brady and many other prominent Tulsa businessmen signed the city charter in 1898, the newly incorporated city government took over the school and made it the first public school. James M. Hall and three other men bought the property with their own funds and held the title until the city could reimburse them.

Throughout the 19th century, the Native American tribes were made to accept a number of treaties that further reduced the size of their lands and introduced new tribes into Indian Territory. White settlers continued to push forward, and in 1892 the land was officially opened and all tribal members were forced to accept individual allocations of land. By 1898, the city had a population of 1,100. The city of Tulsa was incorporated in 1899. The 1900 U. S. census reported a population of 1,390.

The first newspaper in Tulsa, The Tulsa Review, began publication in 1893. Another newspaper, the New Era, was launched in 1895 to appeal to business leaders desiring positive stories about the city. The New Era was later renamed the Indian Republican and the Tulsa World in 1905. Eugene Lorton bought an interest in the Tulsa World in 1911, and it was owned by the Lorton family until 2013.

The first telephone system in Tulsa was begun in 1899 by Robert H. Hall, who linked 80 subscribers. In 1903, he sold his system to the Indian Territory Telephone Company (ITTC), then based in Vinita, Oklahoma. The Pioneer Telephone and Telegraph Company bought ITTC on July 8, 1904, becoming the sole provider of telephone service in Tulsa. (Note: Pioneer merged with several other telephone companies until the system was renamed Southwestern Bell Telephone Company (SWBTC) in 1917. SWBTC became a subsidiary of Southwestern Bell Corporation in 1985, after the breakup of American Telephone and Telegraph (AT&T). It was renamed SBC Communications, Inc. in 1995. Since 2004, it has been named SBC Southwest.)

In 1900, Rev. C. W. Kerr arrived in Tulsa as the first permanent Christian minister. He organized the First Presbyterian Church of Tulsa, and remained as its senior minister until he retired in 1941. He also played a significant role in the growth of Tulsa.

== Oil boom: 1901–1907 ==
Tulsa changed from a small frontier town to a boomtown with the discovery of oil in 1901 at Red Fork, a small community southwest of Tulsa and on the opposite side of the Arkansas River. Wildcatters and investors flooded into the city and the town began to take shape. In 1901, the city contracted with Dan Patton and his brother Gus to perform an official survey and lay out streets. Neighborhoods were established in Tulsa on the opposite side of the Arkansas River from the drilling sites, and began to spread out from downtown Tulsa.

A smallpox epidemic struck Tulsa in 1900. Few homes were large enough to isolate a patient from others in the family, so Dr. Fred S. Clinton, a pioneer surgeon, set up the area's first hospital in a four-room cottage near the intersection of Archer and Greenwood. However, after the epidemic passed in the following year, this hospital closed. Tulsa's next hospital opened in an unfinished large wooden building at Fifth and Lawton in 1906. A nursing school opened at the hospital, and the first class graduated in 1908.

There were a number of natural springs in the vicinity of Tulsa, but it was soon obvious that these would be inadequate to serve a large city. Therefore, Tulsa built a pumping plant in 1904 to deliver water from the Arkansas River to a standpipe atop a hill north of downtown. The hill was henceforth known as Standpipe Hill. Water then flowed by gravity to consumers in town. However, the source soon proved unsatisfactory, and unsuitable for domestic use. The water was high in silt, salt and gypsum. Filtration could remove most of the suspended solids, but not dissolved solids. There was no chemical treatment to further improve the taste or appearance. Wells also proved unsatisfactory because the water was either hard and salty or ran dry after a relatively short time. As a result, most Tulsans purchased potable water in 5-US-gallon (19 L) containers.

In 1905, the Glenn Pool oil field was discovered. This strike created such a large supply of crude oil that it forced Tulsans to develop storage tanks for the excess oil and gas and, later, pipelines. It also laid the foundation for Tulsa to become a leader in many businesses related to oil and gas, in addition to being the physical center of the growing petroleum industry. Eventually, Glenn Pool established Oklahoma as one of the leading petroleum producing regions in the United States. Many early oil companies such as Texaco chose Tulsa for their home base.

Tulsa built its first two public schools in 1905. Construction of more schools began accelerating in 1906. In December 1907, control of the public schools passed from the city government to the Tulsa Board of Education. Tulsa High School' opened in 1906 on the same block formerly occupied by the Presbyterian mission school, which had been razed. The new school was a three-story cream colored brick building with a dome. The school was accredited by the North Central Association of Schools and Colleges in 1913.

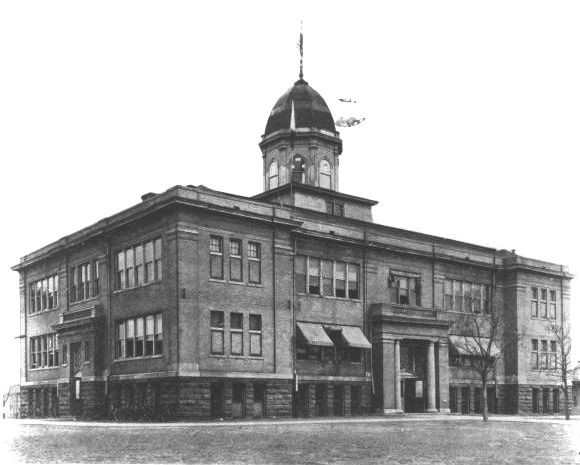
Tulsa High School - first high school, built in 1905 and replaced by Central High School in 1917.

== Statehood: 1907–1915 ==
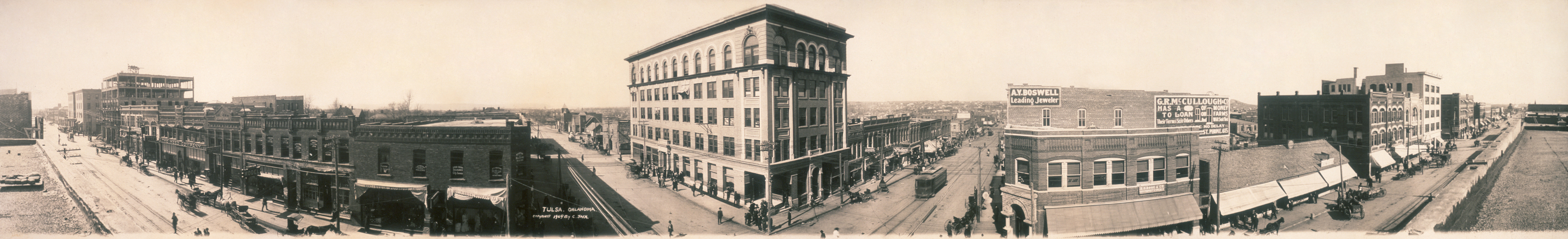
A 1909 panoramic view of Tulsa

Kendall College, a Presbyterian school, moved to Tulsa from Muskogee in 1907. This school, the forerunner of the University of Tulsa, became the start of higher education in Tulsa.

By the time Oklahoma achieved statehood in 1907, Tulsa had a population of 7,298.

According to the 1910 U. S. census, the population of Tulsa had increased to 18,182.

The first petroleum refinery in Tulsa, built by Texaco, went onstream in 1910 in West Tulsa, across the Arkansas River from Tulsa. Texaco continued to operate the plant until 1983, when the facility was sold to Sinclair Oil Company. At the time the refinery was sold to Sinclair, the refinery capacity was rated at 50,000 barrels (7,900 m^{3}) per day.

The second refinery was built in West Tulsa two miles (3 km) upstream on the Arkansas River in 1913 by Joshua Cosden, who also founded the Cosden Petroleum Company. The refinery later operated as the Sunray D-X and Sunoco brands. Holly Corporation of Dallas, Texas bought both the former Texaco and Sunoco refineries in 2009 and announced that it would operate both as a single refinery.

Downtown Tulsa, looking east on 2nd Street from Main Street, 1908.

High rise buildings began to appear downtown during this decade. The Tulsa Hotel and the Brady Hotel annex were both constructed around 1910. The 16-story Cosden Building was constructed in 1918, and is considered the first skyscraper in Tulsa. It was later acquired by Mid Continent Oil Company, who built an adjacent tower integrated with the older structure. This is now called the Mid-Continent Tower.

1917 saw the construction of the Federal Building that contained both the main post office and courtrooms of United States District Court for the Eastern District of Oklahoma. The building was substantially expanded in 1933, covering the west side of Boulder Avenue between Second and Third Streets.

== Second oil boom: 1915–1930 ==
By 1920 the population boomed to over 72,000. Many of these new residents came from Pennsylvania, Ohio, and New York. The second surge of oil discoveries occurred between 1915 and 1930, and firmly established Tulsa as the "Oil Capital of the World". Wealthy oilmen such as Waite Phillips, William G. Skelly and J. Paul Getty built stately mansions and beautiful modern headquarters. The prevalence of the Art Deco style of architecture during this period resulted in a treasure trove of beautiful structures. Cultural institutions such as a Symphony and professional Ballet and Opera Companies were founded, as well as Theatre Tulsa, the oldest surviving community theatre west of the Mississippi River. In 1932, Waite Phillips donated his exquisite Italianate mansion "Philbrook" to the city of Tulsa for use as an art museum.

== Roaring twenties: 1920–1930 ==
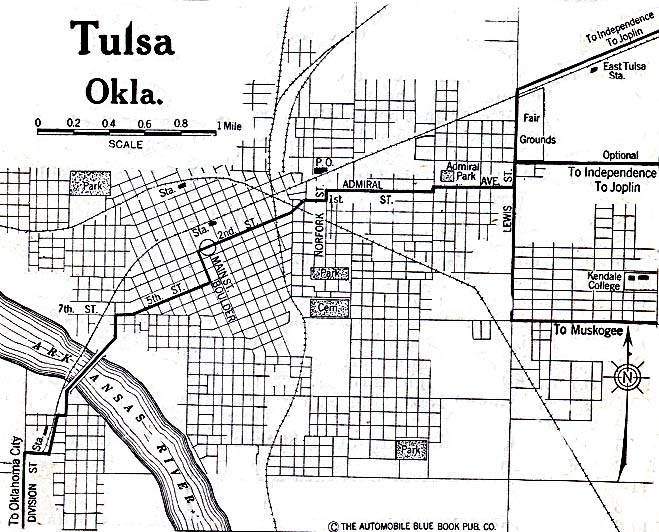
Map of Tulsa in 1920

Another community that flourished in Tulsa during the early oil booms was Greenwood. It was the largest and wealthiest of Oklahoma's African American communities and was known nationally as "Black Wall Street". The neighborhood was a hotbed of jazz and blues in the 1920s. The scene in Greenwood was so hot that story has it that in 1927 while on tour, Count Basie heard a dance band in a club in Greenwood and decided to focus on jazz.

=== Race massacre: 1921 ===
The Tulsa Race Massacre of 1921 – also known as the 1921 Race Riot, the Tulsa Race War, or the Greenwood Riot – was one of the nation's worst acts of racial violence and large-scale civil disorder. From May 31 to June 1, 1921 during 16 hours of rioting by whites, more than 39 people were officially reported killed (although unofficial reports state that more than 300 African Americans were murdered, with an unknown number of bodies buried unceremoniously in a mass grave.) Over 800 people were admitted to local hospitals with injuries, an estimated 10,000 were left homeless, 35 city blocks composed of 1,256 residences were destroyed by fire, and $1.8 million (nearly $17 million after adjustment for inflation) in property damage. There are long-standing reports that the local government sought assistance from the state government, at which time, the National Guard was deployed. White assailants utilized private planes to drop munitions on, as well as, shoot at fleeing blacks in the Tulsa Greenwood community. This attack killed upwards of 75 to 300 people and destroyed more than 1,100 homes. Confined mainly to the segregated Greenwood neighborhood of Tulsa, the riot was responsible for wiping out nearly all the prosperity and success that Black Wall Street had achieved to that time, although some of the residential neighborhood was rebuilt within a few years and flourished until the 1960s. However, several blocks of retail and business buildings still stood burnt out, unsafe, and collapsing for more than 60 years. The blocks at the intersection of Greenwood and Archer streets stood as silent proof of the devastation as late as 1982.

=== Spavinaw Water Project ===
Tulsa built a pumping plant in 1904 to deliver water from the Arkansas River to consumers. However, the source soon proved unsatisfactory, and unsuitable for domestic use. The water was high in silt, salt and gypsum. Wells also proved unsatisfactory because the water was either hard and salty or ran dry after a relatively short time. In 1922, Tulsa city voters approved nearly $7 million in bonds to construct the Spavinaw Dam. Spavinaw Dam, near the town of Spavinaw, Oklahoma and about 50 miles (80 km) northeast of Tulsa, was completed in 1924; it was then the third most expensive municipal works project in the U.S. The water project created Lake Spavinaw, which was fed by Spavinaw Creek, a perennial stream that drained 400 square miles (1,000 km^{2}) of Ozark Mountain foothills. In 1922, a pipeline was begun to bring this water to Lake Yahola in Tulsa's Mohawk Park. On June 23, 1923, the Arkansas River flooded the city waterworks. The flood caused the city to relocate the waterworks to Mohawk Park. The line became operational in 1924, and was the longest such line in the U. S. at that time. Five years later, the city completed the Mohawk Water Treating Plant. This has been the principal source of Tulsa's domestic water since then. Tulsa completed a second pipeline in 1954, doubling the capacity. According to the City of Tulsa, the average monthly water pumpage rate in 2009 was 103 million US gallons (390,000 m^{3}) per day. The range during that year was 81.5 million US gallons (309,000 m^{3}) per day in February to 138.2 million US gallons (523,000 m^{3}) per day in July. In 1952, Lake Eucha was created by completion of the Eucha dam, which functions as additional storage and as a buffer for Lake Spavinaw. W. R. Holway is credited with the design and construction of both projects.

=== Annexations during the 1920s ===
Tulsa annexed the community of Red Fork across the Arkansas River in 1927. In 1928, Tulsa annexed the community of Carbondale. Both are now considered neighborhoods in West Tulsa.

== The Great Depression: 1930–1940 ==
In 1930, the population was over 140,000 people, approximately double that of the 1920 census. Some significant events continued from the previous decades. The Tulsa Union Depot, completed in 1931, consolidated all passenger railroad traffic in one location. Passenger service was discontinued in 1967, and the building stood vacant for 14 years. In 1982, it was converted into offices.

The Philcade Building, commissioned by Waite Phillips, was completed in 1931. It was the last high-rise Art Deco office building constructed in the downtown area. For many years, the Philcade was also known as the Stanolind Building or the BP Building. A new terminal building was completed for the Tulsa Municipal Airport in 1932.

The Great Depression arrested population growth in Tulsa. The change in population was insignificant (increasing less than one percent) between the 1930 census and the 1940 census, and the land area increased by only half a square mile. However, the local economy was not devastated in the same degree as much of the rest of the Midwest.

Residents had enough land to grow a garden better during the depression than those who were in apartments in the city. The poorest communities like West Tulsa, Garden City, Red Fork and Carbondale made their backyards into small gardens and small grocers like Warehouse Market, which is still in business at multiple locations, made their mark as thriving Tulsa businesses.

== "America's Most Beautiful City": 1940–1960 ==
Tulsa annexed the town of Dawson on July 7, 1949, adding 3,500 residents and 2.5 square miles (6.5 km^{2}) of area.

For the majority of people, the mid 20th Century proved a time of continuing prosperity. The wealth generated by the early oil industry also helped Tulsa become a leader in the aviation industry. During WWII, the Spartan School of Aeronautics, which belonged to Spartan Aircraft Company was a training site for hundreds of allied pilots. In 1942, Douglas Aircraft built its mile-long Air Force Plant No. 3 to build bombers. Following the war, Tulsa become an important maintenance center for American Airlines and numerous other aviation related businesses developed alongside.

The numerous parks, along with such attractions as its oil mansions, beautiful churches, museums and rose gardens, led to Daniel Longwell calling Tulsa "America's Most Beautiful City" in the June 1957 issue of Reader's Digest for, as Danney Goble described in 1997, "its landscaped airport" and "gaily decorated public buildings" among other architecture. On July 10, 1950, the United States Junior Chamber officially opened its new headquarters in Tulsa. In 1957, a brand new 1957 Plymouth Belvedere, nicknamed Miss Belvedere by the 2007 Oklahoma centennial co-chairperson, was buried underground near the downtown courthouse in an enclosed 6-inch (150 mm) thick concrete tomb to celebrate Oklahoma's semi-centennial. The plaque above the burial stated the car was to be excavated in 2007 to celebrate Oklahoma's centennial. Included in the concrete enclosure was a time capsule with items including an American flag, proclamations from the city government, and more. A contest also took place, under which, the car and 100 dollars in a savings account were to be awarded to the person (or their descendant) who would come the closest in guessing the city's population in 2007. By the time the car was excavated in 2007, the concrete tomb had leaked so that the car's engine had become a pile of rust. The time capsule had remained intact. The contest was won by a Raymond Humbertson (who had never actually lived in the Tulsa area), whose guess of 384,743 came the closest to the actual 382,457. However, he died in 1979, his wife died in 1988 and they had no children, so the car with the savings account (grown to $666.85 since) were instead awarded to his surviving sisters and nephew, who passed it on to a restoration firm. In 2015, it was announced that rust removal work on Miss Belvedere was finished, and she would be displayed at the Historic Auto Attractions Museum in Roscoe, Illinois. During the 1950s, Tulsa annexed 25.80 square miles (66.8 km^{2}), increasing its total area to 49.93 square miles (129.3 km^{2}). One such area was the square mile suburb known as Highland Park, which was annexed in 1956.

== Urban renewal: 1960–1980 ==
Elected in 1958, Mayor James Maxwell led several development projects in the 1960s. Under his administration, voters approved $7.2 million in bonds to build a new civic center, and the International Petroleum Exposition building was constructed on the Tulsa fairgrounds for $3.5 million.

Authorized by a new state law, the Tulsa Urban Renewal Authority (TURA) began operations in 1959. Its first project, the Seminole Hills Project, a public housing facility was begun in 1961 and completed in 1968. TURA was renamed the Tulsa Development Authority (TDA) in 1976. TDA acquires distressed or unwanted properties within designated urban renewal zones in order to encourage new and better development. Members of the TDA Board are appointed by the Mayor, confirmed by the City Council, and supported by city staff employees. As a public trust, TDA can exercise the right of eminent domain.

One of the first major urban renewal projects was the Williams Center. The most notable feature of this project is the BOK Tower (originally named One Williams Center). This required the clearing of several blocks in downtown Tulsa near the Frisco railroad tracks, generally bounded by Detroit on the east to Boulder on the west the railroad tracks on the north and Third Street on the south. Thus, many of the oldest buildings in the city were razed. In all, nine city blocks were cleared of buildings. Notable historic buildings lost included the Daniel Building, Hotel Tulsa, the former Grand Opera House, Lynch Building (then Tulsa's oldest remaining building) and Tulsa's first bank building. The only pre-1910 building remaining in downtown Tulsa is the Pierce Block at Third and Detroit.

== Oil bust and recovery: 1982–present ==
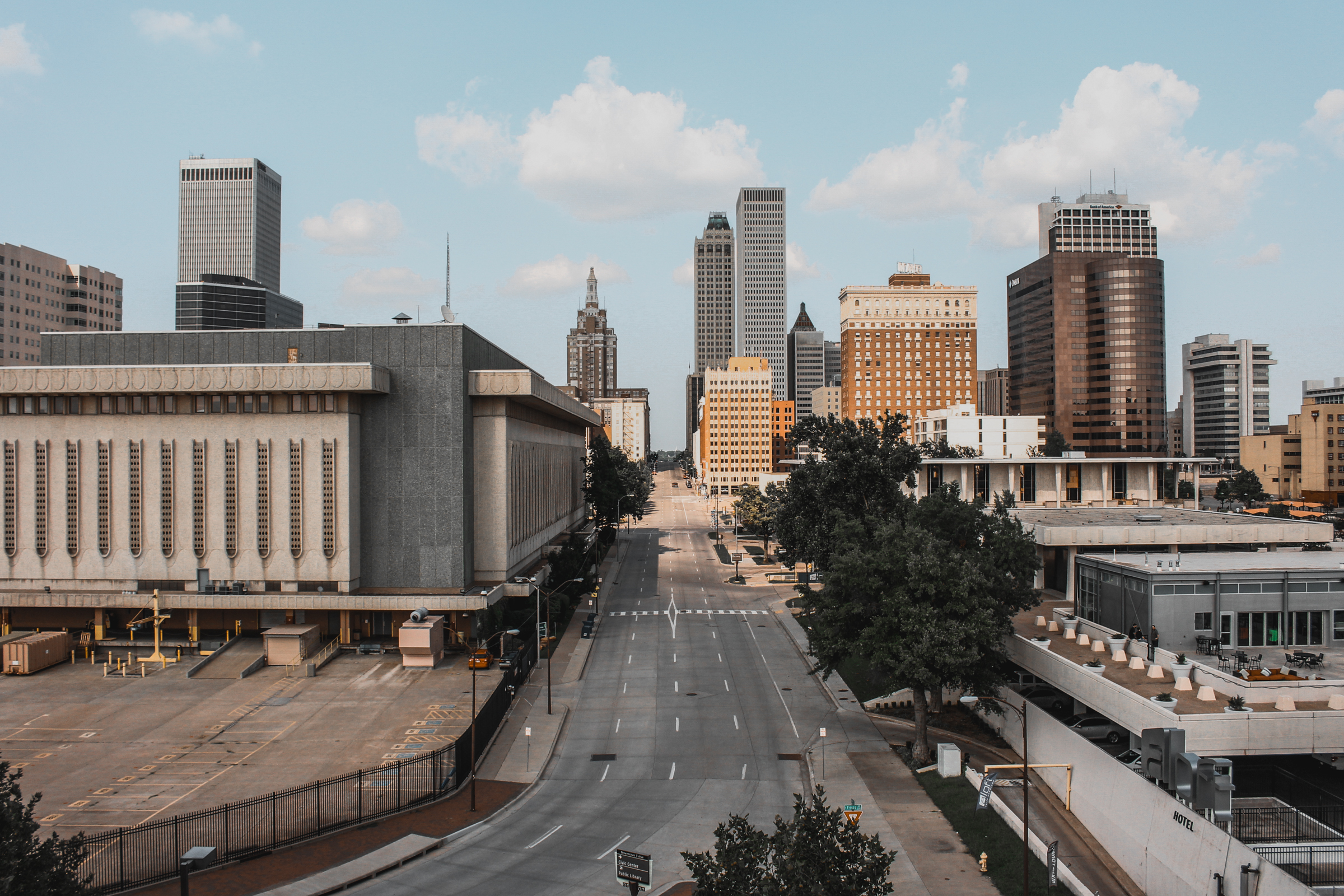
Tulsa's skyline from the Cox Business Center in 2014.

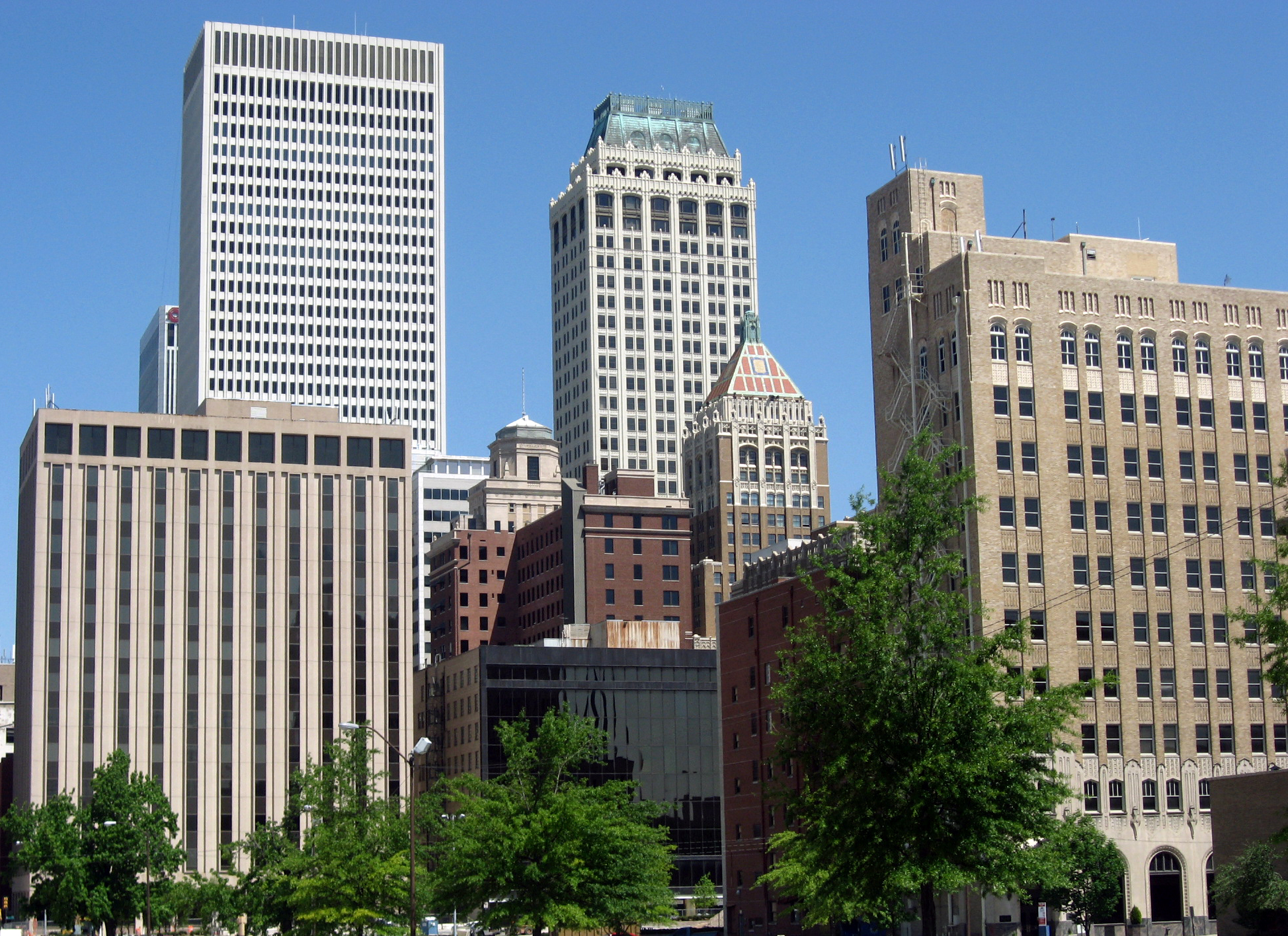
Downtown Tulsa with the Mid-Continent Tower in the middle, behind the Philtower Building.

Following the "Oil Bust" of 1982-84 the title of "Oil Capital of the World" was relinquished to Houston. City leaders worked to diversify the city away from a largely petroleum-based economy, bringing blue collar factory jobs as well as Internet and telecommunications firms to Tulsa during the 1990s, and enhancing the already important aviation industry. During this time, customer-service and reservations call centers became an important part of the local economy. Showing that petroleum is still an important player, an abundant supply of natural gas also helped with recovery.

=== Centennial time capsule ===
In 1998, to celebrate the first century of Tulsa's incorporation as a city, the city sealed a Plymouth Prowler in a time capsule buried in Centennial Park (formerly known as Central Park) at 6th Street and Peoria Avenue. The city plans to open it in 2048. This time, the car was encased in a specially-constructed plastic box, which was then entombed in an above-ground concrete vault. The Rotary Club added various other memorabilia to the contents of the time capsule.

=== 21st-century developments ===
The early 21st century saw Tulsa's economy, along with the national economy, facing another economic down-turn and a loss of jobs. However, recovery was reported beginning as early as 2004 and by 2006 the total number of jobs in Tulsa had increased to levels exceeding those prior to the downturn. Helped by relatively low housing prices, Tulsa continued to be an attractive market for business expansion. The efforts by city leaders led to the passage of the "Vision 2025" program in 2003 with the purpose of enhancing and revitalizing Tulsa's infrastructure. The keystone project of Vision 2025 was the construction of the BOK Center in downtown Tulsa. The multi-purpose arena, designed by famed architect Cesar Pelli, serves as the home for the city's minor league hockey team, as well as a venue for major concerts and conventions. Groundbreaking on the structure occurred in 2005 and the building was completed in 2009.

In June 2007, the City of Tulsa formally agreed to support a plan prepared by the Indian Nations Council of Government (INCOG), an agency of Tulsa County, for River development. The plan is based on the Arkansas River Corridor Master Plan produced by city, county and local officials, and the U.S. Army Corps of Engineers in 2005. The plan calls for additional low-water dams to keep water in the river, enhancements to recreational facilities and river crossings for pedestrians, improved access to the river bank and to nearby retail/entertainment areas, aesthetic improvements to existing structures, the inclusion of additional retail and food vendors within the River Parks, additional multi-use development on the west bank of the river, and an overhaul of trails, lighting and signage.

In 2014, construction began on "A Gathering Place for Tulsa," a major expansion and renovation of the Tulsa River Parks area near 31st Street and Riverside Parkway designed by landscape architect Michael Van Valkenburgh Associates. Phase I consists of 66.5 acres and is scheduled for completion in 2017. The Gathering Place is a project of the George Kaiser Family Foundation. Total cost is estimated at $350 Million, and is funded by private and corporate donations, including $200 Million from the Kaiser Family Foundation.

The Kaiser Family Foundation also funded and operates the Guthrie Green, an urban park and entertainment space in the Tulsa Arts District on the square block between Reconciliation Way & Cameron and Boston Avenue & MLK Blvd. Guthrie Green hosts a variety of events, concerts, movies, and fitness classes, all free and open to the public. Guthrie Green celebrated its opening with a three-day festival beginning September 7, 2012. The Green is situated near the Woody Guthrie Center, a museum and archives focusing on the Oklahoma native and the power of the creative process; the Philbrook Museum's downtown annex, focusing on the museum's modern and Native American art collections; and the University of Tulsa's Henry Zarrow Center for Art & Education, all of which opened in 2013. All three occupy the renovated former Tulsa Paper Co. Building, built in 1922.

The 2017 Tulsa tornado took place on August 5–6, 2017 near Tulsa, Oklahoma.

== See also ==
- Timeline of Tulsa, Oklahoma
- Flooding and flood control in Tulsa
