= Tulsa parks and recreation =

Department of the City of Tulsa

Coordinates: 36°09′19.5″N 95°59′23.5″W

The City of Tulsa manages 135 parks spread over 8,278 acres (3,350 ha). This includes 2 nature centers, 6 community centers with fitness facilities, gymnasiums and meeting rooms, 2 skate parks, 2 dog parks, 4 swimming pools, 66 miles of walking trails, 186 sports fields, 93 playgrounds, 111 tennis courts, 13 water playgrounds, 17 splash pads, 61 picnic shelters, 4 golf courses and 8 disk golf courses. Individual parks range in size from Mohawk Park, the largest at 3,100 acres (1,300 ha) (Note: According to the Trust for Public Land, Mohawk Park ranked as the 36th largest park in the United States) to small neighborhood parks, such as the 10-acre Braden Park in the White City area. The smallest is Creek Nation Council Oak Park at 1.86 acres (0.75 ha).

Lake Eucha Park is the only Tulsa city park not located within Tulsa County. It was created in 1952 as Lake Eucha State Park in Delaware County, Oklahoma, and was one of the state parks that Oklahoma decided to close for financial reasons in 2011. Instead, the City of Tulsa took over the ownership and management of the park. Lake Eucha is near the park and assures a constant supply of high-quality water to Spavinaw Lake, part of the Tulsa water supply system.

Some Tulsa-area park facilities are under the control of the separate RiverParks Authority, such as the Gathering Place, the 300-acre Turkey Mountain Urban Wilderness Area, and the trails along the Arkansas River; and, some are run by Tulsa County Parks, such as the 270-acre LaFortune Park in Midtown Tulsa and the 192-acre Chandler Park.

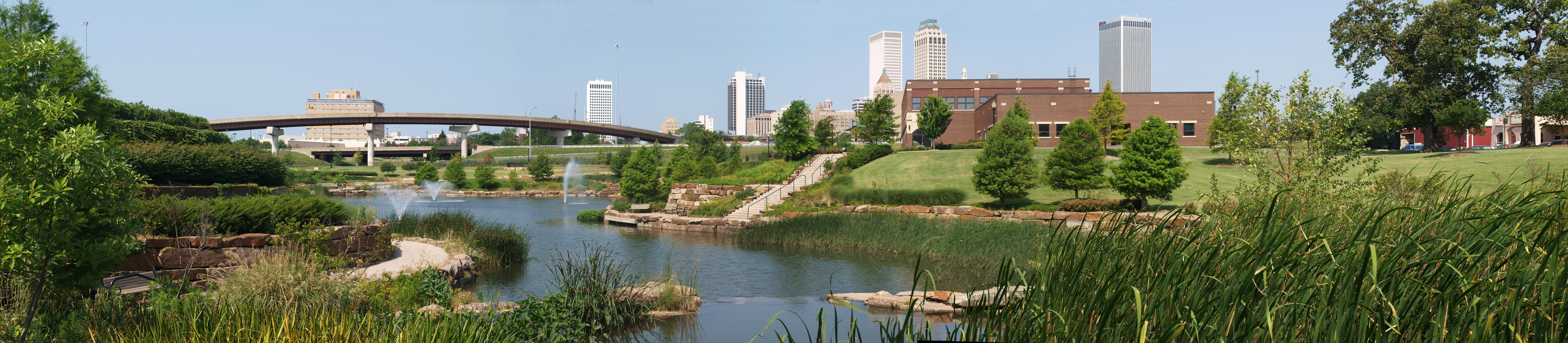
Central Park in Downtown Tulsa June 9, 2011.

== Early parks ==
Owen Park was established on 20 acres (8.1 ha) of land that Tulsa purchased from Chauncey Owen in 1909. The park opened June 8, 1910. The principal attraction for many years was a swimming hole, created in 1913 by damming a ravine in the park. In winter, the water froze and created an ice skating area. Its popularity continued through the 1920s. Swimming and skating are no longer permitted, and the lake has become habitat for birds and geese. John Meisenbacher, Tulsa's first Park Superintendent, later moved into a house located on the park. Park Board meetings were held in a room above his garage.

Orcutt Lake Amusement Park opened to the public in 1908 as a private recreational facility on land that was then outside the city limits. The site had been part of a cattle ranch operated by Colonel Adolphus Orcutt, who had created a cattle watering pond from a natural spring. His son, Gus, married a Creek woman, Annie B. Hodge in 1890. When the Creek lands were allotted Annie and Gus Orcutts became the owners of 800 acres (320 ha) around the stock pond. This is now Swan Lake.

Woodward Park and Gardens is a specialized park that features horticultural exhibits. Tulsa purchased 45 acres (18 ha) of land outside the city limits in 1909 for $100 an acre from Herbert Woodward, intending to use the land as a park. A lengthy lawsuit ensued because the land actually was part of a Creek headright belonging to Herbert's daughter, Helen, then a minor. Her mother was a Creek woman. Herbert had not obtained Helen's permission to sell the land. The suit was decided in Tulsa's favor in 1929, and park construction began only in 1933. Today, Woodward Park and Gardens is known for its floral beauty and is listed on the National Register of Historic Places.

Mohawk Park, created in 1924, is Tulsa's largest park and one of the largest municipal parks in the United States. Located in North Tulsa, it covers 2,800 acres (1,100 ha), and includes hiking trails, picnic grounds and rest rooms. Much of the original development was done by the Civilian Conservation Corps (CCC) and Works Progress Administration (WPA). Among its features are the Tulsa Zoo, Oxley Nature Center, Lake Yahola and the Mohawk Park Golf Course. A soccer field was added in 2013. The original golf course opened in 1934, and has been expanded to 36 holes.

Newblock Park was created in 1927 on land formerly occupied by the first Tulsa waterworks. After the waterworks was damaged beyond repair by an Arkansas River flood. A new water treatment plant was built in the early 1920s, concurrently with the Spavinaw Water Project. A park was built on the vacated property, which covered 84.6 acres (34.2 ha) on Charles Page Blvd.

== Recent additions ==
John Hope Franklin Reconciliation Park is located at 415 North Detroit Avenue, in the Greenwood District of Tulsa. Owned by the City of Tulsa and managed by the John Hope Franklin Center for Reconciliation, it commemorates the Tulsa race massacre of 1921. Dedicated October 10, 2010, it is named for John Hope Franklin who was a noted historian, born in Tulsa. The park includes several sculptures, the most striking of which is a 25 foot (7.6 m) tall sculpture called the Tower of Reconciliation.

The Tower of Reconciliation shows the history of African American struggles as they came from Africa to America, then came with Native Americans on the Trail of Tears; fighting in the American Civil War and living under segregation after Oklahoma statehood. The tower is encircled by twelve bronze plaques that detail the story of the riot and its aftermath.

Hope Plaza, at the park entrance, contains a 16 foot (4.9 m) tall structure that has three bronze sculptures:

- Hostility - a fully armed white man
- Humility - a black man with hands raised in surrender;
- Hope - the white Red Cross director holding a black baby.

Both artistic pieces were sculpted by Ed Dwight, a former Air Force officer and astronaut, who is now a professional sculptor in Denver, CO.

Groundbreaking for the park was held in 2008. John Hope Franklin attended the event, the last public appearance before his death in 2009. His son, John W. Franklin attended the 2010 dedication ceremony.

Guthrie Green, located at Boston Avenue and Brady Street in the Brady Arts District in Downtown Tulsa, opened September 7, 2012. Largely funded by the George Kaiser Family Foundation, it contains an outdoor theater, fountains and a sidewalk cafe.

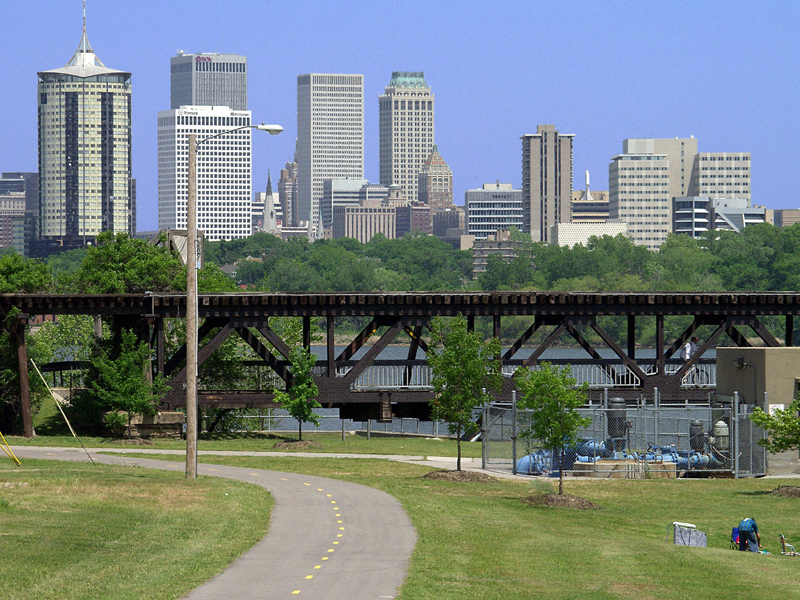
River Parks Trail with Tulsa Skyline in the background. April 5, 2007.

Gathering Place, previously called The Gathering Place and A Gathering Place for Tulsa, was given in August, 2014 to the River Parks Authority by the George Kaiser Family Foundation along with other private donors. Phase 1 of the 3-phased project, which covers 58.37 acres (23.62 ha) was completed in 2018. This phase includes land running from 27th Street to 31st Street on the east side of Riverside Drive and from 26th Street to 33rd Place along the west side. It also includes the Blair Mansion property, a strip of land along the Midland Valley Trail, and a parking lot at 31st Street and Riverside Drive. (Note: The B. B. Blair mansion was a notable home that was demolished in 2010 for the proposed park.) The main attractions are the Chapman Adventure Playground, the Williams Lodge, a boathouse, splash playground, great lawn, outdoor sports courts, a skate park, a wetland pond and garden, and numerous trails among other locations. All three phases will cost $350 million and will eventually cover about 100 acres (40 ha). Tulsa’s Gathering Place was named the Best New Attraction in the nation in 2018 through the USA Today Readers’ Choice awards. In 2019, Gathering Place made Time Magazine's list of The World's 100 Greatest Places of 2019, National Geographic's list of 12 Mind-Bending Playgrounds Around the World, and the American Planning Association's list of six great public spaces in America.

Grace K. Cousins Park, is being constructed by the city and county at 121st Street and Yale Avenue. In 2008, the Cousins family donated 10 acres (4.0 ha) of land to the Tulsa Parks Department, stipulating that the land be used solely for preservation purposes and that the family be involved in its design. The city bought an adjoining 35 acres (14 ha) a few years later and included it in the proposed park, which was named in memory of the deceased family matriarch. The purchase extended the proposed park to the Arkansas River. Construction was put on hold pending a decision about building a proposed toll bridge across the river in the Bixby area. (Note: A bond issue that would have funded the bridge construction was rejected by the voters, killing that project) Planners proposed to build the park in three phases. Phase 1, consisting of a gateway plaza, parking lot, and preliminary design of the rest of the park, began in 2013.

== Dog parks ==
Off-leash dog parks are:

- Bark Park West 78th St South
- Joe Station Dog Park 2279 Charles Page Blvd. (located at Newblock Park)
- Biscuit Acres 5804 East 91 Street

== See also ==
- Park
- Neighborhood parks
- Newblock Park
- Gathering Place (Tulsa park)
