= Spavinaw State Park =

State park in Oklahoma, United States

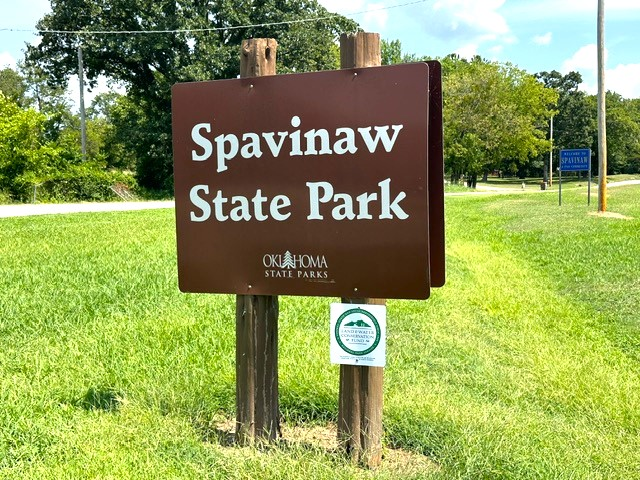
- Sign at Spavinaw State Park, August 2026

- Location within Oklahoma
- Location: Mayes County, Oklahoma, United States
- Nearest city: Spavinaw, Oklahoma
- Coordinates: 36.6270725°N 94.9023851°W
- Area: 35 acres (14 ha)
- Governing body: Oklahoma Tourism and Recreation Department
- Website: www.travelok.com/state-parks/spavinaw-area-at-grand-lake-state-park

Spavinaw State Park, also known as the Spavinaw Area at Grand Lake State Park, is located in Mayes County, Oklahoma, below the spillway on the western end of Lake Spavinaw, along Spavinaw Creek. The park comprises 35 acres. It includes RV and tent camping sites, picnic areas, and toilet facilities. Both tent and RV camping sites are available.

== History ==
Spavinaw Creek was dammed in 1924 as part of the Spavinaw Water Project to create a City of Tulsa municipal water supply in the form of Lake Spavinaw. The park was constructed in the early 1930’s to 1938 timeframe by the Civilian Conservation Corps as an accompanying public recreation facility. The Tulsa connection is why fishing in the park requires a special Tulsa fishing license, rather than a standard state of Oklahoma license.

== Spavinaw WMA ==
Nearby is the Spavinaw Wildlife Management Area, a 14,316-acre Oklahoma Department of Wildlife Conservation facility which provides wildlife viewing and-- on the Game Management Area portion-- certain hunting opportunities.
