= Spavinaw Creek =

- Etymology: Corruption of French cepee vineux

Location
- Country: United States
- States: Arkansas, Oklahoma

Physical characteristics
- Source
  - coordinates: 34°46′56″N 96°37′30″W
  - elevation: 300 m (980 ft)
- Mouth: Neosho River at Lake Hudson (N36.37676° W95.11885°)
- Discharge
  - location: Eucha
  - average: 307 cu ft/s (8.7 m^{3}/s)

Basin features
- River system: Grand River (Oklahoma)
- GNIS ID 1098344

Spavinaw Creek is a stream that begins in Arkansas and flows west into Oklahoma. The mouth is at located at Lake Hudson. The creek drains 400 square miles of the Ozark Mountain foothills and farm land. Two lakes, Lake Spavinaw and Lake Eucha, were impounded to create water supplies for the city of Tulsa approximately 55 miles away.

== Description ==
The actual source begins as a drainage basin and a mostly dry to intermittent brook in northwest Arkansas, flowing west into Oklahoma, picking up intermittent drainage, run-off, and tributaries such as Brush Creek, Dry Creek, Columbia Hollow Creek, Rattlesnake Creek, Cloud Creek, Cherokee Creek, Hog Eye Creek, Spring Branch, and Wolf Creek, that is the Decatur waste discharge point, and others. The creek drains 400 square miles of Ozark Mountain foothills and is a tributary of Grand River.

== Dams ==
The first dam was built in 1923 creating Lake Spavinaw as part of the Spavinaw Water Project. Much of the town of Spavinaw had to be relocated to higher ground. The purpose of the lake was to supply water to the city of Tulsa. The creek was dammed a second time in 1952, creating Lake Eucha as an expanded storage for the Spavinaw system.

== Spavinaw State Park ==
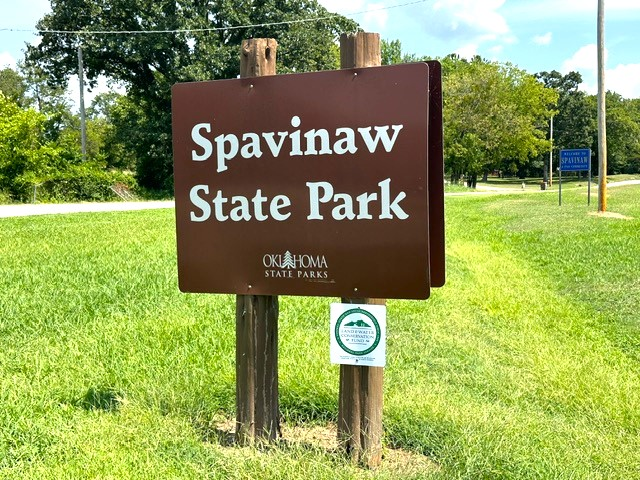
Sign at Spavinaw State Park, August 2026

As part of the overall project, Spavinaw State Park, also known as the Spavinaw Area of Grand Lake State Park, was constructed in the early 1930’s to 1938 timeframe by the Civilian Conservation Corps as an accompanying public recreation facility. The park is located below the spillway on the western end of the lake, along Spavinaw Creek, just outside the town of Spavinaw. The Spavinaw Wildlife Management Area was also created nearby, being a 14,316-acre Oklahoma Department of Wildlife Conservation facility which provides wildlife viewing and-- on the Game Management Area portion-- certain hunting opportunities.

== Water quality ==
The land usage was shown in a 2002 study to be predominantly livestock and poultry with a small percentage of row crops. There were 54,172 head of cattle and calves, 128,066,609 Broilers & chickens, and the number of Hogs & pigs was not determined in Delaware County, OK. There were 40,251 head cattle and calves, 37,154,935 Broilers & chickens, and 285,661 in Benton County, AR. The result of water quality testing showed a high concentration of phosphorus resulting in algae growth. A major tributary to Lake Eucha, Beaty Creek, was found (2004 study) to be impaired by pathogens, specifically Enterococcus. There can be many causes of contamination such as faulty septic systems, wildlife and livestock grazing fecal bacteria, unstable stream banks, municipal and industrial storm water and waste water discharge, commercial fertilizer, pet waste, soil erosion, and "confined/concentrated animal feeding operations" (CAFOs) such as the many poultry farms. The Decatur, Arkansas waste water treatment plant also includes waste from a poultry processing plant. Large poultry operations are considered point sources whereas smaller operations are not but cumulatively contribute to the phosphorus loading in the watershed. The city of Tulsa brought court proceedings that resulted in a ruling for a reduction in discharge of phosphorus from the city of Decatur and poultry producers in the watershed to improve water quality as well as reduce treatment costs. Both Lake Spavinaw and Lake Eucha have been designated as “sensitive public and private water supply” (SWS) and “nutrient limited watershed” (NLW). Any increase in discharge must receive prior approval. 72 poultry producers in Oklahoma and 22 in Arkansas are cooperating in the best management practices (BMP) to reduce nutrients in the watershed.
