= Oklahoma Mesonet =

Weather observation network in Oklahoma

- Approved: 1990
- Funded: 1991
- Commissioned: January 1, 1994; 32 years ago
- Headquarters: National Weather Center in Norman, Oklahoma
- Partners: University of Oklahoma, Oklahoma State University
- Website: http://mesonet.org

The Oklahoma Mesonet is a network of environmental monitoring stations designed to measure the environment at the size and duration of mesoscale weather events. The phrase "mesonet" is a portmanteau of the words mesoscale and network.

The network consists of 120 automated stations covering Oklahoma and each of Oklahoma's counties has at least one station. At each site, the environment is measured by a set of instruments located on or near a 10-meter (33 ft)-tall tower. The measurements are packaged into “observations” and transmitted to a central facility every 5 minutes, 24 hours per day, every day of the year.

Oklahoma Mesonet is a cooperative venture between Oklahoma State University (OSU) and the University of Oklahoma (OU) and is supported by the taxpayers of Oklahoma. It is headquartered at the National Weather Center (NWC) on the OU campus.

Observations are available free of charge to the public.

== Background ==
According to the Tulsa World, creation of the Oklahoma Mesonet resulted from the inability of emergency management officials to plan for the May 26–27, 1984 flood that killed 14 people in the Tulsa area. The 1984 flood demonstrated that emergency managers could not receive accurate and adequate data quickly enough about the progress of flooding from airport radars, updated hourly. The University of Oklahoma and Oklahoma State University collaborated with the Climatological Survey and other public and private agencies to create the Oklahoma Mesonet. This system collects weather information (e.g., wind speed, rainfall, temperature) every 5 minutes from 121 Mesonet stations throughout Oklahoma. Emergency planners can now monitor up-to-date weather information in advance of the arrival of an approaching storm. The article quoted an official of the Tulsa Area Emergency Management as saying that his staff uses the Oklahoma Mesonet every day.

== Products ==
The Oklahoma Mesonet produces multiple weather products for public consumption and download: these include maps of all of the meteorological variables updated every five minutes to show the latest observations and time series plots of a station (called meteograms) over a given period of time. Historical data can be plotted using the Oklahoma Mesonet's Long Term Average tools.

== See also ==
- Flooding and flood control in Tulsa
