= Lake Yahola (Oklahoma) =

Lake Yahola Dam
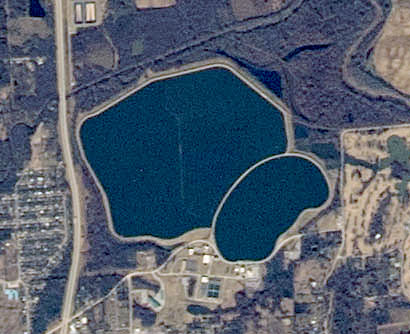
- Lake Yahola seen from the ISS

- Location within Oklahoma
- Country: United States
- Location: Tulsa, Oklahoma
- Coordinates: 36.2184266°N 95.923605°W
- Status: complete
- Opening date: 1924
- Owner: City of Tulsa

Dam and spillways
- Elevation at crest: 603.52 ft (183.95 m)

Reservoir
- Creates: Lake Yahola
- Total capacity: 2 billion US gallons (7,600,000 m^{3}) nominal
- Surface area: 431 acres (1.74 km^{2})
- Maximum water depth: 18 feet (5.5 m)

Lake Yahola is a reservoir in Tulsa, Oklahoma. The reservoir was completed in 1924. Its primary purpose is to store raw water for treatment and distribution. This city-owned, 2-billion-US-gallon (7,600,000 m^{3}), concrete-lined lake is an integral part of the Tulsa water supply, and receives water by pipeline from Lake Spavinaw. It is located in Mohawk Park, adjacent to the Mohawk Water Treatment Plant.

== Lake description ==
The lake covers 437 acres (1,770,000 m^{2}) and has an average depth of 18.5 feet (5.6 m).

The lake is encompassed by 3.2 miles (5.1 km) of shoreline.

The original water treatment plant, designed to process 90 million gallons per day (MGD), went into service in 1929. It was replaced in 1998 by a new plant designed to process 100 MGD. The Mohawk plant has been expanded to a design capacity of 200 MGD

== Recreation ==
Lake Yahola also serves as a recreation site, with facilities for boating and fishing. However, the Oklahoma Department of Wildlife Conservation states that the docks are closed to the public and that boating is not allowed. Fishing from sites along the shore is allowed.

The adjacent Oxley Nature Center is a popular place for bird watching.
