= Dan W. Patton =

American politician and engineer

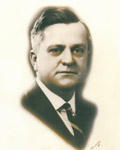

Tulsa City Engineer
- In office 1944–1948

17th Mayor of Tulsa
- In office 1928–1930
- Preceded by: Herman Frederick Newblock
- Succeeded by: George L. Watkins

Tulsa County Engineer
- In office 1917–1926
- In office 1939–1941

Mayor of Poteau
- In office April 6, 1915 – 1917

Personal details
- Born: Daniel Webster Patton; August 1, 1885 Greenwood, Arkansas, U.S.
- Died: December 30, 1963 (aged 78) Tulsa, Oklahoma, U.S.
- Political party: Republican (after 1928); Progressive Party (1914)

Daniel Webster Patton (August 1, 1885 – December 30, 1963) was an American politician who served as the 17th Mayor of Tulsa from 1928 to 1930.

== Biography ==
Daniel Webster Patton was born on August 1, 1885, near Fort Smith, Arkansas, to Rufus Patton and Mary C. McClure. At 15, he joined the U.S. Department of Interior working alongside his older brother J. Gus Patton. The two brothers moved to Tulsa in 1901 and surveyed and plotted the town. Daniel stayed in Tulsa and surveyed railroads and bridges in eastern Oklahoma. He was a candidate for Oklahoma Secretary of State in the Progressive Party's primary in 1914, but he lost primary to P. S. Coleman. He was the county engineer in Le Flore County and Pushmataha County while living in Poteau. He was elected mayor of Poteau on April 6, 1915.

In 1917, Patton returned to Tulsa and served as county engineer until 1926. Patton was a Republican and won the 1928 Tulsa Mayoral election. He lost re-election campaigns for mayor in 1930 and 1932. He returned to the Tulsa County engineers office from 1939 to 1941 and later served as the city engineer for Tulsa from 1944 to 1948. He was fired as Tulsa city engineer by Roy M. Lundy after his mayoral election. He died on December 30, 1963, in Tulsa.
