= Newblock Park =

Park in Oklahoma, United States

Coordinates: 36°09′05″N 96°00′44″W

Newblock Park is part of Tulsa Parks municipal parks system. It is located in northwest Tulsa, Oklahoma at 1710 Charles Page Blvd. It covers 84.6 acres (34.2 ha), and contains a few amenities (picnic tables, etc.), one non-manicured softball field, one manicured softball field (Forche Field), Waterworks Art Studio, and a junior municipal swimming pool (closed). The park, which opened in 1927, was named for Herman Frederick Newblock, who served four terms (1922 – 1928 and 1932 – 1934) as mayor of Tulsa.

The Newblock Park Trail connects the Riverparks trail system to the Katy Trail and is 1.5 miles (2.4 km) long.

== Historical background ==
The site now occupied by the park was originally used for a water filtration plant by the Tulsa Water Department in the early 20th century. Its purpose was to remove silt from Arkansas River water, which was then piped to users in Tulsa. The filtration plant was unable to meet the design requirements and was abandoned in 1918. Tulsa then selected the Spavinaw Water Project to provide water for the city. In 1923, the Arkansas River flooded the original treatment plant. The original 1910 brick building has been converted to the WaterWorks Art Center.

== See also ==
Newblock Park Trail Map

New Block Swimming Pool had double pools (Shallow and Deep/both Olympic Size) At that time, this pool was the largest concrete pool in Oklahoma. It had a 10-foot diving board and a low board, tall life guard towers, and a slanted wood "board walk" for sunbathing. The building had a recreation area, huge entry area, large dressing rooms.
