= Spavinaw, Oklahoma =

- Town
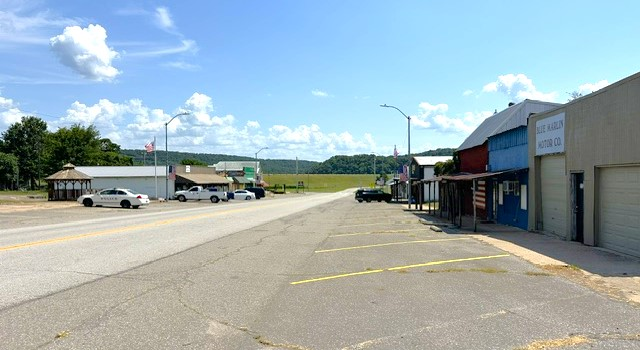
- Downtown Spavinaw in August of 2026

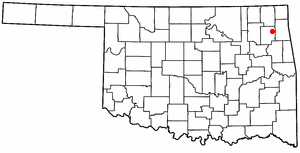
- Location in Oklahoma
- Coordinates: 36°23′38″N 95°03′01″W
- Country: United States
- State: Oklahoma
- County: Mayes

Area
  - Total: 0.41 sq mi (1.07 km^{2})
  - Land: 0.41 sq mi (1.07 km^{2})
  - Water: 0 sq mi (0.00 km^{2})
- Elevation: 705 ft (215 m)

Population (2020)
  - Total: 350
  - Density: 845.7/sq mi (326.51/km^{2})
- Time zone: UTC-6 (Central (CST))
  - Summer (DST): UTC-5 (CDT)
- ZIP Code: 74366
- Area codes: 539/918
- FIPS code: 40-69050
- GNIS feature ID: 2413314

Spavinaw is a town in Mayes County, Oklahoma, United States. The population was 350 at the 2020 census, down from 437 in 2010. The town is best known as the birthplace of baseball player Mickey Mantle. It is also notable for the nearby Lake Spavinaw, the principal source of water for Tulsa.

== History ==
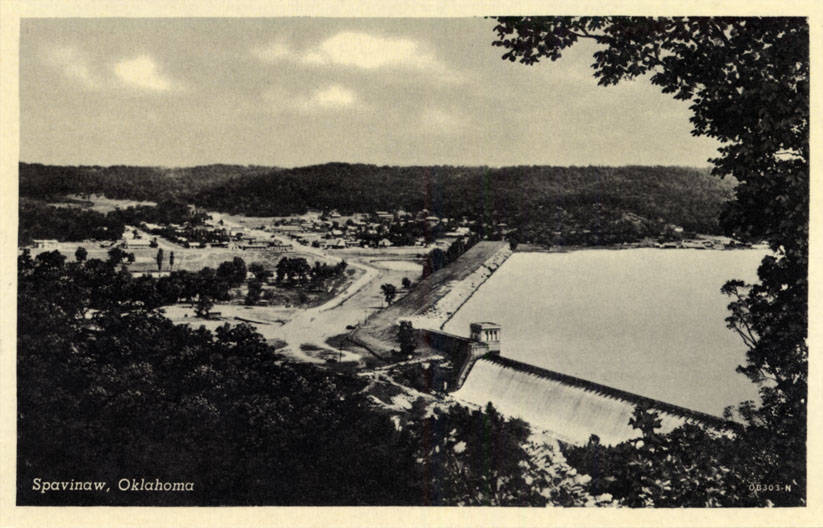
Spavinaw, Oklahoma

The town is named for Spavinaw Creek, a stream named by French traders and explorers who travelled here in the 18th century. According to historian Muriel Wright, the name was a corrupted form of the French word ce'pee (meaning "young growth or shoots of wood") plus the French adjective vineux (wine colored). This term referred to a description of the color of black jack, post, and red oak trees, which grow here in springtime.

The first recorded settler here was Lewis Rogers, son of Captain John Rogers. Lewis set up a mill, a distillery, and a salt works in 1829. In 1839, the Creek began moving into the Spavinaw area of Indian Territory as a result of Indian removal. The Cherokee council outlawed the operation of distilleries in their area and dispossessed Rogers of his distillery and the salt works, both of which had already been damaged by a flooding of Spavinaw Creek.

In 1846, Jacob Croft, a Mormon en route to Utah, decided to settle here instead. Joseph Lynch Martin hired him to restore the mill. In 1855, a group of Mormon missionaries from Utah arrived at Croft's home and began converting Cherokees and Creeks. When they began urging the converts to move to Utah, Lewis Rogers complained to the Cherokee council. In October 1856, Chief John Ross ordered all Mormons out of the Cherokee Nation.

After the Civil War, Joseph "Greenbrier Joe" Lynch, brother-in-law of Joseph Lynch Martin, began operating the mill and the salt works. Greenbrier Joe had saved enough money to buy 100,000 acres (40,000 ha). The community that grew up around these works became known as "Lynch's Mill". In October 1878, the community was renamed Spavinaw Mills.

== Lake Spavinaw ==
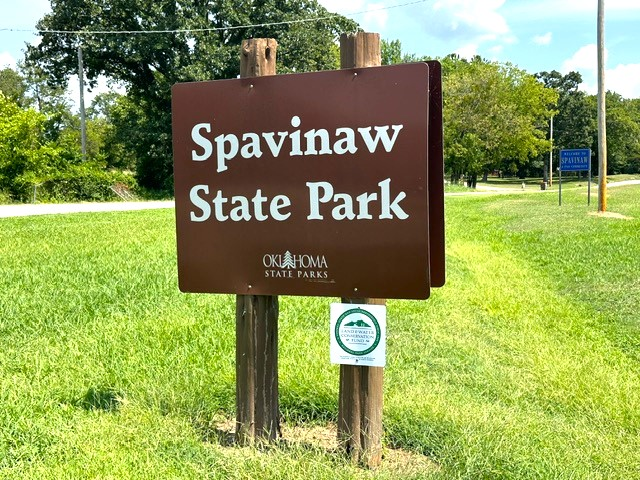
Sign at Spavinaw State Park, August 2026. The tiny blue sign in the background is the Welcome sign for the town.

After the city of Tulsa began the Spavinaw Water Project in the 1920s, construction began on the Spavinaw Dam, which created Lake Spavinaw from Spavinaw Creek. The project submerged the site of the former Spavinaw Mills. The residents moved a short distance to found a new town called Spavinaw.

== Spavinaw State Park ==
Spavinaw State Park, also known as the Spavinaw Area at Grand Lake State Park, was constructed in the early 1930’s to 1938 timeframe by the Civilian Conservation Corps as an accompanying public recreation facility for Lake Spavinaw. It is located below the spillway on the western end of the lake, along Spavinaw Creek, just outside the town of Spavinaw.

== Geography ==
Spavinaw is in northeastern Mayes County, on the north side of Spavinaw Creek about 4 miles (6 km) upstream from its confluence with the Neosho River in Lake Hudson. State Highways 20 and 82 pass through the town as Main Street. The combined highways lead southwest 13 miles (21 km) to Salina. They split 1 mile (2 km) north of town, with Highway 20 leading east 15 miles (24 km) to Jay and Highway 82 leading north 4 miles (6 km) to Langley.

According to the U.S. Census Bureau, the town has a total area of 0.4 square miles (1.0 km^{2}), all land. The Spavinaw Dam, forming Lake Spavinaw, the main water supplier of the city of Tulsa, is directly east of the town limits. Tulsa is 50 miles (80 km) west of the town.

=== Climate ===
Climate data for Spavinaw, Oklahoma (1991–2020 normals, extremes 1923–present)
Month	Jan	Feb	Mar	Apr	May	Jun	Jul	Aug	Sep	Oct	Nov	Dec	Year
Record high °F (°C)	78 (26)	85 (29)	92 (33)	94 (34)	100 (38)	106 (41)	113 (45)	114 (46)	107 (42)	98 (37)	85 (29)	80 (27)	114 (46)
Mean maximum °F (°C)	68.2 (20.1)	72.2 (22.3)	79.3 (26.3)	84.3 (29.1)	89.0 (31.7)	93.3 (34.1)	98.5 (36.9)	99.1 (37.3)	94.0 (34.4)	85.9 (29.9)	77.0 (25.0)	69.4 (20.8)	100.5 (38.1)
Mean daily maximum °F (°C)	48.1 (8.9)	53.0 (11.7)	61.9 (16.6)	70.5 (21.4)	77.9 (25.5)	86.0 (30.0)	91.0 (32.8)	90.7 (32.6)	83.3 (28.5)	72.9 (22.7)	60.8 (16.0)	50.8 (10.4)	70.6 (21.4)
Daily mean °F (°C)	37.2 (2.9)	41.5 (5.3)	49.9 (9.9)	58.9 (14.9)	67.8 (19.9)	76.5 (24.7)	81.1 (27.3)	80.2 (26.8)	72.5 (22.5)	61.6 (16.4)	49.7 (9.8)	40.5 (4.7)	59.8 (15.4)
Mean daily minimum °F (°C)	26.2 (−3.2)	29.9 (−1.2)	37.9 (3.3)	47.4 (8.6)	57.8 (14.3)	66.9 (19.4)	71.3 (21.8)	69.7 (20.9)	61.6 (16.4)	50.4 (10.2)	38.5 (3.6)	30.2 (−1.0)	49.0 (9.4)
Mean minimum °F (°C)	9.8 (−12.3)	12.9 (−10.6)	19.7 (−6.8)	30.7 (−0.7)	42.5 (5.8)	55.7 (13.2)	62.6 (17.0)	60.8 (16.0)	47.5 (8.6)	33.8 (1.0)	22.0 (−5.6)	13.9 (−10.1)	5.5 (−14.7)
Record low °F (°C)	−25 (−32)	−12 (−24)	−4 (−20)	19 (−7)	31 (−1)	47 (8)	44 (7)	48 (9)	34 (1)	19 (−7)	7 (−14)	−11 (−24)	−25 (−32)
Average precipitation inches (mm)	2.27 (58)	2.29 (58)	3.71 (94)	4.64 (118)	6.33 (161)	5.05 (128)	3.75 (95)	3.80 (97)	4.43 (113)	4.14 (105)	3.67 (93)	2.53 (64)	46.61 (1,184)
Average snowfall inches (cm)	1.7 (4.3)	0.8 (2.0)	1.8 (4.6)	0.0 (0.0)	0.0 (0.0)	0.0 (0.0)	0.0 (0.0)	0.0 (0.0)	0.0 (0.0)	0.0 (0.0)	0.3 (0.76)	0.9 (2.3)	5.5 (14)
Average precipitation days (≥ 0.01 in)	5.7	6.3	8.2	8.6	9.9	8.5	7.0	6.1	7.0	8.1	7.0	6.1	88.5
Average snowy days (≥ 0.1 in)	0.7	0.4	0.4	0.0	0.0	0.0	0.0	0.0	0.0	0.0	0.2	0.5	2.2
Source: NOAA

== Demographics ==
Historical population
Census	Pop.	Note	%±
1940	255		—
1950	213		−16.5%
1960	319		49.8%
1970	470		47.3%
1980	623		32.6%
1990	432		−30.7%
2000	563		30.3%
2010	437		−22.4%
2020	350		−19.9%
U.S. Decennial Census

=== 2020 census ===
As of the 2020 census, Spavinaw had a population of 350. The median age was 51.2 years. 19.7% of residents were under the age of 18 and 22.9% of residents were 65 years of age or older. For every 100 females there were 107.1 males, and for every 100 females age 18 and over there were 99.3 males age 18 and over.

0.0% of residents lived in urban areas, while 100.0% lived in rural areas.

There were 159 households in Spavinaw, of which 24.5% had children under the age of 18 living in them. Of all households, 35.8% were married-couple households, 25.8% were households with a male householder and no spouse or partner present, and 29.6% were households with a female householder and no spouse or partner present. About 31.4% of all households were made up of individuals and 15.0% had someone living alone who was 65 years of age or older.

There were 229 housing units, of which 30.6% were vacant. The homeowner vacancy rate was 3.3% and the rental vacancy rate was 19.0%.

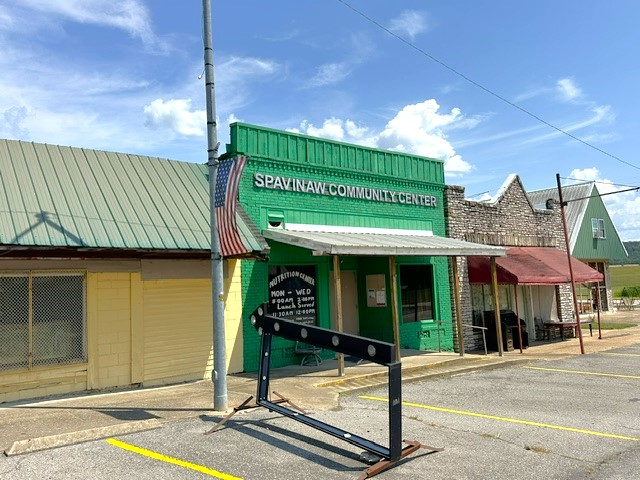
Spavinaw Community Center, as seen in August of 2026

Racial composition as of the 2020 census
Race	Number	Percent
White	212	60.6%
Black or African American	0	0.0%
American Indian and Alaska Native	82	23.4%
Asian	1	0.3%
Native Hawaiian and Other Pacific Islander	0	0.0%
Some other race	5	1.4%
Two or more races	50	14.3%
Hispanic or Latino (of any race)	9	2.6%

=== 2010 census ===
At the 2010 census, Spavinaw had a population of 437. The racial and ethnic composition of the population was 59.3% non-Hispanic, white 27.9%, non-Hispanic Native American 2.1%, Hispanic Native American, 9.2% reporting two or more races and 4.3% Hispanic or Latino of any race.

=== 2000 census ===
As of the census of 2000, there were 563 people, 215 households, and 141 families residing in the town. The population density was 1,450.8 inhabitants per square mile (560.2/km^{2}). There were 290 housing units at an average density of 747.3 per square mile (288.5/km^{2}). The racial makeup of the town was 63.06% White, 26.11% Native American, 0.53% from other races, and 10.30% from two or more races. Hispanic or Latino of any race were 3.73% of the population.

There were 215 households, out of which 30.7% had children under the age of 18 living with them, 44.7% were married couples living together, 15.8% had a female householder with no husband present, and 34.0% were non-families. 29.3% of all households were made up of individuals, and 15.3% had someone living alone who was 65 years of age or older. The average household size was 2.62 and the average family size was 3.24.

In the town, the population was spread out, with 30.0% under the age of 18, 8.9% from 18 to 24, 25.0% from 25 to 44, 21.1% from 45 to 64, and 14.9% who were 65 years of age or older. The median age was 34 years. For every 100 females, there were 95.5 males. For every 100 females age 18 and over, there were 87.6 males.

The median income for a household in the town was $19,792, and the median income for a family was $22,188. Males had a median income of $24,028 versus $17,750 for females. The per capita income for the town was $11,010. Approximately 28.7% of families and 27.7% of the population were below the poverty line, including 38.2% of those under the age of 18 and 13.8% of those 65 and older.

== Education ==
The majority of Spavinaw is in the Jay Public Schools school district. A northern portion is in the Adair Public Schools school district.

== Notable people ==
- Mickey Mantle (1931–1995), Major League Baseball Hall of Fame player for the New York Yankees
- Audra Smoke-Conner (born 1968), Cherokee Nation tribal councilor (2003–2007)

== See also ==
Oklahoma Historical Society. Chronicles of Oklahoma."Lynch's Mill was Spavinaw's Name in Early History." September 1927. Electronic version accessed January 18, 2011.
