= Flooding and flood control in Tulsa =

River flooding in Oklahoma, USA

The combination of topographic and climatic factors in the Tulsa, Oklahoma area have frequently caused major flash flooding, especially near streams that normally drain the area. The city was founded atop a bluff on the Arkansas River. Thus, elevation protected most of the inhabitants and their possessions from damage when the river flooded. However, by the turn of the 20th century the population growth had moved closer to the river, and the flatlands west of the Arkansas had begun to develop as well. The floods typically caused widespread property damage and sometimes death. By the 1920s, seasonal floods of the Arkansas began to cause serious damage and loss of life. Since its founding, city leaders had responded to such events by simply rebuilding and replacing the property that had been destroyed in situ. Not until 1970 did the city government begin developing strategies to mitigate floods or at least minimize property damage and prevent loss of life. This article describes some of the more notable floods in Tulsa, then the mitigation and control strategies that evolved from them.

Floods continued to endanger life and property, as the city encroaches on the surrounding farm land. City authorities decided that then-existing Federal guidelines were inadequate to control the local situation and began to develop more stringent requirements. The Tulsa plan has evolved and now affects the entire watershed, including other communities in the Tulsa metropolitan area.

Although floods cannot be totally prevented, the Tulsa flood control program has been recognized as a success by the Federal Emergency Management Agency (FEMA) and several other organizations. The control efforts will go on as long as people live in vulnerable areas.

== Major floods ==
Flood records are sparse before 1900.

=== 1908 flood ===
In 1908, only a year after statehood, Arkansas River flooding at Tulsa caused $250,000 in damages ($8.75 million in 2024 dollars). The city was mostly on top of a bluff along the river, thus spared flooding. However, the railroad bridge across the river was washed away, disrupting railroad traffic westward until the bridge could be replaced.

=== 1923 flood ===
By 1920, the oil boom had generated such rapid growth that real estate was being developed on low ground near the Arkansas River, On June 13, 1923, the river flooded these low-lying areas, causing $500,000 in damages ($9.23 million in 2024 dollars), and leaving 4,000 homeless. The flood included Tulsa's waterworks, which were located at what is now Newblock Park, The new waterworks were built on higher ground northeast of downtown Tulsa, near Bird Creek. This 2,800 acres (11,000,000 m^{2}) area became Mohawk Park, one of the nation's largest city parks. The city also issued its first flood control plan, attempting to put housing on higher ground and reserving the lowlands for parks.

=== 1943 flood ===
Another flood on the Arkansas River threatened the oil refineries in West Tulsa in 1943. The U. S. Army Corps of Engineers (USACE) immediately built levees around the refineries, which were considered vital for the U. S. military in World War II. A provision in the Lower Mississippi Flood Control Act of 1928 had authorized the USACE to construct dams and levees as needed to control flooding. Even so, the flood killed 21 people, injured 26 and left about 4,000 homeless. Though monetary damages have not surfaced, 413 houses were destroyed and 3,800 were damaged.

=== 1970 flood ===
As Tulsa expanded into the surrounding countryside after WWII, flooding of urbanized areas frequently recurred, usually every two to four years. In 1966, Tulsa annexed the Mingo Creek watershed. The Mother's Day flood of 1970 in Tulsa caused $163,000 in damages ($1.32 million in 2024 dollars) to the rapidly developing areas along Mingo and Joe creeks in the eastern part of the city. Still, recovery consisted of repairing or replacing flooded structures in their original locations.

=== 1974 floods ===
Three floods occurred in April and May 1974. Damages were estimated at $744,000 ($4.74 million in 2024 dollars) along Bird Creek. In June, floods occurred along Fry, Haikey, Joe and Mingo Creeks. This time damages were estimated at over $18 million ($115 million in 2024 dollars). Mingo Creek flooded again on September 19, 1974. (Note: Editor's note: No damage estimate was given for this flood.)

=== 1976 flood ===
The 1976 Memorial Day flood marked a milestone in Tulsa's search for flood solutions. A three-hour, 10-inch deluge occurred over the headwaters of Mingo, Joe and Haikey creeks. The resulting flood killed three people and caused $40 million in damages ($221 million in 2024 dollars) to more than 3,000 buildings.

=== 1984 flood ===
A cold front that stalled over the Tulsa area on May 26–27, 1984 dropped between 6 and 15 inches (15 and 38 cm) of rain, flooding several parts of the city. The floods killed 14 people and caused $180 million ($545 million in 2024 dollars) worth of property damage. The areas along Mingo Creek in eastern Tulsa and Cherry Creek in West Tulsa were particularly hard hit.

=== 1986 flood ===
In September 1986, the remnants from a hurricane in southwestern Mexico arrived in the Tulsa area and caused a rainfall of 24 inches (61 cm) northwest of Keystone Lake. So much rain fell in such a short time, that there was a risk that the lake level would reach the top of the dam. The U.S. Army Corps of Engineers (USACE) needed to open the flood gates and release as much as 300,000 cfs of water into the Arkansas River. That rate would cause record flooding along the river from Keystone to Muskogee. Many people living near the river in Tulsa voluntarily evacuated. Mandatory evacuations were ordered in Jenks and Bixby. A privately owned levee in West Tulsa failed, causing an estimated $1.3 million ($3.73 million in 2024 dollars) in damages. Sixty four buildings were damaged, including thirteen which would have to be demolished. Other nearby areas reported damages as: $32.5 million ($93.2 million in 2024 dollars) in Sand Springs and $13.4 million ($38.4 million in 2024 dollars). Tulsa County reported damages of $63.5 million ($182 million in 2024 dollars).

=== 2019 flood ===
In May 2019, a series of severe thunderstorms dropped precipitation across northern Oklahoma. The water ran down streams and into Keystone Lake. In response, the US Army Corps of Engineers began to release water from the Keystone Dam into the Arkansas River.

In preparation for another wave of storms, the US Army Corps cut back on how much water was being released into the river, hoping to allow its waters to recede enough to handle additional rain.

The second wave of severe thunderstorms dropped record-breaking amounts of rain and spawned numerous tornadoes. This additional rain also cascaded into Keystone Lake, among others, and the Army Corps was forced to open the gates further.

The following day, as water continued to fill the lake, the Army Corps struggled to balance the water entering and leaving the lake. However, they had no choice but to continue to lift the gates higher or risk the water levels overtaking the dam.

The resulting flow downstream began to threaten neighborhoods and cities. Areas of Sapulpa, Southern Broken Arrow (known as Indian Springs), and Bixby, Oklahoma were submerged.

On May 22, the gates were raised incrementally higher throughout the day. Webbers Falls was evacuated as the town began to sink into the water.

The water along the riverbanks in Tulsa began to rise heavily, causing Sand Springs and Jenks Public Schools to cancel classes for the rest of the school year due to flooding concerns. Sinkholes began popping up in and around the Tulsa area, with reports of cars driving into them. Structures built along the riverfront, such as the River Spirit Casino and Riverwalk, were preemptively closed and began to be encapsulated in the river as well as other known flood plain locations like the Tulsa Zoo.

Governor Kevin Stitt and Tulsa Mayor G. T. Bynum flew over the Tulsa metro to view the flooding and declared a state of emergency for 66 counties.

As the day turned into night, another wave of heavy storms began to form near Oklahoma City, heading towards Tulsa. Barges broke loose on the river heading towards the Webbers Falls Lock and Dam, threatening to collide into the structure. The barges went missing as night fell and were not located until the morning.

On the morning of May 23, the Keystone flood gates continued to be lifted as the Flood Pool reached 100% capacity, increasing the flow to 221,000 cfs with plans to raise that to 250,000 cfs by noon. The National Weather Service in Tulsa increased the forecast level of the Arkansas River from 21 feet to 23 feet, putting the river in major flood stage and only 2 feet shy of levels reached in October 1986.

Meanwhile, the barges broke free again shortly before 11AM, once again threatening the dam. Shortly before noon, the barges collided into the dam and sank. After an inspection of the dam, it was declared to have received minimal damage.

On May 24, Governor Stitt expanded a state of emergency to include all 77 counties of Oklahoma. President Trump approved the disaster declaration the following day, ordering Federal assistance to supplement State, tribal, and local responses.

The Army Corps planned to continue releasing at 250,000 cfs through Sunday, May 26. After additional thunderstorms during the night of May 24–25, the Corps changed their plans to continue at this pace until Wednesday, May 29 and suggested additional precipitation could lead to another extension.

Mayor Bynum also urged citizens protected by levees to begin making voluntary plans for evacuation. He stated that, even though the levees were currently doing their job, they had never been tested to this extent.

Additional storms during the night of May 25–26 prompted the Corps to extend their release schedule yet another day to May 30. They also increased the rate of release into the Arkansas initially to 265,000 cfs and then raising it to 275,000 the next morning.

In the early hours of Memorial Day, yet another round of severe storms dropped precipitation along the upper Arkansas River Basin in northwestern and north central Oklahoma as well as south central Kansas.

On May 28, the lake finally overcame a major hurdle and began to recede. Predicted storms had gone south of the dam, allowing for the lake waters to stabilize.

The following day, even as another round of storms was going through Tulsa, the Army Corps announced they would begin cutting back the releases at the dam. At 4pm, the flow was reduced to 265,000 cfs followed by a 10,000 cfs reduction every 6 hours. Their goal was to reduce the rate to 150,000 cfs by Saturday and 100,000 cfs early the following week. Meanwhile, the storms over Tulsa had increased the height of the river by 6 inches, but again had not greatly impacted Keystone Lake. However, the river quickly receded below the height of the previous day.

== Mitigation and protection ==
Tulsa's government responded to the 1970 flood by joining the "emergency program" of the National Flood Insurance Program (NFIP) and promising to adopt federal floodplain regulations. In August 1971, NFIP issued its block rate maps. A month later, on Labor Day, Flat Rock, Bird and Haikey creeks flooded, affecting many suburban communities. In December, Bird Creek flooded again. Tulsa then joined the NFIP's "regular" program, adopted a new 100-year flood standard, and promised to regulate floodplain land use.

After the three floods in 1974, the victims demanded more action by the city, which they claimed was not enforcing the NFIP regulations. They tried to halt development, to avoid more flood damage until existing problems could be solved. Developers strongly objected, starting a debate over floodplain management, called "Tulsa's great drainage war" by the local media, which lasted for several years. The city came up to meet the managers' with a plan to widen part of Mingo Creek. One part of the plan included removing damaged structures. Thirty three houses in the right of way were removed just before the next flood.

The 1984 flood demonstrated that emergency managers could not receive accurate data quickly enough about the progress of flooding. This was true throughout the state, as well as in Tulsa. Information from airport radars, updated hourly, was inadequate to meet the managers' needs. The University of Oklahoma and Oklahoma State University collaborated with the Climatological Survey and other public and private agencies to create the Oklahoma Mesonet. This system collects weather information (e.g., wind speed, rainfall, temperature) every 5 minutes from 120 Mesonet stations throughout Oklahoma. Emergency planners can now monitor up-to-date weather information in advance of the arrival of an approaching storm. The article quoted an official of the Tulsa Area Emergency Management as saying that his staff uses the Oklahoma Mesonet every day.

in 1985, Tulsa centralized responsibility for all city flood, drainage, and stormwater programs in a Department of Stormwater Management . A stormwater utility fee was established by ordinance in 1986 to operate the program. Owners of all properties in the city are required to pay the fee, which was established by an ordinance at $2.58 per month. Business property is taxed at $2.58 per month for each 2,650 square feet (246 m^{2}) of impervious surface. The ordinance allotted the entire fee exclusively for floodplain and stormwater management activities, and ensured stable funding for maintenance and management.

Tulsa's flood protection plan has three objectives: prevent new problems; correct existing problems; improve safety, environment and quality of life.

The city officials believed that the standards set by the NFIP were inadequate, based on Tulsa's previous experience. Tulsa requires that floodplains be defined based on anticipated future development, rather than on development conditions at the time. NFIP also requires that the lowest level of structures within the floodplain be at or above the elevation of the existing 100 year flood. Tulsa requires and enforces an additional one-foot (30.5 cm) of freeboard above flood elevation. Before a property that lies within the floodplain can be altered, the owner must obtain a watershed development permit.

== Recognition of progress ==
In the early 1990s, FEMA ranked Tulsa first in the nation for its floodplain management program. allowing Tulsans to enjoy the nation's lowest flood insurance rates. The program was also honored with FEMA's 1992 Outstanding Public Service Award; and the Association of State Floodplain Managers has twice given Tulsa its Local Award for Excellence.

FEMA increased Tulsa's community rating from Class 5 to Class 3, making Tulsans eligible for a 35 percent discount on flood insurance premiums. The previous Class 5 rating had provided a 25 percent discount. The ratings are periodically adjusted to reflect a community's reduced risk through its efforts to improve "...public information, mapping and regulations, flood preparedness and flood damage reduction. The discounts are in five percent increments from Class 9 (five percent) to Class 1 (45 percent)." As of 2000, Tulsa was the only U.S. community rated as Class 3.

Specific activities that FEMA cited were:"...acquisition of nearly a thousand flood-prone properties and the preservation of more than a quarter of its floodplain as open space; strong building codes, including the requirement of a two-foot safety factor (freeboard) in floodplain construction; and community outreach to advise residents of flood hazards and offer mitigation solutions and technical assistance."
