= Spavinaw Water Project =

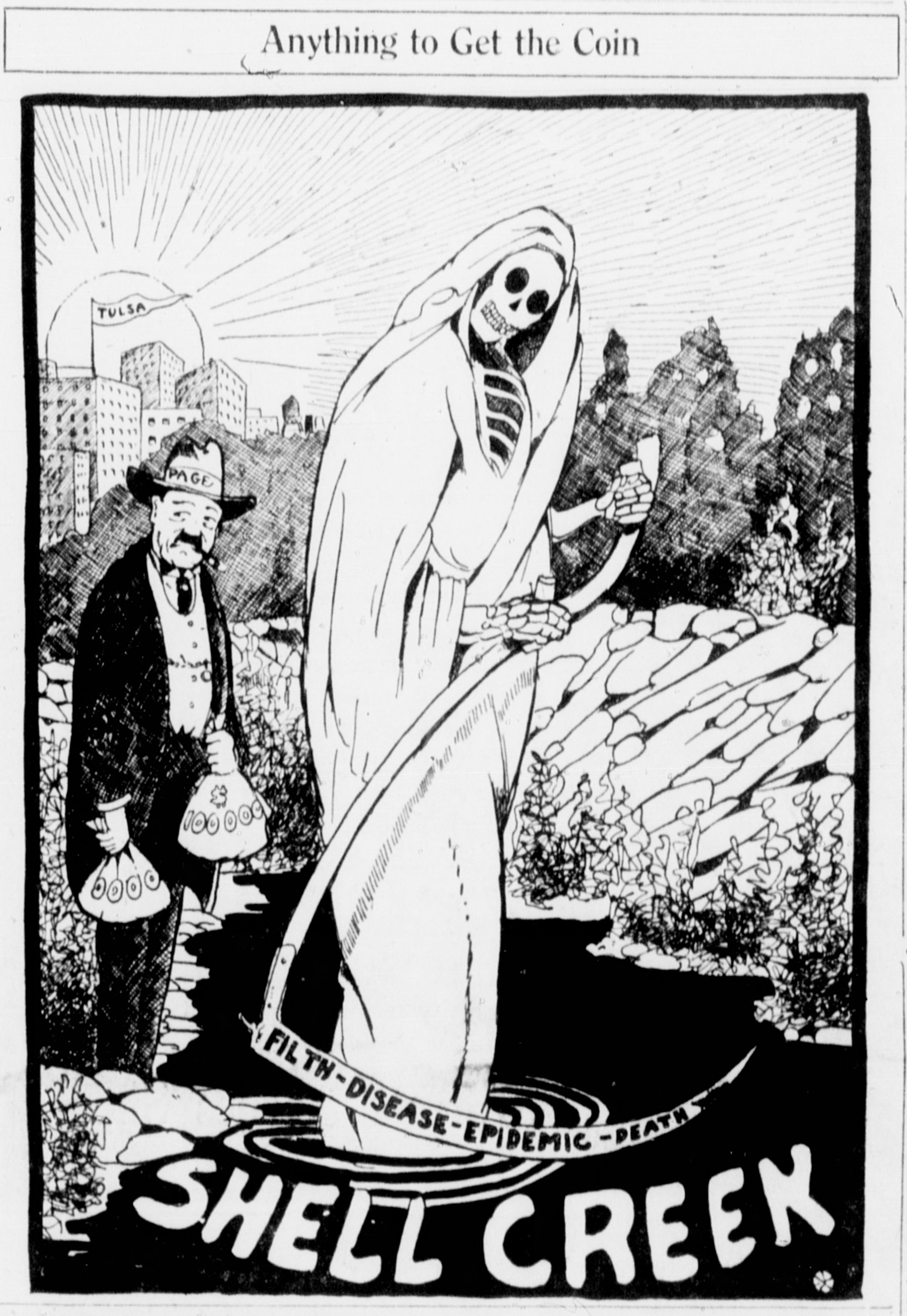
Coverage of the Spavinaw Water Project by the Tulsa World which was owned by Eugene Lorton

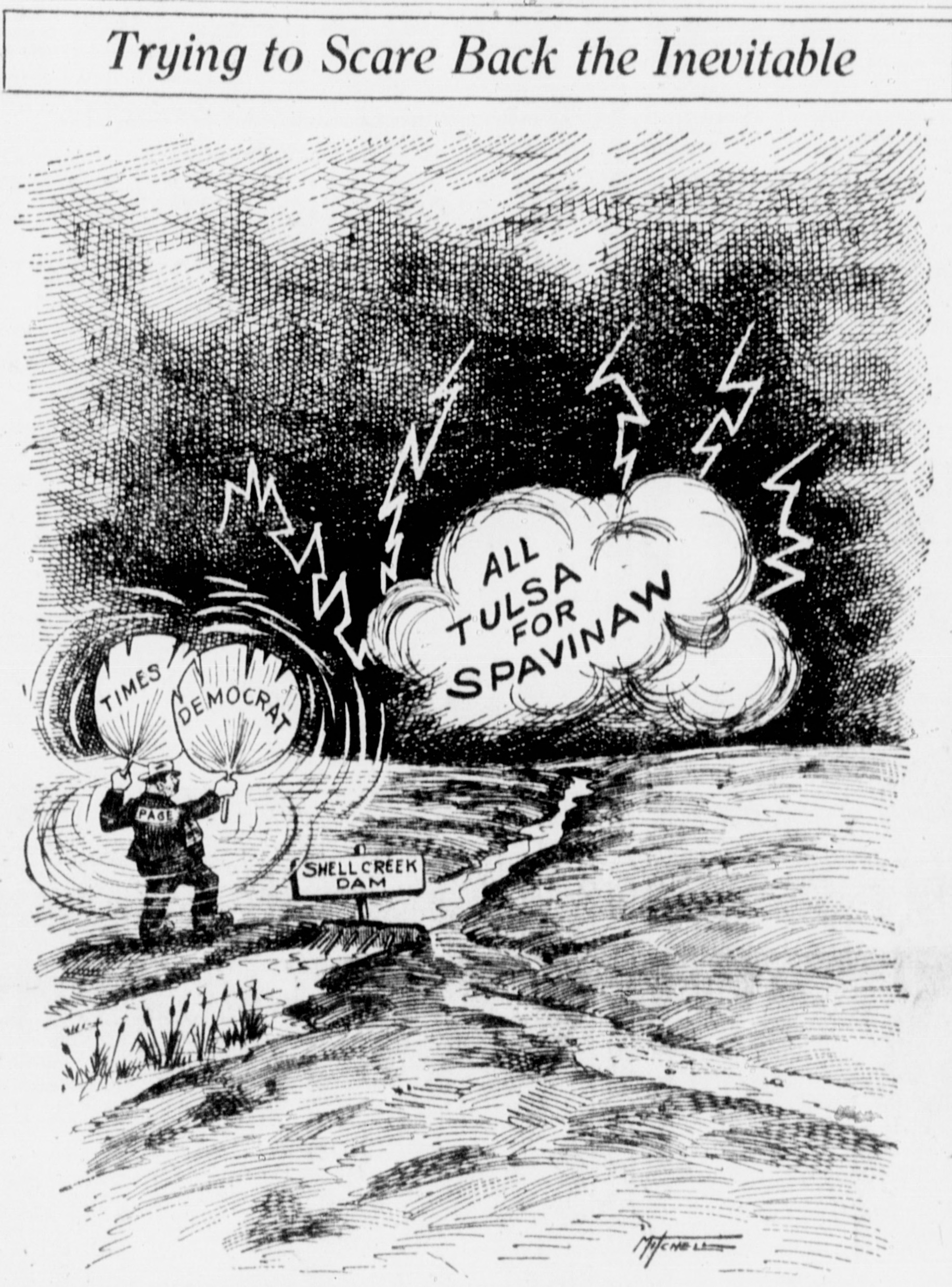
Coverage of the Spavinaw Water Project by the Tulsa World

The Spavinaw Water Project was established to provide fresh water for Tulsa, Oklahoma from a site on Spavinaw Creek near the town of Spavinaw in Mayes County, Oklahoma. Planning and financing began in 1919, The project scope included site selection, designing and constructing a dam to impound the creek, a 55-mile long pipeline to carry water to a reservoir near Tulsa, where it would be treated and pumped to a network of customers. Groundbreaking occurred in October, 1922. The dam and pipeline were both completed in 1924, and the new Tulsa water treating plant was completed in 1929. At that time, this was the longest gravity-flow water pipeline operational in the United States.

== Background ==
According to an article written by Dr. Fred S. Clinton, a pioneer Tulsa physician, there were a number of freshwater springs in the immediate vicinity. However, it soon became apparent that these could not support the needs of the rapidly expanding population. The city built a pumping plant in 1904 to deliver water from the Arkansas River to consumers via a standpipe atop Standpipe Hill, north of downtown Tulsa. The standpipe has since been demolished.

However, the source soon proved unsatisfactory for domestic use, because the water was high in silt, salt and gypsum. Drilled wells also proved unsuitable, because the water was either hard and salty or ran dry after a relatively short time.

Although bottled water was available, the supply was inadequate to support the requirements of a large population. Tulsans were already buying about 50,000 five-gallon bottles of drinking water a year by 1919. Finding a new source quickly was essential, but this quickly became a political controversy.

== Alternative proposals ==
In 1915, a committee composed of several leading Tulsa businessmen began studying alternative proposals for securing a satisfactory water supply. They considered Shell Creek, Spavinaw Creek, Grand River and other local wells. However, they were unable to agree on any one system and disbanded without issuing a report. The next mayor of Tulsa, O. D. Hunt, decided that building a filtration plant would allow usage of water from the Arkansas River at a far lower cost. He soon approved a plan to build such a plant for $250,000. Tulsa voted for a bond issue to raise the money, and the plant was built at the future site of Newblock Park. Unfortunately, the process failed to meet design specifications and was soon abandoned. Tulsa waterworks engineer W. R. Holway, who had been hired to make the plant work properly, recommended that the city spend no more money trying to make the Arkansas River water potable because it also had a higher salt content than sea water.

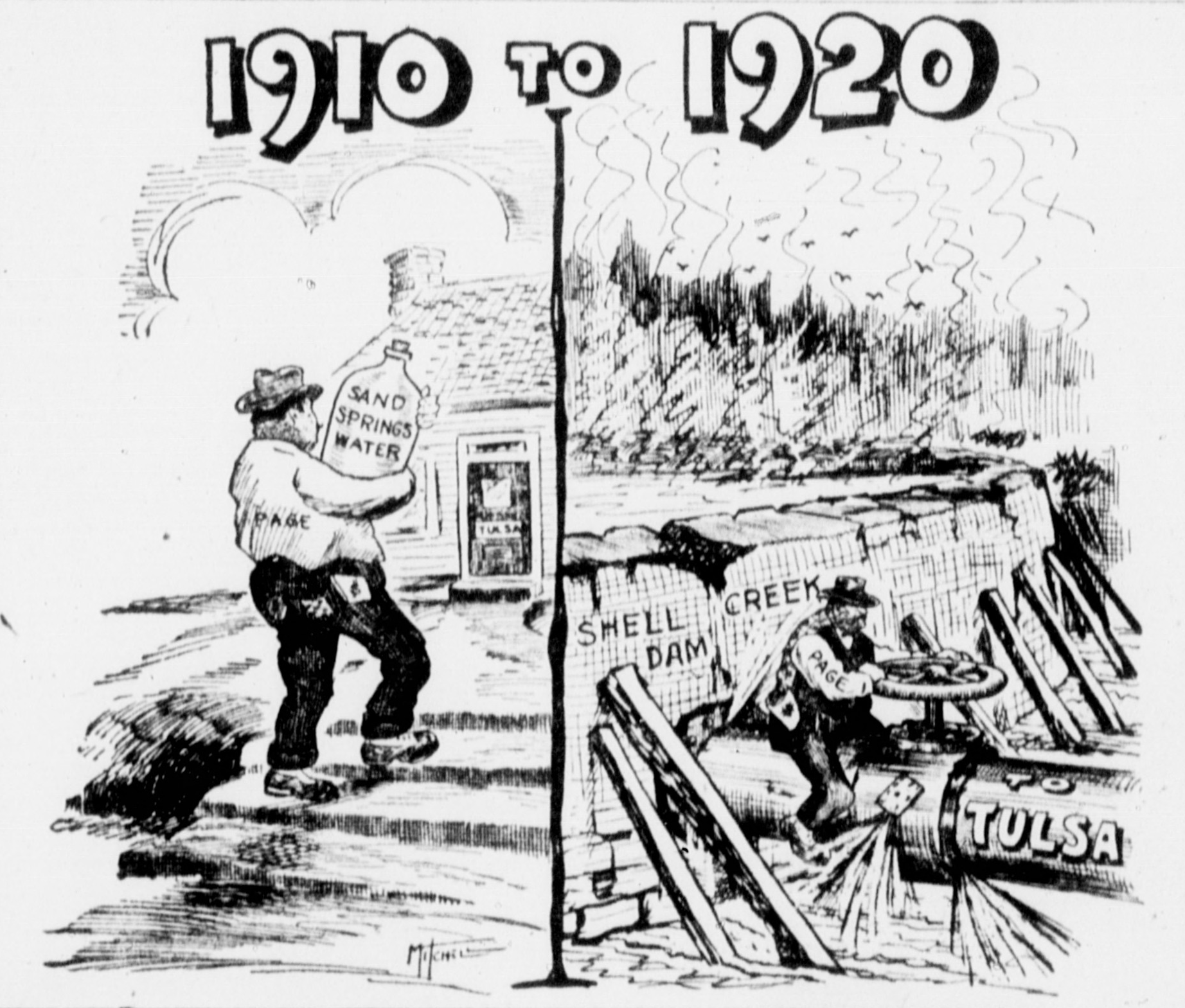
Tulsa World (owned by Eugene Lorton) coverage of Charles Page's dam on Shell Creek, which created Shell Lake, near Sand Springs, Oklahoma

The next mayor, C. H. Hunt, hired H. A. Pressey to resolve the water supply controversy in 1918. In due course, Pressey accepted Spavinaw Creek as the best source, and rejected the other proposals. Pressey's plan was to build a dam on Spavinaw Creek, construct three intermediate reservoirs and pumping stations to move water to the vicinity of Tulsa, then use the old Arkansas River pump station to get the water into the Tulsa distribution system. Pressey estimated the cost of the project at 5 million dollars. In 1919, Mayor Hubbard called for an election to pass a 5 million dollar bond issue to implement the Pressey proposal. The bond issue passed.

By this time, T. C. Hughes had become the engineer for an organization called the Taxpayers League. The League opposed Pressey's plan, although they supported the idea of using Spavinaw as the source. It backed W. Tate Brady in a lawsuit to block the sale of the bonds. The suit eventually went to the Oklahoma Supreme Court, which imposed a permanent injunction against the bond sale.

== Shell Creek proposal ==
Charles Page owned the Sand Springs Bottling Company, which was the dominant supplier of fresh water for domestic consumption. By 1916, he had built a dam on Shell Creek, which created Shell Lake, near Sand Springs, Oklahoma and proposed to sell fresh water to Tulsa. His proposal competed with the alternative of building a dam on Spavinaw Creek. Heated competition between the two major newspapers, the Tulsa Democrat (owned by Page), which supported the Shell Creek proposal, and the Tulsa World (owned by Eugene Lorton), which supported the Spavinaw plan. Page's proposal was rejected when tests showed that the quantity was inadequate to meet Tulsa's expected needs.

== Creation of Lake Spavinaw system ==
Lake Spavinaw
- Location within Oklahoma
- Location: Mayes County, Oklahoma
- Coordinates: 36.3818°N 95.0477°W
- Primary inflows: Spavinaw Creek
- Primary outflows: 275,000 cubic feet per second
- Max. length: 2,400 ft (730 m)
- Surface area: 1,636 acres (662 ha)
- Average depth: 75 ft (23 m)
- Surface elevation: 679 ft (207 m)
- Settlements: Spavinaw, Oklahoma

The first official mention of Spavinaw Creek, as a potential water source for Tulsa was a letter from the Mayor of Tulsa to the Secretary of the Interior requesting government engineering aid in solving Tulsa's water problem. The letter indicated both Spavinaw Creek and Grand River as potential sources. However, no action resulted from this request.

T. C. Hughes, City Engineer, studied government topographic maps and concluded that water could flow by gravity from Spavinaw to a point west of Catoosa, Oklahoma. Hughes included this in a report he published in 1912, estimating the cost at about 100 million dollars.

In 1920, the Tulsa mayor appointed a non-partisan water board. The board, in turn, hired J. H. Trammell to perform as the engineering contractor to plan the Spavinaw project, with W. R. Holway as his assistant. Trammell later left the firm and Holway took over as project manager. Trammel and Holway found that the gravity flow process previously advocated by T. C. Hughes was not only feasible, but could carry water as far as Lake Yahola, much closer to Tulsa than Hughes had estimated. The board then hired George W. Goethals to review the plan and cost estimate. Goethals assessed that both were feasible and practical, and that Trammel's cost estimate of $6.8 million ($109,286,000 in 2025) was adequate.

Groundbreaking for Spavinaw Dam, near the town of Spavinaw, Oklahoma and about 55 miles northeast of Tulsa, occurred October 19, 1922. It created Lake Spavinaw, which was fed by Spavinaw Creek, a perennial stream that drained 400 square miles of Ozark Mountain foothills and a tributary of Grand River (Oklahoma). The lake has a normal surface area of 2.5 square miles and a capacity of 72,400 acre-feet. The normal storage volume is 38,000 acre-feet. In 1922, a pipeline was begun to bring this water to Lake Yahola, located in Tulsa's Mohawk Park. The project cost $7.5 million ($144,259,000 in 2025). This has been the principal source of Tulsa's domestic water since then.

Lake Yahola has a capacity of 2 billion gallons. The dam was completed in 1924. The line became operational on November 17, 1924, when water first flowed from Lake Spavinaw, through the pipeline and into Lake Yahola. It became the longest gravity-flow system in the U. S. at that time. Five years later, the city completed the Mohawk Water Treating Plant. This plant currently has a capacity to treat 100 million gallons per day of water.

== Expansion of Spavinaw System ==
Tulsa also approved construction of Lake Eucha on Spavinaw Creek, a short distance upstream of Lake Spavinaw. Completed in 1952, Lake Eucha effectively expanded the storage capacity of the Spavinaw system.

Tulsa completed a second Spavinaw pipeline in 1954, doubling the capacity. According to the City of Tulsa, the average monthly water pumpage rate in 2009 was 103 million gallons per day (MGD). The range during that year was 81.5 MGD in February to 138.2 MGD in July.

== See also ==
- Lake Eucha
- Spavinaw, Oklahoma
- Spavinaw Creek
- W. R. Holway

== Bibliography ==
Notes

References

- Clinton, Fred S. (1945). "Tulsa's Water Resources - Springs and Spavinaw". Chronicles of Oklahoma. 23 (1). Oklahoma Historical Society: 59–70. ISSN 0009-6024. LCCN 23027299. OCLC 647927893.
