= Creek Council Oak Tree =

Coordinates: 36.1362°N 95.9901°W

- Creek Nation Council Oak Tree
- U.S. National Register of Historic Places
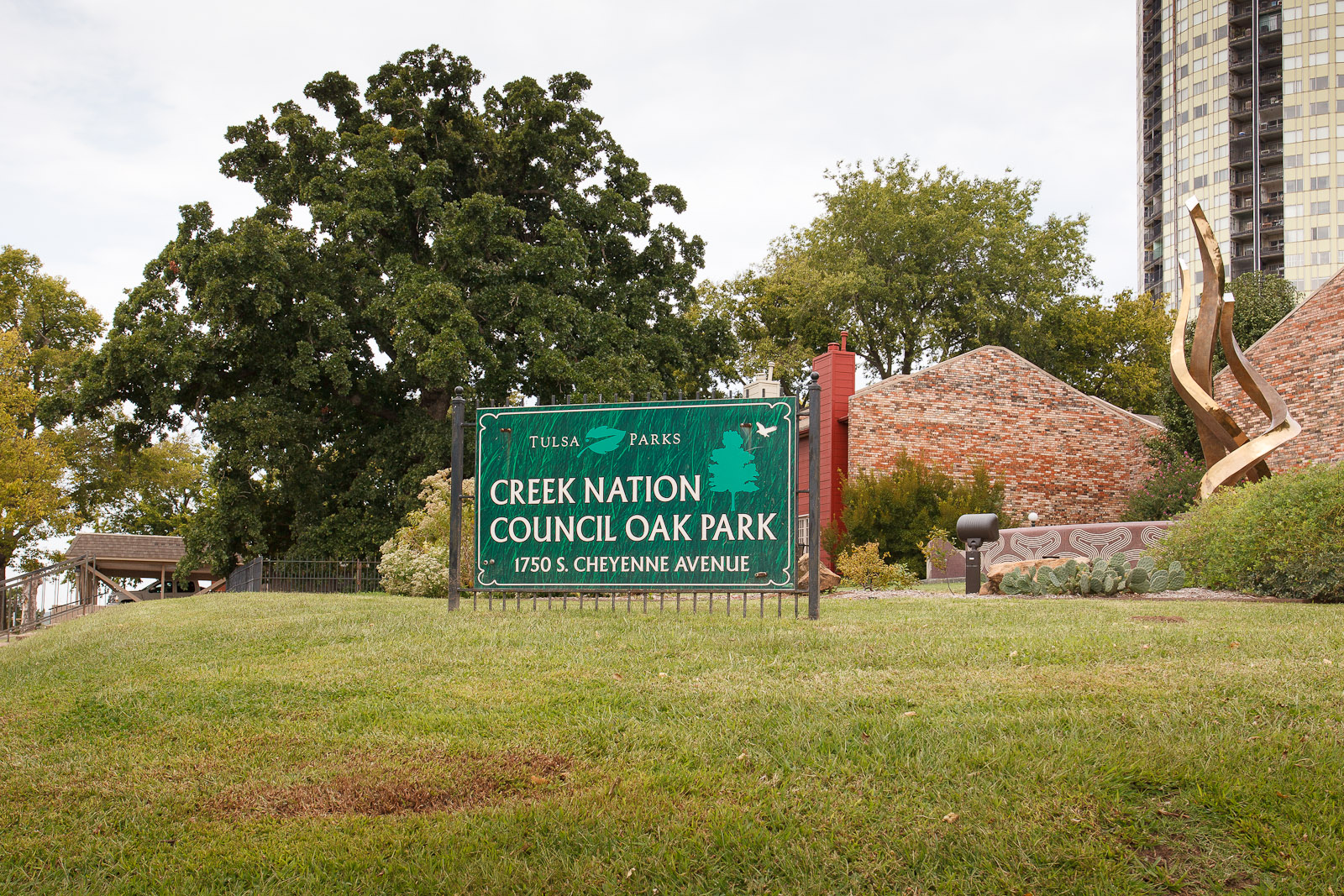
- Creek Council Oak in 2012. Courtesy W. R. Oswald
- Location: Tulsa, Oklahoma, United States
- Architect: Richard Thornton
- NRHP reference No.: 76001576

Significant dates
- Added to NRHP: September 29, 1976
- Designated: Landmark

The Creek Council Oak Tree is a historic landmark which represents the founding of the modern city of Tulsa, Oklahoma, United States by the Lochapoka Tribal Town of the Creek Nation.

The Creeks had been forced to leave their homeland in the southeastern United States (Note: The original Creek homeland lay mainly in the present states of Alabama, Georgia and Mississippi) and travel to land across the Mississippi River, where the U.S. Government had granted them land in what was then known as Indian Territory. In 1836, after their arrival, the Lochapokas chose an oak tree on top of a hill that overlooked the Arkansas River as the site of their council ground. They lit a new ceremonial fire, using coals they had carried on their journey, established a busk ground, where all council business would be conducted. These grounds were also a gathering place for tribal ceremonies, feasts and games. The site continued to be used for these events until 1896. The Creeks still hold an annual celebration of their arrival at this site on October 20.

== History ==
The surviving Creeks then built their village near the Council Oak. They named the village Tvlahasse or "Old Town." (Note: White settlers who came later were unable to pronounce the Creek word properly, so they called the settlement Tulsi (sometimes shown as Tulsey Town) or Tulsa.)

The Council Oak is believed to have been a mature tree when the Creeks arrived. Although its age is not known, the same tree still lives as of 2023. One source claims it is a post oak tree (Quercus stellata). The Tulsa Preservation Commission article identified the tree as a burr oak (Quercus macrocarpa). Both are species of white oak and native to Oklahoma.

Private citizens acquired the land during the early 20th Century. At one time, oilman Harry Ford Sinclair lived in a large house adjacent to the tree; a later owner, the Oral Roberts Evangelistic Association, razed the house but retained the tree. By 1960, it seemed that the tree and its surroundings would be destroyed to create a parking lot. Instead, the Creek Nation and several individuals bought the site, which they donated to the City of Tulsa. The city turned the 1.86 acres (0.75 ha) plot into Creek Nation Council Oak Park. Richard Thornton was named as the architect for the park.

The tree was listed in the National Register of Historic Places under Criterion A, with NRIS number 76001576. The tree was placed in a Historic Preservation Zone at 18th Street and Cheyenne Avenue in Tulsa, Oklahoma in January, 1992. The tree was still living as of 2024. Largely due to the grassroots work done by Riverview Neighborhood Association, and the foundation created by the group to preserve, protect, and promote the historical site, the tree was returned to the Muscogee (Creek) Nation in a ceremony on November 9, 2024.

== Other park features ==
Planting Plan, Creek Nation Council Oak Park

The park contains an ethno-horticultural garden displaying an assortment of plants that the Creeks used in their Alabama homeland. An image of the original planting plan for the park from the Library of Congress Historical American Building Survey (HABS) is shown at right.

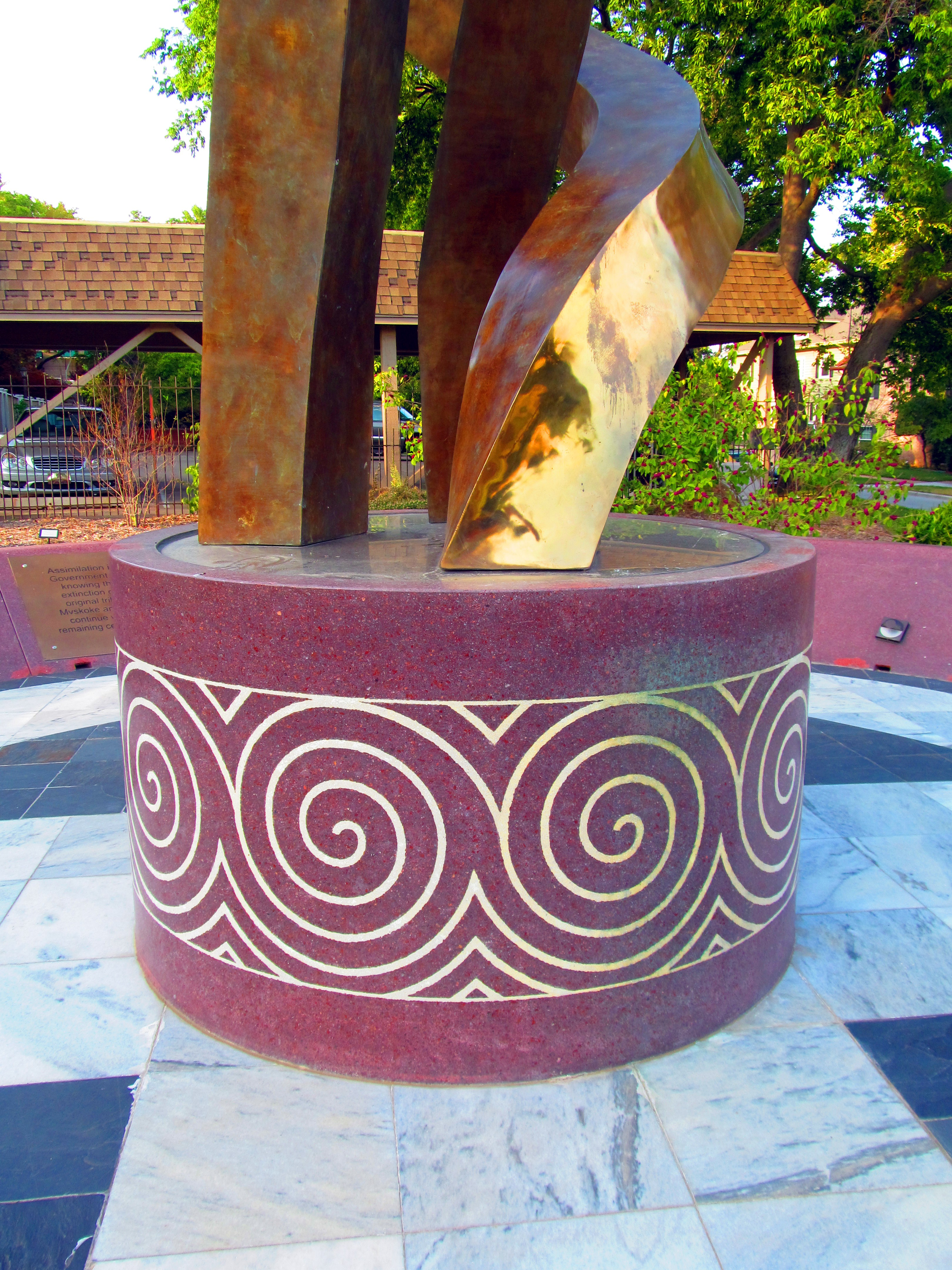
Trail of Tears Memorial Sculpture, 2014

In 2008, the Oklahoma Centennial Commission sponsored a "Trail of Tears" monument honoring the Creeks' suffering as they were forced to endure the trek from Alabama to Indian Territory. (Note: 161 of the 630 Lochapokas who began the trek died along the way.) The sculpture, created by Creek artist Dan Brook, depicts a flame rising from a hearth. It is named Morning Prayer.

== Commemorative painting ==
An oil painting by Mike Larsen titled Creek Council Oak Tree hangs in the Oklahoma Senate wing of the state capitol, over the staircase at the fifth floor. The work was sponsored by former governor Frank Keating and dedicated on March 6, 2002.

== See also ==
- List of individual trees
