= Fred S. Clinton =

Fred Severs Clinton
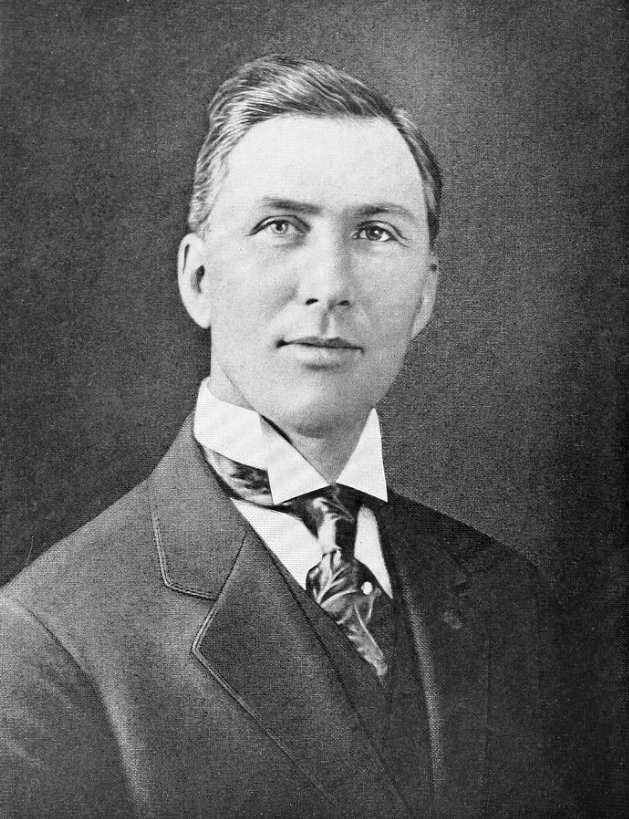
- Born: April 15, 1874; Indian Territory
- Died: April 25, 1955 (aged 81); Tulsa, Oklahoma, US
- Education: Kansas City College of Pharmacy; University Medical College
- Occupation(s): Physician, surgeon

Signature
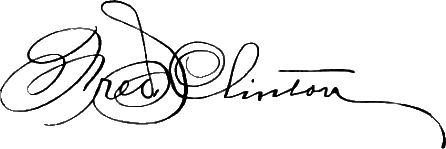

Fred Severs Clinton (1874–1955) was one of the first medical doctors in Oklahoma, having begun to practice while the area was still part of Indian Territory. He built the first hospital in Tulsa and was very active in promoting public health infrastructure projects. As a financial partner with Dr. J. C. W, Bland, another early physician in the Tulsa area, he helped finance the drilling of the Sue A. Bland #1, the first oil well in Red Fork, which helped propel Tulsa into the ranks of a major American city in the early 20th century.

== Early life ==
He was born near the present city of Okmulgee, Oklahoma, on April 15, 1874, to an early Euro-American migrant, Charles Clinton, and his wife, Louise (née Atkins). Mrs. Atkins was Muscogee. Louise died in Tulsa June 20, 1928. The following year, the family moved to a ranch on Duck Creek. In 1884, they moved to the community of Red Fork. His father Charles died in 1888, when he was fourteen. He is listed on the Dawes Rolls as 1/8th Creek by blood and his mother is listed as 1/4th Creek by blood.

Young Fred was educated in the national schools of the Creek Nation then went off to study at St. Francis Institute in Osage, Kansas, Drury College (now Drury University), City Business College (Quincy, Illinois), and Young Harris College in Georgia. Finally, he studied pharmacy at the Kansas City College of Pharmacy (now University of Missouri–Kansas City), where he graduated in 1891 and medicine at University Medical College (now New York University School of Medicine), where he graduated in 1897.

== Marriage ==
In 1897, Fred married Jane Carroll Heard, a native of Elberton, Georgia, who was reported to be an accomplished musician. The two had met when Jane attended commencement ceremonies at Young Harris College. She was from a wealthy and socially prominent Georgia family. When the couple first came to Indian Territory, they could not find any suitable house available in Tulsa, so they moved into the home of her mother-in-law in Red Fork. They were able to find a simple house out in the country (the present-day intersection of Ninth Street and Main Street). They lived there for six years.

== Public health work ==
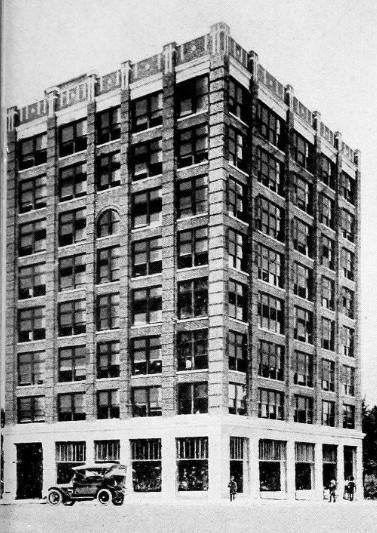
Fred S. Clinton Building

At first, Clinton had no formal office. At the end of the 19th century, Tulsa was still a raw frontier town. Many of his patients were cowboys or railroad workers who had been injured in work-related accidents, bar fights or gun fights. He practiced wherever there was available space.

Clinton worked diligently on many of the public health issues that confronted early-day Tulsa. He campaigned for improved water and sewer systems, public health facilities and fireproof buildings. He was also credited with building the first fireproof office building in Tulsa. The Clinton Building, located on the northwest corner of Fourth Street and Boston Avenue, was demolished in 1928 to make way for the expansion of the Exchange National Bank Building (now known as the 320 South Boston Building).

== Later years and death ==
Clinton organized and was president of the Oklahoma State Hospital Association from 1919 to 1926.

In the early 1930s, Clinton's health began to falter, apparently brought on by anemia. He lost the sight in his right eye, forcing him to give up performing as a surgeon. He began to write about the local history as it pertained to public health and medicine.

In 1932, Clinton was inducted into the Oklahoma Hall of Fame.

Jane Heard Clinton died in Tulsa in 1945. In the following year, Clinton married again, this time to Beulah Jane Elliott. She had been a Tulsa school teacher for many years. Clinton went to St. Johns Hospital on November 16, 1954. He died there April 25, 1955. Memorial services were conducted at the Boston Avenue Methodist Church.
