= Lynching of Olli Kinkkonen =

Lynching of Finnish-American in Minnesota

Olli (Olof) Kiukkonen Kinkkonen
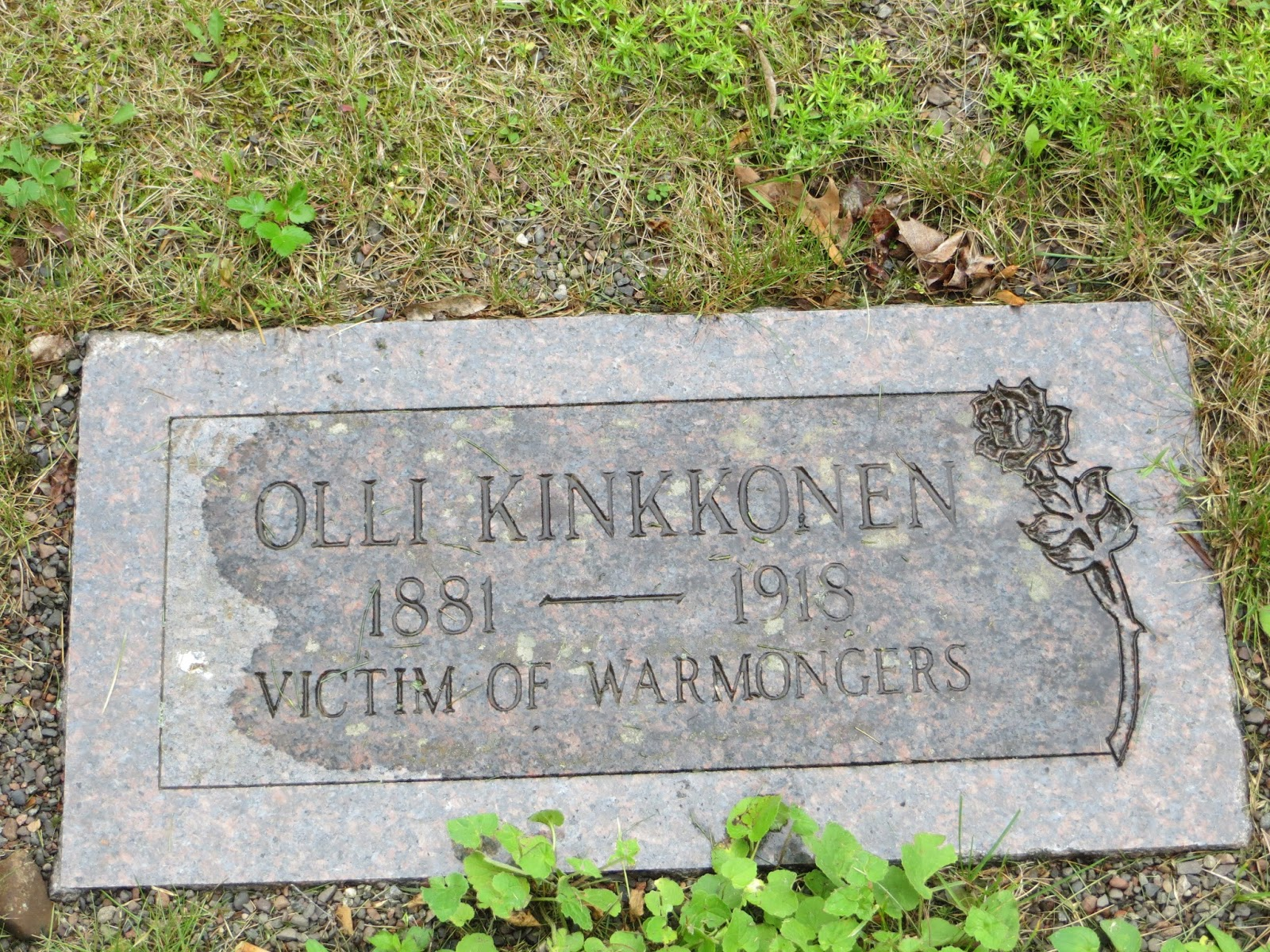
- "Olli Kinkkonen, 1881–1918, victim of warmongers."
- Born: June 10, 1880; Finland
- Died: September 18, 1918 (aged 38); Duluth, Minnesota, United States
- Cause of death: Lynching
- Body discovered: Lester Park, Duluth, Minnesota, United States
- Burial place: Park Hill Cemetery, Duluth, Minnesota, United States
- Other name: Olli Wirta

Olli (Olof) Kiukkonen Kinkkonen (June 10, 1880 – September 18, 1918) was a Finnish-American dockworker and logger. He was lynched in Duluth, Minnesota, by the Knights of Liberty on September 18, 1918, for renouncing his American citizenship because he wanted to avoid fighting in World War I.

== Death ==
On September 11, 1918, Kinkkonen (who also went by the name Olli Wirta) and five others renounced their rights to U.S. citizenship because they did not want to fight in World War I. The night of September 18, a small vigilante mob formed and went searching for him, one man dressed in a military uniform. They found him in his boarding house, preparing to return to Finland. They demanded the registration papers of the other residents and told Kinkkonen he was wanted by the draft board. He was taken to Congdon Park where he was interrogated regarding his loyalty to the country; according to those who knew him, he did not know enough English to be able to answer all the questions. Kinkkonen was then tarred and feathered. The local newspaper received an anonymous phone call at midnight stating Kinkkonen had been tarred and feathered. They later published a letter from a group called the Knights of Loyalty or Knights of Liberty, a nationalist secret society and vigilante organization (and possibly part of the Ku Klux Klan) saying that Kinkkonen had been tarred and feathered to serve as "a warning to all slackers", a term used for men who refused to join the military. The Knights sent the same list of questions and a warning to the other five men who had renounced their citizenship as well. Kinkkonen was not seen after the event.

His body was found by a nearby resident two weeks later on September 30, hanging from a tree outside Duluth in Lester Park. Several hundred dollars and war savings stamps were found on his body. Duluth authorities declared his death a suicide, triggered by his humiliation at the event. Governor Joseph Burnquist offered a $500 reward for further information, albeit the alleged murderers were never charged. The Nonpartisan League took issue with what they saw as the government's inaction, "[claiming] no real effort was made to determine whether Kiikonen [sic] was really a suicide or whether he was strung up by the mob." The Truth, a local socialist newspaper, also argued that Kinkkonen was killed by the Knights of Liberty, "[calling] the chief of police 'unfit for office' and [suggesting] that the Duluth News Tribune knew the truth behind Kinkkonen's hanging." Others in the media stated the governor should have done more to stop vigilante violence and "to check the attempt to create a northern Ku-Klux".

Kinkkonen was known to be an easygoing man and was not involved in the labor movement or anti-war movement; some have questioned whether his death was due to anti-Finnish sentiment or mistaken identity.

Kinkkonen was buried in an unmarked grave in the indigent section of Park Hill Cemetery in Duluth, a few rows from where the victims of the 1920 Duluth lynchings would later be buried. In 1993, the Finnish-American cultural society, Työmies, placed a marker on Kinkkonen's grave. It reads:

Olli Kinkkonen. 1881–1918. Victim of Warmongers.

== Knights of Liberty and related events ==
The Knights' actions were part of broader vigilante violence at the time targeting those considered potentially disloyal. They were one of many voluntary nationalist vigilante organizations, including the American Protective League and Boy Spies of America, encouraged by local, state, and federal government. At the time of Kinkkonen's death, the organization stated it had 2000 members in Duluth, 75,000 members in Minnesota, and over 2,000,000 members nationwide.

In March 1918, several months before Kinkkonen's death, The Duluth Herald reported on the Knights of Liberty's Duluth branch threatening men considered to have pro-German sympathies. The threats "disclosed the existence in Duluth of an organization called the Knights of Liberty, a branch of a nation-wide society whose purpose is to stamp out pro-Germanism by the quickest and most effective methods, without recourse to legal procedure;" "its members are almost wholly business and professional men of high standing, men who beyond the draft age and unfitted by years or physical condition to join the military forces of the nation, are determined to do their bit by suppressing disloyalty and seeing to it that the nation shall not be assailed from within." Their first victim in Duluth was tarred and feathered days later.

The Knights perpetrated a number of other similar tarring-and-feathering incidents around the same time both in nearby northern Wisconsin, and Bemidji, Minnesota, as well as in California, where they hanged a man.

== Legacy ==
A fictionalized account of Kinkkonen's life is featured in Mark Munger's book Suomalaiset: People of the Marsh. A song entitled "Ballad of Olli Kinkkonen" was performed at the release of the final book in the series. A poem about his life was published by Lynette Reini-Grandell in 2014. Artist Charvis Harrell's painting of Kinkkonen was on display at the New York Mills Regional Cultural Center in 2021.

== See also ==
- John T. Meints, German American farmer and Nonpartisan League member tarred and feathered in Minnesota in 1918
- Robert Prager, German immigrant lynched in Illinois in 1918
- Tulsa Outrage, violent 1917 incident in Oklahoma by the Knights of Liberty
- Opposition to World War I
