= Knights of Liberty (vigilante group) =

1917–1918 American vigilante group

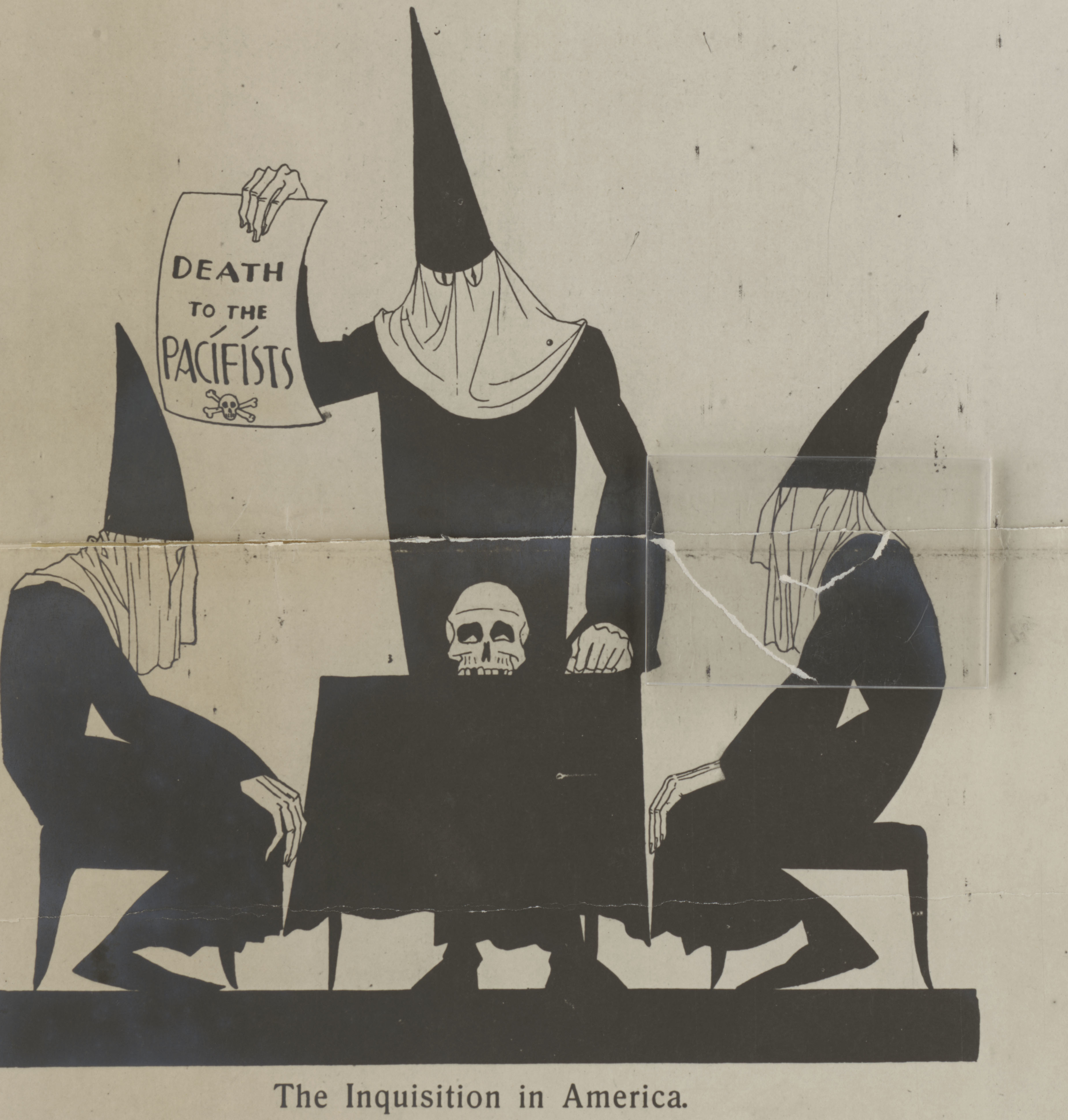
1918 German propaganda depicting an American "inquisition" against pacifists.

The Knights of Liberty (sometimes Liberty Knights, Loyalty Knights, or Knights of Loyalty) was an American volunteer nationalist secret society and vigilance committee active circa 1917–1918, claiming responsibility for violence against perceived disloyalty during World War I. They are known for the 1917 Tulsa Outrage in Oklahoma, the 1918 lynching of Olli Kinkkonen in Minnesota, and a spree of 1918 tarring and feathering events in Wisconsin and California.

== Background ==
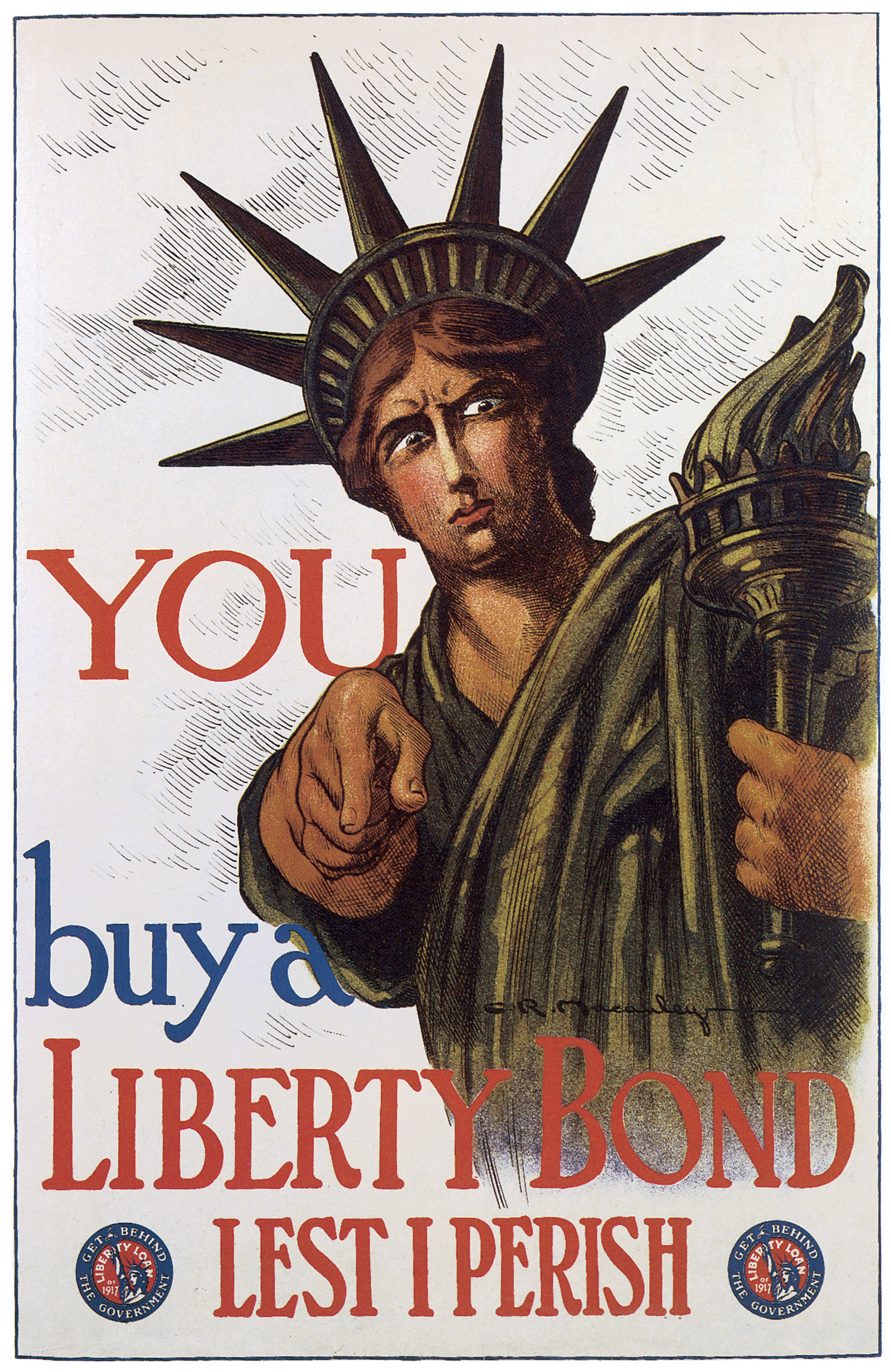
1917 poster for Liberty Bonds

On April 6, 1917, the United States declared war on the German Empire, entering into World War I. Needing additional manpower to ensure the nation's security domestically and appealing to Americans' sense of volunteerism and "vigilante tradition", President Woodrow Wilson authorized the founding of the semi-official American Protective League that year. Other similar organizations sprang up, including the Knights of Liberty, National Security League, Boy Spies of America, Sedition Slammers, American Rights League, American Defense League, and Anti-Yellow-Dog League. These organizations, encouraged by local, state, and federal government, had a goal of targeting those they considered disloyal.

The extent of the Knights of Liberty's relationship to the Ku Klux Klan (KKK) has been debated. KKK member and Tulsa community leader W. Tate Brady was identified as having led the group's initial attack on Industrial Workers of the World members in 1917. Contemporaneously described as a "modern Ku Klux Klan", "Klu Klux Clan [sic] organization", and "'Ku-Klux' of Oklahomans", it is unclear whether such terms were comparisons to the Klan's secretive and violent nature or if the organizations were actually related. Since the second Klan, which was founded in 1915, is believed by most scholars to have barely existed outside of Georgia until around 1920, the 1917 articles referring to the Knights of Liberty as an "Oklahoma Klan" are probably referring to the similar violence, robes, and secrecy of the Knights of Liberty and the Reconstruction-era Klan, rather than an actual affiliation between the Knights of Liberty and the Georgia Klan that had started 2 years earlier. Some writers have referred to the Knights of Liberty as a "suspected branch" of the Klan, while others have called the KKK a "different franchise from the Knights perhaps, but with overlapping membership and a similar propensity for showy and sadistic violence." Some scholars have linked the Knights to the KKK participation in the later 1921 Tulsa race massacre, which has in turn, been questioned by others. In 1949, a member of one KKK offshoot told the Saturday Evening Post regarding such groups, "They go under all sorts of names. Some of them—like the Knights of Liberty and the Seventy-Sixers—don't even have the word Klan in their title. But they ain't a thing but old Ku Kluxes."

Criticism of the war effort led to a number of violent incidents, including abductions, beatings, tarring and feathering cases, and lynchings in 1917 and 1918. The Knights of Liberty claimed responsibility for a number of these incidents and threats. These included actions directed at those suspected of pro-German sentiment, as well as labor activists, pacifists, and "slackers" (similar to the later term draft dodgers) around the country. The Knights of Liberty's actions were covered in a number of US newspapers as well as abroad. The organization's membership and aims were described in 1918 by one newspaper:

... its members are almost wholly business and professional men of high standing, men who beyond the draft age and unfitted by years or physical condition to join the military forces of the nation, are determined to do their bit by suppressing disloyalty and seeing to it that the nation shall not be assailed from within.

Particularly in the spring of 1918, anti-German sentiment grew significantly as Americans heard of the happenings on the Western Front. A Council of National Defense representative for the Midwest commented, "All over this part of the country men are being tarred and feathered and some are being lynched. ... These cases do not get into the newspapers nor is an effort ever made to punish the individuals concerned. In fact, as a rule, it has the complete backing of public opinion ..." Though Wilson would later denounce mob violence in July 1918, a response described as slow and "muted", actions aimed at the disloyal continued; many believed in an obligation to assist the nation through patriotic vigilance and coercion.

== Threats ==
The Knights of Liberty's threats to local residents were published in newspapers:

You have reached the end of the road. If you say one more word, even in a whisper, or lift one finger, against this country or her allies, you are a marked man. If the law cannot reach you, we can—AND WE WILL! ... While our boys are fighting for us in France you are fighting against us at home. Aided by German gold, you have been continually at work, poisoning the minds of the ignorant, seeking to hinder the raising of government funds, discouraging enlistments, obstructing the merciful work of the Red Cross, striving to spread disaffection and unrest among our loyal working people; and in countless other devious, subtle and stealthy ways carrying out the orders of your imperial master, the German kaiser. ... You have sold your soul to the Prussian devil, but perhaps you still have your common sense. If so you will take this warning in deadly earnest. If you don’t believe we mean what we say, try us, and you will find that what we applied to the traitor—was mild compared to what will happen to you.

— Duluth News Tribune, March 24, 1918

Warning! To all Pro-German sympathizers, slackers and knockers against Liberty Bonds and other War Measures: While our brave boys are falling in France and facing a hundred million Huns far over the ocean, we,

The Knights of Liberty

Of Oklahoma and Texas, feel that we would be cowards, curs and traitors to allow sneering and unpatriotic citizens to live among us without being punished. We therefore call your attention to the fact that your health and peace will best be conserved by either getting in strong and doing your full duty or looking for other localities.

WE HAVE STOOD ALL WE WILL STAND!

The incident of Monday night will be repeated as often as necessary to make our country 100 per cent patriotic. In behalf of the boys who are dying over there, we are

The Knights of Liberty

— The Altus Weekly News, March 21, 1918

== Incidents ==
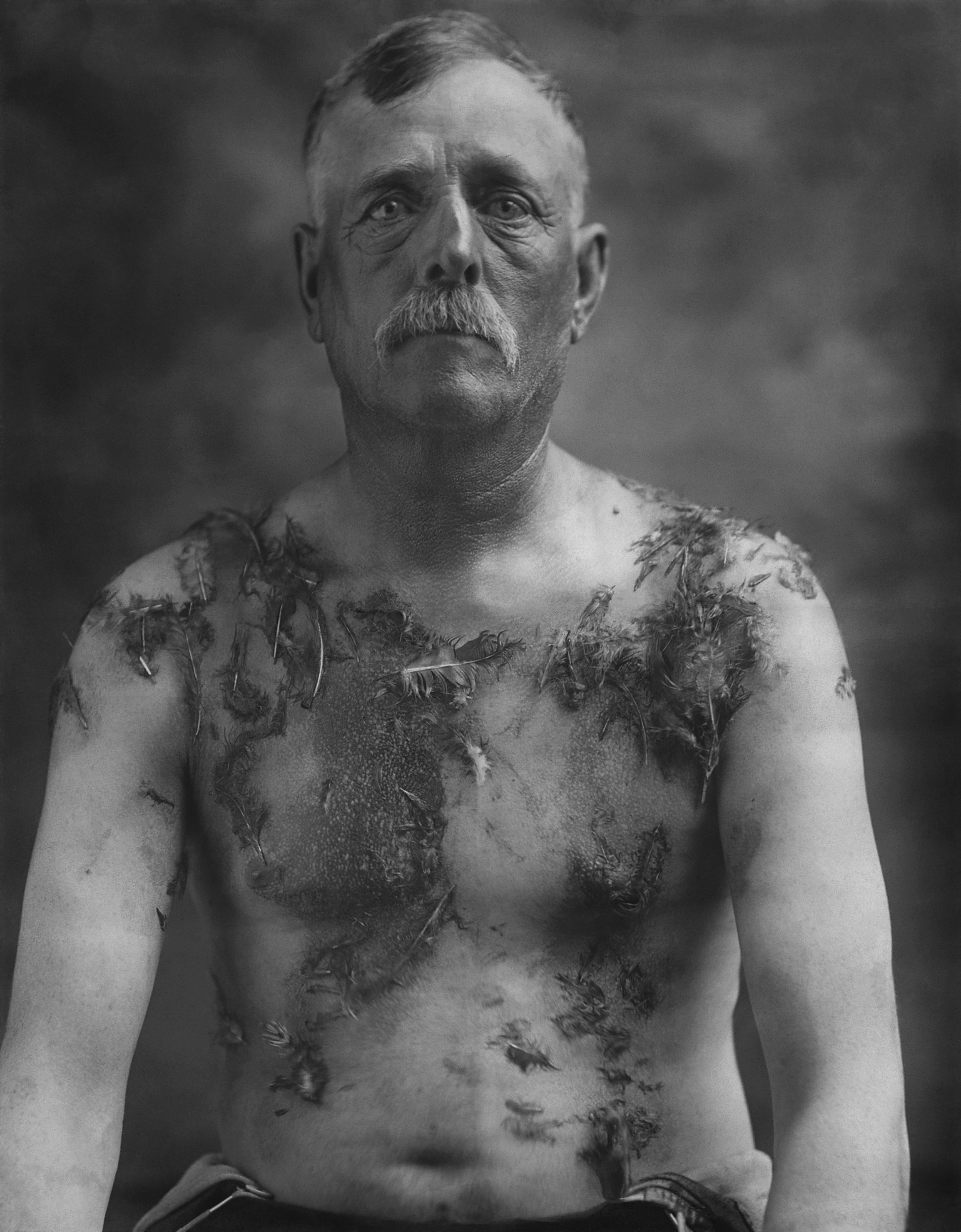
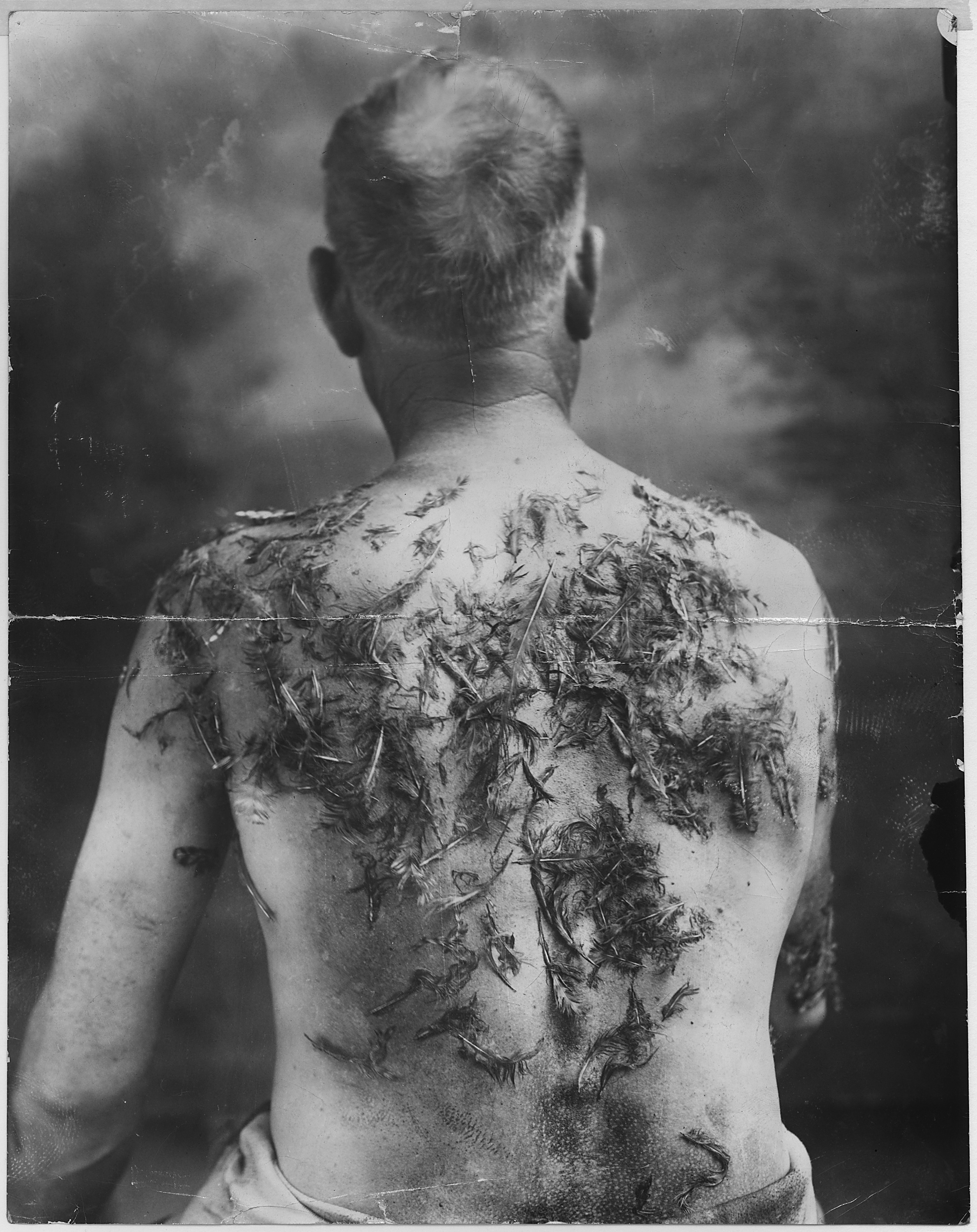
Example of a tarring and feathering victim. German-American farmer John Meints of Luverne, Minnesota, was tarred and feathered in August 1918 during World War I for allegedly not supporting war bond drives.

=== Oklahoma ===
The organization initially started in 1917 as a vigilance committee focusing on labor: one author writes, "Tulsa business men organized the 'Knights of Liberty' to serve as their shock troops." Over the course of the year, the local Tulsa Daily World had focused on the supposed German control of the Industrial Workers of the World (I.W.W.) union. On November 9, 1917, the Knights of Liberty perpetrated the Tulsa Outrage. That day, eleven I.W.W. members were convicted of vagrancy or failure to own liberty bonds. While being taken to the county jail along with six others who had been arrested, they were abducted by forty to fifty men – led by KKK member and Tulsa founder W. Tate Brady and police chief Ed Lucas – wearing black robes and masks calling themselves the Knights of Liberty. The seventeen men were taken to a deserted area where they were stripped and each bound to a tree, whipped, and tarred and feathered. Chased off with guns through barbed wire, they were turned away by local farmers "in the name of the outraged women and children of Belgium". The men returned to Tulsa to find threatening signs posted around the city signed by the "Vigilance Committee". Acting with state and local government support, prominent community members were among the mob. The local newspaper stated no effort was made to determine who the forty to fifty men were. Articles about the event were widely published throughout the country and other Knights of Liberty groups formed shortly afterwards. In 2001, the Oklahoma Commission to Study the Tulsa race massacre called the incident "an important step along the road to the race riot."

In March 1918, ten cars of masked men belonging to the Knights of Liberty kidnapped two farmers, Henry Huffman and O. F. Westbrook, in Altus, Oklahoma. The two were said to have supported German aims, not purchased liberty bonds, and "openly had cursed the government". They were stripped, whipped, tarred and feathered, and forced to kiss the American flag. They were told to leave the county. A newspaper report stated that the Knights of Liberty in southwest Oklahoma had over 500 members and that "more tarring and feathering activities are expected." Making a connection between the Knights of Liberty and the Ku Klux Klan, one newspaper headline regarding the incident read "Ku Klux Klans Are Busy", while another read "Modern Ku Klux to Chastise Slackers".

In Tulsa in April 1918, the Knights of Liberty kidnapped, stripped, whipped, and tarred and feathered John Kubecka, a German American. He was said to have made derogatory statements about the government.

In Durant, the Knights of Liberty abducted "Red" Scott, a man held in the city jail for vagrancy, in May that year. He was tied to a tree and flogged, with a threat signed by the Knights of Liberty posted above his head, stating, "This is a convict, loafer and thug. Loafers, disloyalists and crooks cannot stay in Durant. Every 'vag' not at work in twenty-four hours will be dealt with severely."

An Enid newspaper framed several June 1918 occurrences in positive, religious terms: "as a result of their evangelistic propaganda", an Austrian American farmer who had not purchased any liberty bonds was beaten and "[converted] to giving gospel" by the "accommodating Knights", while their "proselytizing" had a "wholesome", "salutory" impact on several others. In another event in Enid, a laundry wagon driver thought he had seen a portrait of the Kaiser on the wall of an old woman's home, leading him to notify the county clerk. The clerk in turn informed the Knights of Liberty, who went to her home to discover it was a portrait of Allied commander General Foch.

On September 20, 1918, the Knights of Liberty began to repeatedly threaten Julius Hüssy, the editor of Oklahoma Vorwärts, a German-language weekly newspaper. He was threatened with mob violence if he did not stop publishing the newspaper by October 4. On October 17, fifty men, some of whom were well-known community members or in public service, showed up and threatened him in person, causing him to shutter his newspaper after 18 years.

Two or three dozen black-clad and masked Knights of Liberty appeared in Tulsa in October 1918 to warn citizens to purchase liberty bonds. An October 1919 article stated the Tulsa Knights of Liberty were considering re-forming in order to fight car theft.

=== Minnesota ===
The organization announced its presence in Minnesota in March 1918, when it began sending threats signed "The Knights of Liberty, Minnesota Division" to two suspected pro-German residents. At the time they were estimated to have 500 members in Duluth. There, their first victim – Gustaf Landin, a Swedish American photographer – had previously made negative comments about the sale of liberty bonds and "governmental things in general". He was lured from home under the pretense of photographing a wedding party, then driven to a deserted area. Landin's clothes were torn off; he was whipped, tarred and feathered. He was made to kiss the American flag and his life threatened. He was told to warn the other men they had previously threatened. The group was described as being a "thoroughly organized group of men". In April, they painted a Bemidji shop-owner's store yellow, telling him he had 30 days to leave town. Later that year in September, several Duluth men including Finnish American dockworker Olli Kinkkonen renounced their citizenship to avoid fighting in World War I. The Knights of Liberty threatened the men; the letter was published in the local news. Kinkkonen was abducted from his boarding house, tarred and feathered, and lynched in a Duluth park. His body was discovered two weeks later and declared a suicide due to humiliation. Stating the act was a warning to other slackers, the Knights of Liberty took responsibility. Other local newspapers and the Nonpartisan League decried the official explanation and lack of investigation into the event. The governor offered a reward for information but no further action was taken.

In April 1919, the Knights of Liberty claimed in an Ely newspaper that they were still active around the country.

=== Wisconsin ===
At the beginning of World War I, Wisconsin – with its many German residents and first-generation German immigrants – had a lower level of support for war against the Germans, leading it to be called the "Traitor State". Organizations including the Wisconsin Loyalty Legion and Council of Defense took action to intimidate residents. The Knights of Liberty claimed responsibility for a series of tarring and feathering attacks in the Ashland area between the spring and fall of 1918, stating, "We have no purpose to do injustice to any man, but we do feel that any treasonable and seditious acts, or utterances, demand prompt punishment. These cases must not be allowed to run indefinitely, without anything being done. We want action and we want it now."

In March 1918, E. A. Schimler (sometimes spelled Schimmel), a language professor at Northland College from Germany, was suspected by the Knights of Liberty of being a German agent. They kidnapped, tarred and feathered him. He described the attack as well-organized; the Knights referred to their treatment of him as "lenient". The case was not investigated. Weeks later, suspected pro-German bartender Adolph Anton was abducted, stripped, tarred and feathered. He and his wife claimed to recognize two of the men; the cases were dismissed – a decision cheered by local spectators – and he moved to Indiana.

In May, German-born tax assessor William Landraint was not reappointed to his position after being accused of disloyalty. Abducted outside a hotel by about 50 Knights of Liberty, he had a bag placed over his head and was strangled. Landraint was then taken away, stripped, handcuffed, tarred and feathered. Though many people witnessed the event, none spoke up on the identities of the men involved. He requested police protection and later moved away to Saint Paul.

The Knights of Liberty drove a German man, Emil Kunze, out of town in June after he heard them planning to tar and feather him. He requested police protection but ended up leaving his job and moving away. The next month, Martin Johnson, a farmer, was said to have made statements against the Red Cross's work and the government. He was abducted after giving some men directions to a fishing stream. They were said to have "acted in a business-like manner" as they drove him to a secluded area where he was stripped, tarred and feathered.

In October that year, John Oestrych, a farmer, was tarred and feathered for failing to buy liberty bonds.

One scholar notes the strength of anti-German sentiment at the time leading to a lack of coverage and condemnation. Another comments that the string of events was notably not covered in the Milwaukee Journal's statewide news columns. He states it was "certainly not a coincidence" that the tarring and feathering events took place in Ashland as it was the meeting place for a number of members of the Republican Loyalty Union Party. William T. Evjue from The Capital Times placed some of the blame for the continuing violence on local newspapers' lack of condemnation; Ashland newspaper editor John C. Chapple was called "one of the ultra-reactionaries of the state".

The mayor of Ashland criticized the Knights' methods, writing in an open letter that "pro-Germanism has nothing to do with it. It is simply a question of whether law or anarchy is to prevail in Ashland" and "[t]he victim of mob outrage may or may not be a pro-German or even a German spy", urging "sincere...but...misguided patriots" to aid law enforcement against disloyalty in more appropriate ways. Governor Emanuel L. Philipp requested the public's help "to aid me in the suppression of the spirit of lawlessness which has been promoted under the guise of Loyalty"; however, local citizens were uncooperative. Upon investigating the first two attacks, state Attorney General Spencer Haven found the town's citizens "proud" and "generally satisfied". He described the Knights of Liberty as "a secret organization, presumably composed of many of Ashland's leading citizens who are absolutely loyal and determined there shall be absolutely no disloyalty in their city."

=== California ===
In May 1918, the Knights of Liberty took action in California. George Koetzer was abducted by 50 members of the Knights of Liberty and brought to a secluded location in San Jose where the men tied him to a tree and tarred and feathered him. Koetzer was chained to a cannon. The Knights of Liberty were said to have also hanged a man named Henry Steinmoltz and taken him away in a vehicle, though the Secret Service and police later described the Steinmoltz incident as a hoax. The Knights of Liberty then sent anonymous letters describing their acts to the police and federal officials. The city manager decried the Knights' vigilante methods; they called a local newspaper, warning he "had better go easy" and "The Knights of Liberty have more applications for membership than we can handle. We soon will be ready to come out in the open and then Manager Reed and everyone will be agreeably surprised at the class of men who compose its membership." No actions were taken against the police officers who allowed Koetzer to be taken. Several San Jose men requested to stay in the jail for their safety due to the threats against them by the Knights of Liberty; one was later hospitalized "in a state of nervous collapse".

One Swiss German man was tied to the tree outside the courthouse in San Rafael and another man threatened. Because the crowd sympathized with the Knights, no action was taken by the sheriff.

Later that month, a Red Cross fundraiser in San Jose featured, "dressed in their robes of mystery, robes of the Ku Klux Klan...the 'Knights of Liberty' band", playing patriotic music.

The Knights of Liberty announced further action, sending threats to dozens of San Franciscans, businessmen in Visalia, and people in Northern California. Their threats were decried by the police and the typewriter used to produce the letters was eventually found. Officials promised to stop the Knights; the Department of Justice was said by J. M. Inman to have asked them and other similar groups to disband. The San Francisco chief of police stated that the city would not tolerate the Knights of Liberty nor mob rule. Major General John F. Morrison spoke harshly against the organization, urging citizens to use legal means of addressing disloyalty: "If any American citizens are so anxious to display their loyalty, let them display it by standing loyally by the constitution of the United States... Tarring or feathering or mob violence is not in the spirit of the American constitution." The Provost Marshal Guard offered the assistance of 50 men to the police chief to combat the Knights of Liberty, and the US Marshal requested the ability to appoint more deputy marshals in 12 to 20 California cities.

== Membership ==
The Knights of Liberty were said to have 160 members in Leonardville, Kansas, a town of 380, in April 1916. In California, they claimed 82 members in the San Jose area, as well as branches in a number of other cities in the state, in May 1918. In November 1918, they claimed a membership of 75,000 in Minnesota and over 2,000,000 nationwide, significantly higher than the 250,000 to 300,000 members of the American Protective League. They claimed 800 members in Ashland, Wisconsin, in January 1919.

== Reactions ==
Local media covered the Tulsa Outrage in a generally positive tone, calling it "a party, a real American party" and referring to the Knights of Liberty as "patriotic". One Kansas City, Missouri man wrote an ode to the Knights of Liberty following the event, which was published in newspapers. The National Civil Liberties Bureau wrote in 1918 that the general response to the Tulsa Outrage was overwhelmingly positive, with a few newspapers such as the Evening Post and St. Louis Post-Dispatch condemning the event. Criticism was directed towards the Knights of Liberty for not doing enough.

After Olli Kinkkonen's death in Minnesota, the governor stated he would not tolerate mob violence and offered a $500 reward for information. The Nation argued that he should have taken stronger action to stop the Knights: "$10,000 would not have been too much to check the attempt to create a northern Ku-Klux." The "tardiness" and "spirit" of the governor's response has been described as leading one Minnesota journalist to write in an editorial, "The governor has made the discovery that there is a law against dragging a man out of his home and beating him up and subjecting him to all kinds of indignities.... Mobs have been doing – free and unmolested – so many Hun stunts in this state that we had almost come to believe that the mob was a new form of law and order enforcement."

One newspaper reacted with sarcasm:

Germany has grossly mistreated Belgium, committing revolting brutalities there. To prove this, let us put on masks, call ourselves "Knights of Liberty", capture a man with a German name and, after forcing him to kiss the flag, hang him on a tree till he is dead.

The Oil & Gas Journal in 1918 referred to the Knights of Liberty's cases of flogging and tarring-and-feathering around the country as a concept from Tulsa and mostly justified.

Writer and political activist Max Eastman called the group "cowardly masked upper-class mobs".

A more recent (1981) book calls the Knights of Liberty "some of the worst vigilante groups in the Midwest and in California".

== Media ==
The Knights of Liberty feature in All Men Fear Me, a historical fiction mystery set in Oklahoma during World War I. A similar organization called the Patriotic Knights of Liberty is part of the fiction novel Murder at Wrigley Field. A fictionalized account of Olli Kinkkonen's life, including his murder by the Knights of Liberty, is featured in the novel Suomalaiset: People of the Marsh and in a poem in Approaching the Gate: Poems.

== Other organizations with the name ==
The name Knights of Liberty was also used by several other organizations: an 1820 French anti-Bourbon association, a mid-1800s anti-slavery organization founded by Moses Dickson, an 1880s Jewish anarchist group in London, an American veterans' organization starting in 1919, and a New York anti-KKK group founded in 1923 by a former KKK member.

== See also ==
- Robert Prager
- Lynching in the United States
- 1918 Toronto anti-Greek riot
