= Lee Roy Chapman =

American historian and citizen journalist (1969–2015)

- Born: March 31, 1969; San Angelo, Texas, U.S.
- Died: October 8, 2015 (aged 46); Tulsa, Oklahoma, U.S.
- Occupations: Historian of Tulsa, Oklahoma
- Known for: Center for Public Secrets, The Nightmare of Dreamland

Lee Roy Chapman (March 31, 1969 – October 8, 2015) was an American public historian, citizen journalist, activist, and artist whose research reshaped contemporary understanding of Tulsa, Oklahoma's racial history.

== Early life ==
Chapman was born in San Angelo, Texas, to Lee Roy Chapman Jr. and Susan Lee (Smith) Chapman and moved to Tulsa when he was about four years old. Largely self-taught, he honed screen printing skills and developed a passion for locating obscure artifacts that documented Oklahoma's counter-histories.

In June 1989, when Chapman was 20, his mother died in a murder–suicide in Tulsa.

In the early 1990s, Chapman moved to Austin, Texas where he learned to screen print with artist Frank Kozik.

== Career ==
=== Investigative writing ===
Chapman began working with This Land Press and its founding editor, Michael Paul Mason in April 2010. His first project entailed the research for an issue of its namesake magazine, This Land, devoted to The White Dove Review, a poetry journal founded by Tulsa poet Ron Padgett.

As a contributing editor of This Land, Chapman published The Nightmare of Dreamland: Tate Brady and the Battle for Greenwood in 2011, revealing Tulsa founder W. Tate Brady's affiliation with the Ku Klux Klan and role in the 1921 Tulsa Race Massacre. The article prompted the Tulsa City Council's 2013 decision to rename Brady Street, as well as the Brady Arts District's decision to rebrand as the Tulsa Arts District. On the District he wrote:

Today, the Brady Arts District is the focal point of multi-million dollar developments involving local organizations such as the George Kaiser Family Foundation, the Oklahoma Museum of Music and Popular Culture, the University of Tulsa, Gilcrease Museum, Philbrook Museum, and the Arts and Humanities Council of Tulsa. Local businesses also thrive in the district: numerous bars and restaurants, the family-owned Cain's Ballroom (which once served as Brady's garage), and the Tulsa Violin Shop, to name a few. A large new ballpark separates the Brady district and the Greenwood area.

In 2013, Chapman and Mason wrote the article "Subterranean Psychonaut", about Gordon Todd Skinner, a government operative and a central figure in the world's largest LSD bust, which would be Chapman's last contribution to This Land.

=== Center for Public Secrets ===
Chapman began assembling what would later become the Center for Public Secrets (CfPS) in the late 1990s, formally launching it in 2008 as a repository for "hidden, neglected and misunderstood" Oklahoma history. CfPS curates exhibitions, podcasts and a digital library of artifacts; items Chapman located now reside in institutions such as the Smithsonian's National Museum of African American History and Culture and Yale University.

=== Other projects ===
Beyond archival work, Chapman produced documentaries and guerrilla art installations. He also appeared in public forums. Chapman was involved in the antiquarian book trade and managed Oak Tree Books in Tulsa. After his death, the bookstore closed in 2016, but it was reopened in 2024.

== Death and legacy ==
Chapman died by suicide at his Tulsa residence on October 8, 2015; he was 46. A memorial service at Cain's Ballroom drew hundreds of admirers. The Center for Public Secrets opened a physical space in 2020, continuing his mission to train "history-recovery specialists" and challenge dominant narratives about Tulsa.

He is the inspiration for the main character Lee Raybon in the FX series The Lowdown, played by Ethan Hawke.

A short documentary was created about Chapman called Lee Roy Chapman vs. The Ghost of Tate Brady.
