= Center for Public Secrets =

Building in Tulsa, Oklahoma

Center For Public Secrets
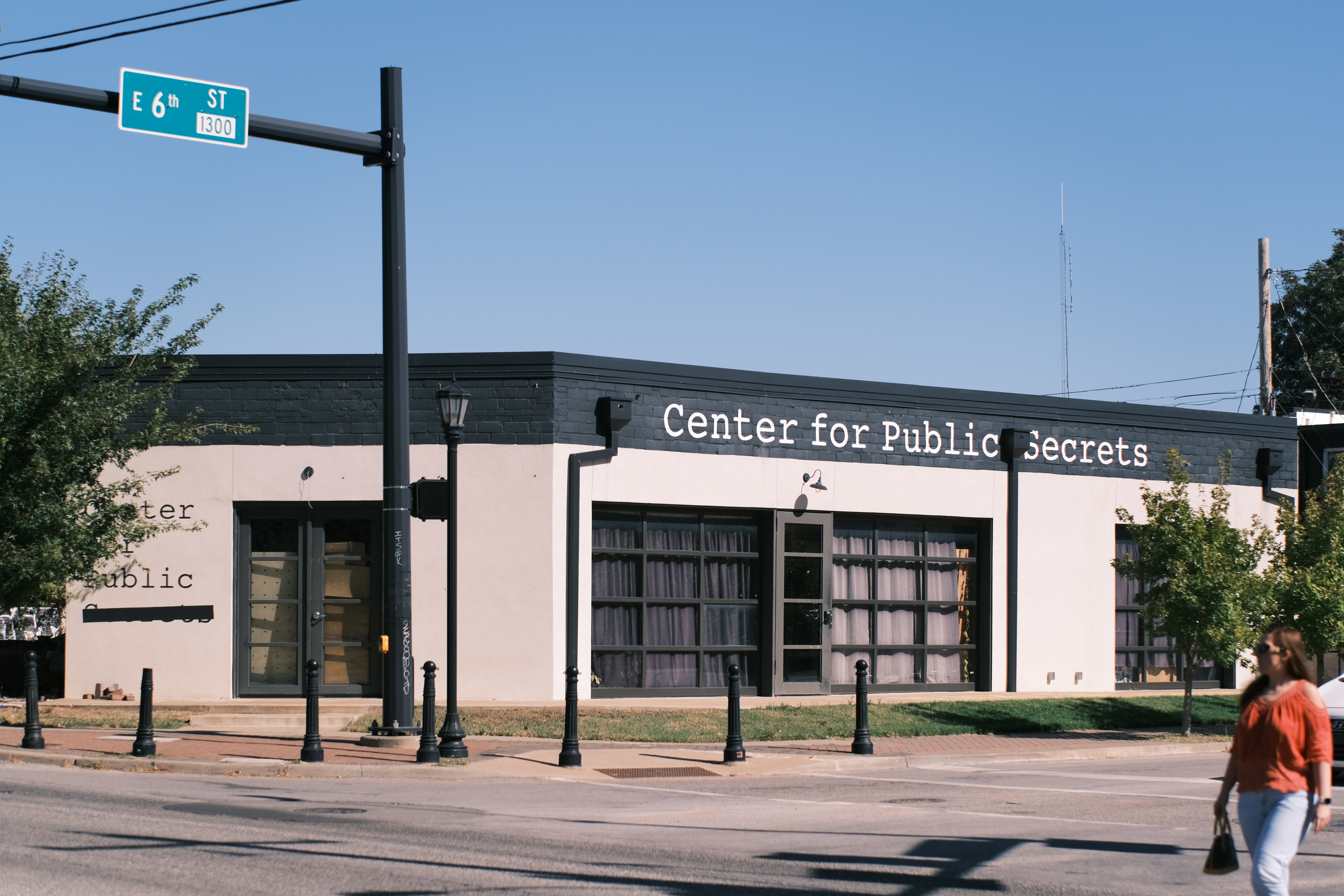
- CfPS looking Northeast

General information
- Location: 573 S Peoria Ave, Tulsa, Oklahoma, United States
- Opened: May 2020
- Owner: Whitney Chapman

Website
- https://www.centerforpublicsecrets.org

The Center For Public Secrets is a venue in Tulsa, Oklahoma dedicated to the life, writings, ideas, and site specific exhibition methods of Tulsa-born historian, journalist, and curator Lee Roy Chapman. It was founded in 2020 by his sister Whitney Chapman. The facility includes a flexible space in Tulsa's Pearl District to explore local history, culture, and emerging voices in Tulsa. A wide range of activities from performances, film screenings, exhibitions, installations, community forums and gatherings are held at the Center.

== History ==
The Center was informally founded in 2008 as Lee set out as a self-described "History Recovery Specialist" to do research, write, and present guerilla style exhibits uncovering hidden histories buried or ignored in public records for deeper public understanding. Lee's widely cited "The Nightmare in Dreamland" opened up discussions in the Tulsa community around the names and histories behind local streets, landmarks, and districts that had ties to city leaders and philanthropists involved in leadership positions of the Ku Klux Klan and who were the primary strategists behind the Tulsa race massacre. The article and many of Lee's findings brought the Tulsa race massacre, still referred to as the Tulsa Race Riot at the time, back into the public memory and has had an important role along with many Black community leaders and activists in the reframing and renaming from Riot to Massacre, as well as shaping the context, tensions, and controversies around the Tulsa Race Massacre Centennial.

Lee's series "Public Secrets", which was shot with filmmaker Sterlin Harjo, brought his candid, but intensive research style to local programming with local publication This Land Press. Lee's series, which is still streaming online, was uploaded through This Land Press in 2012 and showcased the variety of research methods and topics Lee would use to investigate the Oklahoma narrative and physical landscapes.

Today the Center is home to a variety of programs and performances, however it is also a space to access Lee's research materials, art, writings, and more while reflecting on, uncovering, and in many ways participating with Tulsa and Oklahoma's history.
