= This Land Press =

American regional magazine

'This Land'
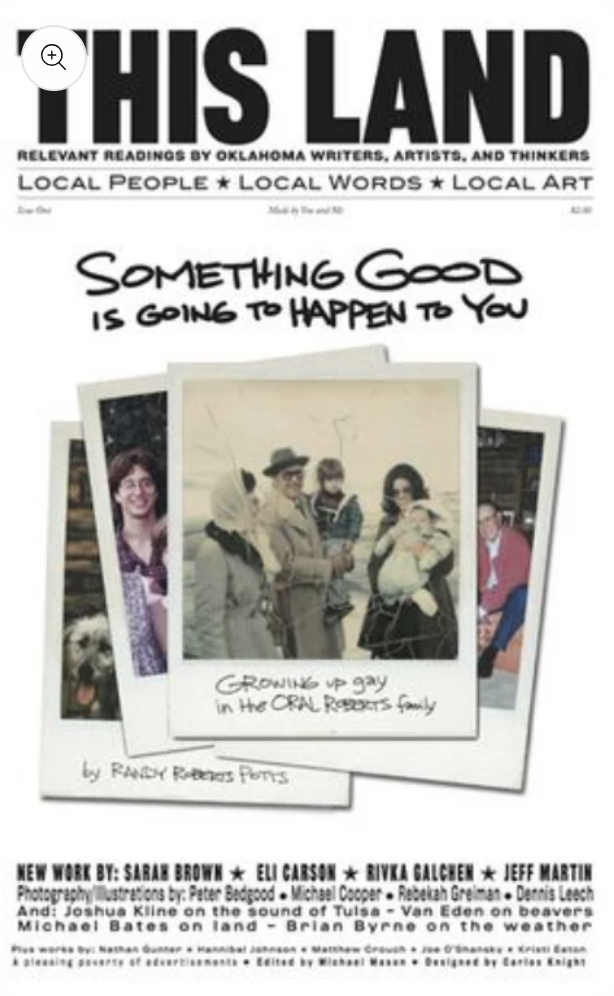
- This Land issue 1
- Editor-in-Chief: Michael Mason (2010-2017)
- Categories: Journalism
- Frequency: Bi-monthly
- Publisher: Dean Williams (2010); Vincent Lovoi (2011–present)
- Country: United States
- Based in: Tulsa, Oklahoma, U.S.
- Language: English
- Website: www.thislandpress.com

This Land Press is a media and merchandising company based in Tulsa, Oklahoma, that produced a quarterly print magazine, This Land. It was founded by Michael Mason, an Oklahoma-born author, journalist, and editor. In March 2011, Tulsa businessman Vincent LoVoi partnered with Mason and became the publisher of This Land Press. In January 2017, the company announced it would suspend production of the quarterly magazine.

== Magazine ==
This Land Press began publishing This Land, a semi-monthly broadsheet, in May 2010. This place-based publication primarily features longform, in-depth, narrative journalism focusing on life and culture in the middle of America.

The first issue of This Land magazine featured the cover story "Something Good is Going to Happen to You: Growing up Gay in the Oral Roberts Family," by Randy Roberts Potts. Five thousand copies of the magazine were distributed throughout the Tulsa area. The second issue featured the cover story "Private Manning and the Making of Wikileaks" by Denver Nicks, one of the first accounts of the early life of Chelsea Manning. Time magazine called This Land's article "the best answer to date" on the question of Manning's early life.

During 2010, This Land published four issues total. In January 2011, it began circulating on a monthly basis throughout the Tulsa area. Mark Brown joined This Land Press as the managing editor of This Land in March of the same year. With its July 2011 issue, This Land began its semi-monthly schedule. On September 1, 2011, This Land published an article called "The Nightmare of Dreamland," by Lee Roy Chapman. The article revealed that a founder of Tulsa, W. Tate Brady, was a participant in the Tulsa Outrage of 1917, a member of the Ku Klux Klan, and an architect of the Tulsa race massacre of 1921.

In April 2015, This Land magazine changed its format and frequency to that of a quarterly perfect-bound magazine.

In February 2017, the company released the Race Reader, an anthology of previously published material dealing with race relations in the middle of America.

In a letter to subscribers accompanying the Race Reader, the company announced that it would suspend publication of the magazine and instead focus on its retail and merchandise, but suggested the print publication may someday return. A Columbia Journalism Review post-mortem entitled "Celebrated heartland news outlet drops magazine, keeps T-shirts and soaps" poked gentle fun at This Land's shift from print to retail, but also celebrated the legacy and influence of the magazine.

The Faith Reader, featuring previously published material on the subject of faith, religion and spirituality, was released in the fall of 2017.

Past contributors to the print edition include Rivka Galchen, Ben Greenman, Sam Lipsyte, Nick Tosches, Ron Padgett, S. E. Hinton, Gordon Grice, Hank Stuever, Ginger Strand, and Michael Wallis, among others.

=== Reception ===
In March 2011, the Columbia Journalism Review called This Land Press "The New Yorker with balls" and "a rare example of literary journalism at the community level." The article also compared This Land Press to the Oxford American, saying that both publications "have a talent for mixing anachronistically beautiful print content with web features that are equal to (rather than derivative of) their print counterparts."

KWGS, a National Public Radio station in Tulsa, covered the launch of This Land after the publication of its third issue in November 2010. In the broadcast, host Rich Fisher compared the publication to the "Golden Age of monthly magazine publication."

In an audio report, Monocle magazine stated that "This Land suggests the kind of pioneering spirit that Woody Guthrie would likely approve."

== Video ==
This Land TV was directed and produced by Matt Leach and Sterlin Harjo. The season premiere of This Land TV began on March 7, 2011 and continued for 12 episodes which aired throughout Oklahoma on The Cox Channel. Notable guests included actor Wes Studi, musicians Wayne Coyne and Rosanne Cash, anmongst others.

In January 2014, a This Land Press produced documentary, "This May Be the Last Time", premiered at the Sundance Film Festival. Variety magazine called it "a testament to Native American oral history in its most lyrical form."

== Audio ==
This Land Press produced short audio features that aired on public radio stations throughout the U.S.
