= Caroline Lowe =

American lawyer (1874–1933)

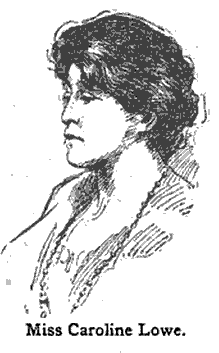
Caroline Lowe, from a 1919 publication

Caroline A. Lowe (1874–1933) was a Canadian-American labor and civil liberties lawyer and Socialist activist for the Industrial Workers of the World (IWW).

== Early life ==
On November 28, 1874, Caroline Lowe was born in Cottom, Essex County, Ontario, Canada. Lowe's family descended from British loyalists from the American Revolutionary War. Lowe's father was an itinerant lumberjack. Lowe grew up in Oskaloosa, Iowa. At age sixteen, Lowe moved to Kansas City, Missouri.

== Career ==
Lowe taught school for many years and became president of the Kansas City Teachers Association.

In 1903, she joined the two-year-old Socialist Party of America in Kansas.

As of 1908, she had become a Socialist organizer in Kansas. She worked as a Socialist field worker with miners and their families in Nebraska coal towns. She became a popular Socialist speaker.

By 1911, she had become chairwoman and general correspondent of the party's Woman's National Committee.

In 1918, she was admitted to the bar and practiced in Girard, Kansas.

In January 1918, she helped defend IWW member Charlies Krieger in Tulsa, Oklahoma. Fred Moore led the defense team, assisted by Lowe and George Bonstein of Tulsa, in Krieger's first of two trials. Krieger was charged with felony for destroying a building with explosives. The trial began in October and received coverage from as far away as Seattle.

During April to August 1918, she supported George Vanderveer in the Chicago trial of 101 "Wobblies" (IWW members), including co-founder Bill Haywood.

In 1919, the IWW sent her to New York City to help Carl Recht on deportation cases occurring in Seattle, Washington: 53 IWW aliens were being sent to Ellis Island for deportation. These deportation efforts arose from the 1919 Seattle General Strike, handled by IWW defender George Vanderveer. Recht and Lowe wrote a 200-page report on their findings, which they presented to Immigration and Labor representatives: they saved some 30 from deportation. On February 10, 1919, she gave a speech entitled "The Disillusions of Democracy" at an IWW People's Council fundraiser in New York City.

In December 1919, she co-defended 28 Wobblies in Kansas City, Kansas. In March 1918, a Wichita, Kansas grand jury had accused them of violating the Espionage Act and the Lever Act for interruption of petroleum flow. Legal flaws led to a special grand jury in June 1919, which indicted them again under the Espionage and Lever Acts. Despite the efforts of the defense team (Lowe, George Vanderveer, Fred Moore, and Otto Christensen), the jury found 26 guilty (after one of the 28 pled guilty and the last remained at large). Sentence ranges from three to nine years in prison.

== Works ==
- "A Letter from Our Attorney on the Wichita Case", One Big Union Monthly (September 1919)
- The Wage-Earning Woman and the Ballot (Chicago: Socialist Party, undated)
- The New Social Structure (Oakland: International Press, 1920)
