= Tulsa Outrage =

Act of vigilante violence

- Part of United States home front during World War I
- Location: Tulsa, Oklahoma
- Date: November 9, 1917
- Target: Industrial Workers of the World
- Attack type: Vigilante; Tar and feather
- Weapon: Guns
- Victims: 12 IWW members 5 defense witnesses
- Perpetrator: Knights of Liberty
- Assailants: W. Tate Brady and co-conspirators

The Tulsa Outrage was an act of vigilante violence perpetrated by the Knights of Liberty against members of the Industrial Workers of the World amidst World War I on November 9, 1917, in Tulsa, Oklahoma.

In April 1917, the United States entered World War I. Oklahoma Governor Robert L. Williams extralegally created the State Council of Defense and local county councils to help administer the state during the war. County councils, staffed by local elites, frequently targeted their local enemies, including union organizers.

On November 5, 1917, the Tulsa Police Department raided the local IWW headquarters and arrested 11 men. After a trial November 8, the men were loaded into vehicles, taken to the edge of town, and tar and feathered by a group of men affiliated with the Knights of Liberty that include W. Tate Brady. Local media praised the incident, while it was largely denounced by national media.

== Background ==
Prior to World War I, the Industrial Workers of the World (IWW) saw some success in unionizing oil workers in Oklahoma. In April 1917 the United States entered World War I while the Oklahoma Legislature was out of session. Governor Robert L. Williams used the war as justification for the creation of the State Council of Defense and local county councils of defense to oversee the state during the war. Williams personally appointed members to these councils. Since the councils in Oklahoma were created without the approval of the state Legislature, they lacked legal authority and were extralegal. The Councils of Defense relied on public opinion in order to maintain legitimacy. In practice, this meant the councils frequently targeted local enemies with violence and intimidation.

The Tulsa County Council of Defense (TCCD), the state's most aggressive and powerful county council, was formed July 11, 1917. Its inaugural members were J. Burr Gibbons, Robert M. McFarlin, Glenn Condon, H. C. "Harry" Tyrrell, and Lilah Denton Lindsey. Condon was named managing editor of the Tulsa Daily World months earlier in March 1917 and began publishing "increasingly bloody-minded editorials" against the Industrial Workers of the World. On August 2, 1917, the Green Corn Rebellion uprising led to an increase in anti-socialist and anti-union sentiment in the state.

=== J. Edgar Pew home bombing ===
J. Edgar Pew was a wealthy Tulsa oilman who had worked for the Standard Oil Company. On October 29, 1917, his home was damaged by a bombing which destroyed the porch and damaged windows. The Tulsa World blamed the attack on the Industrial Workers of the World. Investigators initially detained W. J. Powers for the bombing, but he was cleared by November. Charles Krieger, a member of the IWW, was later detained for the bombing. Krieger's defense was supported by the Workers Defense Union and Elizabeth Gurley Flynn organized his defense team which included Fred Moore, Eugene Lyons, and Caroline Lowe. Local oilman Charles Page, who frequently feuded with members of the Tulsa Home Guard, also supported Krieger by deploying armed guards to the courthouse to prevent his lynching, according to Lyons. After a mistrial, Kreiger was acquitted in 1920.

After the explosion at Pew's home, the TCCD announced the creation of a 150-man Home Guard. The TCCD would later call the Home Guard its "right arm of power". The Home Guard attracted influential members including Eugene Lorton and W. Tate Brady. Carter Oil Company, the oil company Pew worked for at the time, and the Tulsa Police Department blamed the IWW for the bombing based on testimony from private investigators hired by Carter Oil Company. The Tulsa Daily World publicly blamed the union for planning a "reign of terror" in the state. Federal investigators who had infiltrated the Tulsa IWW found they were "doing nothing or planning nothing directed against the Government" and that there was "no talk of violence."

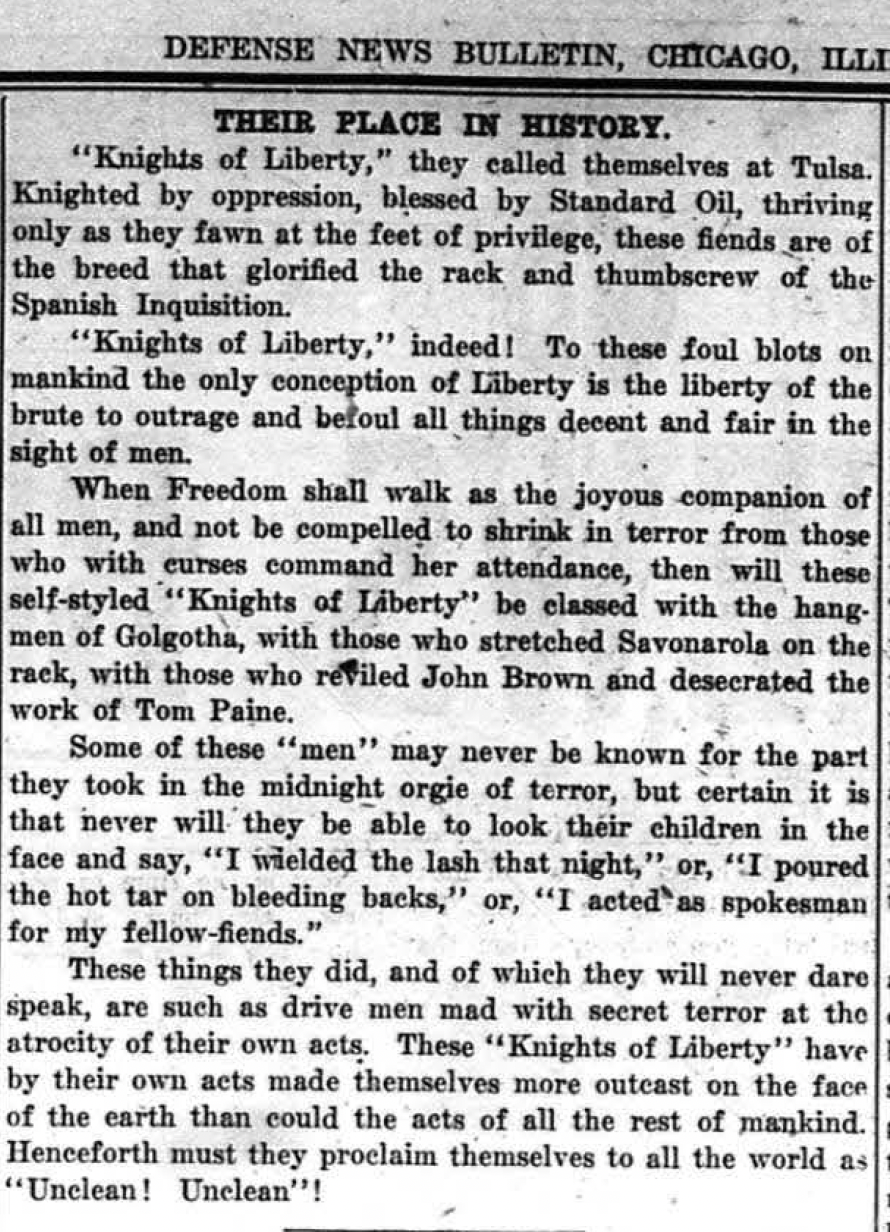

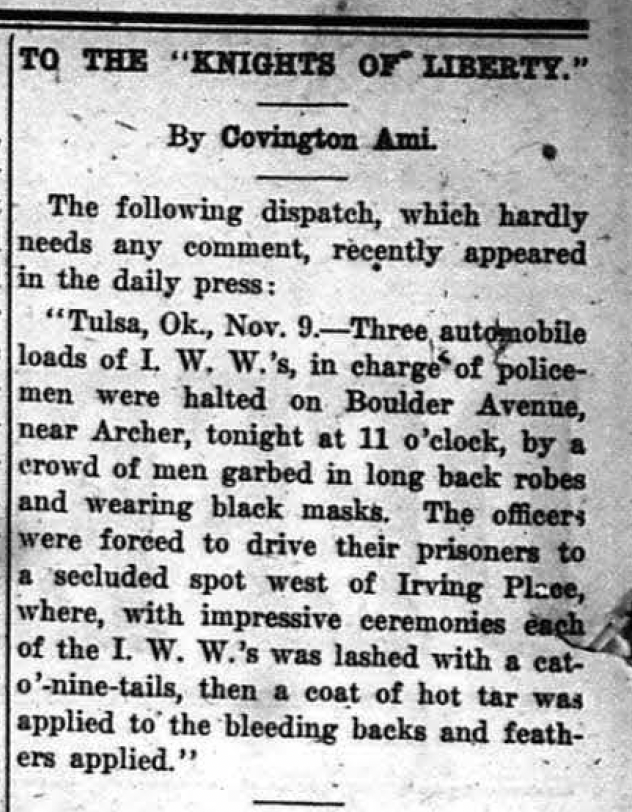

After the bombing, the Tulsa Daily World escalated its rhetoric, writing that the solution was "a wholesale application of concentration camps. Or, what is hemp worth now, the long foot?" On November 5, the Tulsa Police Department raided the IWW headquarters in Tulsa, arresting 11 men for vagrancy. On November 6, Home Guard member W. Tate Brady assaulted E. L. Fox, the owner of the building the Tulsa IWW rented for their headquarters. By November 7, federal agents had heard rumors of a plan "by which the men are to be given a hearing tomorrow evening, remanded to jail, and later some businessmen are to escort the men to the City limits and make them leave, with a warning not to return."

== Trial ==
The trial began in front of Judge T. D. Evans on November 8 with the prosecutor largely ignoring the charge of vagrancy and instead asking the defendants about their loyalty to the government and support for Liberty Loans. The IWW members were represented by Chas. A. Richards. On Friday, November 9, the Tulsa Daily World published an editorial entitled "Get Out the Hemp" which wrote:

Any man who attempts to stop the [oil] supply for one-hundredth part of a second is a traitor and ought to be shot!... If the I.W.W. or its twin brother, the Oil Workers union, gets busy in your neighborhood, kindly take occasion to decrease the supply of hemp. Knowledge of how to tie a knot that will stick might come in handy in a few days...kill'em just as you would kill any other kind of snake. Don't scotch 'em; kill'em. And kill'em dead. It is no time to waste money on trials and continuances and things like that.

At the conclusion of the trial the 11 arrested IWW members were convicted of either vagrancy or failure to own a Liberty Bond (the second of which was not a crime). Frank Ryan, another IWW member who had testified at trial, was also arrested at the end of trial along with other suspected IWW members in attendance. After sentencing, the police had arrested a total of 17 men. Some sources indicate that each individual was charged a $100 fine, while others question whether the fine was enforced or legitimate.

== Incident ==
Shortly after midnight, the men were loaded into three police cars by three officers and six other men. It was reported that police beat the IWW members before delivering them to the Knights of Liberty. Shortly after leaving, the convoy was seized by the Knights of Liberty. The Knights of Liberty abducted the men at gunpoint and drove them to a deserted location west of town. The men were then, one by one, bound to a tree, whipped, then tarred and feathered.

"After each one was whipped another man applied the tar with a large brush, from the head to the seat," wrote the Tulsa branch secretary. "Then a brute smeared feathers over and rubbed them in ... After they had satisfied themselves that our bodies were well abused, our clothing was thrown into a pile, gasoline poured on it, and a match applied. By the light of our earthly possessions, we were ordered to leave Tulsa, and leave running and never come back."

Tulsa Daily World editor and Tulsa County Council of Defense member Glenn Condon witnessed, reported on, and may have participated in the attack.

=== Perpetrators ===
The Knights of Liberty was a short-lived organization. Known members in Tulsa were suspected to include former Tulsa Police Chief Ed Lucas, other Tulsa Police officers such as George Blaine and H. H. Townsend, City Attorney John Meserve, and W. Tate Brady. Other Knights of Liberty groups sprung up around the country shortly afterwards.

== Aftermath ==
=== National reaction ===
Deputy US Marshal John Moran denounced the attack, saying, "I am opposed to that kind of business and I tried to get them not to do it. You would be surprised at the prominent men in town who were in this mob."

Some national media responded with criticism of the attack including the New York Evening Post, Louisville Post-Dispatch, Minneapolis News and St. Louis Post-Dispatch.

=== Local reaction ===
After the attack, the Tulsa Home Guard denied involvement in the attack, but would not say none of its members participated.

Two victims who did not leave the city were rearrested four and six weeks later. One left the city with his wife after his arrest. The other was reportedly arrested again later after not leaving the city.

The prosecuting attorney, Tulsa City Attorney John Meserve, would later join the TCCD in December 1917 as their "prosecuting attorney".

==== Media reaction ====
The Tulsa Daily World approved and encouraged the incident. The Tulsa Democrat ran the headline "General Approval Is Given."

Harlows Weekly, another Oklahoma newspaper, justified the anti-German sentiment behind the attacks by referencing the ongoing war effort.

=== Knights of Liberty ===
The Knights of Liberty would go on to be involved in two other attacks in the city before fading away. On October 11, 1918, the group marched in uniform through Tulsa as a "Liberty Loan slackerism warning". The group would disband shortly after when member S. L. Miller shot and killed a Tulsa waiter for "disloyal statements" and three weeks later organized the beating of an alleged adulterer.
