= Brady Hotel (Tulsa) =

- Location within Oklahoma

General information
- Status: Demolished
- Location: Tulsa, Oklahoma
- Coordinates: 36.1573°N 95.9931°W
- Construction started: 1903
- Completed: 1910
- Destroyed: 1935
- Demolished: 1975
- Owner: W. Tate Brady

Technical details
- Structural system: Reinforced concrete and brick

The original Brady Hotel, a three-story wood-frame building, was built in 1903 at Archer and North Main in Tulsa, Oklahoma by W. Tate Brady. It was the first hotel in Tulsa with baths, conveniently located to the Frisco railroad depot, and very popular among the oil men attracted by the new oil discoveries at Glen Pool. This was also the meeting place where Charles N. Haskell announced his candidacy to become the first governor of the new state of Oklahoma. It also served as a meeting place for Democrats, who laid the groundwork to control the Constitutional Convention and maintain segregation.

The main competition for the Brady Hotel before statehood was the Robinson Hotel, located a short distance south on Main Street. According to a later article in the Tulsa World, the two were rivals, calling themselves, "The best hotel in Indian Territory." When the Robinson added a fourth floor, the Brady added a third floor plus an elevator. When the Robinson added a fifth floor, the Brady added not only a fourth floor, and an eight-story annex.

== Fire ==
By 1910, Brady had added a high-rise annex, connected to the original hotel by a wooden passageway. The annex, advertised as fireproof, was constructed of steel and concrete. Unfortunately, a fire that broke out in the original building on January 23, 1935, also burned through the passageway and ignited the furnishings of the annex, which were not fireproof.

== Demolition ==
After the fire had been extinguished, nothing was left except the gutted annex. No attempt was made to rebuild the hotel. By that time, its location was no longer advantageous. The center of Tulsa's business district had already moved farther south, away from Union Depot, and businessmen increasingly traveled more by air than by railroad. Other hotels (e.g., Mayo, Adams, Tulsa) had been built that catered to the needs of these travelers and were more conveniently located. According to the Tulsa World, Goodwill Industries bought the Brady building in 1943 and used it for some operations for 30 years. The derelict structure remained until it was demolished in 1975 as part of the Tulsa Urban Renewal project. It had stood more years (40) as a wreck than it had as a useful building.
