= Webster Thayer =

American judge

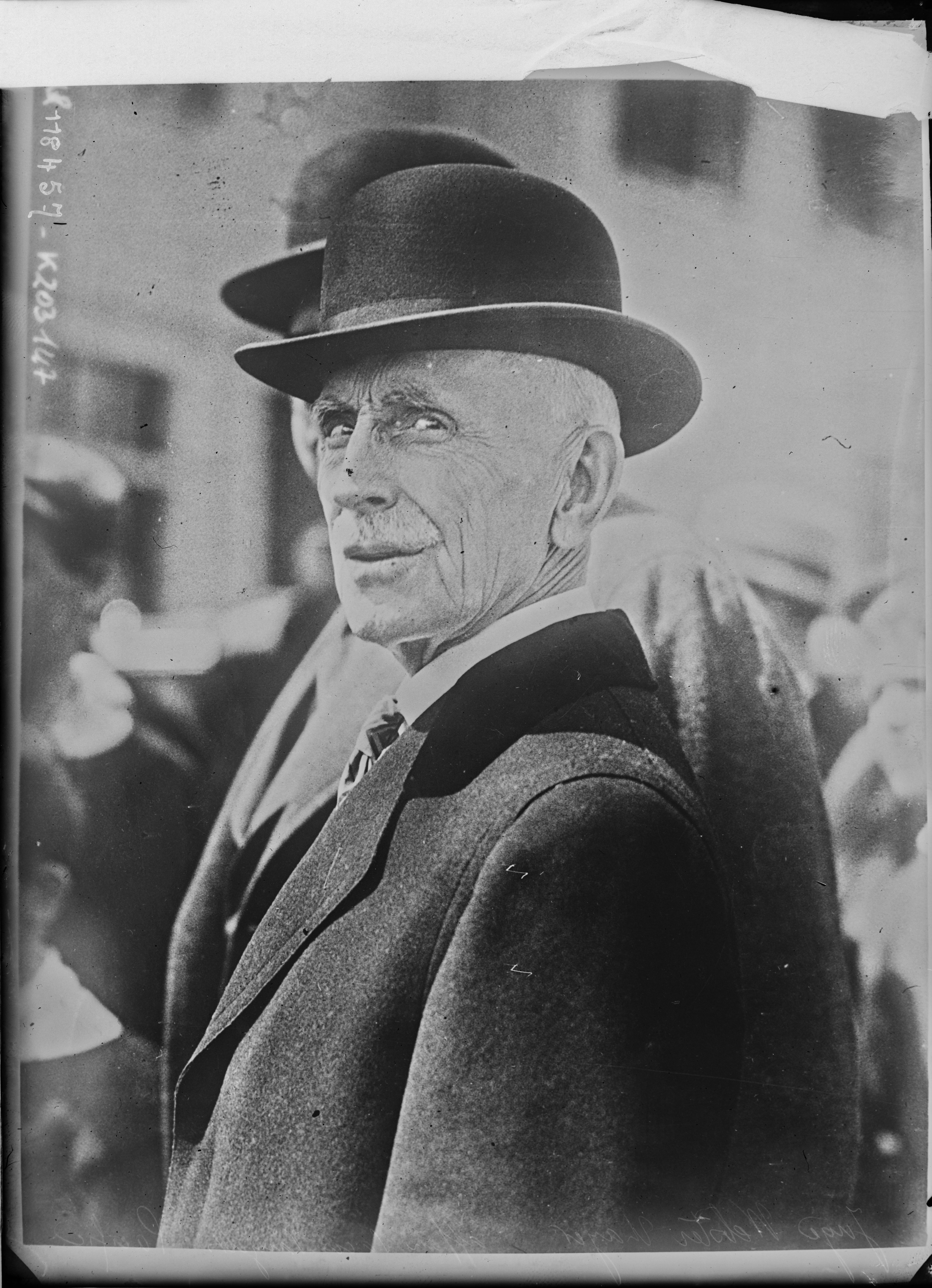
Judge Webster Thayer in April 1927

Webster Thayer (July 7, 1857 – April 18, 1933) was a judge of the Superior Court of Massachusetts, best known as the trial judge in the Sacco and Vanzetti case.

== Background ==
Thayer was born in Blackstone, Massachusetts, on July 7, 1857. He attended Worcester Academy and graduated from Dartmouth College in 1880 where he captained the baseball and football teams. He learned law through an apprenticeship rather than by attending law school and was admitted to the bar in 1882. He enjoyed a modest career in local politics, first as a Democrat and later as a Republican. He was appointed a judge of the Superior Court of Massachusetts in Dedham in 1917.

In 1920, Thayer gave a speech to new American citizens decrying Bolshevism and anarchism's threat to American institutions. He supported the suppression of radical speech and rebuked a jury that failed to return a conviction because they believed that an overt act was required rather than speech alone.

== Sacco and Vanzetti trials ==
In the same year, two Italian immigrants, Nicola Sacco and Bartolomeo Vanzetti, were arrested and charged with robbery and murder for the killing of a factory paymaster and his guard in South Braintree, Massachusetts. Both Sacco and Vanzetti were Galleanists, adherents of Luigi Galleani and his particular brand of violent anarchism. A friend of Sacco and Vanzetti, Mario Buda, is believed to have been responsible for the Wall Street Bombing on September 16, 1920, in which 38 people were killed in response to the indictment of the two men. Thayer presided at the jury trial of Sacco and Vanzetti, at the end of which both men were found guilty and sentenced to death. Thayer denied all post-trial motions for a new trial, an act for which he was condemned by various left-wing and civil liberties groups and prominent legal scholars, including Felix Frankfurter.

Thayer's behavior both on and off the bench during the trial drew criticism. A Boston Globe reporter, Frank Sibley, who had covered the trial, wrote a letter of protest to the Massachusetts attorney general condemning Thayer's bias. Others noted the frequency with which Thayer denied defense motions and the way he addressed defense attorney Fred H. Moore. Thayer defended his rulings to reporters saying, "No long-haired anarchist from California can run this court!" According to onlookers who later swore affidavits, in private discussion Thayer called Sacco and Vanzetti "Bolsheviki!" and said he would "get them good and proper". In 1924, referring to his denial of motions for a new trial, Thayer confronted a Massachusetts lawyer: "Did you see what I did with those anarchistic bastards the other day?" the judge said. "I guess that will hold them for a while! Let them go and see now what they can get out of the Supreme Court!" The outburst remained a secret until 1927 when its release fueled the arguments of Sacco and Vanzetti's defenders. The New York World attacked Thayer as "an agitated little man looking for publicity and utterly impervious to the ethical standards one has the right to expect of a man presiding in a capital case."

In 1927, as the scheduled executions approached, Massachusetts governor Alvan T. Fuller appointed a three-man panel to advise him as he considered clemency. It consisted of the popular novelist and Probate Judge Robert Grant, Harvard University President Abbott Lowell, and MIT President Samuel Wesley Stratton. While they determined that the trial had been fair and a new trial was not warranted, they assessed the charges against Thayer as well. They found some of the charges about his statements unbelievable or exaggerated, and they determined that anything he might have said had no impact on the trial. The panel's reading of the trial transcript convinced them that Thayer "tried to be scrupulously fair." Jurors in the Sacco-Vanzetti trial, the panel noted, were almost unanimous in praising Thayer for his conduct of the trial. Still the panel criticized him, using words provided by Judge Grant: "He ought not to have talked about the case off the bench, and doing so was a grave breach of judicial decorum."

Sacco and Vanzetti both denounced Thayer. Vanzetti wrote, "I will try to see Thayer death (sic) before his pronunciation of our sentence" and asked fellow anarchists for "revenge, revenge in our names and the names of our living and dead."

== Afterwards ==
Fellow Galleanists retaliated violently over the next several years in revenge, placing bombs at the residences of trial participants, including a juror who had served in the Dedham trial, a prosecution witness, the official executioner, Robert G. Elliott, and Judge Thayer. On September 27, 1932, a dynamite-filled package bomb destroyed Thayer's home in Worcester, Massachusetts. Thayer was unhurt, but his wife and a housekeeper were both injured.

Thayer lived for the remainder of his life at his club in Boston, guarded around the clock by his personal bodyguard and police sentries. He died of a cerebral embolism at the University Club in Boston on April 18, 1933, at the age of 75. Italian anarchist Valerio Isca commented that Sacco and Vanzetti had received some measure of revenge because Thayer died while sitting on the toilet seat "and his soul went down the drain."
