= The Heights, Tulsa =

- Brady Heights Historic District
- U.S. National Register of Historic Places
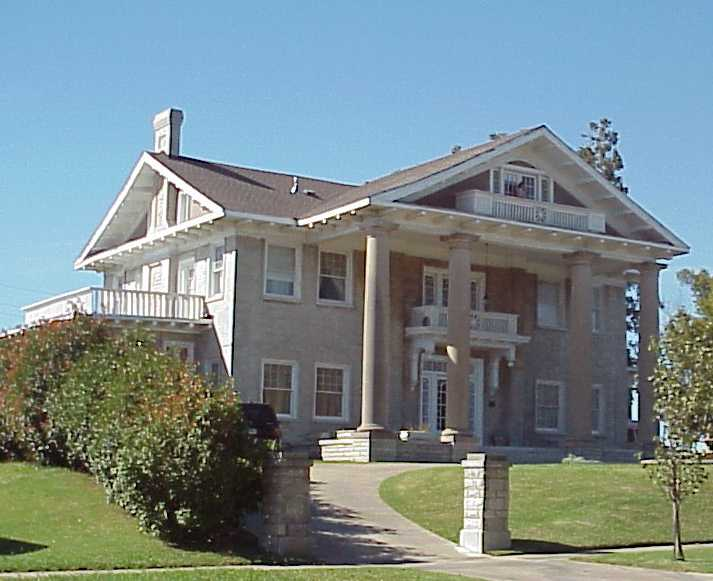
- The Brady Mansion on North Denver Avenue
- Location: Tulsa, OK
- Coordinates: 36°10′04″N 95°59′57″W
- Area: 72 acres (29 ha)
- Architect: Multiple
- Architectural style: Classical Revival, Prairie School, Bungalow/Craftsman
- NRHP reference No.: 80003302

Significant dates
- Dates of significance: 1907-1925
- Added to NRHP: June 27, 1980

The Heights in Tulsa, Oklahoma, also commonly referred to as Brady Heights, is a neighborhood and historic district that was listed on the U.S. National Register of Historic Places in 1980, as Brady Heights Historic District. It was Tulsa's first district to be listed in the Register. According to the NRHP documentation, it is the most complete pre-1920 neighborhood surviving in Tulsa. Its boundaries are Marshall Street to the north, the alley between Cheyenne Avenue and Main Street on the east, Fairview Street on the south, and the Osage Expressway right-of-way on the west. At listing, it included 250 contributing buildings.

From territorial days until the 1920s, The Heights was an important part of the then-fashionable North Side of Tulsa. Professionals and businessmen like G. Y. Vandever (owner of Vandever's department store), I. S. Mincks (initial owner of the Mincks-Adams Hotel), architect George Winkler, and “Diamond Joe” Wilson, owned homes there.

The area derived its original name from entrepreneur and politician W. Tate Brady, who owned the land now making up the neighborhood. As of 2021, the area's name omits mention of Brady due to his affiliation with the Ku Klux Klan.

Many architectural styles have influenced the design of The Heights. Architects and builders used elements of Queen Anne, Prairie School, Victorian, Georgian Revival, and Bungalow styles. Wood and brick are the most common exterior materials. The houses of The Heights are on a larger scale and of a more sophisticated design than those of adjacent neighborhoods. Bay windows with leaded glass, servants’ quarters, and broad porches suggest the elegance of earlier days.

The development differs from later Tulsa neighborhoods in that it is more eclectic. The district also includes two Dutch Colonial houses and a 1920 neoclassic mansion.

It was listed under National Register Criteria C, for its architecture.
