= Robert Prager =

German immigrant lynched in the US

- Born: February 28, 1888; Dresden, Germany
- Died: April 5, 1918 (aged 30); Collinsville, Illinois, United States
- Burial place: St. Louis, Missouri; 38.5764703°N 90.2711041°W
- Occupation: Miner
- Known for: German national lynched in the United States during World War I

Robert Paul Prager (February 28, 1888 – April 5, 1918) was a German immigrant who was lynched in the United States during World War I due to growing anti-German sentiment. Prager initially worked as a baker in southern Illinois before taking up work as a laborer in a coal mine. He eventually settled in Collinsville, a hub for mining activity.

During a period of heightened anti-German hostility, Prager applied for membership in the Maryville, Illinois, local chapter of the United Mine Workers of America but was rejected. Following this rejection, he angered local miners by posting copies of a letter around town in which he criticized the union's local president and expressed his dissatisfaction with the decision.

A mob of 200 to 300 men forced Prager from his home in Collinsville, making him walk barefoot and wrapped in an American flag along Main Street, where he was beaten and harassed. Although the police initially took him into custody, the mob regained control, seizing him from Collinsville City Hall and accusing Mayor John H. Siegel of being pro-German. Unable to find tar to carry out a tarring and feathering, as had been done to other victims, the mob's leaders instead used a rope to hang Prager to death at a prominent bluff outside the town.

Eleven men were tried for Prager's murder, but all were acquitted. Rumors circulated that Prager held socialist beliefs, which were viewed with suspicion at the time. Members of the mob alleged that he was planning to blow up the coal mine, but no evidence supported these claims, and Prager had not been charged with any crime.

== Biography ==
Robert Paul Prager was born on February 28, 1888, in Dresden, Germany. He emigrated to the United States in 1905 at the age of 17. Initially working as an itinerant baker, he was sentenced to a year in an Indiana reformatory for theft. By the time the United States declared war on Germany on April 6, 1917, Prager was living in St. Louis, Missouri.

Prager demonstrated strong patriotism for his adopted country. The day after President Wilson's war speech on April 2, he filed his first citizenship papers to begin the naturalization process. He registered for the draft and attempted to enlist in the U.S. Navy, as aliens were promised citizenship upon successful military service. Prager also displayed an American flag from his window at all times. When his St. Louis landlord objected to the display, Prager reported him to the police.

Prager was rejected by the Navy for medical reasons. After briefly living in various towns in Missouri and Illinois, he settled in Collinsville, southern Illinois, in the late summer of 1917. He initially worked as a baker for an Italian named Lorenzo Bruno. In early 1918, attracted by the high wartime wages miners were earning, Prager began working as a laborer at the Donk Brothers Coal and Coke Company Mine #2 in nearby Maryville. However, he was denied permanent membership in the United Mine Workers of America Local 1802, possibly due to his argumentative personality or suspected socialist beliefs.

== Background ==
=== Labor issues in Collinsville ===
In 1918, coal mining was the economic backbone of Collinsville, with seven mines operating in and around the city. Over half of the city's male working population was employed in the mines. The industry also attracted itinerant miners, many of whom lacked familial ties to the community. A significant portion of the miners were immigrants or had at least one immigrant parent, with most originating from European countries.

The United Mine Workers of America (UMW) had five local chapters in the Collinsville area, and miners held a dominant influence in the community. However, radical elements within the UMW unions led to a series of wildcat strikes at Collinsville-area coal mines during the summer and fall of 1917.

Almost simultaneously with the wildcat strikes, a unionization strike at the St. Louis Lead Smelting and Refining Plant (Lead Works) in Collinsville galvanized many coal miners and other union members in the community. The strike occasionally turned violent.

In an unusual development, Collinsville police officers and Madison County Sheriff's deputies—many of whom were former miners—sided with the striking workers from the Lead Works, as well as the coal miners supporting unionization. Industry owners responded by hiring strikebreakers, who faced harassment from both union members and law enforcement officers, often on local streets and in streetcars.

The strike at the Lead Works created social tensions similar to those that had preceded the East St. Louis Race Riots earlier in 1917. In that community, owners had hired Black workers to break strikes, fueling racial and labor unrest. In Collinsville, ethnic white workers opposed the use of "imported" labor, and many of the non-union workers hired at the Lead Works were Black, further exacerbating tensions.

The wildcat coal mine strikes and the unionization strike at the St. Louis Smelting and Refining Plant led to the radicalization of many Collinsville coal miners. They felt emboldened by the lack of resistance from community leaders and local law enforcement to their actions during 1917–1918.

=== Wartime patriotism and paranoia ===
The federal Committee on Public Information (CPI) aimed to garner support for U.S. entry into the Great War, which had been raging in Europe since 1914. Many Americans held a largely isolationist viewpoint and believed the U.S. should not get involved in Europe's problems. At the same time, anarchists and socialists largely opposed U.S. entry into the war, focusing instead on addressing domestic issues such as labor injustices and economic inequities.

The CPI's campaign reached the newspapers and produced buttons and posters to support the war effort, aiming to raise patriotic support. Additionally, the CPI controlled the release of news and photographs of the war to newspapers and magazines.

Meanwhile, Congress passed the Espionage Act of 1917, which criminalized actions that could interfere with the military or military recruitment, such as making statements that might discourage potential soldiers from registering for the draft or enlisting. The Espionage Act also prohibited the mailing of materials that could harm the government's war efforts. The government used this act broadly to suppress anarchist and socialist activists, whom it opposed. There had been considerable labor and social unrest prior to the U.S. entry into the war.

Locally, many residents of Collinsville attended patriotic events, such as National Draft Registration Day on June 5, 1917, and the organizing meeting of the Collinsville Neighborhood Committee of the Illinois State Council of Defense on March 27, 1918. Many immigrants and their descendants were eager to prove their loyalty to the United States. A number of Collinsville men enlisted, while many more were drafted to report for military service starting in September 1917. However, the city's residents failed to meet Liberty Bond sales quotas for both bond drives in 1917. In November 1917, Leighton Evatt died from pneumonia in France, becoming the first war fatality from Collinsville.

Nearly every club or organization in Collinsville conducted regular fundraising to support the soldiers or the military effort. The Red Cross became the leading war support organization locally, with nearly 4,000 members by the end of the war. Although some residents complained about fuel and food conservation measures, most people in Collinsville complied with the guidelines, not wanting their loyalty to be considered suspect.

Government propaganda urged residents to be constantly on alert for enemy spies. The war heightened the unease of native-born Americans about the growing immigrant population in the country. On December 29, 1917, the Collinsville Advertiser reported, "Every German or Austrian in the United States, unless known by years of association to be absolutely loyal, should be treated as a potential spy."

Because Germany was opposed to Great Britain and France, ethnic Germans in the United States—who had previously been among the most respected immigrant groups—faced increasing anti-German sentiment. Examples of this sentiment included the changing of street names and the discontinuation of German-language classes in many communities. Groups such as the All-Allied Anti-German League and the Boy Spies of America reported any activities they deemed suspicious.

In the coalfields of southern Illinois, miners administered extralegal justice against both real and perceived enemies. In a form of charivari, they tarred and feathered some men and drove others out of town through mob harassment. A Lutheran minister from a Collinsville-area church was forced to leave the community because he reportedly refused to renounce his German citizenship. Nationwide, harassment of German immigrants and those of German descent peaked in early 1918.

== Lynching of Robert Paul Prager ==
Prager's application to join UMW Local 1802 was rejected on April 3, 1918. After the union meeting that evening, miners paraded him near saloons in Maryville and then warned him to leave town. Prager was angered by his rejection from Local 1802 and the loss of his job. The following morning, he wrote a letter to the Maryville miners, complaining that he had been treated unfairly by Local 1802 President James Fornero. "I have been a union man at all times and never once a scab [strikebreaker]," Prager wrote. He denied accusations that he was a German sympathizer, stating, "I am heart and soul for the good old USA. I am of German birth, of which accident I cannot help." On the afternoon of April 4, he posted copies of this letter near the Maryville mine and nearby saloons.

Leaving work at the end of the day, the Maryville miners were enraged to see copies of Prager's letter. A group of about six Maryville men went to Prager's Collinsville home in the 200 block of Vandalia Street, bringing along dozens of men who had been drinking at a nearby saloon. The group arrived at Prager's door around 9:45 p.m. and ordered him to leave town. Soon after, they demanded that Prager come out and kiss the flag to demonstrate his patriotism.

Prager was instructed to remove his shoes; wrapped in the flag and barefoot, he was paraded along Main Street in Collinsville, passing numerous saloons where miners and other working men were drinking. Many of the drinkers joined the mob, which soon grew to about 300 people. At approximately 10 p.m., three Collinsville police officers took Prager from the mob at Main and Seminary Streets and placed him in jail for his safety, in the basement of City Hall, three blocks away.

The mob reassembled on Main Street, with several hundred men marching behind a U.S. flag and singing "The Star-Spangled Banner" (a popular song that would not be designated as the national anthem until 1931). They stopped at the front steps of City Hall. Mayor John H. Siegel and a few others attempted to calm the mob, urging the men to allow federal authorities to handle Prager's case. Siegel argued that if Prager were a German spy, federal investigators might uncover important information.

The mob, attacking Siegel and other officials for their German ancestry, accused them of being pro-German as well. During this time, there had been an unsuccessful attempt by police officers to move Prager from the building. Unable to find a way to secretly remove him, they hid Prager among the sewer tiles in the basement after taking him out of his locked cell.

Around the same time, the mayor was informed that Prager had been taken away by federal authorities, and he announced this to the mob. However, many in the mob insisted on searching the building themselves. Believing Prager had been removed, Mayor Siegel agreed. During the search, two members of the mob located Prager and took him back to the remnants of the mob, which had returned to Main Street.

=== Lynching ===
The mob forced Prager to walk west on Main Street and the St. Louis Road, beating and harassing him along the way. He was made to sing patriotic songs and kiss the flag.

When the mob reached the top of Bluff Hill on the St. Louis Road, which overlooked St. Louis, some men took a car to find tar at a nearby streetcar stop, intending to tar and feather Prager, as they had with other targets of their wrath. However, they returned empty-handed, unable to find any tar.

One of the two men who had found Prager at City Hall, 28-year-old Joe Riegel (also of German ancestry), had taken a leading role since then. He found a length of manila rope in one of the cars and announced that Prager should be hanged. Although some men were initially reluctant, no one in the crowd spoke out.

Prager was allowed to write a final note to his parents in Dresden, Germany:

Dear Parents I must on this, the 4th day of April, 1918, die. Please pray for me, my dear parents.

He was hanged in front of a mob of 100 to 200 people, mostly men, at around 12:30 a.m. on April 5, 1918.

=== Investigation ===
Prager's death was initially investigated by Madison County Coroner Roy Lowe. His Coroner's Jury interviewed dozens of witnesses and, on April 11, charged five men with murder. They were: Joe Riegel, 28; Wesley Beaver, 26; Richard Dukes, 22; William Brockmeier, 41; and Enid Elmore, 21.

Riegel gave a "remarkably candid" confession to the Coroner's Jury about his role in the night's events. He also provided a full account to a reporter from the St. Louis Post-Dispatch.

A grand jury for Madison County, Illinois, was convened to hear testimony in the case. On April 25, they indicted the five men previously charged, along with seven others, for the murder of Prager. Additional suspects included: Charles Cranmer, 20; James DeMatties, 18; Frank Flannery, 19; Calvin Gilmore, 44; John Hallworth, 43; and Cecil Larremore, 17. The 12th man to be indicted, George Davis, was never further identified or located and was not prosecuted.

The grand jury also indicted four Collinsville police officers for omission of duty and nonfeasance due to their failure to protect Prager from the mob. He had not been charged with any crime when taken into custody.

== Trial and reaction ==
The trial began on May 13, 1918. Over the next two weeks, more than 700 prospective jurors were reviewed by attorneys to select the 12 men who would serve. Deputy sheriffs were sent throughout the county to gather eligible jurors. The judge refused to allow the defense counsel to attempt to demonstrate that Prager had been disloyal. The defense was based on three principal claims: no one could identify who had committed the crime, half of the defendants claimed they had not been present at the murder, and the others claimed they had been bystanders. This defense was used by Joe Riegel, who had previously confessed his involvement in the incident.

In its closing statements, the defense argued that Prager's lynching was justified by "unwritten law," which does not tolerate unpatriotic speech. After five days of statements and testimony, the case went to the jury on June 1, 1918. After deliberating for 10 minutes, the jury found all the defendants to be innocent. One juror reportedly shouted, "Well, I guess nobody can say we aren't loyal now." The prosecuting attorney dropped charges against the four policemen and George Davis, the defendant who had never been found.

A week after the trial, editor and publisher J. O. Monroe wrote an editorial in the Collinsville Herald, saying:

"Outside of a few persons who may still harbor Germanic inclinations, the whole city is glad that the eleven men indicted for the hanging of Robert P. Prager were acquitted." And further, "the community is well convinced that he was disloyal.... The city does not miss him. The lesson of his death has had a wholesome effect on the Germanists of Collinsville and the rest of the nation."

A New York Times editorial stated, "The new unwritten law appears to be that any group of men may execute justice, or what they consider justice, in any case arising from the war." The Chicago Daily Tribune editorialized: "The lynching of Prager was reprehensible enough in itself, but the effort to excuse it as an act of 'popular justice' is worse." The St. Louis Star noted that men were acquitted of lynching while American troops fought for democracy abroad:

"We must save our own soul as a nation. We cannot let ourselves go in such a way as was done in the Prager outrage and hold up our heads as civilized people. We are battling for right and humanity and should exhibit those qualities ourselves or be open to the charge of hypocrisy. We cannot successfully battle the Hun if we are to become the Hun ourselves."

Prager is buried at Saint Matthew Cemetery in the Bevo Mill neighborhood of St. Louis. The section of Bates Street, between Morgan Ford Road and Gravois Avenue, where the cemetery is located, was honorarily named "Robert Prager Way" in 2018.

=== Woodrow Wilson responds ===
The excessive post-World War I paranoia and vigilantism against "enemy aliens" (particularly Germans) across the United States—potentially incited by the Sedition Act, the Alien Act, and the Espionage Act(s) of late 1917—led some communities to place even German brewers under suspicion. In the case of the young German immigrant, Prager, his lynching aroused condemnation from President Woodrow Wilson.

== See also ==
- List of lynchings and other homicides in Illinois
- Anti-German sentiment
- Lynching of Olli Kinkkonen

== Bibliography ==
- Hickey, Donald R. "The Prager Affair: A Study in Wartime Hysteria," Journal of the Illinois State Historical Society, vol. 62, no. 2 (Summer 1969), pp. 117–134. In JSTOR
- Kirschbaum, Erik. Burning Beethoven: The Eradication of German Culture in the United States during World War I. New York, NY: Berlinica, 2015.
- Leonhard, Jörn (2018). Pandora's Box: A History of the First World War. London and Cambridge, MA: The Belknap Press of Harvard University Press. ISBN 978-0-78643-935-5.
- Luebke, Frederick C. (1974). Bonds of Loyalty; German-Americans and World War I. Northern Illinois University Press.
- Merkel, Jim (December 12, 2006). "Odd Fellows restore gravestone of German-American member lynched by mob in 1918". STLtoday.com.
- Schaffer, Ronald (1991). America in the Great War. Oxford University Press. ISBN 0-19-504904-7.
- Schwartz, E.A. "The Lynching of Robert Prager, the United Mine Workers, and the Problems of Patriotism in 1918," Journal of the Illinois State Historical Society, vol. 95, no. 4 (Winter 2003), pp. 414–437. In JSTOR
- Stehman, Peter. Patriotic Murder: A World War I Hate Crime for Uncle Sam. Lincoln, NE: Potomac Books, 2018.
- Weinberg, Carl R. Labor, Loyalty, and Rebellion: Southwestern Illinois Coal Miners and World War I. Carbondale, IL: Southern Illinois University Press, 2005.
