= Fred Moore (attorney) =

American lawyer

Fred H. Moore
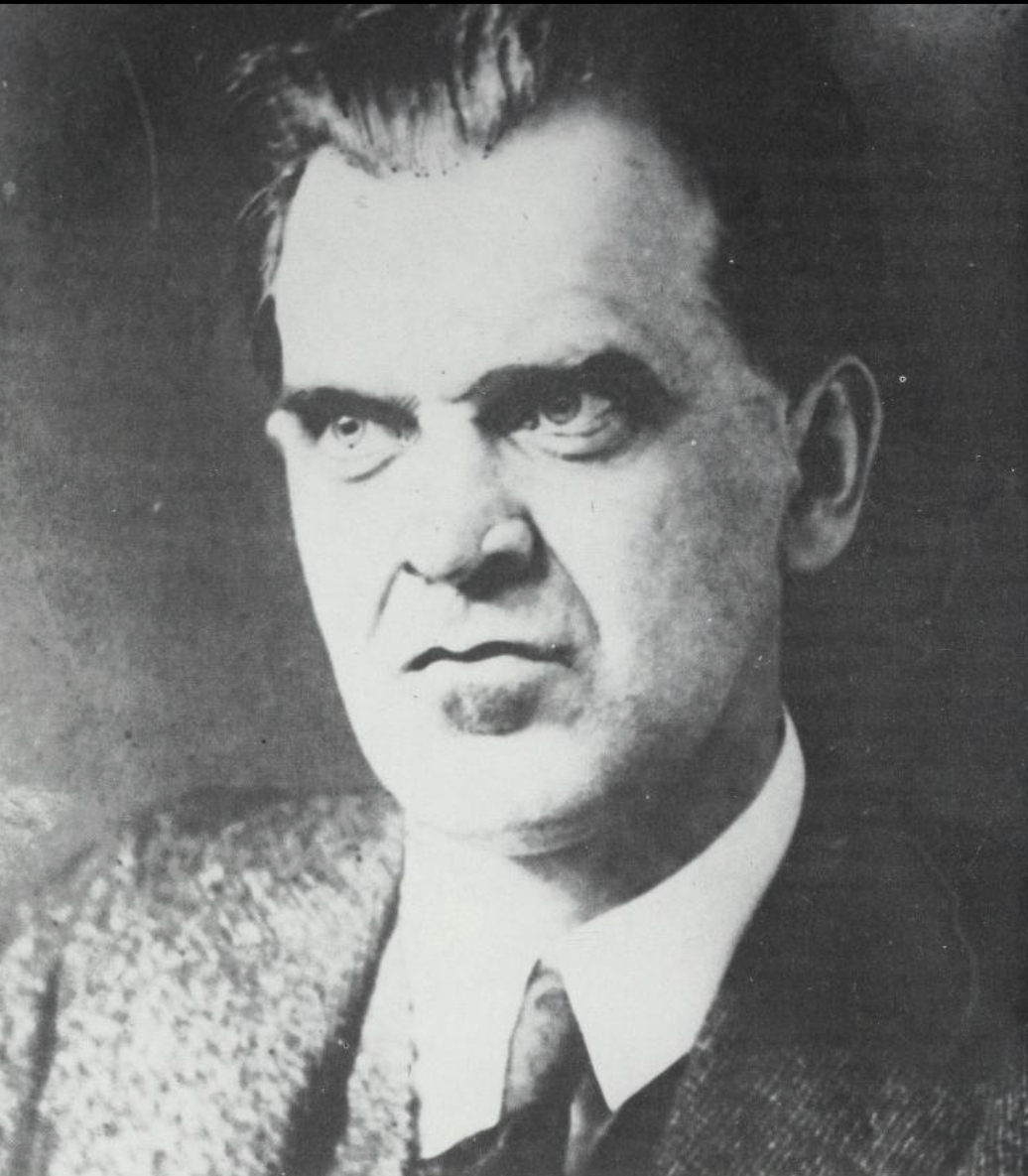
- Moore in 1927
- Born: 1882; Detroit, Michigan, U.S.
- Died: 1933 (aged 50–51); Los Angeles, California, U.S.
- Occupation: Lawyer
- Known for: Defense attorney in the Sacco and Vanzetti trial

Fred H. Moore (1882–1933) was a socialist lawyer and the defense attorney of the controversial Sacco and Vanzetti case. He had collaborated in many labor and Industrial Workers of the World trials. He played a minor role in several celebrated I.W.W. trials, including the Los Angeles Times bombing case in 1911 and the Ettor–Giovannitti case, which arose from the 1912 Lawrence, Massachusetts, textile strike. Following the acquittal of Ettor and Giovannitti, Moore spent the next several years roaming the country defending I.W.W. organizers. He was involved in the Centralia massacre trial and the mass prosecution, on charges of sedition, of the I.W.W. in Chicago in 1918. Errors in a later trial, however, led Big Bill Haywood to demand Moore's resignation as I.W.W. attorney in 1920. Moore's career was revived by his being hired to head the defense team for Sacco and Vanzetti in the summer of 1920.

== Sacco and Vanzetti case ==
Many Italians involved with the defense of Sacco and Vanzetti were suspicious of Moore from the start, but they desperately needed a lawyer, any lawyer. "We didn't know what to do", said Aldino Felicani, head of the Sacco-Vanzetti Defense Committee. "We were just in despair." Arriving in Boston and meeting with the two defendants, Moore immediately saw the case as more than a murder trial. The uncompromising anarchists Sacco and Vanzetti, Moore realized, had the potential to spark an international cause célèbre. While preparing his courtroom case, Moore began alerting labor and socialist organizations in America and Europe, thus setting the stage for the worldwide attention the two men would later draw.

But Moore's style annoyed more than the Defense Committee. Unkempt and utterly indifferent to decorum, he inspired little confidence in his clients. Sacco came to loathe Moore, and Vanzetti later regretted hiring him. In a letter written to Moore from prison, Sacco signed "Your implacable enemy, now and forever, Nick Sacco." Their fears were borne out in court, where Moore proved both incompetent and inflammatory. In the steamy courtroom, he frequently took off his jacket, and once, his shoes, enraging Judge Webster Thayer. Thayer routinely denied Moore's motions and lectured the California-based lawyer on how law was conducted in Massachusetts. Thayer once told reporters that "no long-haired anarchist from California can run this court!"

Fred Moore was considered by some much more than a criminal defense attorney. Eugene Lyons, a strong socialist who later went on to be a senior editor of Reader's Digest described Moore as an idealist with "no conscience once he decided his client was innocent. He would stop at nothing, frame evidence, suborn witnesses, have his people work on witnesses who had seen the wrong things". Lyons worked with Moore on publicity to stimulate the sympathies of those who were unaware of the two Italian anarchists' trials.

Moore's summation before the jury likewise failed to mention other factors that might have acquitted the men, including a cap found at the scene that did not fit Sacco and anomalies concerning Vanzetti's gun.

After Sacco and Vanzetti were convicted, however, Moore's passion for politics and notoriety consumed him. For the next three years, he dug up evidence in his clients' defense while simultaneously publicizing the case through worldwide labor channels. While the names Sacco and Vanzetti were chanted in marches across Europe and later South America, Moore filed appeal after appeal, keeping the men from a quick trip to the electric chair. He also interviewed several prosecution witnesses, raising doubts that still dog the case. However, Moore continued to anger both the defendants and their defense committee, and was dismissed from the case in 1924. He returned to Los Angeles to live with his ailing mother. He never tried another case. He did however, weigh in on the Sacco-Vanzetti case. In 1928, after the men had been executed, author Upton Sinclair interviewed Moore in connection with a book Sinclair was writing about the case. Sinclair was stunned to hear that Moore had come to conclude that both Sacco and Vanzetti were guilty. Many have since cited this as proof of their guilt, but others were skeptical. "Fred is embittered because he was dropped from the case and it has poisoned his mind", said one of Moore's many ex-wives. Boston corporate attorney William Thompson, who waged a spirited defense of the men following Moore's dismissal, never doubted the innocence of Sacco and Vanzetti. "To have known you 6 years ago", Vanzetti wrote to Thompson in 1926, "I would never have been a convict."

== Other cases ==
Moore represented Charles Krieger, an IWW member accused of bombing the home of oil executive J. Edgar Pew in Tulsa, Oklahoma, in October 1917. Krieger's first trial resulted in a mistrial and his second in an acquittal.

== Personal life and death ==
Moore is known to have had several marriages and one daughter. He died of cancer in Los Angeles in 1933.
