= American Protective League =

World War I-era organization

- Formation: 1917
- Founder: A. M. Briggs
- Dissolved: 1919
- Members: 250,000 (claimed)

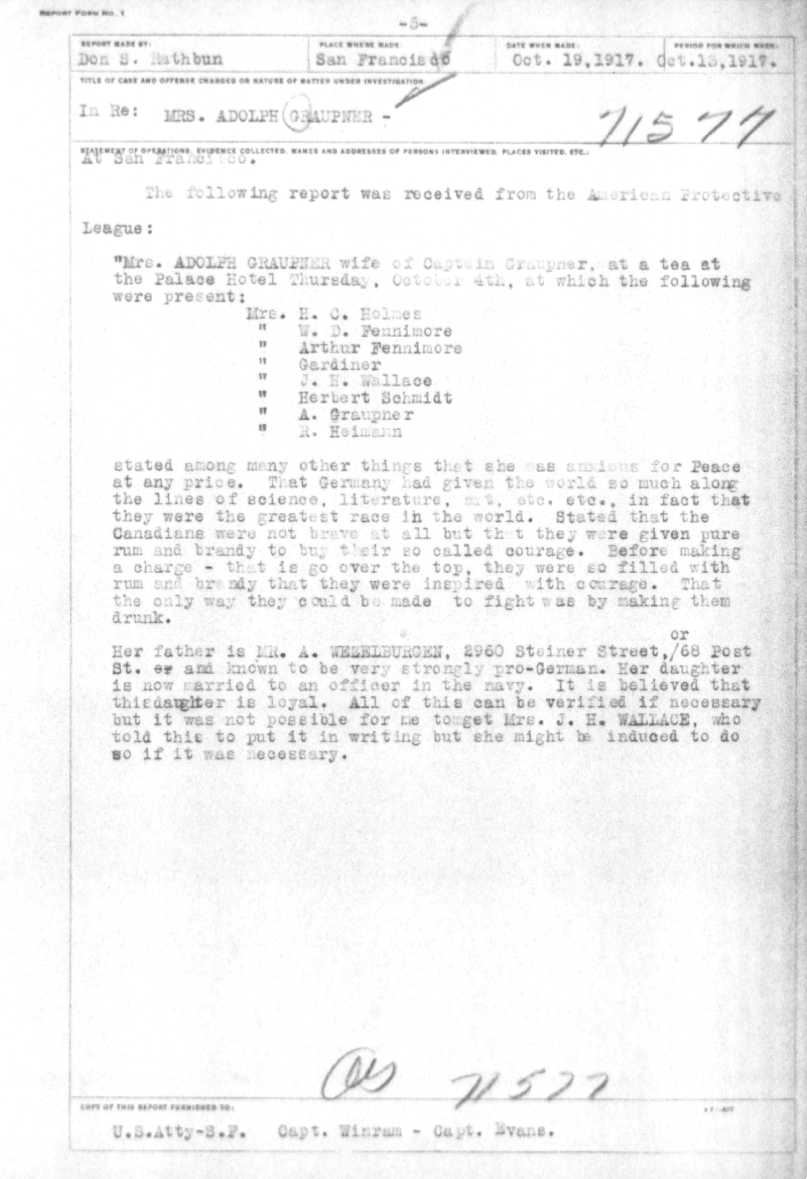
An APL intelligence report sent to the U.S. government detailing pro-German statements

The American Protective League (1917–1919) was an organization of private citizens sponsored by the United States Department of Justice that worked with federal law enforcement agencies during the World War I era. Its mission was to identify suspected German sympathizers and to counteract the activities of radicals, anarchists, anti-war activists, and left-wing labor and political organizations. At its zenith, the APL claimed 250,000 members in 600 cities.

== Organizational history ==
=== Founding ===
The APL was formed in 1917 by Albert M. Briggs, a wealthy Chicago advertising executive. Briggs believed the Department of Justice was severely understaffed in the field of counterintelligence in the new wartime environment. He proposed a new volunteer auxiliary, with participants neither paid nor given expense accounts. Briggs was given authority to proceed with his plan by the Department of Justice on March 22, 1917, and by President Woodrow Wilson and his cabinet on March 30, 1917, and the American Protective League (APL) was born.

Although technically a private organization, the APL nevertheless was the beneficiary of semi-official status. The group received formal approval from Attorney General Thomas Gregory, who authorized the APL to carry on its letterhead the words "Organized with the Approval and Operating under the Direction of the United States Department of Justice, Bureau of Investigation."

Under this directive, the APL worked with the Bureau of Investigation (BOI)—precursor to the FBI—which gathered information for U.S. District Attorneys. APL assistance was welcomed by the BOI, which in 1915 had only 219 field agents, without direct statutory authorization to carry weapons or to make general arrests. Thus the author of a letter to the New York Times claimed membership in the APL and described it as "a volunteer unpaid auxiliary of the Department of Justice" in which he and his colleagues "have been acting upon cases assigned by the Department of Justice, Military Intelligence, State Department, Civil Service, Provost Marshal General, etc."

APL members sometimes wore badges suggesting a quasi-official status: "American Protective League–Secret Service." The Attorney General boasted of the manpower they provided: "I have today several hundred thousand private citizens... assisting the heavily overworked Federal authorities in keeping an eye on disloyal individuals and making reports of disloyal utterances."

In a letter to Briggs, the Justice Department told the APL that it was not only "of great importance prior to our entering the war, it became of vastly greater importance after that step had been taken." The government had been receiving complaints of disloyalty and enemy activities, and while the Bureau of Investigation was doing its best to contain the situation, the letter continued, the Protective League served as an auxiliary force to put a stop to corruption within the borders of the United States.

Business interests strongly supported the APL as a tool to fight organized labor. Henry Ford provided financial support and assigned a Ford Motor Company executive to supervise 400 APL operatives.

=== Membership and structure ===
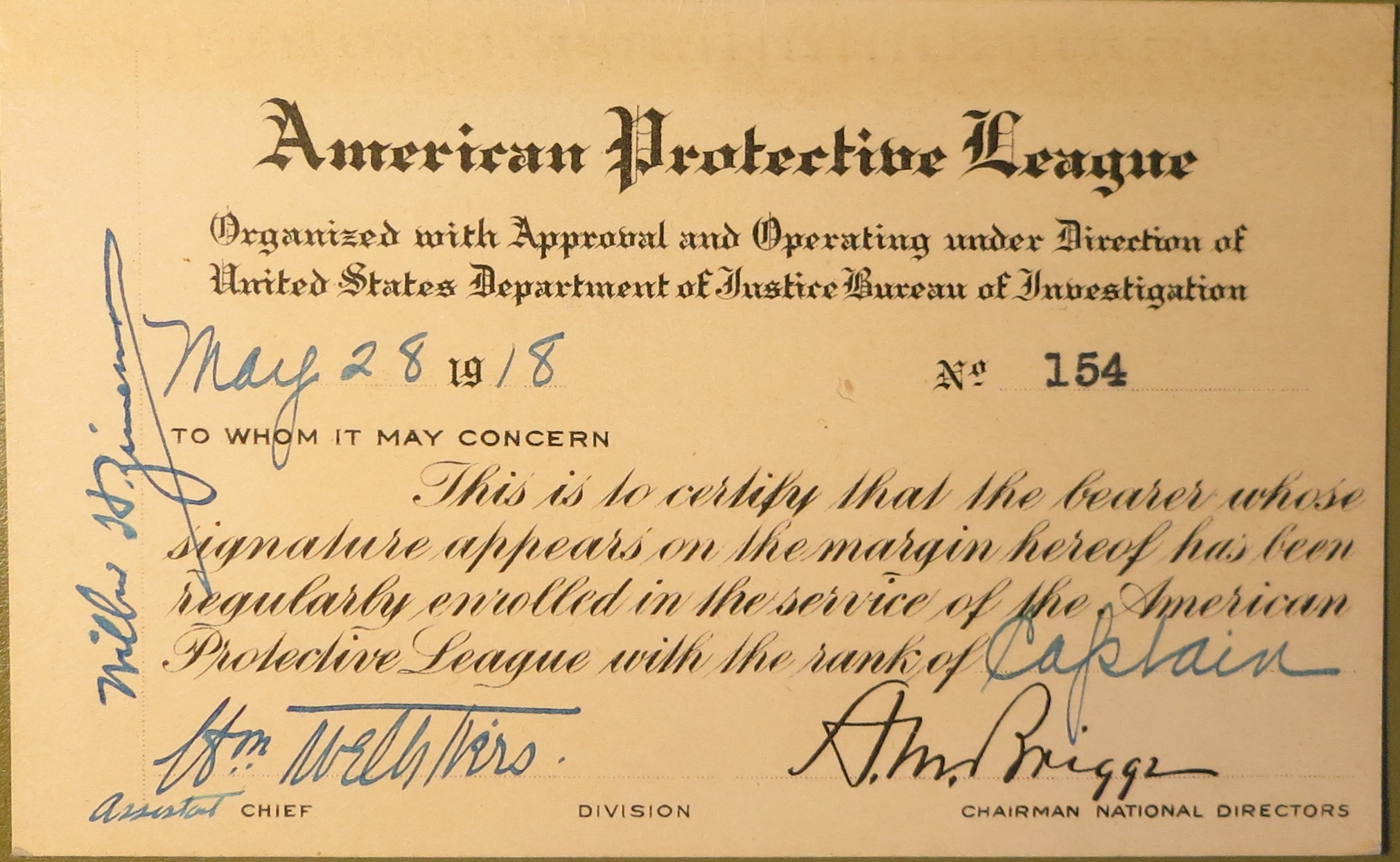
An American Protective League membership card

At its zenith, the American Protective League claimed 250,000 dues-paying members in 600 cities. It was claimed that 52 million Americans—approximately half of the country's population—lived in communities in which the APL maintained an active presence.

The national headquarters of the APL was established in Washington, D.C., with Briggs installed as the Chairman of the governing National Board of Directors. Charles Daniel Frey, of Chicago, served as the national director of the American Protective League.

In addition to its regular geographically based network, the APL attempted to organize secret units inside factories producing clothing and war materiel, with a view to identification of those advancing "discouraging disloyalty" or engaging in pro-German activities. Suspects would be reported within the APL, which would then make use of its broader network in the community to investigate these suspects' activities after working hours, if deemed necessary.

=== Activities ===
Teams of APL members conducted numerous raids and surveillance activities aimed at those who failed to register for the draft and at German immigrants who were suspected of sympathies for Germany. APL headquarters and the Justice Department in Washington often lost control over field operations, to the point that U.S. Attorneys and BOI agents, assisted by cadres of volunteers from the APL and other similar patriotic auxiliaries, pursued suspects of disloyalty on their own initiative and in their own manner. APL members "spotted violators of food and gasoline regulations, rounded up draft evaders in New York, disrupted Socialist meetings in Cleveland, broke strikes, [and] threatened union men with immediate induction into the army." In the most extraordinary cooperative action, thousands of APL members joined authorities in New York City for three days of checking registration cards. This resulted in more than 75,000 arrests, though fewer than 400 of those arrested were shown to be guilty of anything more than failing to carry their cards. APL agents, many of them female, worked undercover in factories and attended union meetings in hope of uncovering saboteurs and other enemies of the war effort.

APL members were accused of acting as vigilantes, allegedly violating the civil liberties of American citizens, including so-called "anti-slacker raids" designed to round up men who had not registered for the draft. The APL was also accused of illegally detaining citizens associated with anarchist, labor, and pacifist movements.

An APL report on its actions in the Northwest for five months in 1918 showed that among its 25 activities, its largest effort (some 10% of its activity), was in disrupting the Industrial Workers of the World (IWW). Some IWW members had been involved in violent labor disputes and bomb plots against U.S. businessmen and government officials. In turn, the IWW alleged that APL members burgled and vandalized IWW offices and harassed IWW members.

== Other organizations ==
During World War I, the APL was joined by many similar groups formed by civilians to fight against foreign infiltration and sabotage. The Anti Yellow Dog League was a youth organization composed of school boys over the age of ten, who sought out disloyal persons. Such leagues and societies branched across the nation. Other groups included the Knights of Liberty, Sedition Slammers, Terrible Threateners, Boy Spies of America, National Security League, and American Defense Society.

=== Criticism ===
President Wilson knew of the APL's activities and had misgivings about its methods. He wrote to Attorney General Gregory expressing his concern: "It would be dangerous to have such an organization operating in the United States, and I wonder if there is any way in which we could stop it?" But he deferred to Gregory's judgment and took no action to curtail the APL, officially approving the organization along with his cabinet.

The APL also worked with the army's Military Intelligence Division (MID), the government's principal investigatory agency in this period. When the relationship between the APL and the MID became public early in 1919, the revelations embarrassed Secretary of War Newton D. Baker. Baker tried to end the War Department's use of volunteer spies.

=== Disbandment ===
After the Armistice with Germany ended the war, Gregory credited the APL with the defeat of German spies and propaganda. He claimed that his Department still required the APL's services as enemy nations sought to weaken American resolve during the peace negotiations, especially as newly democratic Germany sought kindlier treatment than its predecessor government might have expected.

A. Mitchell Palmer succeeded Gregory as Attorney General on March 5, 1919. Before assuming office, he had opposed the APL activities. One of Palmer's first acts was to release 10,000 aliens of German ancestry who had been taken into government custody during the war. He stopped accepting intelligence gathered by the APL. He ordered some APL agents arrested. He also refused to share information in his APL-provided files when Ohio Governor James M. Cox requested it. He called the APL materials "gossip, hearsay information, conclusions, and inferences" and added that "information of this character could not be used without danger of doing serious wrong to individuals who were probably innocent." In March 1919, when some in Congress and the press were urging him to reinstate the Justice Department's wartime relationship with the APL, he told reporters that "its operation in any community constitutes a grave menace."

A few months after the Armistice, the League officially disbanded, even as its members insisted they could serve as they had earlier in wartime against America's post-war enemies, "these bomb fiends, Bolsheviki, IWW's and other fiends." The publication of the organization's story as The Web: A Revelation of Patriotism was an attempt to revive its fortunes as well. That volume by Emerson Hough, an author of Western novels, called for a program of "selective immigration, deportation of un-Americans, and denaturalization of 'disloyal' citizens and anarchists." It said: "We must purify the source of America's population and keep it pure." On June 3, 1919, the Washington Post called for the revival of the APL to fight anarchists.

The APL survived as a series of local organizations under other names, such as the Patriotic American League (Chicago) and the Loyalty League (Cleveland). New Jersey members served as investigators for New York's Lusk Committee investigation of radicals and political dissenters. APL members continued to provide information and manpower to the Department of Justice, notably during the Palmer raids of January 1920. In the 1920s, the Ku Klux Klan recruited members from the Southern branches of the APL. For years following the war, J. Edgar Hoover's General Intelligence Unit in the Justice Department drew on the APL for information about radicals.

== See also ==
- Alexander Mitchell Palmer
- Ralph Van Deman
- Junior G-Men
