= Michael Paul Mason =

- Born: May 29, 1971 (age 55); Tulsa, Oklahoma, U.S.
- Occupation: Writer
- Writing career
- Genres: Science, non-fiction
- Notable works: Head Cases: Stories of Brain Injury and Its Aftermath

Michael Paul Mason (born May 29, 1971, in Tulsa, Oklahoma), sometimes credited as Michael Mason, is an American writer, author, editor, and journalist.

== Literary work ==
Mason's first book of non-fiction, Head Cases: Stories of Brain Injury and Its Aftermath, chronicles the years he spent as a brain injury case manager and tells the stories of twelve individuals who survived brain injury.

While a contributing editor for Discover magazine, Mason wrote the article, "Dead Men Walking", which triggered a national debate about the treatment of brain-injured veterans of the Iraq War. As an independent radio producer, Mason has created works that have appeared on several public radio stations.

Mason is the founding editor of This Land Press, a publication based in Tulsa, Oklahoma.

== Bibliography ==
=== Books ===
- Head Cases: Stories of Brain Injury and Its Aftermath (Farrar, Straus and Giroux, 2008)

=== Articles ===
- "Dead Men Walking", Discover (2007)
- "Iraq's Medical Meltdown", Discover (2007)
- "The 9/11 Cover-Up", Discover (2007)
- "How to Teach Science to the Pope", Discover (2008)
- "Keeping Our Heads" (op-ed), The New York Times (2009)
- "The Disappearance of Ford Beckman" The Believer (2009)
- "Narrative Lost and Found", This Land Press (2010)
- "The Future of Writing Is in My Jacket", The Late American Novel: Writers on the Future of Books, Soft Skull Press (2011)

== Radio production ==
- "Inside the Glore," (2009)
- "The Guardian of the Murder House," (2009)
- "Goodbye Tulsa" (weekly series)
