= John T. Meints =

German-American farmer tarred and feathered during WW1

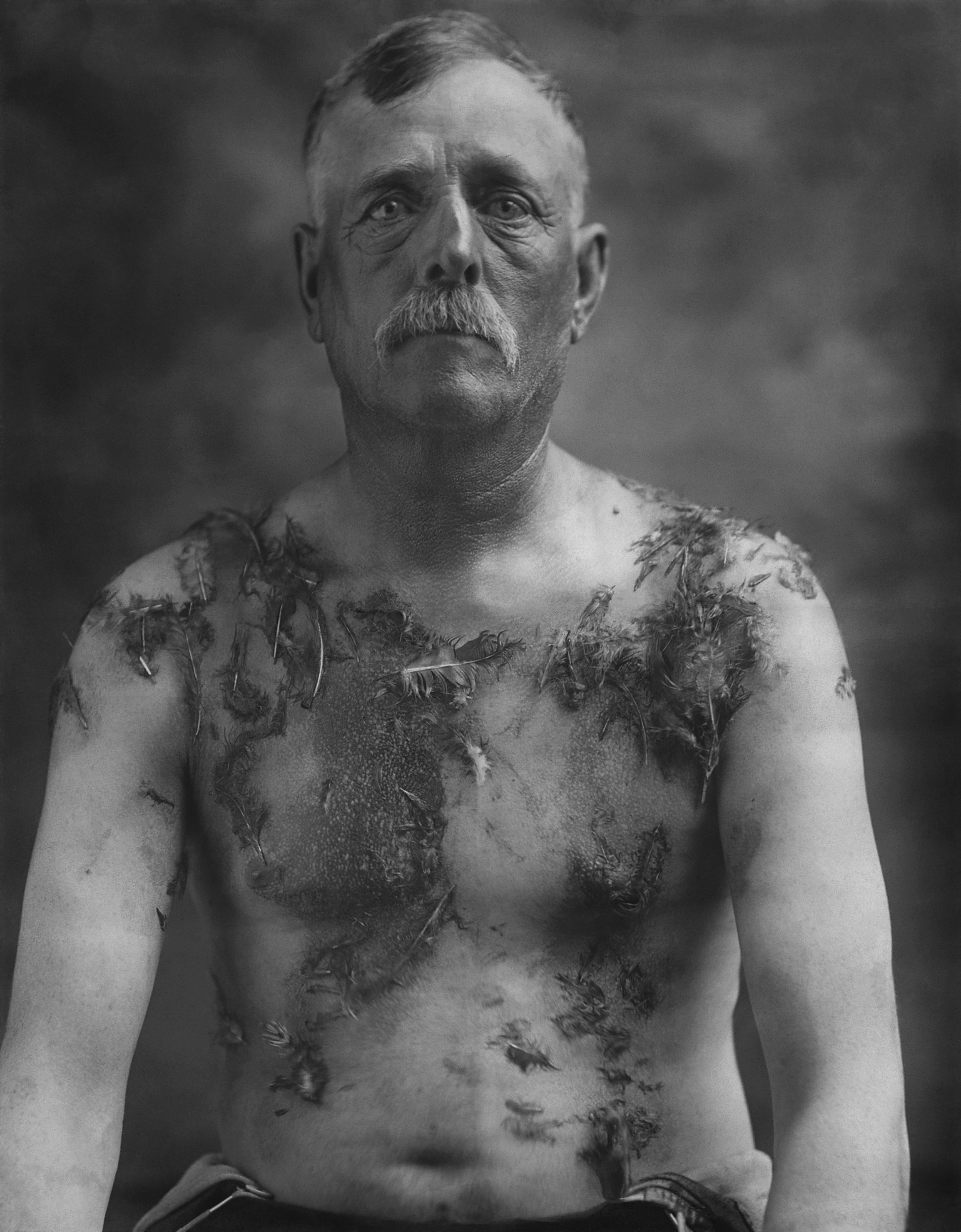
- John Meints after the attack (1918–1919)
- Born: July 3, 1862; Ogle County, Illinois, US
- Died: April 13, 1942 (aged 79); Hardwick, Minnesota, US
- Body discovered: April 14, 1942
- Other names: John Meintz
- Occupation: farmer
- Known for: being tarred and feathered during World War I

John T. Meints Sr. (July 3, 1862 – April 13, 1942) was a German-American farmer and member of the Nonpartisan League who lived in Luverne, Minnesota. On August 19, 1918, he was ambushed by 32 anti-German men who tarred and feathered Meints. Meints filed a lawsuit for $100,000 against the men but was denied.

== Early life ==
John Meints was born to German immigrants Tjark Janssen Meints (1830–1907) and Jantje Grabhorn (1826–1916). John worked on his family's farm until 1882, when he met and married Augusta Haas (1862–1935). The couple had three children: Tjark Charles Meints (1882–1973), Fred J. Meints (1884–1956), and John J. Meints (1886–1969). After his mother's death in 1916, John was chased out of Iowa by a mob and moved to Denver Township and later Luverne, Minnesota, where he was unpopular due to his perceived disloyalty.

== Tar and feather incident ==
Meints was a farmer and member of the left-wing Nonpartisan League (NPL). In 1918, he had been part of attempts to found an NPL newspaper. In June of that year, local war-effort loyalists from the Loyalty League, with the support of local officials, went from house to house to force all members of the party in Rock County to register. In addition, the loyalists held their own hearings, attempted to force NPL members to renounce their membership, and forced NPL members out of the state. At the same time, the mayor also forced the newspaper to close. The vast majority of farmers who were approached by loyalists renounced their membership, while Meints did not. Meints was kidnapped from his home on June 19, 1918, for allegedly not supporting war bonds during the First World War. The local newspaper reported that the incident was neither disorderly nor violent. After reporting the incident to the U.S. Department of Justice, Meints was informed that he could safely return home.

Two months later, on August 19, Meints was dragged off a train heading to Saint Paul in front of his son Fred. John was kidnapped, flogged with a rope, and tarred and feathered by 32 Minnesota men in South Dakota, again for allegedly not supporting war bonds and for financially backing the NPL. Additionally, he was threatened with lynching. It was later proven in court that Meints had bought war bonds, saved food stamps, and had contributed time to the American Red Cross. He also claimed in court that he was of Danish and Dutch descent, which was false. Meints filed legal action against the men at Mankato and the case was overseen by circuit court judge Wilbur F. Booth in St, Louis, Missouri. Meints requested $100,000 but was denied for "disloyalty". The group of accused men were afterwards received in town "with dignitaries and a brass band."

In 1921, the ruling was reversed, but the Eighth Circuit Court of Appeals ordered a new trial. Meints instead settled for $6,000.

Andrew Napolitano has called Meints' case "the best illustration of the judicial response to anti-German mob violence".

=== Identity of attackers ===
Meints identified Reverend H. W. Bedford, a Methodist minister working in South St. Paul, along with Leo Connell, Otto Ihlan, and Bert Weiss as directly taking part in the flogging and tarring. Meints accused several others as being part of the mob, including: O. P. Huntington, the President of the First National Bank of Luverne; Otto Steinfeldt, blacksmith; George Michelson, real estate dealer; James Horne, gravestone salesman; A. F. Miner, factory foreman; W. C. Parr, real estate dealer; Harry Rodman, Bert Cross, president of the Farmers' National Bank; and L. Woodrow, a retired farmer.

== Later years ==
He lived in Luverne until 1930 when he moved to Hardwick. On April 12, 1942, Meints left a coal stove on before he went to sleep and failed to put out the fire. He was found dead in his bed; his death was deemed to be asphyxiation relating to coal gas.
