= W. Tate Brady =

Early Tulsa, Oklahoma, businessman and community leader

Wyatt Tate Brady
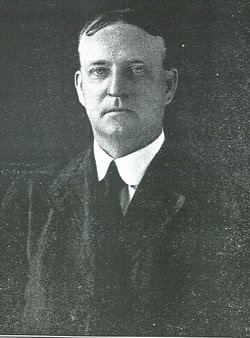
- Wyatt Tate Brady
- Born: Wyatt Tate Brady; January 20, 1870; Forest City, Missouri, U.S.
- Died: August 29, 1925 (aged 55); Tulsa, Oklahoma, U.S.
- Resting place: Oaklawn Cemetery, Tulsa, Oklahoma
- Citizenship: American; Cherokee Nation (after 1895)
- Occupations: Merchant, entrepreneur, politician
- Known for: Founder of Tulsa, Member of Oklahoma Bar Association, Klansman, Chairman United Confederate Veterans 28th Annual Reunion
- Political party: Democratic
- Spouse: Rachel Davis (m. 1895)
- Children: 5

Wyatt Tate Brady (January 20, 1870 – August 29, 1925) was an American merchant, politician, former Ku Klux Klan member, and a founder of Tulsa, Oklahoma.

== Early life ==
Wyatt Tate Brady was born in Forrest City, Missouri on January 20, 1870. In 1890, he moved to Tulsa as a shoe salesman and opened the town's first mercantile store. On April 10, 1895, Brady married Rachel Davis, a member of a prominent Cherokee family. After the marriage, Brady became a citizen of the Cherokee Nation and became a strong advocate for their claims against the United States.

== Founding Tulsa ==
In 1896, Brady and other prominent businessmen signed the charter to officially incorporate Tulsa in Indian Territory. Following the 1901 discovery of the Red Fork oil field, Brady began construction on the Brady Hotel in 1902. The hotel opened in 1903, taking advantage of the oil boom by providing a hotel for oil executives. The 1905 discovery of the Glenn Pool further boosted the hotel's popularity. It also served as a meeting ground for the Democratic Party.

In March 1905, Brady traveled the country on a train with about 100 civic leaders, a band, and Will Rogers to promote the city of Tulsa. After statehood, he was named to the Democratic National Committee in 1907. He supported many early Governors such as Charles N. Haskell and Robert L. Williams.

== Tulsa Outrage ==
In the lead up to the Tulsa Outrage, Brady served as a member of the Tulsa Home Guard. On November 6, 1917, Brady physically assaulted the owner of the Hotel Fox, E. L. Fox, for renting to the Industrial Workers of the World. According to eyewitness accounts conducted by L.A. Brown of the National Civil Liberties Bureau, Brady led a Knights of Liberty attack against IWW members on November 9, 1917, and personally whipped them. The next day, the Tulsa Daily World announces that the "Modern Ku Klux Klan" had come into being.

== Tulsa race massacre of 1921 ==
Brady served as a night watchman during the 1921 Tulsa race massacre. He reportedly witnessed "five dead negroes" with one being dragged behind an automobile, with a rope about his neck, throughout the business district. After the massacre, Brady was appointed to the Tulsa Real Estate Exchange Commission which was tasked with assessing the property damage from the massacre. The commission planned to expand railroads in the area to segregate white and black parts of town writing "We further believe that the two races being divided by an industrial section will draw more distinctive lines between them and thereby eliminate the intermingling of the lower elements of the two races." The commission's plans were halted by the Supreme Court of Oklahoma.

== Ku Klux Klan activities ==
In 1923, the Klan, established as the Tulsa Benevolent Society, paid $200,000 for the construction of a large "Klavern" or gathering hall that could seat 3,000 members. It was finished as Beno Hall on land owned by Brady.

At a 1923 military tribunal, Brady stated that he, like his father before him, had been a member of the Klan but he had quit the Klan in 1922.

== Death and legacy ==
Brady died by suicide on August 29, 1925, by shooting himself in the temple. He was said to be despondent over the death of his son, John Davis Brady, who was killed in a car accident in the spring of 1925 while studying law at the University of Virginia.

=== Eponym ===
Brady was commemorated for his part in the founding of Tulsa with numerous locations named after him in Tulsa including: Brady Hotel (demolished 1975 after fire), Brady Street (renamed M. B. Brady Street in 2013 and Reconciliation Way in 2019), Brady Heights (renamed The Heights in 2021), Brady Theatre (renamed Tulsa Theater in 2019), Brady Mansion (renamed Skyline Mansion in 2016), and the Brady Arts District (renamed Tulsa Arts District in 2017).

After journalist Lee Roy Chapman revealed Brady's Ku Klux Klan membership in the early 2010s, the Tulsa City Council voted 7–1 to change Brady Street to MB Brady Street to honor Mathew Brady, a famed Civil War photographer who had no ties to Tulsa or Oklahoma. They also voted to add honorary signs that read "Reconciliation Way" around the Inner Dispersal Loop.

Brady built a mansion known as "Arlington" that was patterned after the ancestral home of the Lee family in Virginia. It later became known as Brady Mansion. The mansion was bought by former NFL first-round draft pick and Tulsa native, Felix Jones, in 2016 and is now known as Skyline Mansion. It can be seen on the cover of Fire in Little Africa, a groundbreaking album released in May 2021 on Motown's sub-label Black Forum. The album consists of original material that was written and recorded by a collective of Oklahoma hip hop artists to commemorate the 100th anniversary of the Tulsa race massacre, which W. Tate Brady took part in organizing, and was recorded over a five-day period in March 2020. Studios were set up at the Greenwood Cultural Center and at the Skyline Mansion.

In September 2017, the Brady Arts District Business Association voted to change the name of the district, north of downtown, to the Tulsa Arts District in order to completely sever ties with the street's original namesake.

In 2018, the Tulsa City Council voted to rename "Mathew Brady Street" to "Reconciliation Way". On December 6, 2018, the Brady Theater (formerly Tulsa Convention Hall and Tulsa Municipal Theater) announced that it is changing its name to The Tulsa Theater in 2019.

In September 2021, Brady Heights voted to rename itself "The Heights."

=== Monuments ===
Tate Brady formerly had a star bearing his name outside the Cain's Ballroom (Brady had the original building built as a garage) until 2020 when the owners had the star removed.
