= Boy Spies of America =

American vigilance organization

The Boy Spies of America was a children's group organized during World War I. It was one of a dozen of extralegal vigilance organizations dedicated to volunteer spying which arose during that war. The group is similar to other organizations, such as the Sedition Slammers, the Terrible Threateners, the American Protective League, and the Knights of Liberty.

Initially the group was created to punish Americans who spoke out against the war. Members reinforced a climate of anti-German sentiment and stopped young men on the street, demanding to see their draft cards. After some time, members targeted any person who spoke negatively about any part of American life.

Throughout its existence, the group failed to identify any German spies.

== See also ==
- American Protective League
- American Defense Society
- National Security League
- Junior G-Men
