= Lynching of Jake Brooks =

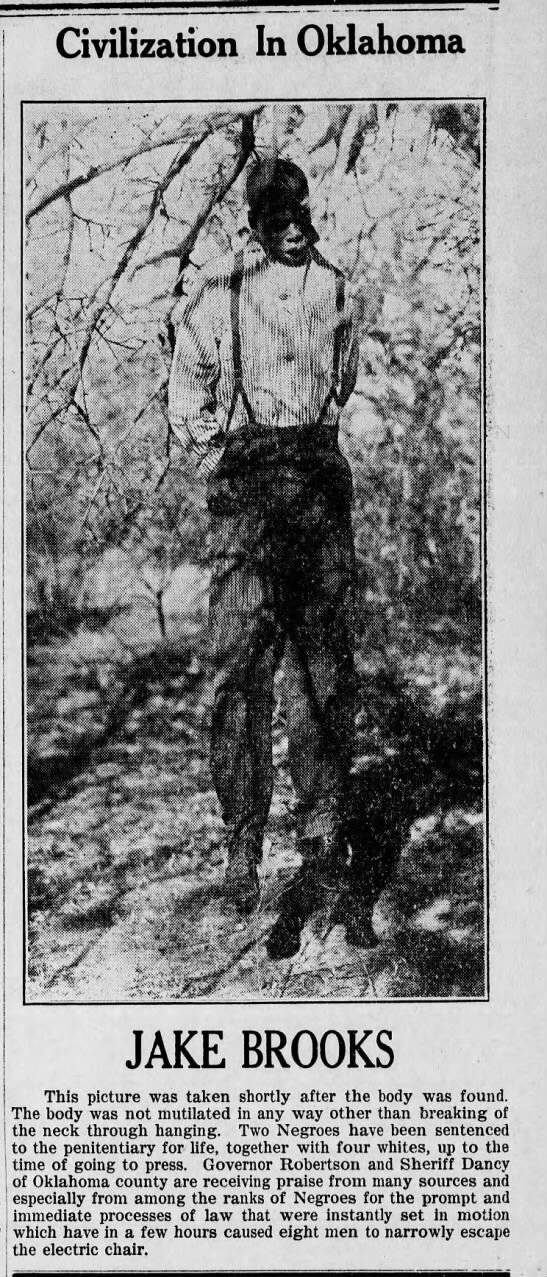
- The body of Jake Brooks
- Date: January 14, 1922
- Location: Oklahoma City, Oklahoma
- Participants: A mob hangs Jake Brooks
- Deaths: 1

The lynching of Jake Brooks occurred in Oklahoma City, Oklahoma on January 14, 1922.

== Background ==
In 1922, the meatpackers Union in Oklahoma City was on strike. Militant strikers were angered by scab workers taking their jobs and plotted to make an example.

== Lynching ==
The militants went to great lengths and even recruited Jake Brooks' own cousin to take part in the lynching. They abducted him from his home on Saturday, January 14, 1922, drove him 5 5 miles (8.0 km) out of Oklahoma City and hanged him from a tree. It took three days for his body to be discovered.

== Aftermath ==
The local police were initially hesitant to investigate the killing but Governor James B.A. Robertson directly intervened and five "ringleaders" were arrested, charged, pleaded guilty and were sentenced. They were Lee Whitley, 29; Charles Polk, 18; Elmert Yearta, 19; (the three white accused) and Robert Allen, 27; Nathan Butler, 40 (the two black accused). Each of the men later pleaded guilty to murder and were sentenced to life in prison.

Photographs of Jake Brooks's hanged body are sent to Congress, hoping for passage of the Dyer Anti-Lynching Bill. The Dyer Anti-Lynching Bill was first introduced in 1918 by Representative Leonidas C. Dyer, a Republican from St. Louis, Missouri, in the United States House of Representatives as H.R. 11279. It was intended to establish lynching as a federal crime. The Dyer Anti-Lynching Bill was re-introduced in subsequent sessions of Congress and passed, 230 to 119, by the U.S. House of Representatives on January 26, 1922, but its passage was halted in the Senate by a filibuster by Southern Democrats, who formed a powerful block. Southern Democrats justified their opposition to the bill by arguing that lynchings were a response to rapes and proclaiming that lynchings were an issue that should be left for states to deal with.

Attempts to pass similar legislation took a halt until the Costigan–Wagner Bill of 1934. It was not until 2018 that the Senate passed the anti-lynching legislation Justice for Victims of Lynching Act, on which the House of Representatives took no action. On February 26, 2020, the House passed a revised version, the Emmett Till Antilynching Act, by a vote of 410–4. A revised version of the bill that includes a serious bodily injury standard was passed by the 117th Congress, and was signed into law by President Joe Biden on March 29, 2022.

== Bibliography ==
Notes

References

- "Five members of Lynching party – three white and two black, caught tried and sentenced to life imprisonment within 5 days". The Dallas Express. Dallas, Texas: W.E. King. February 4, 1922. pp. 1–8. ISSN 2331-334X. OCLC 9839625.
- "Martial Law At Oklahoma City". Durant Weekly News. Durant, Bryan, Oklahoma: Lewis Paullin. January 20, 1922. pp. 1–8. ISSN 2163-8012. OCLC 35709904.
- "Lynchers Jailed For Life.; Five Sentenced in Oklahoma for Slaying Packing House Worker". New York Times. January 25, 1922. ISSN 1553-8095. OCLC 1645522.
- Zangrando, Robert Lewis (1963). The Efforts of the National Association for the Advancement of Colored People to Secure Passage of a Federal Anti-lynching Law, 1920–1940. University of Pennsylvania. - Total pages:920
- United States Senate Committee on the Judiciary (1926). "To Prevent and Punish the Crime of Lynching: Hearings Before the United States Senate Committee on the Judiciary, Subcommittee on S. 121, Sixty-Ninth Congress, First Session, on Feb. 16, 1926". United States Government Publishing Office.

Number	Name	Date	Place	Method of lynching	Number of victims
1	Bill McAllister	January 8, 1922	Williamsburg, S.C.	Shot	1
2	Lincoln Hickson	January 8, 1922	Williamsburg, S.C.	Shot	1
3	Willie Jenkins	January 10, 1922	Eufaula, Alabama	Shot	1
4	Jake Brooks	January 14, 1922	Oklahoma City, Oklahoma	Hanged	1
5	Charles Strong	January 17, 1922	Mayo, Florida	Hanged	1
6	Will Bell	January 29, 1922	Pontotoc, Mississippi	Shot	1
7	Unidentified	January 29, 1922	Pontotoc, Mississippi	Shot	
8	Drew Conner (White)	January 28, 1922	Bolinger, Alabama	Burned	1
9	Will Thrasher	February 1, 1922	Crystal Springs, Mississippi	Hanged	1
10	Harry Harrison	February 2, 1922	Malvern, Arkansas	Shot	1
11	Manuel Duarte	February 2, 1922	Cameron County, Texas	Shot	1
12	P. Norman	February 11, 1922	Texarkana, Arkansas	Shot	1
13	Will Jones	February 13, 1922	Ellaville, Georgia	Shot	1
14	William Baker	March 8, 1922	Aberdeen, Mississippi	Hanged	1
15	Alfred Williams	March 12, 1922	Harlem, Georgia	Hanged	1
16	Brown Culpepper (White)	March 13, 1922	Holly Grove, Louisiana	Shot	1
17	Jerry Ingram	March 17, 1922	Crawford, Mississippi	Shot	1
18	Unidentified (white)	March 19, 1922	Okay, Oklahoma	Drowned	1
19	Alexander Smith	March 22, 1922	Gulfport, Mississippi	Hanged	1
20	Snap Curry	May 6, 1922	Kirvin, Texas	Burned	1
21	H. Varney (or Johnnie Cornish)	May 6, 1922	Kirvin, Texas	Burned	1
22	Mose Jones	May 6, 1922	Kirvin, Texas	Burned	1
23	Tom Cornish	May 8, 1922	Kirvin, Texas	Hanged	1
24	Thomas Early	May 17, 1922	Conroe, Texas	Burned	1
25	Charles Atkins	May 18, 1922	Davisboro, Georgia	Burned	1
26	Hullen Owens	May 19, 1922	Texarkana, Texas	Hanged (body burned)	1
27	Joe Winters	May 20, 1922	Conroe, Texas	Burned	1
28	Mose Bozier	May 20, 1922	Alleyton, Texas	Hanged	1
29	Gilbert Wilson	May 23, 1922	Bryan, Texas	Beaten to death	1
30	Jesse Thomas	May 26, 1922	Waco, Texas	Shot (body burned)	1
31	William Byrd	May 28, 1922	Brentwood, Georgia	Shot (body burned)	1
32	Robert Collins	June 20, 1922	Summit, Mississippi	Hanged	1
33	Warren Lewis	June 23, 1922	New Dacus, Texas	Hanged	1
34	James Harvey	July 1, 1922	Lanes Bridge, Georgia	Hanged	1
35	Joe Jordan	July 1, 1922	Lanes Bridge, Georgia	Hanged	1
36	Philip Tankard	July 5, 1922	Belhaven, North Carolina	Shot	1
37	Joe Pemberton	July 7, 1922	Benton, Louisiana	Hanged	1
38	Jake "Shake" Davis	July 14, 1922	Miller County, Georgia	Hanged	1
39	Oscar Mack	July 18, 1922	Orange County, Florida	Hanged (False report, Oscar Mack survived)	1
40	Will Anderson	July 24, 1922	Allentown, Georgia	Shot	1
41	John West	July 28, 1922	Guernsey, Arkansas	Shot	1
42	Gilbert Harris	August 1, 1922	Hot Springs, Arkansas	Hanged	1
43	John Glover	August 1, 1922	Holton,	Shot	1
44	Bayner Blackwell	August 6, 1922	Swansboro, North Carolina	Shot	1
45	John Steelman	August 23, 1922	Lambert, Mississippi	Burned	1
46	Thomas Rivers	August 30, 1922	Bossier Parish, Louisiana	Hanged	1
47	F. Watt Daniels (White)	August 1922	Mer Rouge, Louisiana	Ku-Klux Klan	1
48	Thomas F. Richards (White)	August 1922	Mer Rouge, Louisiana	Ku-Klux Klan	1
49	Jim Reed Long	September 2, 1922	Winder, Georgia	Ku-Klux Klan	1
50	O.J. Johnson	September 7, 1922	Newton, Texas	Hanged	1
51	Jim Johnston	September 28, 1922	Sandersville, Georgia	Hanged	1
52	Grover C. Everett	September 28, 1922	Abilene, Texas	Shot	1
53	John Brown	October 3, 1922	Montgomery, Alabama	Shot	1
54	Ed Hartley (white)	October 20, 1922	Camden, Tennessee	Shot	1
55	George Hartley (white)	October 20, 1922	Camden, Tennessee	Shot	1
56	Elias V. Zarate	November 11, 1922	Weslaco, Texas	Shot	1
57	Cupid Dickson / Cubrit Dixon	December 5, 1922	Madison, Florida	Shot	1
58	Charles Wright	December 8 ,1922	Perry, Florida	Burned	1
59	Less Smith	December 9, 1922	Morrilton, Arkansas	Burned	1
60	George Gay	December 11, 1922	Streetman, Texas	Hanged	1
61	Arthur Young	December 11, 1922	Perry, Florida	Hanged	1
