= Timeline of Oklahoma City =

City history timeline

Coordinates: 35.482°N 97.535°W

The following is a timeline of the history of Oklahoma City, Oklahoma, US.

== Prior to 20th century ==
- 1887
  - February: A stop along the newly completed Southern Kansas Railway line was constructed and named "Oklahoma Station."
  - December 30: The United States Postal Service established a post office at Oklahoma Station.
- 1889
  - April 22: Settlement established on Unassigned Lands of the United States.
  - Oklahoma Times, Weekly Oklahoman, and Oklahoma Gazette newspapers begin publication.
- 1890
  - Town charted in Oklahoma Territory.
  - W.J. Gault becomes mayor.
  - Population: 4,151.
- 1896 – January: Statehood convention held.

== 20th century ==
=== 1900s–1940s ===
- 1901
  - Epworth University founded.
  - Douglass High School active (approximate date).
- 1902 – Oklahoma Historical Society headquartered in Oklahoma City.
- 1905 – Brock Dry Goods in business.
- 1906 – Oklahoma College for Young Women founded.
- 1907
  - Town becomes part of the new U.S. state of Oklahoma.
  - Population: 32,452.
  - Elmer L. Fulton becomes U.S. representative for Oklahoma's 2nd congressional district.
- 1908
  - Temple B’nai Israel synagogue built.
  - Dick Thompson Morgan becomes U.S. representative for Oklahoma's 2nd congressional district.
- 1909 – Colcord Building constructed.

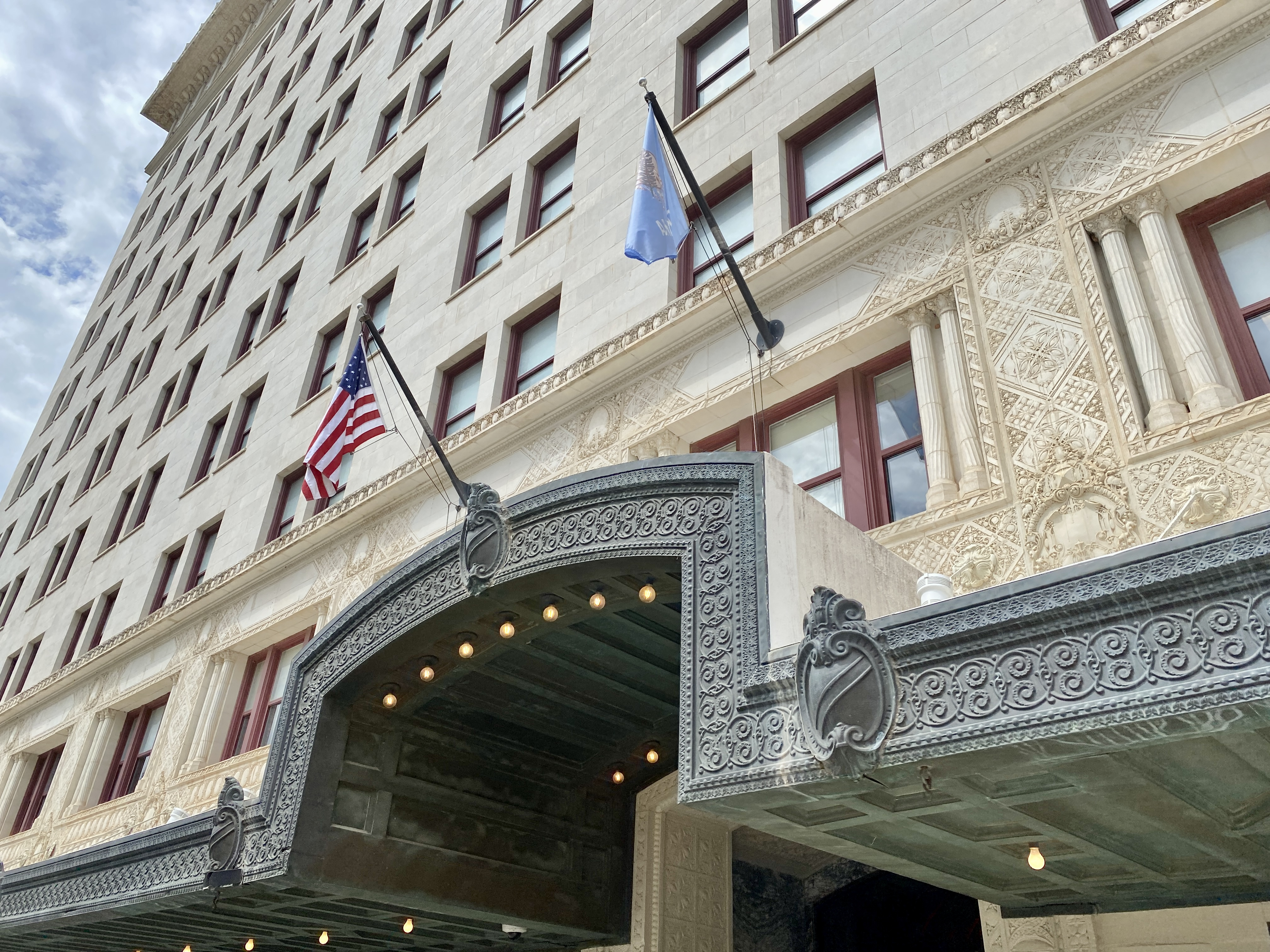
Built in 1909, The Colcord Hotel, Robinson Avenue and Sheridan Avenue, Oklahoma City, OK

- 1910
  - Oklahoma state capital relocated to Oklahoma City from Guthrie.
  - Cattlemen's Cafe in business.
  - Population: 64,205.
- 1911
  - Oklahoma City University established.
  - Skirvin Hotel in business.
- 1913 – Board of Health established.
- 1915 – Joseph Bryan Thompson becomes U.S. representative for Oklahoma's 5th congressional district.
- 1916
  - Black Dispatch newspaper begins publication.
  - Blackwood David Business College established.
- 1917 – Emanuel Synagogue active.
- 1918 – Cain's Coffee Building constructed.
- 1919
  - Lake Overholser reservoir and Oklahoma State Capitol built.
  - Aldridge Theater opens (approximate date).
  - John W. Harreld becomes U.S. representative for Oklahoma's 5th congressional district.
- 1920
  - WKY radio begins broadcasting.
  - Population: 91,295.
- 1921
  - Calvary Baptist Church built.
  - Fletcher B. Swank becomes U.S. representative for Oklahoma's 5th congressional district.
- 1922
  - Ritz Theater opens.
  - Lynching of Jake Brooks Photographs of Jake Brooks's hanged body are sent to Congress, hoping for passage of the Dyer Anti-Lynching Bill.
- 1923 – KOCY radio begins broadcasting.
- 1925 – Oklahoma City Blue Devils jazz band active.
- 1927 – New Quayle Methodist Episcopal Church built.
- 1928 – Oil discovered.
- 1929 – Ulysses S. Stone becomes U.S. representative for Oklahoma's 5th congressional district
- 1930 – Population: 185,389.
- 1931
  - Union Station opens.
  - First National Bank Building constructed.
  - Fletcher Swank becomes U.S. representative for Oklahoma's 5th congressional district again.
- 1934
  - Taft Stadium built.
  - Santa Fe Depot opens.
- 1935 – Joshua B. Lee becomes U.S. representative for Oklahoma's 5th congressional district.
- 1937
  - Daily Law Journal Record newspaper headquartered in city.
  - Robert P. Hill becomes U.S. representative for Oklahoma's 5th congressional district, succeeded by Gomer Griffith Smith.
- 1939 – Mike Monroney becomes U.S. representative for Oklahoma's 5th congressional district.
- 1940 – Population: 204,424.
- 1941 – U.S. military Tinker Air Force Base established.
- 1946 – Urban League established.

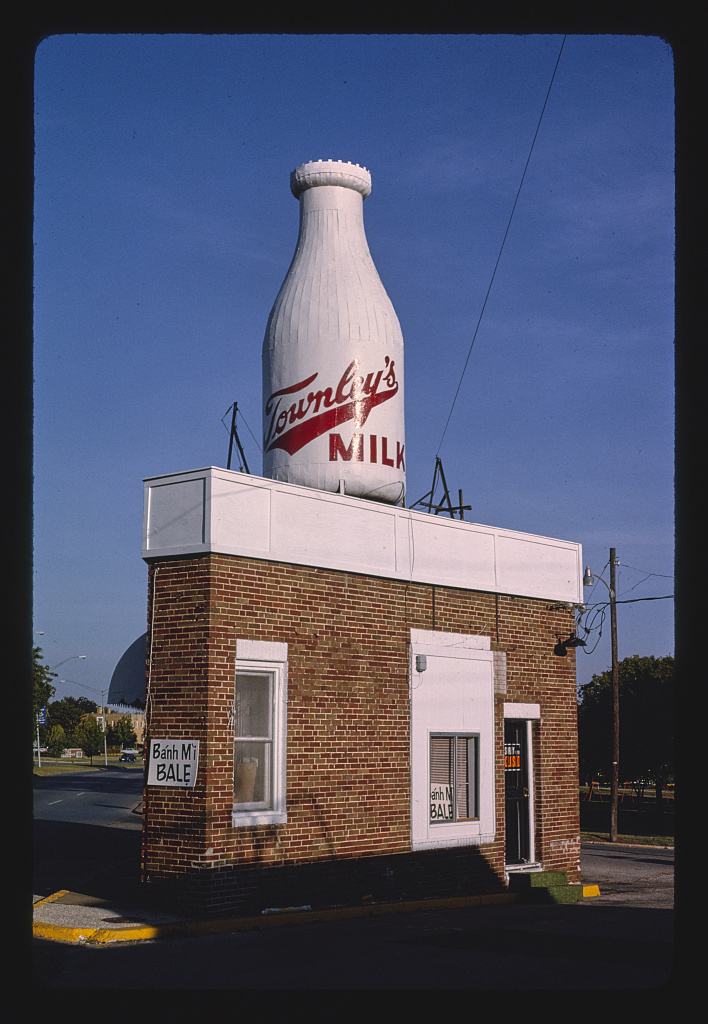
The building in 1993, when the milk bottle advertised Townley's Milk

- 1948 – Milk Bottle Grocery in business.
- 1949 – WKY-TV (television) begins broadcasting.

=== 1950s–1990s ===
- 1950
  - Circle Drive-In cinema opens.
  - Population: 243,504.
- 1951 – John Jarman becomes U.S. representative for Oklahoma's 5th congressional district.
- 1953 – KWTV (television) begins broadcasting.
- 1954 – Griffin Television Tower erected.
- 1955 – Cowboy Hall of Fame and Museum established.
- 1958 – Oklahoma City sit-ins led by Clara Luper for racial desegregation begin.
- 1960
  - Penn Square Mall in business.
  - Population: 324,253.
- 1962 – Oklahoma City 89ers baseball team formed.
- 1964
  - July: Oklahoma City sonic boom tests begin.
  - Founders Tower built.
- 1965
  - Central Business District redevelopment plan ("Pei plan") adopted.
  - Community Action Agency of Oklahoma City established.

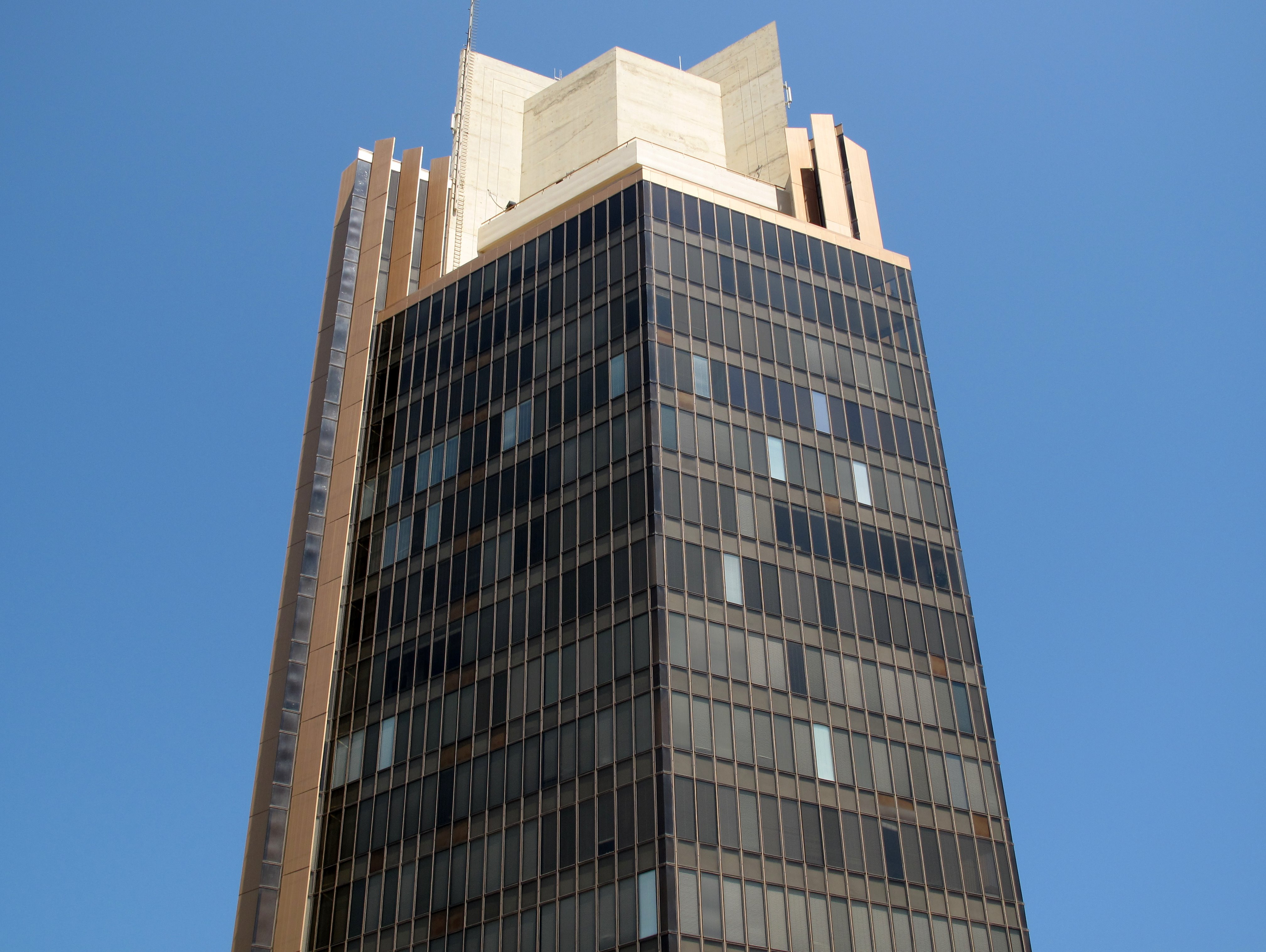
The Classen (originally Citizens Bank Tower) is a residential high-rise in the uptown section of Oklahoma City.

- 1966
  - Central Oklahoma Transportation and Parking Authority established.
  - The Classen (originally Citizens Bank Tower) is built. A residential high-rise in the uptown section of Oklahoma City, near the city's Paseo Arts District and Asian District. The tower has 21 floors and is 273 feet tall. It is currently the third tallest residential building in the city.
- 1968 – Harn Homestead and 1889ers Museum founded.
- 1969
  - August 19: Sanitation labor strike begins.
  - Oklahoma City Community Foundation established.
- 1970
  - Oklahoma Theater Center built.
  - Population: 366,481.
- 1971
  - University of Oklahoma Health Sciences Center active.
  - Patience Latting becomes mayor.
  - Chase Tower built.

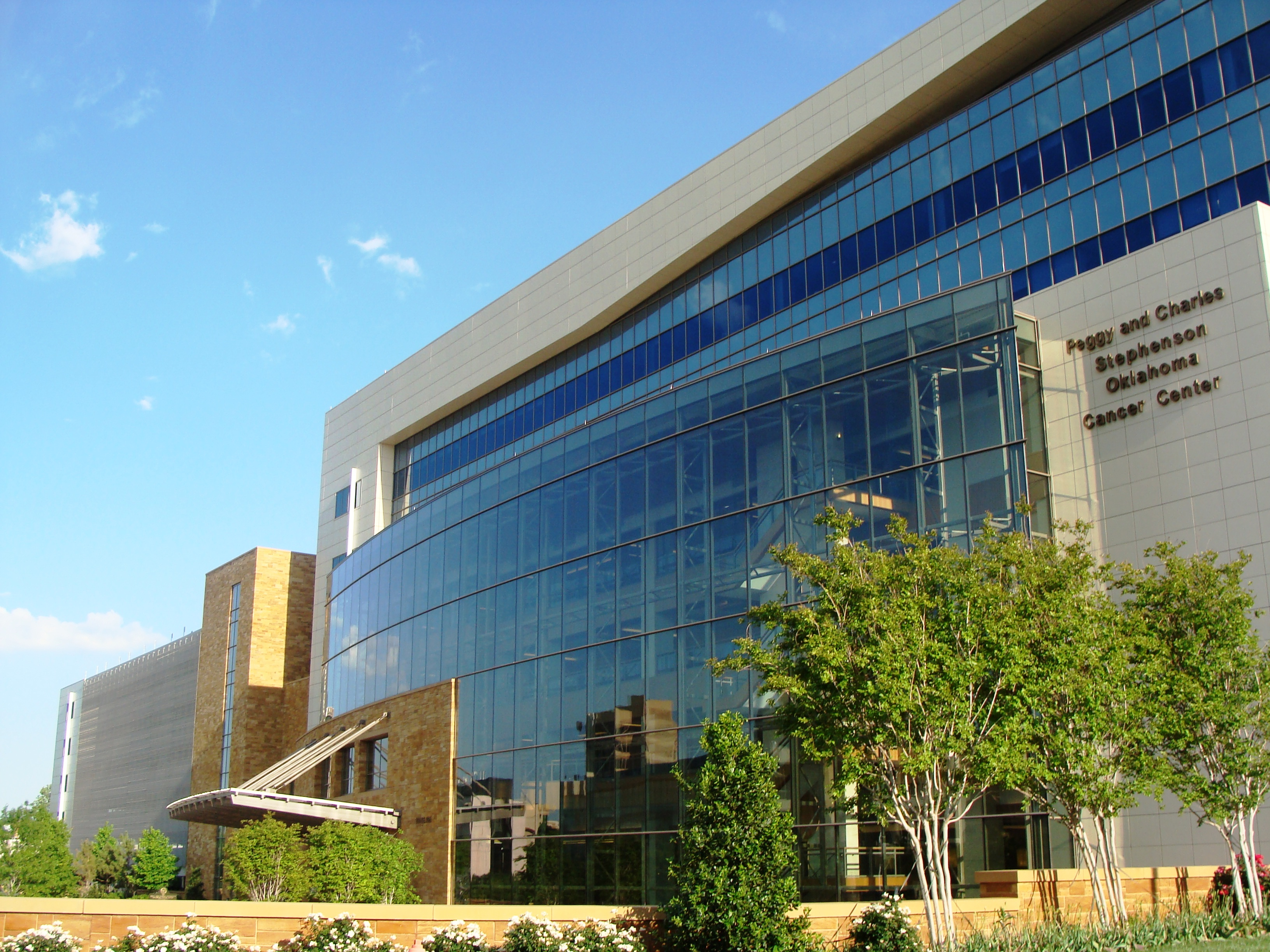
Stephenson Oklahoma Cancer Center on OUHSC Campus

- 1972
  - Premiere of Western film J. W. Coop.
  - Myriad Convention Center opens.
  - Henry Overholser historic site established.
- 1974 – Underground pedestrian concourse built.
- 1976 – 45th Infantry Division Museum established.
- 1977
  - Murrah Federal Building constructed.
  - Mickey Edwards becomes U.S. representative for Oklahoma's 5th congressional district.
- 1979 – Black Chronicle newspaper begins publication.
- 1980
  - Oklahoma City Food Bank organized.
  - Population: 403,213.
- 1983 – Andy Coats becomes mayor.
- 1984 – Oklahoma City Public Schools Foundation established.
- 1987
  - Grusendorf v. City of Oklahoma City smoking-related lawsuit decided.
  - Ron Norick becomes mayor.
- 1988
  - Oklahoma City Pride begins.
  - Myriad Botanical Gardens Tropical Conservatory opens.
- 1990 – Population: 444,719.
- 1993 – Ernest Istook becomes U.S. representative for Oklahoma's 5th congressional district.
- 1994 – Grateful Bean Cafe opens.
- 1995
  - April 19: Oklahoma City bombing.
  - City website online.
- 1999 – Kirk Humphreys becomes mayor.
- 2000 – Population: 506,132.

== 21st century ==
- 2001 – Oklahoma City National Memorial opens.
- 2002
  - Ford Center stadium opens.
  - Oklahoma City Lightning women's football team formed.
- 2003 – Guy Liebmann becomes mayor.
- 2004 – Mick Cornett becomes mayor.
- 2005 – Will Rogers World Airport's new terminal opens.
- 2006 – Douglass Mid-High School built.
- 2007 – Mary Fallin becomes U.S. representative for Oklahoma's 5th congressional district.

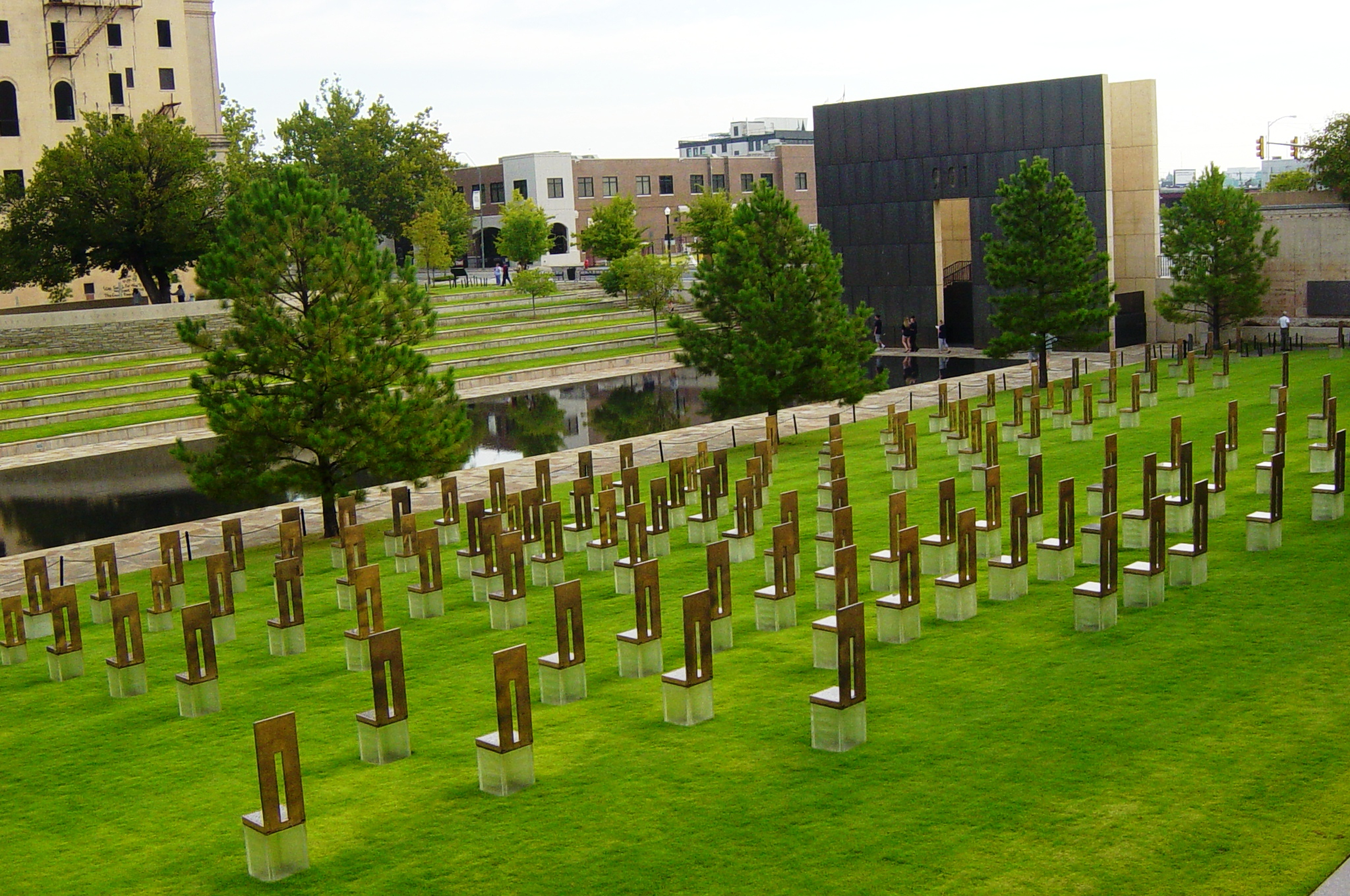
The Field of Empty Chairs, east Gate of Time, and Reflecting Pool at the Oklahoma City National Memorial. The Survivor Tree is visible in the upper left corner.

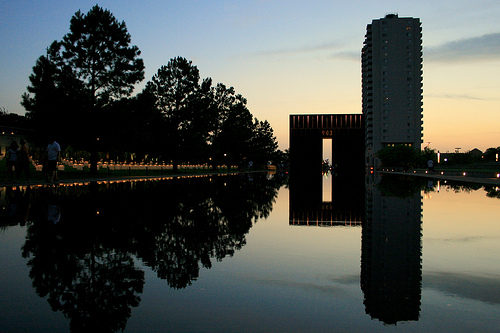
The Oklahoma City National Memorial as seen from the base of the reflecting pool

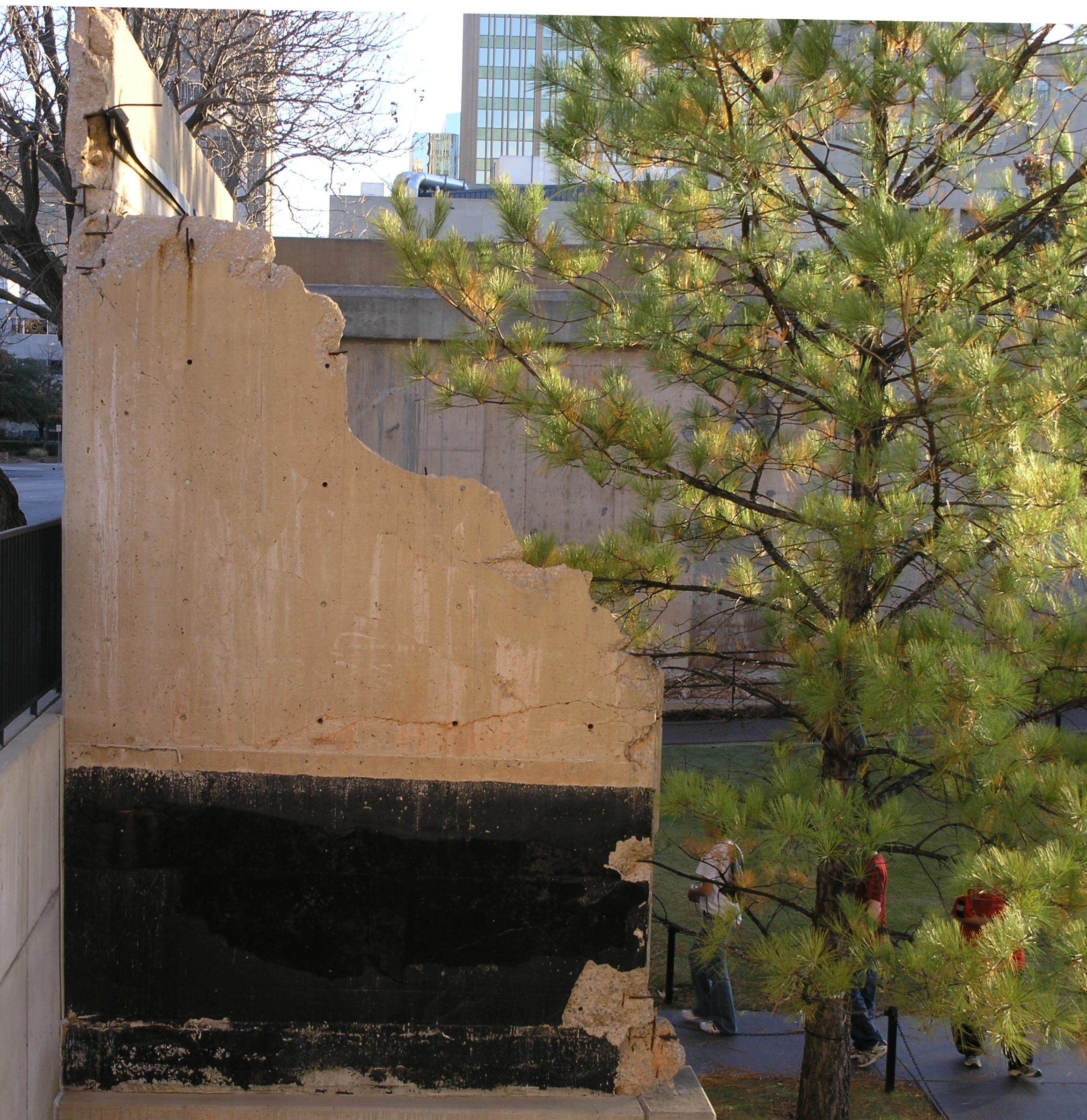
The Survivors' Wall is the only remaining part of the Murrah Building left standing, and forms part of the memorial complex.

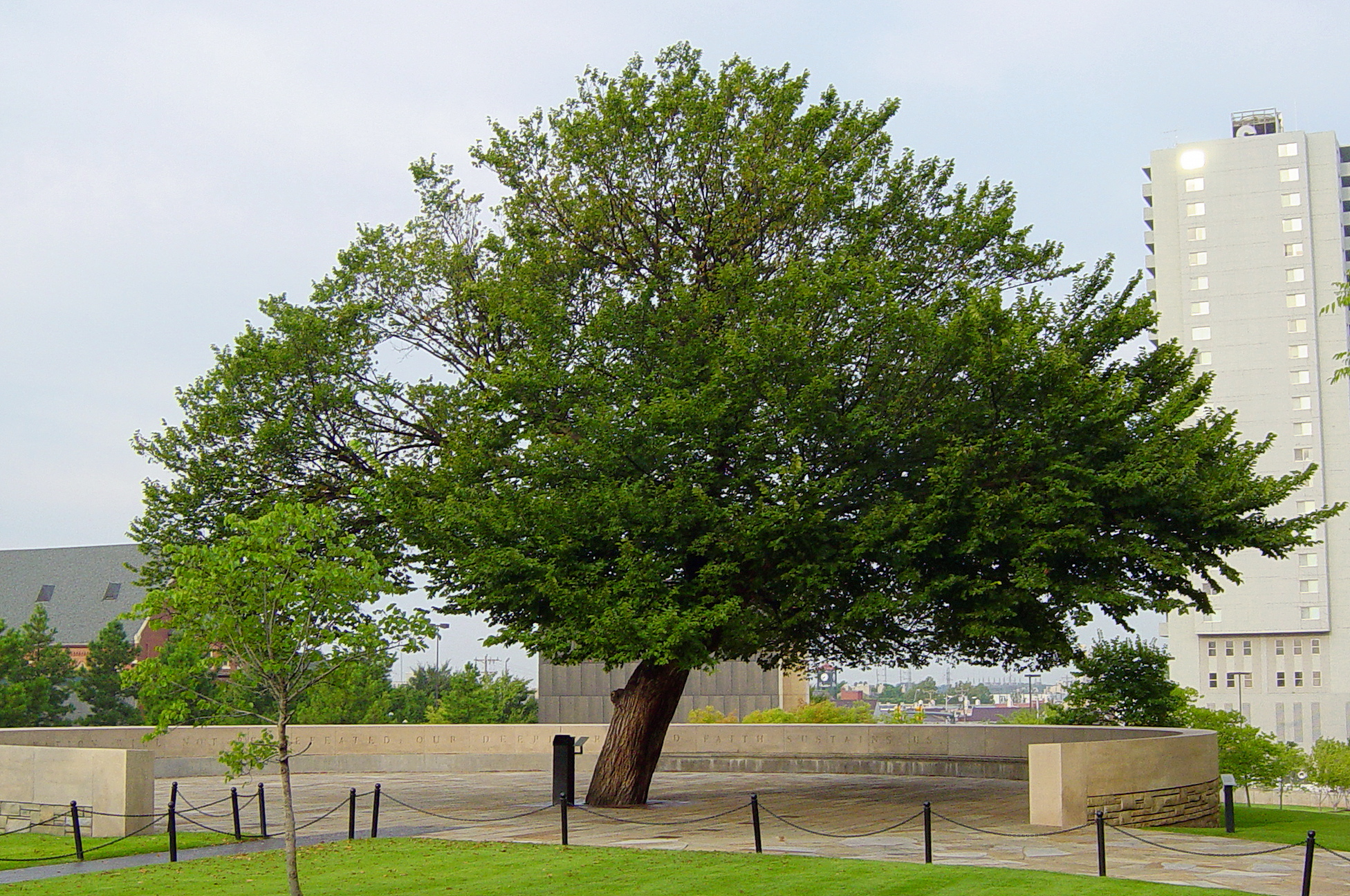
After surviving the bombing, the Survivor Tree became an emblem of the Memorial.

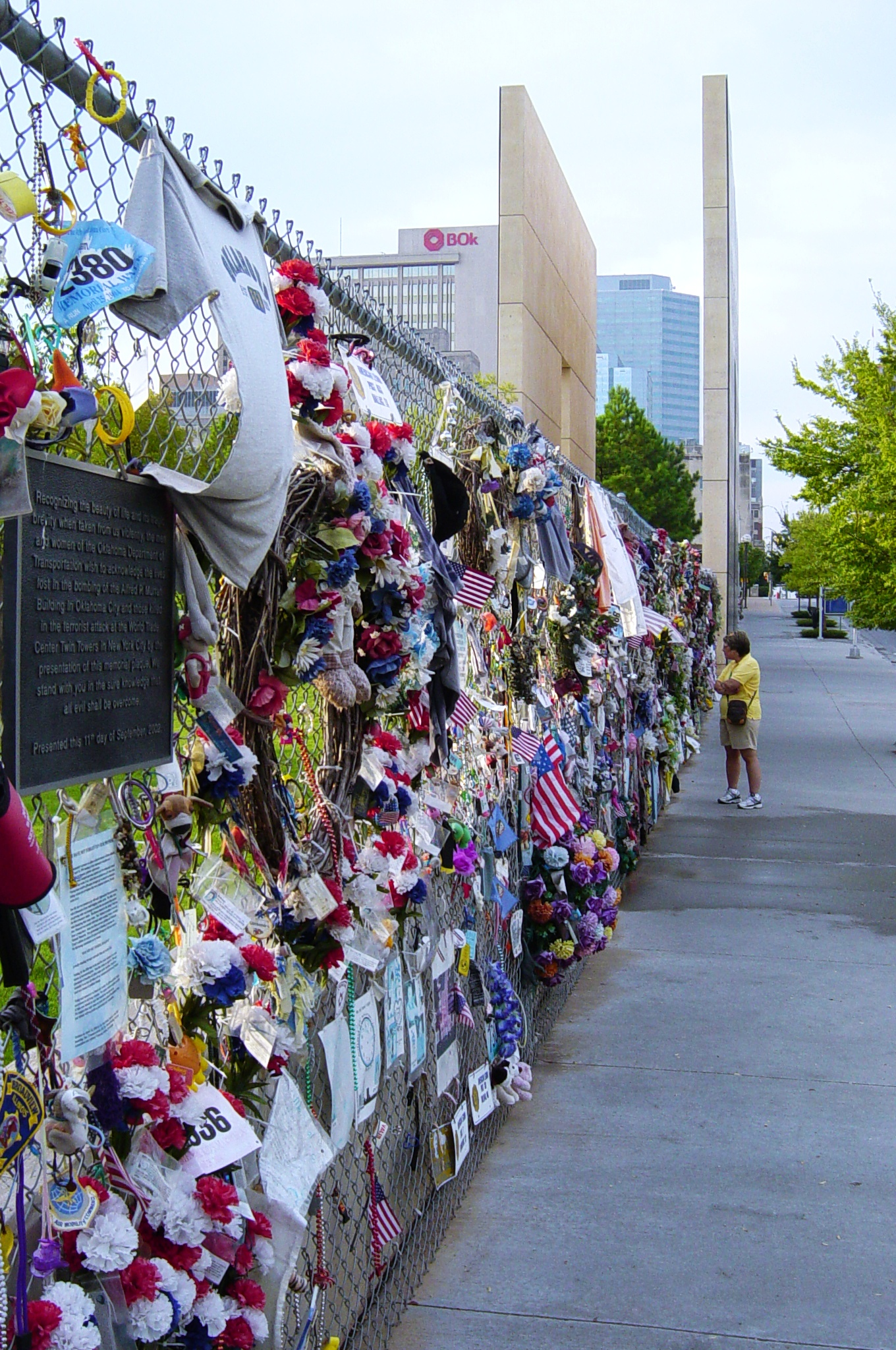
The Memorial Fence and east Gate of Time

- 2008 – Oklahoma City Thunder basketball team active.
- 2010
  - Oklahoma City Barons ice hockey team active.
  - Population: 579,999.
- 2011 – James Lankford becomes U.S. representative for Oklahoma's 5th congressional district.
- 2012 – Devon Tower built.
- 2014 – Municipal Archives established.
- 2015 – Steve Russell becomes U.S. representative for Oklahoma's 5th congressional district.
- 2018 – Oklahoma City Streetcar opens.

== See also ==
- History of Oklahoma City
- List of mayors of Oklahoma City
- National Register of Historic Places listings in Oklahoma County, Oklahoma
- Timelines of other cities in Oklahoma: Norman, Tulsa

== Bibliography ==
- "Five members of Lynching party - three white and two black, caught tried and sentenced to life imprisonment within 5 days". The Dallas Express. Dallas, Texas: W.E. King. February 4, 1922. pp. 1–8. ISSN 2331-334X. OCLC 9839625.
- "Oklahoma City". Polk's Oklahoma Gazetteer and Business Directory. Chicago: R.L. Polk & Co. 1902.
- "Oklahoma City" . Encyclopædia Britannica. Vol. 20 (11th ed.). 1910. p. 61.
- W. F. Kerr (1922), The Story of Oklahoma City, Oklahoma, Chicago: S.J. Clarke + v.2–3
- Angelo C. Scott, The Story of Oklahoma City (Oklahoma City, Okla.: Times-Journal Publishing Co., 1939).
- Negro City Directory, Oklahoma City Negro Chamber of Commerce, 1941
- Federal Writers' Project (1941), "Oklahoma City", Oklahoma: A Guide to the Sooner State, American Guide Series, Norman: University of Oklahoma Press
- Study of the Social and Economic Conditions of the Negro Population of Oklahoma City, New York: National Urban League, 1945
- Roy P. Stewart, Born Grown: An Oklahoma City History (Oklahoma City, Okla.: Fidelity Bank, 1974).
- Pendleton Woods, "Oklahoma City Metropolitan Area," in Cities of Oklahoma, ed. John W. Morris (Oklahoma City: Oklahoma Historical Society, 1979).
- Ory Mazar Nergal, ed. (1980), "Oklahoma City, OK", Encyclopedia of American Cities, New York: E.P. Dutton, p. 247+, OL 4120668M
- Odie B. Faulk, Laura E. Faulk, and Bob L. Blackburn, Oklahoma City: A Centennial Portrait (Northridge, Calif.: Windsor Publications, 1988).
- Susan Wallace and Tamara J. Hermen, Oklahoma City: A Better Living, A Better Life (Montgomery, Ala.: Community Communications, 1997).
- "Great Plains: Oklahoma: Oklahoma City", USA, Let's Go, New York: St. Martin's Press, 1999, OL 24937240M
- "Lynchers Jailed For Life.; Five Sentenced in Oklahoma for Slaying Packing House Worker". New York Times. January 25, 1922. ISSN 1553-8095. OCLC 1645522.
- "Oklahoma City, Oklahoma", National Geographic Magazine, vol. 203, Washington DC, 2003
- David J. Wishart, ed. (2004). "Cities and Towns: Oklahoma City, Oklahoma". Encyclopedia of the Great Plains. University of Nebraska Press. ISBN 0-8032-4787-7.
- Douglas Henry Daniels (2007). One O'Clock Jump: The Unforgettable History of the Oklahoma City Blue Devils. Beacon Press. ISBN 978-0-8070-7137-3.
- Linda D. Wilson (2007). "Oklahoma City". Encyclopedia of Oklahoma History & Culture. Oklahoma Historical Society and Oklahoma State University Library Electronic Publishing Center. Archived from the original on May 25, 2011.
