= National Conference on Lynching =

Event in 1919

The National Conference on Lynching took place in Carnegie Hall, New York City, May 5–6, 1919. The goal of the conference was to pressure Congress to pass the Dyer Anti-Lynching Bill, sponsored by Leonidas Dyer (R-MO). It was a project of the National Association for the Advancement of Colored People (NAACP), founded in 1909. Recently the group had been working to publicize and try to end the continued lynchings, mostly of black men. In April they released a report, Thirty Years of Lynching in the United States, 1889-1918. The late 19th and early 20th century years were the nadir of race relations, with high rates of violence against blacks, especially in the South, where white Democrat-dominated legislatures had also disenfranchised African Americans during this period, excluding them from the political system.

The keynote speaker of the conference was Charles Evans Hughes, former Republican governor of New York and Secretary of State, Supreme Court Justice, and failed candidate for president in the 1916 presidential election. "Hughes told the crowd that black soldiers who demonstrated bravery, honor, and loyalty in Europe [note: during World War I] deserved equal protection under the law back home." He and other Republicans did not support racial equality, but equal protection under the law. "His remark were directed, in part, at his political nemesis President Wilson," a Southerner and segregationist, who had established segregation in federal offices in the capital. Lengthy quotes from Hughes's speech appeared in The New York Times (on page 15).

General John H. Sherburne, commander of the Colored 167th Artillery Brigade (as it was then known) of the 92nd Division, described the valor of the Negro artillerymen under his command.

The only African American to address the crowd was James Weldon Johnson, Field Secretary of the NAACP. "Johnson worked to make attending whites... so uncomfortable that they would press political leaders for a federal anti-lynching law." Other speakers were the suffragist Dr. Anna Howard Shaw, who portrayed women's suffrage as a means to attack lynching, and Emmet O'Neal, former Governor of Alabama, who spoke on a governor's responsibility to ensure that local law enforcement carried out the laws, to protect negroes as well as whites.

The conference was immediately followed, that same day in Carnegie Hall, by a "mass meeting" of the Society for Ethical Culture, at which NAACP President Moorfield Storey, organizer of the lynching conference, was the featured speaker.

The conference had only limited influence, as it was mostly preaching to the choir, addressing an audience that already supported its goals. It did not enjoy as much national publicity as its organizers hoped it would. But it did encourage African Americans to organize to gain equal justice under the law: NAACP membership grew greatly. In January 1918 the NAACP had 9,200 members; by May 1919 it had more than 62,000.

That summer is known as Red Summer because of the racial violence that broke out in numerous major cities across the country. There had been a buildup of social and economic tensions after the war; the government had no way to re-integrate veterans into the economy. There was much competition for work and for housing in those cities that were booming with new industries. Riots broke out of whites attacking blacks, in Omaha, Chicago, Washington, DC, and other cities, but for the first time blacks consistently fought back.

The Dyer Bill passed the House in January 1922, but it never succeeded in surmounting the block of a Southern filibuster in the Senate. Given the black disenfranchisement in the South achieved by most former Confederacy legislatures, it was a one-party region. The white Democrats who were elected from the region had outsize influence, as their seats were based on the total population, not just white voters. They constituted the Solid South or Southern bloc in Congress. Because committee chairmanships were based on seniority, and only white Democratic Party candidates were elected in the South, many attained seniority and directed numerous important committees. It was not until December 2018 that the Senate passed (unanimously) legislation prohibiting lynching, the Justice for Victims of Lynching Act. But the House of Representatives took no action, and the bill died.
