= History of Oklahoma City =

Overview of the state capital

The history of Oklahoma City refers to the history of Oklahoma City, and the land on which it developed. Oklahoma City's history begins with the settlement of "unassigned lands" in the region in the 1880s, and continues with the city's development through statehood, World War I and the Oklahoma City bombing.

== Pre-settlement ==
Prior to the Land Rush of 1889, the territory Oklahoma City fell under was known as the "Unassigned Lands", which were located just north of the Chickasaw Nation, and covered roughly 2950 square miles in central Oklahoma. The term "Unassigned lands" was first coined in 1879 by Elias C. Boudinot, a mixed-blood Cherokee Journalist, who believed that the territory should be open to white settlers.

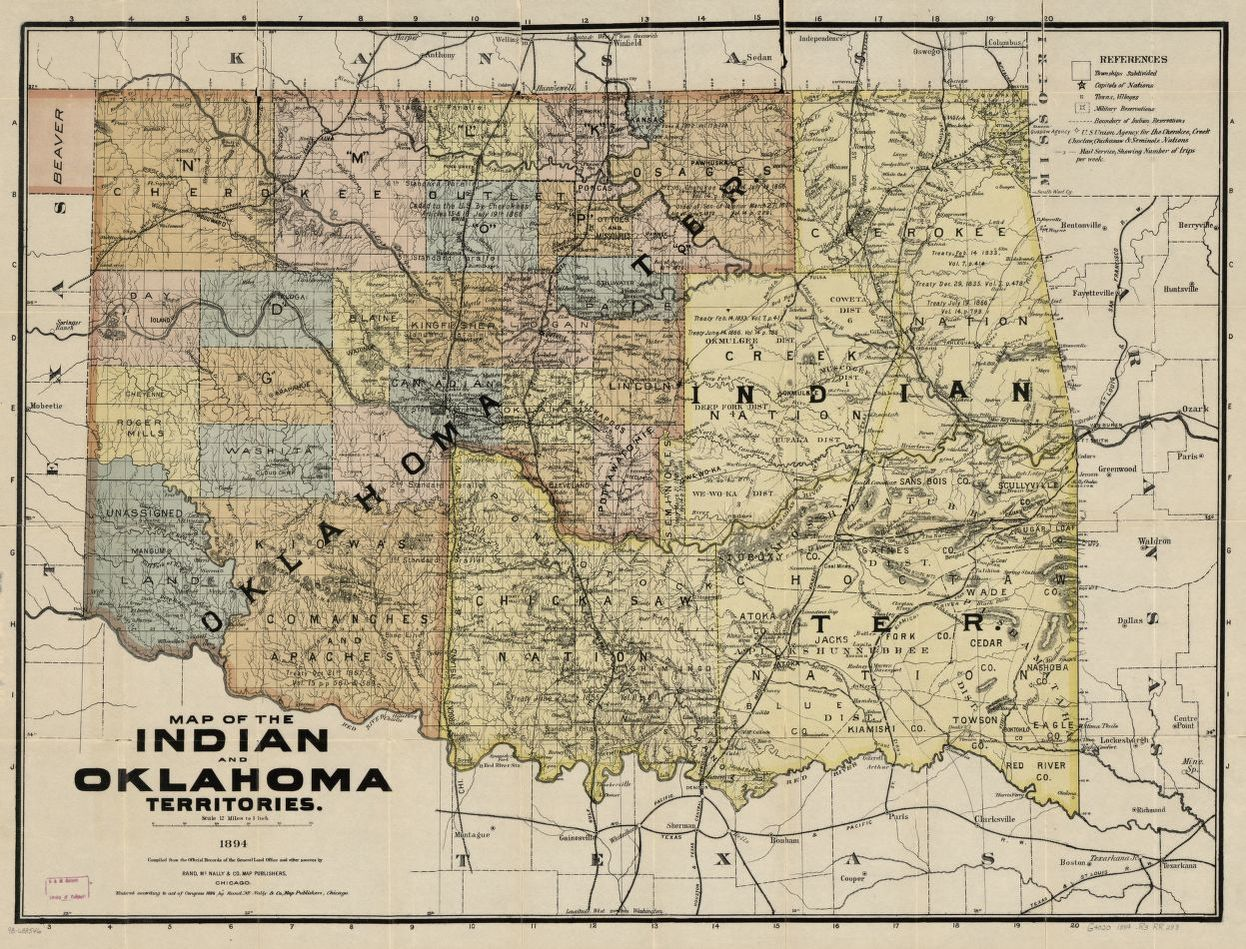
Map of Indian Territory in Oklahoma Circa 1894, Library of Congress Maps and Geography division

This territory of Oklahoma was not inhabited by any of the displaced indigenous tribes from the Indian Removal Act of 1830 and was located in central Oklahoma, surrounded by the other claimed indigenous territories. The Cherokee Nation fell to the north, bound by the Cherokee Outlet. On the east, the Potawatomi, Shawnee, Sac and Fox, Pawnee, and Iowa reservations resided. Just south of the Unassigned lands, the Chickasaw Nation fell, and the Cheyenne Arapaho settlement fell to the west. The lands were crossed by five rivers, including "the Canadian, the North Canadian, the Cimarron, the Deep Fork, and the Little", which provided natural borders, and a perfect combination of thin topsoil for grazing cattle, and rich bottomland soil for raising crops, thus making it greatly desired by white settlers who wanted to stake their claims to the inexpensive lands.

Prior to the opening of these Indigenous territories, the Boomer Movement saw forced raids and staked claims at sites in the unassigned lands, such as in present day Oklahoma City and Stillwater from 1879 to 1888. These raids, publicly led by David L. Payne and William Couch only saw brief success, and settled a town known as Ewing, present day Oklahoma City, in 1880. Despite this, such attempts were constantly overthrown and nearly all were escorted out of the lands by U.S troops. However, Boomers continued to attempt illegal settlements in the Unassigned Lands and in the surrounding settlements until the Land Rush of 1889.

== Early history (1889-1917) ==
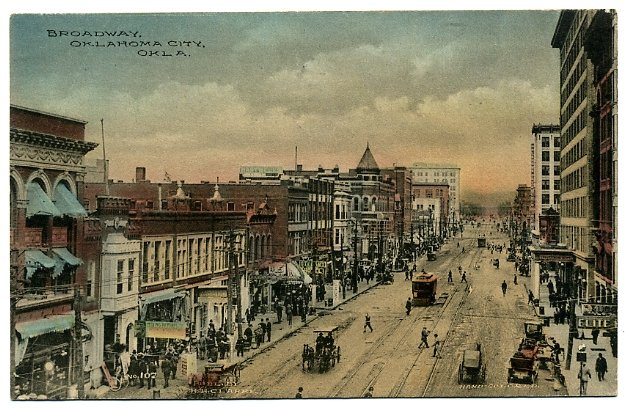
Broadway, about 1910

Oklahoma City was officially opened to the public for settlement on April 22, 1889 with the Land Run causing substantial settlement growth seemingly overnight. Oklahoma City was put under a provisional government, as the federal government had not expected the need to establish laws in the new territories, until the Organic Act that was passed under the Harrison Administration on May 2, 1890. This act applied the laws that were put in place for Nebraska to the newly settled Oklahoma Territory as a place holder until local governments could establish legislation. Oklahoma City was officially incorporated as the county seat for the second of the seven Oklahoma counties, with Guthrie, Oklahoma as the capital.

The first provisional Mayor of Oklahoma City was William Couch, one of the leaders of the previous Boomer movement, who resigned in 1889. Couch passed the title on to Sidney Clarke on November 11, 1889 with his resignation. Clarke held the title of provisional mayor of Oklahoma City until an official election could be held on November 27, 1889, making Andrew Jackson Beale the mayor until the first nonprovisional mayor, William James Gault, was elected in 1890.

Tensions began to rise between Guthrie, Oklahoma and Oklahoma City as high profile Oklahoman politicians, including Governor Charles N. Haskell, advocated for Oklahoma City to receive the title of state capital instead. The rivalry continued until, by popular vote, Oklahoma City was made the official capital on June 11, 1910. Speculations among Guthrie civic leaders claimed that an unknown Oklahoma City booster allegedly spirited the state seal away from the Guthrie capital in the night to ensure the title transfer. Oklahoma City continues to hold the title of Oklahoma's Capital to the present day, with the Oklahoma State Capitol building established at N.E 23rd street and Lincoln Boulevard in 1917.

=== City leaders ===
City leaders of this new capital included John Wilford Shartel, Anton H. Classen, James W. Maney, and Henry Overholser, who vastly transformed the infrastructure of the city, by providing better housing accommodations, efficient public transportation, public entertainment, and a railroad system. These city leaders set the blueprint for the upcoming economic development in later decades.

Overholser was a prominent early settler who emphasized his desire for public entertainment with his contributions to the city's infrastructure. Overholser created the Grand Avenue Hotel in 1889, the Overholser Opera House along with the Overholser theater in 1890, and assisted in the purchase of permanent fair grounds for the Oklahoma State Fair in 1906.

Classen, prior to creating the Metropolitan Railway Company with John Shartel (later the Oklahoma City Railway Company), was appointed as receiver in the U.S land office in Oklahoma City by president William McKinley in 1897. Classen focused his efforts on inner-city beautification and infrastructure improvements, becoming president of both the Oklahoma City Building and Loan Association and the Oklahoma City Commercial Club in 1899.

Classen worked closely with Shartel to add numerous housing divisions to accommodate the growing population, the first being the Highland Parks Addition in 1900. Along with this, "he was instrumental in getting city streets paved, in organizing Oklahoma City street fairs, and in promoting Oklahoma City as the location for Theodore Roosevelt's Rough Riders annual reunion in 1900". Shartel and Classen collaborated once again in 1902 with the creation of the Metropolitan Railroad Company, which created an efficient mass-transport system for downtown Oklahoma City. Classen was also responsible for organizing the University Development Company, and financed Epworth University (Now known as Oklahoma City University) which was officially established in 1904.

Aside from his collaborations with Anton Classen, John Shartel bought twenty acres of land located at modern day 7th and 10th street, which became known as the Florence Addition. Prior to Classen's death in 1922, Shartel served as the Vice President on the Oklahoma City Building and Loan Association and the Oklahoma City Commercial Club, and overtook the position of president after Classen's death.

James W. Maney also focused his efforts on creating a railroad system in Oklahoma City, and gained the reputation of "the largest railroad contractor in Oklahoma" by 1900. Maney built the second railroad into Oklahoma City, when the territory opened in 1889, and then worked closely with Classen and Olverhoser to focus on the growth and development in Oklahoma City. Maney's legacy is sealed by the historic Maney House, the mansion he resided in until is death in 1945, that is now used as a bed and breakfast.

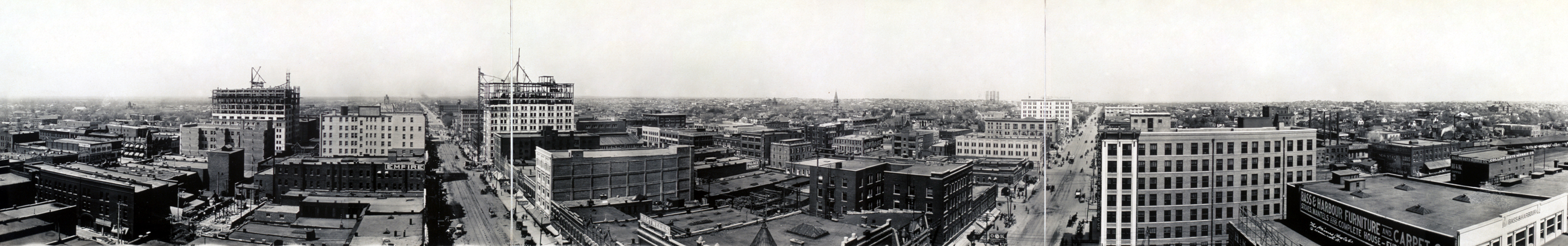
A 1910 panoramic view of Oklahoma City

== Pre World War II ==
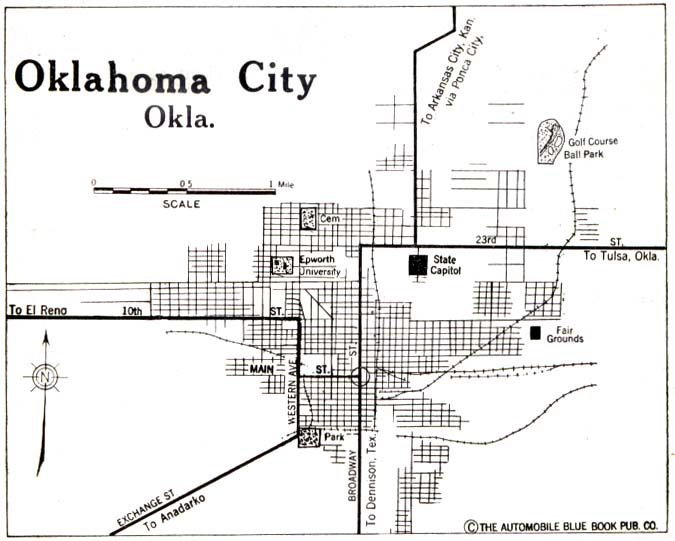
Map of Oklahoma City in 1920

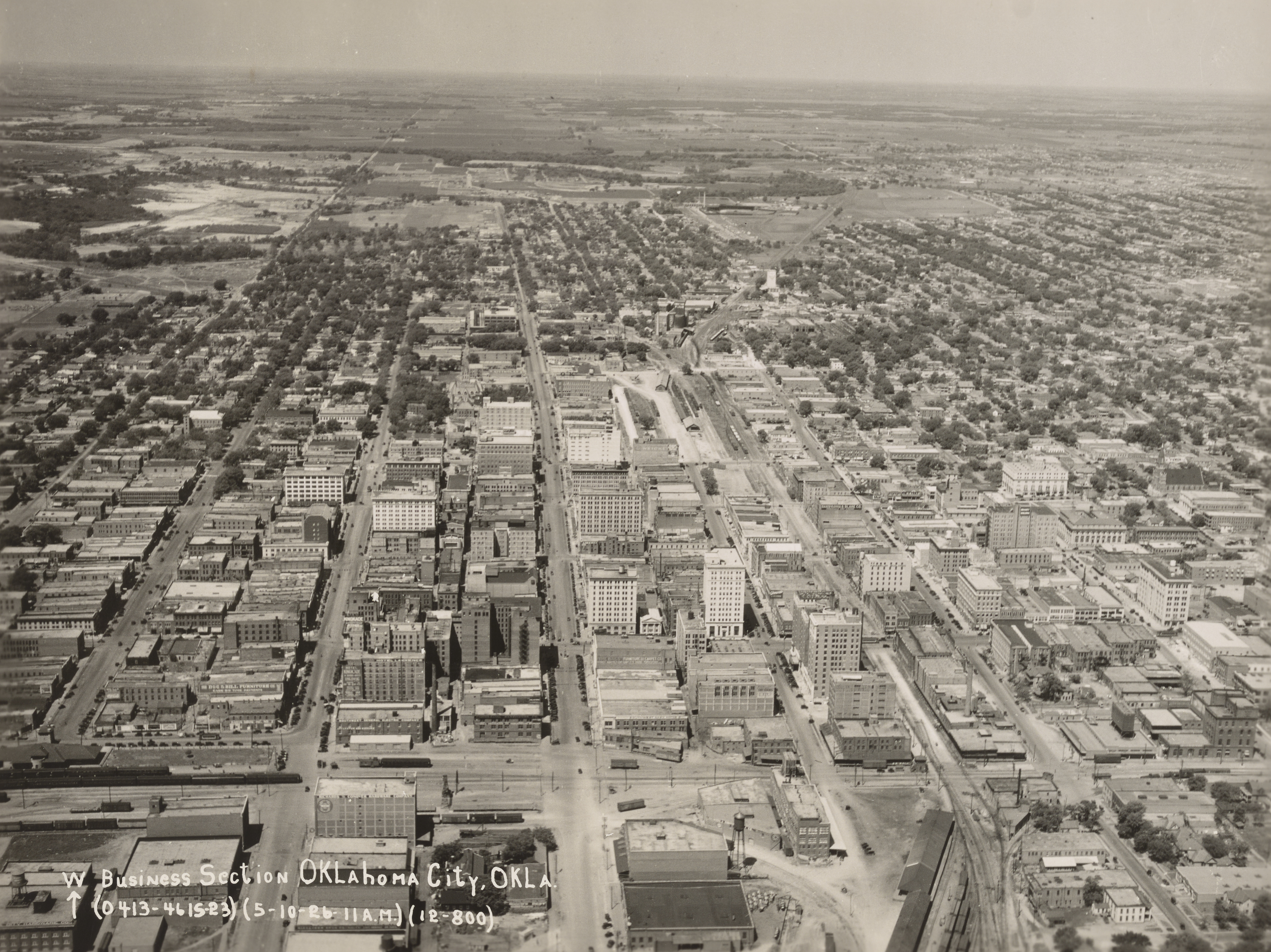
Aerial view of Oklahoma City in 1926

The new city continued to grow at a steady rate until December 4, 1928, when oil was discovered in the city. Oil wells popped up everywhere, even on the south lawn on the capitol building, and the sudden influx of oil money within the city and throughout the state greatly accelerated the city's growth. While those who had made money during this early oil boom largely escaped the Depression, the majority of Americans and Oklahomans were not so lucky. By 1935, rural migrants and unemployed workers had built a massive shanty town (or "Hooverville" after president Herbert Hoover) on the south bank of the North Canadian River. The river often flooded, bringing disease and misery to the people living there. As part of the "New Deal", the Works Progress Administration and Civilian Conservation Corps greatly reduced the level of the river to prevent flooding (a move which would later become a problem for city leaders stuck with a nearly empty river) and built one of the first experiments with public housing in the country.

A municipal-owned Elm Grove camp built in 1932 and which offered better amenities to residents who paid $1 a day or donated eight hours or labor. The camp was eliminated in 1933 because of a fear that it would attract more homeless residents to the city. In 1933, the city planning commission recommended a policy restricting African Americans' ability to stay in white residential areas within the city (see sundown town). A May Avenue Camp continued to exist in 1939.

== Postwar developments ==
The Second World War and the growing war industries brought recovery to the nation and Oklahoma City, and the post war period saw Oklahoma City become a major hub in the national Interstate Highway System. Additionally, Tinker Air Force Base in Midwest City became the largest air depot in the country in the post war period, a fact which made Oklahoma City the likely target for a possible Soviet nuclear strike. As the civil rights era dawned, downtown Oklahoma City became the site of a revolution in civil rights tactics. History teacher Clara Luper and some of her students from nearby Douglass High School led the first "sit-in" in American history to desegregate the lunch counter at a downtown department store in 1958. When they succeeded, the tactic was adopted throughout the country, notably by the young activists of SNCC.

With the support of Stanley Draper and the Oklahoma City Chamber of Commerce, the city government launched a "Great Annexation Drive" in 1959, quintupling Oklahoma City's legal boundaries from 80 square miles (210 km^{2}) to 433 square miles (1,120 km^{2}) in just over two years. Draper was concerned that Oklahoma City's peripheral cities and towns might block future urban developments and dominate city facilities, hampering long-range planning. He believed that annexation would allow the city to grow to provide the facilities industry required but which the surrounding communities did not have the resources to support. By the end of 1961, Oklahoma City had overtaken Los Angeles as the largest U.S. city by land mass. The annexation policy led to ballooning costs for services such as fire and police departments, roads, and lighting. In a 1965 special election, the Oklahoma City voters approved a sales tax by a margin of more than 2-1 to raise funds for expanding services.

From February 3 to July 29, 1964, Oklahoma City was subjected to eight sonic booms per day in a controversial experiment known as the Oklahoma City sonic boom tests. The intent was to quantify the sociological and economic costs of a supersonic transport aircraft. The experiment resulted in 15,400 damage claims. The persistence of the experiment and the 94% rejection rate of damage claims led to turmoil at all levels of government and embroiled Senator Mike Monroney's office in a battle with the Federal Aviation Administration. The embarrassment over the Oklahoma City experiments partially contributed to the demise of the Boeing 2707 SST project seven years later.

== Decline and stagnation ==
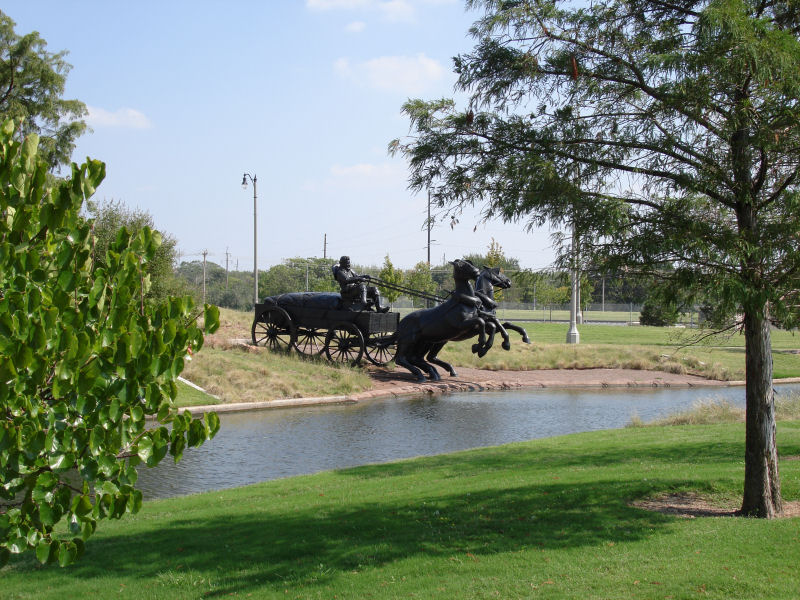
Bricktown Canal Landrun Statues.

As the 1960s continued, however, Oklahoma City began to decline. By 1970, "white flight" and suburbanization had drained the life from the central business district and the surrounding areas. The oil beneath the city had begun to dry up, and property values declined. The city leaders then engaged in a disastrous program of "urban renewal" which succeeded primarily in demolishing much of the aging theater district. Despite popular conjecture, the impressive Biltmore Hotel was not originally targeted to be taken down by the Oklahoma City Urban Renewal Authority. Plans drawn up for downtown's redevelopment by I.M. Pei always assumed the building would remain open for business. After a $3 million renovation in the mid-1960s, the hotel was renamed the Sheraton-Oklahoma Hotel. But, the operation could not turn a profit, and in 1973, hotel owners agreed with the authority the building had outlived its useful life and needed to be demolished. The city had planned to build a massive shopping mall called "The Galleria" downtown, but money for renewal ran out before they could construct more than the parking garage for it. This left downtown Oklahoma City in even worse shape than it had been in, with vacant lots where Victorian brownstones once stood. The 1970s and 1980s were periods of stagnation for Oklahoma City proper (and was the case for almost all major cities in the United States) and periods of affluence and explosive development for the suburbs. With the exception of The Myriad Gardens, little was done to improve the inner city or the central business district during this time, even as the oil boom of the late 1970s brought a flood of money into the area.

== 1990s ==
By 1992, the city was in such dire need of improvement that it was losing jobs, population, and even air carriers to more attractive cities. With this in mind, Mayor Ron Norick pushed through a massive plan for capital improvements throughout downtown called the Metropolitan Area Projects Plan, or MAPS. MAPS called for a five-year, one-cent sales tax to fund a new ballpark, a canal through Bricktown, a new central library, a large indoor arena, renovations to the fairgrounds and the civic center, and a series of low water dams on the North Canadian River to make it attractive and accessible to small boats. Though still stinging from the failure of "urban renewal", the people of Oklahoma City passed the measure, eventually raising over 1 billion dollars for improvements to the city and bringing life back to the central city.

=== Oklahoma City bombing ===
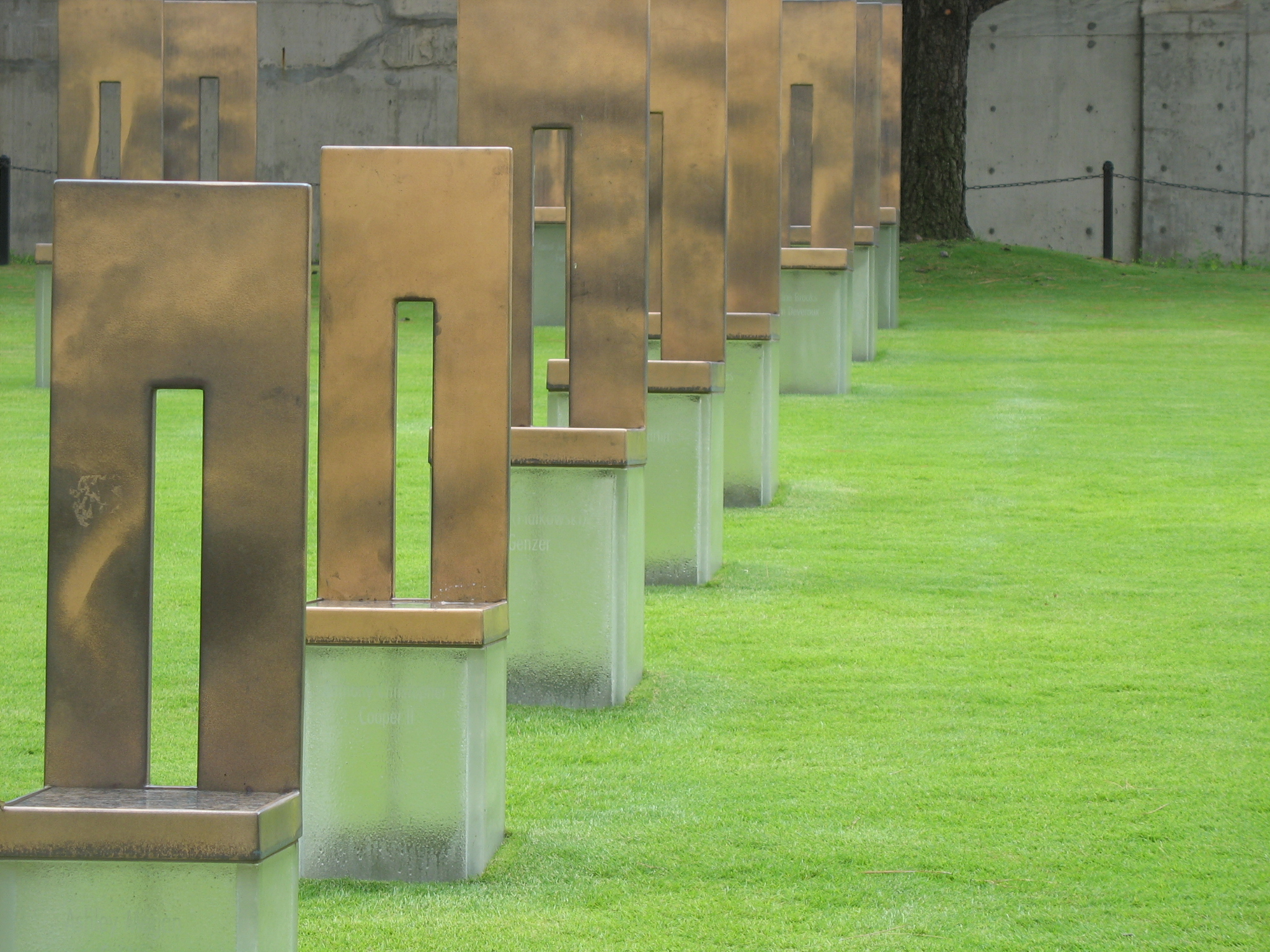
At the Oklahoma City National Memorial.

In the midst of this atmosphere of optimism and change, Timothy McVeigh drove a rented truck full of explosives to the Alfred P. Murrah Federal Building in downtown Oklahoma City on April 19, 1995. The explosion killed 168 people (including 19 children) and injured more than 680, as well as damaging and destroying many surrounding buildings. Until the attacks of September 11, it was the largest terrorist attack on American soil, and it remains the single largest domestic terrorist attack in American history.

The site is now home to the Oklahoma City National Memorial. The memorial was designed by Oklahoma City architects Hans and Torrey Butzer, and Sven Berg and was dedicated by President Clinton on April 19, 2000, exactly five years after the bombing. Oklahoma City has since rebuilt, and except for the memorial, there is little evidence of the bombing.

The Federal Bureau of Investigation led an investigation, known as OKBOMB, the largest criminal case in America's history (FBI agents conducted 28,000 interviews, amassed 3.5 short tons (3.2 t) of evidence, and collected nearly one billion pieces of information). Special Agent in Charge Weldon L. Kennedy. commanded the largest crime task force since the investigation into the assassination of John F. Kennedy. The task force included 300 FBI agents, 200 officers from the Oklahoma City Police Department, 125 members of the Oklahoma National Guard, and 55 officers from the Oklahoma Department of Public Safety.

== 21st Century ==
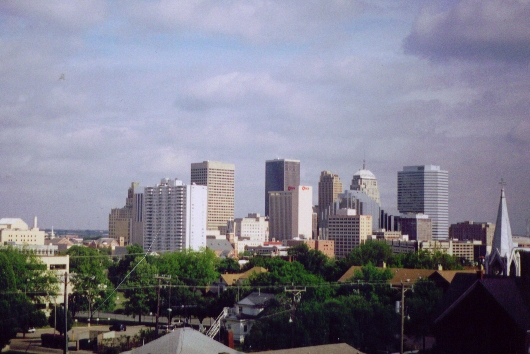
Oklahoma City skyline, 2005.

As Oklahoma City moves through the 21st century, new changes continue to bring population, jobs, entertainment, and improvement. In 2004, a new Dell call center brought over 250 jobs, and plans to employ over 19,000 more jobs in the future. 2005 brought Oklahoma its first major league basketball franchise, the New Orleans/Oklahoma City Hornets, followed by becoming the permanent home of the renamed Seattle NBA franchise, now the Oklahoma City Thunder, in 2008. Many other corporations are making Oklahoma City their home and the population is once again increasing at a very high rate. Also, a new addition to the downtown skyline, Devon Energy Center, was completed in 2012, with 52 stories and a height of 850 feet.

== See also ==
- Oklahoma City
- Timeline of Oklahoma City
- Oklahoma
