= Timeline of Norman, Oklahoma =

Flag of Norman, Oklahoma

The following is a timeline of the history of the city of Norman, Oklahoma, United States.

== Prior to 20th century ==
- 1889 – Norman Transcript newspaper begins publication.
- 1890
  - Norman designated seat of newly created Cleveland County.
  - High Gate College established.
  - Population: 787.
- 1891
  - City of Norman incorporated.
  - Remains from Norman's first cemetery (public school property on the SW corner of Main Street and Berry Road) moved to the I.O.O.F. Norman Cemetery.
- 1892 – University of Oklahoma opens.
- 1893 – Griffin Memorial Hospital established.
- 1895 – Central State Hospital established.
- 1899 – University's Natural History Museum established.
- 1900 – University's School of Geology founded.

== 20th century ==
- 1907 – Norman becomes part of the new U.S. state of Oklahoma.
- 1909 – Norman Depot built.
- 1913 – Oklahoma Railway Company interurban train begins operating.
- 1915 – Oklahoma State Asylum active.
- 1918 – "Fire at State Hospital."
- 1920 – Population: 5,004.
- 1922 – WNAD radio begins broadcasting.
- 1923 – University's Memorial Stadium opens.
- 1924 – McFarlin Methodist Church built.
- 1929 – Sooner Theatre built.
- 1939 – Cleveland County Courthouse built.
- 1940 – Population: 11,429.
- 1942 – U.S. military Naval Air Technical Training Center and Naval Flight Training Center established during World War II.
- 1946 – Norman Municipal Hospital established.
- 1950 – Rancho Drive-in cinema in business.
- 1967 – Cleveland County Historical Society incorporated.
- 1970 – Population: 52,117.
- 1975 – Cleveland County Historical Society Museum established.
- 1981 – York International manufacturing plant in business.
- 1987 – Japan-based Hitachi, Ltd. manufacturing plant in business.
- 1997 – City website online (approximate date).

== 21st century ==
- 2003
  - Japan-based Astellas Pharma Inc. office in business.
  - Tom Cole becomes U.S. representative for Oklahoma's 4th congressional district.
- 2010 – Population: 110,925.
- 2011 – "The Man Cave" Restaurant and Bar Opens
- 2012 – "The Man Cave" Restaurant and Bar Closes
- 2016 – Lynne Miller becomes mayor.
- 2020 – Adopted new flag after flag redesign contest.
- 2023 – Gary Barksdale loses bid for School Board Office 3

== See also ==
- Norman, Oklahoma history
- List of mayors of Norman, Oklahoma
- History of Cleveland County, Oklahoma
- List of Cleveland County, Oklahoma tornadoes
- National Register of Historic Places listings in Cleveland County, Oklahoma
- Timelines of other cities in Oklahoma: Oklahoma City, Tulsa

== Bibliography ==
- "Norman". Polk's Oklahoma Gazetteer and Business Directory. Chicago: R.L. Polk & Co. 1902.
- Federal Writers' Project (1941), "Norman", Oklahoma: A Guide to the Sooner State, American Guide Series, Norman: University of Oklahoma Press
- John Womack. Norman: An Early History, 1820–1900 (Norman, Okla.: Privately printed, 1976).
- John Womack. Cleveland County, Oklahoma: Historical Highlights (Noble, Okla.: Privately printed, 1983).
- Bonnie Speer. Cleveland County: Pride of the Promised Land: An Illustrated History (Norman, Okla.: Traditional Publishers, 1988).
- Paul T. Hellmann (2006). "Oklahoma: Norman". Historical Gazetteer of the United States. Taylor & Francis. ISBN 1-135-94859-3.
- Sue Schrems; Vernon Maddux (2013). Norman: 1889-1949. Images of America. Charleston, South Carolina: Arcadia.
- Sue Schrems; Vernon Maddux (2016). Norman's Navy Years: 1942-1959. Images of America. Charleston, South Carolina: Arcadia. ISBN 9781467115643.
