= History of Cleveland County, Oklahoma =

The history of Cleveland County, Oklahoma refers to the history of a county in the U.S. state of Oklahoma, and the land on which it developed prior to 1907 statehood. Prior to European colonization, the land represented the edge of the domain of the Plains Indians. France and Spain both colonized and explored the area before it became part of the United States via the Louisiana Purchase. It became part of the territory of the United States and tribal land and eventually part of the U.S. state of Oklahoma.

== Pre-1682 ==
Before being claimed by a European power, the area of the present-day Cleveland County was on the eastern fringe of the Plains Indians domain. The Cross Timbers eco-region, which runs north to south across eastern Cleveland County, provides a natural boundary line of the Great Plains, and the Plains Indians are not known to have ventured into the Cross Timbers. The tribes that would have hunted in the area of the future Cleveland County consisted of the Comanche, Kiowa, Tonkawa, and Wichita tribes. In 1545, Andres do Campo and two other Spaniards were the possibly first known Europeans to enter what is now Cleveland County. Early explorers including do Campo, were held captive by the Kaw Indians in Kansas. They escaped and fled south paralleling present-day Interstate 35 in Oklahoma and likely crossed Cleveland County on their way back to New Spain.

== European colonization 1682–1803 ==
Flag of New France

In 1682, Robert de La Salle claimed the Mississippi River, and the land onto which the Mississippi drained, as belonging to France. This area included present-day Cleveland County. Voyageurs would paddle up the Arkansas, Canadian, and Red Rivers in their canoes from bases at Natchitoches, Louisiana (on the Red River), and Arkansas Post (at the confluence of the Mississippi and Arkansas Rivers), to conduct trade with the Indians. In 1740 two French Canadians named Pierre Antoine and Paul Mallet traveled in the vicinity of what would become Cleveland County. Antoine and Mallet were on their way back from Santa Fe on a trading trip and were following the Canadian River back east while searching for a trade route to connect Santa Fe with Missouri and New Orleans. After France's defeat in the French and Indian War, France ceded the area of New France west of the Mississippi to Spain in the Treaty of Fontainebleau in 1762. For 80 years the area now known as Cleveland County was ruled by France.

Flag of New Spain

The Spanish explored parts of Oklahoma while it was part of New Spain but never ventured into what is now Cleveland County. In 1800, in the Third Treaty of San Ildefonso, France acquired the territory back from Spain, although Spain continued to administer the region. For 38 years the area now known as Cleveland County was ruled by Spain.

Flag of France

In 1803, France sold Louisiana Territory to the United States for $15 million. This became known as the Louisiana Purchase. After three years of French rule, what is now Cleveland County became part of the United States.

== United States Territory 1803–1907 ==
On October 20, 1803, the area that is now Cleveland County officially became part of the United States as part of the Louisiana Purchase. On October 1, 1804, it became part of the District of Louisiana and was administered by the governor of Indiana Territory. The capital was Saint Louis, Missouri.

After Louisiana gained statehood on April 30, 1812, the District of Louisiana became known as Missouri Territory so as not to be confused with the state of Louisiana. On March 2, 1819, the area that is now Cleveland County became part of Arkansas Territory administered out of Fort Smith, Arkansas. On May 26, 1824, this area was taken out of Arkansas Territory.

Flag of the U.S. in 1803

In August 1820, while returning from an exploratory journey to Pikes Peak (known as the Long-Bell Expedition), Major Stephen H. Long (1784–1864) traveled through future Cleveland County en route to Fort Smith, Arkansas. Long noted in his journal that huge prairie dog towns existed in the vicinity, and elk, deer, and bear were numerous. Botanist Edwin James (1797–1861) accompanied Long on the expedition. James detailed this trip in his book From Pittsburgh To The Rocky Mountains.

In the autumn of 1832, Captain Jesse Bean (1784–1844) led a troop of U.S. Rangers (mounted militia) from Fort Gibson through present-day Cleveland County on an expedition to seek a settlement between the nearby Plains Indians and the newly resettled Five Civilized Tribes. They failed to make contact with any of the plains tribes. Bean and his men encamped on Bishop Creek in present Norman. While there they were nearly overrun by a herd of stampeding buffalo. Author Washington Irving (1783–1859) accompanied Bean on this trip and wrote of his experiences in his book A Tour On The Prairies.

On March 24, 1832, with the Treaty of Cusseta, the area that is now Cleveland County was ceded to the Creek Tribe, one of the Five Civilized Tribes. The area became part of the Creek Nation with the capital at Okmulgee. The Creeks were removed from Alabama.

In the summer of 1834, the First Dragoon Expedition (also known as the Dodge-Leavenworth Expedition) passed through present-day Cleveland County. The expedition had just completed a parley with the Plains Indians in western Indian Territory. There they were successful in obtaining the release of a 9-year-old Texas boy that had been kidnapped in the spring. The expedition en route back to Fort Gibson crossed the Canadian River somewhere between present Norman and Lexington. Sergeant Hugh Evans recorded in his journal that there were large herds of buffalo on both sides of the Canadian. The dragoons remained in the area for a few days drying buffalo meat and awaiting the return of a courier that had been dispatched earlier. Artist George Catlin (1796–1872) accompanied this expedition.

== Indian Territory 1834–1890 ==
On June 30, 1834, Indian Territory, which included present-day Cleveland County, was officially created by the Congress.

In May 1835, a detachment of dragoons from Fort Gibson established an outpost on Chouteau Creek in the area where Slaughterville is today, less than a mile south of Bryant Road on the west side of 84th Street. Called Camp Holmes (after Lieutenant Theophilus H. Holmes 1804–1880) the outpost was to be used as a council grounds for talks between the U.S. Government Stokes Commission and Indian tribes from the southern plains. On August 24 or 25, 1835, a treaty was signed with the Comanche and Wichita tribes. Camp Holmes was also known as "Camp Mason" and "Mason's Fort" after Major Richard B. Mason (1797–1850) who was the dragoon officer in charge of constructing the post.

Shortly after the Treaty of Camp Holmes was signed, the dragoons abandoned Camp Holmes. A trader by the name of Auguste P. Chouteau (1786–1838) set up a trading post on the site and conducted trade with the plains tribes. The site was known as Chouteau's Trading Post or "Chouteau's Fort". Chouteau died in 1838, at which time the trading post was abandoned.

In 1839, Dr. Josiah Gregg (1806–1850) left Fort Smith, Arkansas, en route to Santa Fe in the Mexican state of Santa Fe de Nuevo Mexico with $25,000 worth of merchandise loaded in a number of wagons, a party of thirty men, and two cannons. He hoped to establish trade with the Mexicans. Gregg followed the Canadian River west and camped at Chouteau's abandoned post. Here he was met by 40 dragoons from Fort Gibson under the command of a Lieutenant Bowman. Bowman had orders to escort Gregg to the 100th meridian, which at that time was the boundary of the United States. Gregg wrote about his Santa Fe trading days in his two volume book Commerce Of The Prairies. Gregg followed the same route back to Fort Smith, Arkansas in 1840.

In the summer of 1843, Captain Nathan Boone (1781–1856), youngest son of Daniel Boone (1734–1820), on a reconnaissance mission of the Santa Fe Trail, North Central and Central Indian Territory, entered what is now Cleveland County while en route back to Fort Gibson. Boone and his troop of dragoons camped on Bell Creek in the Noble area, three-tenths of a mile east of U.S. 77 on Maguire Road. The next day Boone stopped by Chouteau's old abandoned post to rest his men and horses for an hour before proceeding east toward Fort Gibson.

In the summer of 1845, an expedition under Lieutenant James W. Abert (1820–1897) left Bent's Fort, Colorado, to reconnoiter the U.S.-Mexico-Republic of Texas border. By October, Abert had made his way down the Canadian River to present day Cleveland County. Abert camped in the areas of Norman, Noble, and stopped by Chouteau's old trading post. Abert wrote of Chouteau's post: "A lofty gate-post was leaning mournfully over the ruins around, borne down by the weight of declining years and the ravages of time. Here we saw fragments of wagons which, by their age, showed that the place had long been deserted. There was the scarcely distinguishable road, in many places overgrown with weeds and shrubs. Some of our people, in the height of their enthusiasm, mounted the chimney, and unfurled the American handkerchief that it might float in the breeze. It was a grateful sight to all once more to meet certain vestiges of the white man." Chouteau's Post had been abandoned for seven years at this time. Abert and his men marched on to Fort Gibson.

The California Gold Rush prompted many emigrant trains headed west to seek their fortunes. Captain Randolph B. Marcy (1812–1887) was directed to take a wagon train west, and to make a trail to Santa Fe, New Mexico. Marcy left Fort Smith, Arkansas in May 1849 following the course of the Canadian River. Marcy mainly stayed on the south side of the Canadian River, but there was a north branch of the California Road that stayed on the north side of the river from Eufaula to Chouteau's old trading post, and then crossed the Canadian there, rejoining the south branch of the road. At this time there were some Kichai Indians living in the vicinity of the old post. Marcy wrote a guide book for emigrants heading west called The Prairie Traveler that was full of maps, illustration, and itineraries.

Jesse Chisholm (1805–1868), of Chisholm Trail fame, set up a trading post at Chouteau's old post in 1854, and ran it intermittently until his death in 1868. Chisholm traded with the Plains Indians and those headed west on the California Road.

=== Seminole Nation 1856–1866 ===
On August 7, 1856, the area that is now Cleveland County was ceded to the Seminole Tribe, one of the Five Civilized Tribes with the capital being at Wewoka. The Seminoles were removed from Florida.

In November 1858, Edward F. Beale (1822–1893) was surveying a proposed wagon road from Fort Smith, Arkansas, to the Colorado River and passed by Chisholm's Post. Beale writes of the place "I rode yesterday with Mr. Green up this stream for about three miles, and discovered on a small tributary of it the remains of old Choteau's trading post; looking among the ruins, I found a human skull, which I tied behind my saddle, and brought back to camp." Apparently at this time Chisholm was not doing business here as there is no mention of him. Beale referred to this area as Kichai Indian country, so it is probable that the tribe was still living in the neighborhood.

=== Civil War 1861–1865 ===
On August 1, 1861, the Seminole Nation sided with the Confederacy. One band of Seminoles sided with the Union. This band under Chief Chupco fled to Kansas. Chief Chupco later became a 1st Sergeant with F Company of the Indian Home Guard.

The Seminoles loyal to the Confederates were led by Chief John Jumper. The confederate Seminoles formed the 1st Battalion Seminole Mounted Volunteers and the 1st Regiment Seminole Mounted Volunteers.

With the Reconstruction Treaties of 1866, the Seminoles were forced to sell their lands in present Cleveland County to the U.S. government for 15¢ per acre for siding with the Confederacy during the Civil War. This left an area open that became known as the Unassigned Lands.

=== Late 1800s ===
During the 1870s, many Texas cattlemen wanted to drive their stocks north to the railways in Kansas in order to ship their beef to markets in Chicago. The Arbuckle Trail was an east branch of the Chisholm Trail. The trail crossed the Red River at Thacker Ferry and ran north to Fort Arbuckle and then to what is now Norman and then northwest to what is now Kingfisher where it re-joined the Chisholm Trail.

A Cherokee man by the name of Dave Blue built a trading post on Dave Blue Creek in present-day Norman, less than a mile south of Oklahoma State Highway 9 on 48th Avenue SE. He would employ Cherokee and Creek Indians to hunt buffalo and then ship the hides to Atoka to market.

In 1871, the United States General Land Office contracted with Theodore H. Barrett to survey a north–south route for a railroad west of the Indian Meridian. [132nd Ave.] A year later in November 1872, a survey crew led by Abner E. Norman came through the area stopping at a spring on Bishop Creek to camp overnight, less than a mile south of Lindsey Street on the west side of Classen Boulevard. Peeling the bark from a large elm tree, one of the men burned the words "Norman's Camp" into the trunk of the tree.

In 1885, the Kansas Southern Railway received permission to build a railroad from Arkansas City to Purcell over the route that Theodore H. Barrett had surveyed in 1871–72. Some railroad officials selected a 13 1/2-acre site 1 1/2 miles north of the spring at "Norman's Camp" [Area where Duffy St. crosses railroad tracks in Norman] as a station grounds and watering site. The line reached Norman Station as it was known then on April 15, 1885, and was completed at Purcell on April 26. At Purcell the railroad joined another line that was built by another railroad company that had started its line in Galveston. The Kansas Southern Railway was sold to the Atchison, Topeka and Santa Fe Railway AT&SF in 1899. In 1996, the AT&SF merged with the Burlington Northern Railroad making the Burlington Northern Santa Fe Railway BNSF. The first passenger train came into Norman Station on June 13, 1887, headed northbound.

On December 19, 1890, the territorial legislature placed the University of Oklahoma in Norman, Oklahoma, stipulating that the town donate 40 acres and raise $10,000 through bond sales. In 1892, the school's first students enrolled.

== Oklahoma 1907-present ==
At 1907 statehood, Cleveland County had a population of 18,460. The county's early economy was based on agriculture, with 371,640 acres of farm land a year after statehood in 1907.

By the 1920s, the University of Oklahoma campus had grown to 267 acres and the population of the county's biggest city continued to grow, reaching 9,603 by 1930.

In 1939, a new county courthouse was built to replace a 1906 building.

== See also ==
- Timeline of Norman, Oklahoma
- List of Cleveland County, Oklahoma tornadoes
