= Emmett Till Antilynching Act =

2022 US hate crime legislation

- Long title: To amend section 249 of title 18, United States Code, to specify lynching as a hate crime act.
- Enacted by: the 117th United States Congress
- Effective: March 29, 2022

Citations
- Public law: Pub. L. 117–107 (text) (PDF)
- Statutes at Large: 136 Stat. 1125

Codification
- Titles amended: Title 18—Crimes and Criminal Procedure
- U.S.C. sections amended: 18 U.S.C. § 249

Legislative history
- Introduced in the House as H.R. 55 by Bobby Rush (D–IL) on January 4, 2021; Committee consideration by House Judiciary; Passed the House on February 28, 2022 (422–3); Passed the Senate on March 7, 2022 (unanimous consent); Signed into law by President Joe Biden on March 29, 2022

Then-senator Kamala Harris debates in support of the Emmett Till Antilynching Act on June 5, 2020.

The Emmett Till Antilynching Act is a United States federal law which defines lynching as a federal hate crime, increasing the maximum penalty to 30 years imprisonment for several hate crime offenses.

It was passed by the U.S. House of Representatives on February 28, 2022, and U.S. Senate on March 7, 2022, and signed into law on March 29, 2022, by President Joe Biden.

== Background ==
During the post-Civil War era, in 1870 Congress passed the conspiracy against rights bill (now codified as 18 U.S. Code § 241) which made it unlawful for two or more persons to conspire to injure, threaten, or intimidate a person in any state, territory, or district in the free exercise or enjoyment of any right or privilege secured to him or her by the Constitution or the laws of the U.S. For example, this law made it illegal to threaten someone with the intent of preventing them from voting.

In 1968, Congress passed the Civil Rights Act of 1968, which created a federal hate crime for persons who injure, intimidate, or interfere with selected minorities (including African Americans) while the victim was participating in certain enumerated activities (including voting, attending school, applying for a job, or serving on a jury). This was the first federal hate crime law, and was codified as 18 U.S.C. § 245, 249.

In 2009, Congress passed the Matthew Shepard and James Byrd Jr. Hate Crimes Prevention Act, which extended the hate crime laws created by Civil Rights Act of 1968 in two ways: first, the requirement that the victim be engaged in one of several particular activities was eliminated; and second, sexual orientation was added as a protected class for victims. This law enabled federal prosecutors, for example, to charge perpetrators who injured, or attempted to injure Africans Americans because of the victim's actual or perceived race or color.

In addition to federal statutes, all states have laws which criminalize murder, assault and battery. Forty-seven states and the District of Columbia have statutes criminalizing various types of bias-motivated violence or intimidation (the exceptions being Arkansas, South Carolina, and Wyoming).

A federal antilynching bill had been in discussion for over a century and had been proposed hundreds of times. Past attempts which passed at least one legislative chamber include the Dyer Anti-Lynching Bill, the Costigan–Wagner Bill and the Justice for Victims of Lynching Act.

== 116th Congress ==
Representative Bobby Rush introduced a bill, H.R. 35, on January 3, 2019, at the beginning of the 116th United States Congress.

The bill was named after 14-year-old Emmett Till, who was lynched in Mississippi in 1955, sparking national and international outrage after photos of his mutilated corpse were published in Black-oriented print media.

The bill was reported out of the House Judiciary Committee on October 31, 2019, and was passed by the House, 410–4, on February 26, 2020.

During June 2020, while protests and civil unrest over the murder of George Floyd were occurring nationwide, the bill was considered by the Senate. Senator Rand Paul prevented the bill from being passed by unanimous consent as he opposed the bill's language for being overly broad. Paul felt the legislation would include attacks which he felt were not extreme enough to qualify as "lynching", stating that "this bill would cheapen the meaning of lynching by defining it so broadly as to include a minor bruise or abrasion." Paul proposed an amendment that would apply a "serious bodily injury standard" for a crime to be considered as lynching.

House majority leader Steny Hoyer criticized Rand Paul's position, saying on Twitter that "it is shameful that one GOP Senator is standing in the way of seeing this bill become law." Then-senator Kamala Harris added that "Senator Paul is now trying to weaken a bill that was already passed — there's no reason for this" while speaking to have the amendment defeated.

== 117th Congress ==
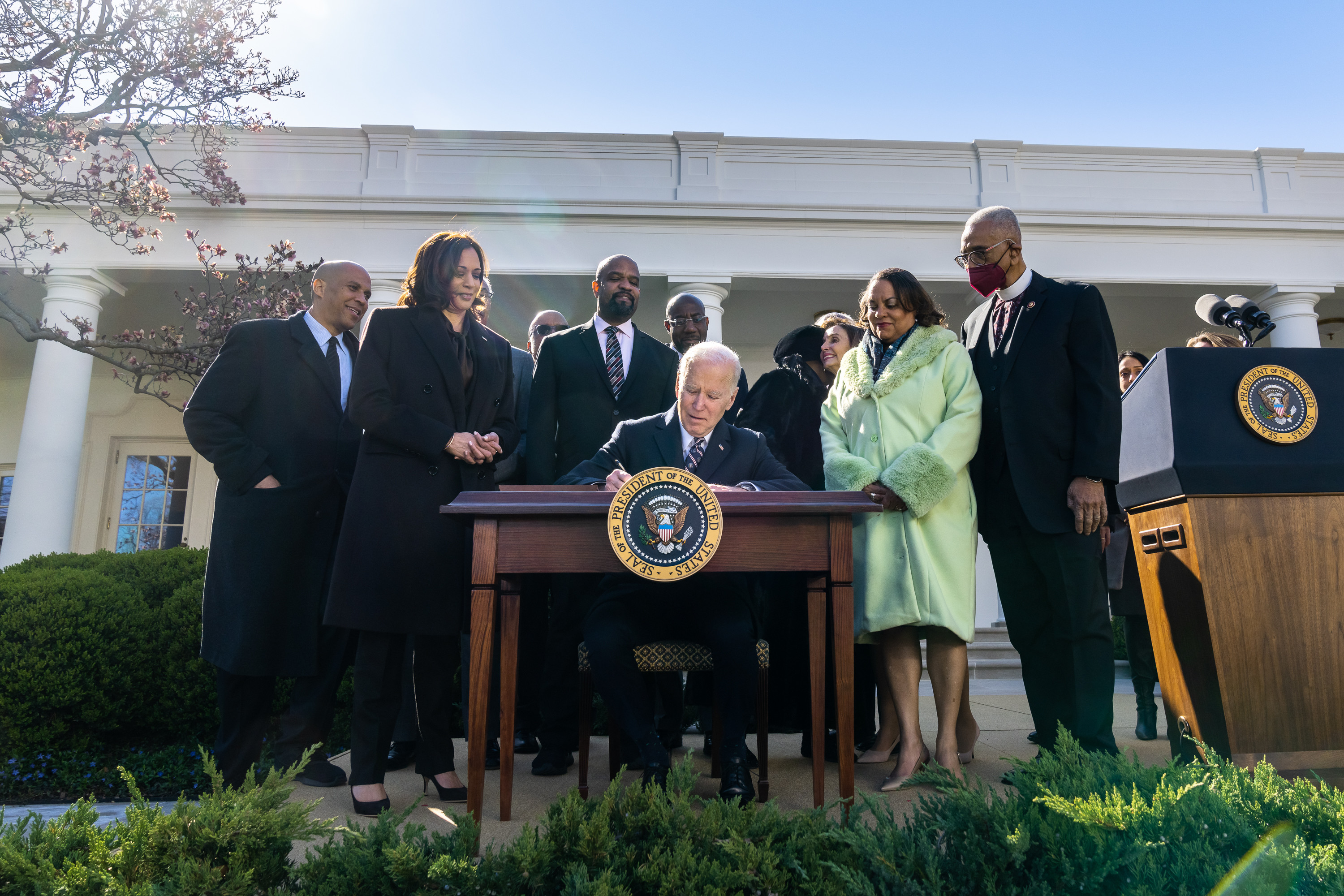
President Joe Biden signs the Emmett Till Antilynching Act in the White House Rose Garden on March 29, 2022

The bill was reintroduced by Rush as H.R. 55 for the 117th Congress, this time revised to include a serious bodily injury standard, and was passed by the House on February 28, 2022. The vote was 422–3, with Republicans Andrew Clyde, Thomas Massie, and Chip Roy voting against. The bill was introduced to the Senate by Senator Cory Booker and cosponsored by senators Rand Paul, Tim Scott, and Raphael Warnock, among others. They passed the bill through unanimous consent on March 7, 2022. Senate majority leader Chuck Schumer remarked on the Senate floor after the bill's passage that: "After more than 200 failed attempts to outlaw lynching, Congress is finally succeeding in taking the long overdue action by passing the Emmett Till Antilynching Act. Hallelujah. It's long overdue." The bill was signed into law by President Joe Biden on March 29, 2022.

== Text ==
The act amends section 249(a) of Title 18 of the United States Code to include:

(5) LYNCHING.—Whoever conspires to commit any offense under paragraph (1), (2), or (3) shall, if death or serious bodily injury (as defined in section 2246 of this title) results from the offense, be imprisoned for not more than 30 years, fined in accordance with this title, or both.

(6) OTHER CONSPIRACIES.—Whoever conspires to commit any offense under paragraph (1), (2), or (3) shall, if death or serious bodily injury (as defined in section 2246 of this title) results from the offense, or if the offense includes kidnapping or an attempt to kidnap, aggravated sexual abuse or an attempt to commit aggravated sexual abuse, or an attempt to kill, be imprisoned for not more than 30 years, fined in accordance with this title, or both.

== Effect ==
The Emmett Till Antilynching Act extended the existing federal hate crime law (18 U.S. Code § 245 and § 249) by criminalizing collaborators that helped plan violent acts against victims, when the violence is based on the victim's race, religion, color, sexual orientation, or certain other characteristics. For example, if a mob of ten people plan an attack on an individual because of the victim's race, and two of the ten kill or seriously injure the victim, the Emmett Till Act extends culpability to the other eight conspirators.

The Emmett Till Act, unlike some other conspiracy-based crimes, requires that the attack be carried out – mere planning without subsequent injury or death is not a crime under the act. Spectators in a mob who watch the violence, but did not participate in the planning, are not culpable under the Emmett Till Act.

== Legislative history ==
Congress	Short title	Bill number(s)	Date introduced	Sponsor(s)	# of cosponsors	Latest status
116th Congress	Emmett Till Antilynching Act of 2019	H.R. 35	January 3, 2019	Bobby Rush (D-IL1)	148	Passed the House.
116th Congress	Emmett Till Antilynching Act of 2019	S.488	February 14, 2019	Kamala Harris (D-CA)	47	Objected to by Senator Rand Paul (R-KY).
117th Congress	Emmett Till Antilynching Act of 2021	H.R. 55	January 4, 2021	Bobby Rush (D-IL1)	181	Became law.
117th Congress	Emmett Till Antilynching Act of 2021	S.3710	February 28, 2022	Cory Booker (D-NJ)	9	Passed the Senate.

== See also ==
- Dyer Anti-Lynching Bill, 1918
- Justice for Victims of Lynching Act, 2018
- Lynching in the United States
