= James W. Maney =

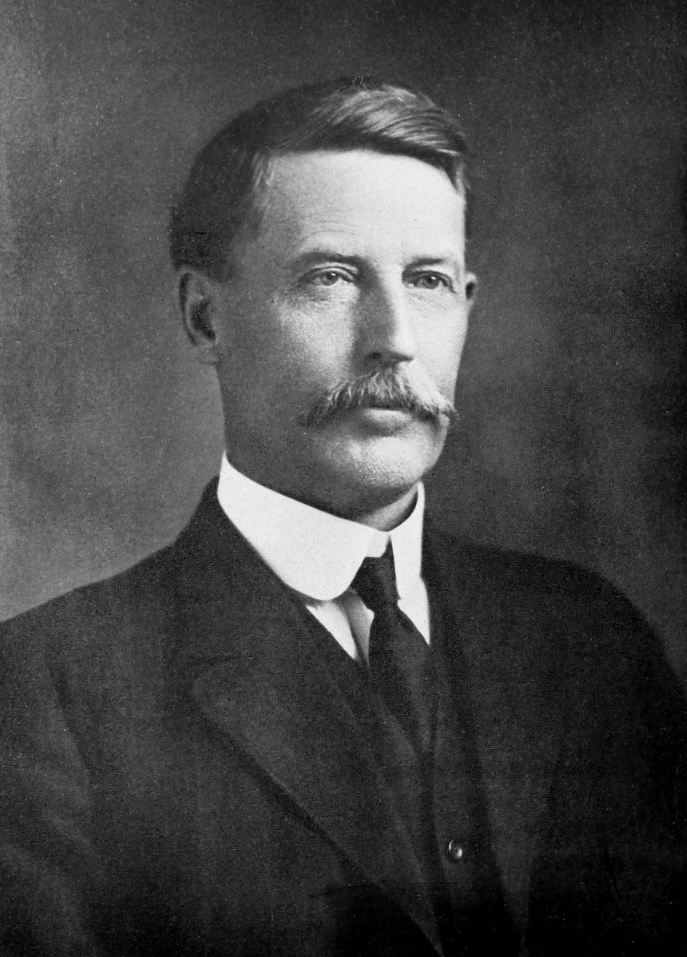
- Born: January 3, 1862; Pittsburgh, Pennsylvania
- Died: July 13, 1945 (aged 83); Oklahoma City, Oklahoma
- Occupation: railroad contractor
- Known for: built railroads, helped develop Oklahoma City, namesake of Maney Historic District

Signature
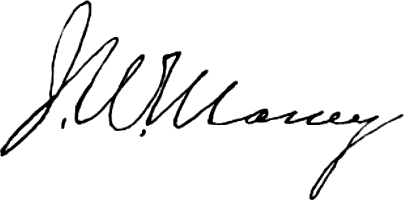

James W. Maney (January 3, 1862 – July 13, 1945) was an American engineer and railroad contractor during the late 19th and early 20th century. He was an early resident of Oklahoma City, Oklahoma, helped to shape its development, and lived there most of his life. He built railroads throughout the West, invented a widely used earth-moving tool, and lived in a now-historic home.

== Early life ==
On January 3, 1862, James William Maney was born to Michael Maney and Johanna Hartnet Maney in Pittsburgh, Pennsylvania. Both parents were Irish and had immigrated from County Kerry, Ireland. The family later moved to Iowa, where James grew up on a farm.

== Career ==
At age 17, Maney began working for the Union Pacific Railroad. By age 22 he had become a railroad contractor, which became his lifelong career. At the age of 22 he built three miles on the Burlington and Missouri River Railroad in the state of Nebraska. His next contract was in South Dakota. When Oklahoma was opened for settlement in 1889, Maney built the second railroad into the state. Within months of the opening of the territory, he settled in the area which would become Oklahoma City. By 1900 he was reputed to be "the largest railroad contractor in Oklahoma."

In addition to building railroads, he went into the mill and grain business, and bought large tracts of land in both rural Oklahoma and Oklahoma City. He also owned a controlling interest in the Jordan Valley Irrigation District in Oregon and helped develop that land for agricultural purposes.

He was instrumental in the development and growth of Oklahoma City. He worked closely with Henry Overholser and Anton H. Classen. He built a Victorian mansion in downtown Oklahoma City, where he and his family resided until his death in 1945. The house was later used as the location of the offices for the Oklahoma Gazette and is now a bed and breakfast. The Maney House located north of NW 10th on N. Shartel. in Oklahoma City.

The Maney Historic District in Oklahoma City is named for him and is listed on the National Register of Historic Places. His former house is described as the oldest and most architecturally unique house in the historic district.

He is known for his invention of an earth-moving tool called the Baker-Maney scraper, built by the Baker Manufacturing Company of Springfield, Illinois. The original model is in the Smithsonian Institution.

Maney joined the Knights of Columbus, at the time a new society, and became Oklahoma's very first Grand Knight.

== Marriage and death ==
On May 13, 1889, James William Maney wed Alphonsina Gerrer. Alphonsina was born in Alsace, France and lived there until she was a young teenager. James and Alphonsina had seven children, one of whom died during childhood at the age of 2 due to diphtheria. Alphonsina died following the birth of the seventh child due to blood poisoning. He was left widowed to raise the remaining six children. He died July 13, 1945, at the age of 83, and interred in the Maney family vault at the El Reno cemetery. Just a hundred yards away from the Interurban rail line from Oklahoma City to El Reno which he helped develop and construct for Oklahoma Railway.
