= Dyer Anti-Lynching Bill =

U.S. bill intended to prevent lynching

Leonidas C. Dyer, Republican representative from Missouri, sponsor of the Dyer Anti-Lynching Bill.

The Dyer Anti-Lynching Bill (1918) was first introduced in the 65th United States Congress by Representative Leonidas C. Dyer, a Republican from St. Louis, Missouri, in the United States House of Representatives as H.R. 11279 in order "to protect citizens of the United States against lynching in default of protection by the States." It was intended to establish lynching as a federal crime.

The Dyer Anti-Lynching Bill was re-introduced in subsequent sessions of United States Congress and passed, 230 to 119, by the House of Representatives on January 26, 1922, but its passage was halted in the United States Senate by a filibuster by Southern Democrats, who formed a powerful block. Southern Democrats justified their opposition to the bill by arguing that lynchings were a response to rapes and proclaiming that lynchings were an issue that should be left for states to deal with.

Attempts to pass similar legislation took a halt until the Costigan-Wagner Bill of 1934. Subsequent bills followed but failed due to powerful opposition from Southern senators; it was not until 2022 that both chambers of Congress passed the Emmett Till Antilynching Act to make lynching a federal crime.

== Background ==
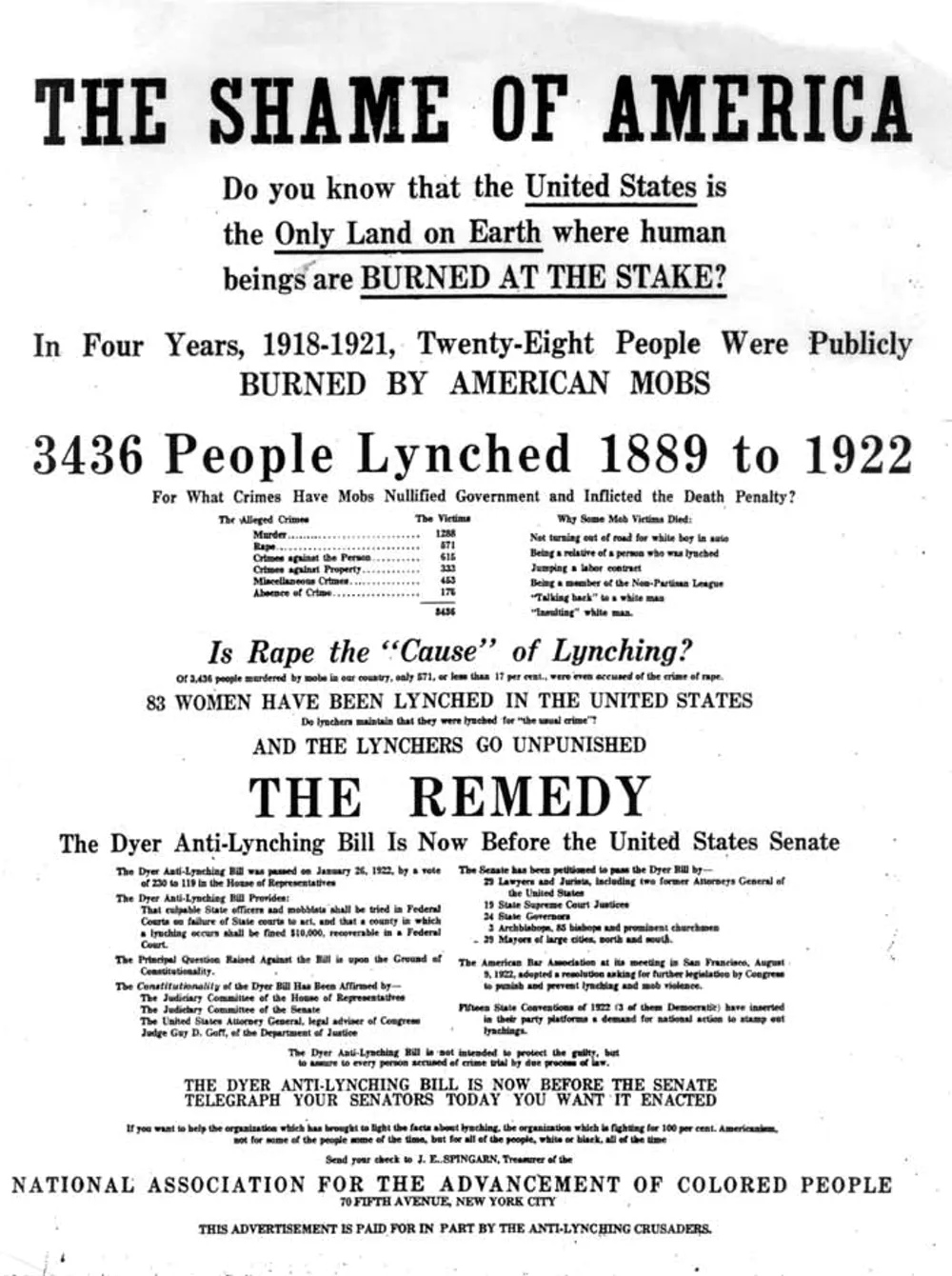
1922 NAACP advertisement attempted to raise awareness about the lynching epidemic and the proposed Dyer anti-lynching bill.

In the early 20th century, lynchings were predominantly committed by whites against African Americans in the Southern states. According to statistics compiled by the Tuskegee Institute, between the years 1882 and 1951 some 4,730 people were lynched in the United States, of whom 3,437 were black and 1,293 were white. The first wave of lynchings occurred in the years immediately following the Civil War, but fell off sharply with the dissolution of the first Ku Klux Klan about 1870. There was a revival in the 1890s; the largest annual number of lynchings occurred in 1892 (230 persons were lynched that year: 161 African-Americans and 69 whites). and continued for the next two decades at relatively high levels, in what is often called the nadir of American race relations, a period marked by disfranchisement of African Americans and Jim Crow in the South, and discrimination against African Americans across the country.

Many lynchings were the result of Southern whites' extrajudicial efforts to maintain white supremacy, after gaining disfranchisement of most Black people through discriminatory voter registration and electoral rules, and imposing segregation and Jim Crow laws on the black population in the late 19th and early 20th century. Maintaining white supremacy in economic affairs played a part as well. Social changes resulting from a rapid rise in immigration from southern and eastern Europe, the rise of the Second Ku Klux Klan, and the internal Great Migration of Black people from the South to industrial cities in the Northeast and Midwest contributed to violent confrontations. In 1917, white mobs had attacked Black people in East St. Louis (a city located directly across the Mississippi River from St. Louis, Missouri) over competition for work and punishment for strikebreakers.

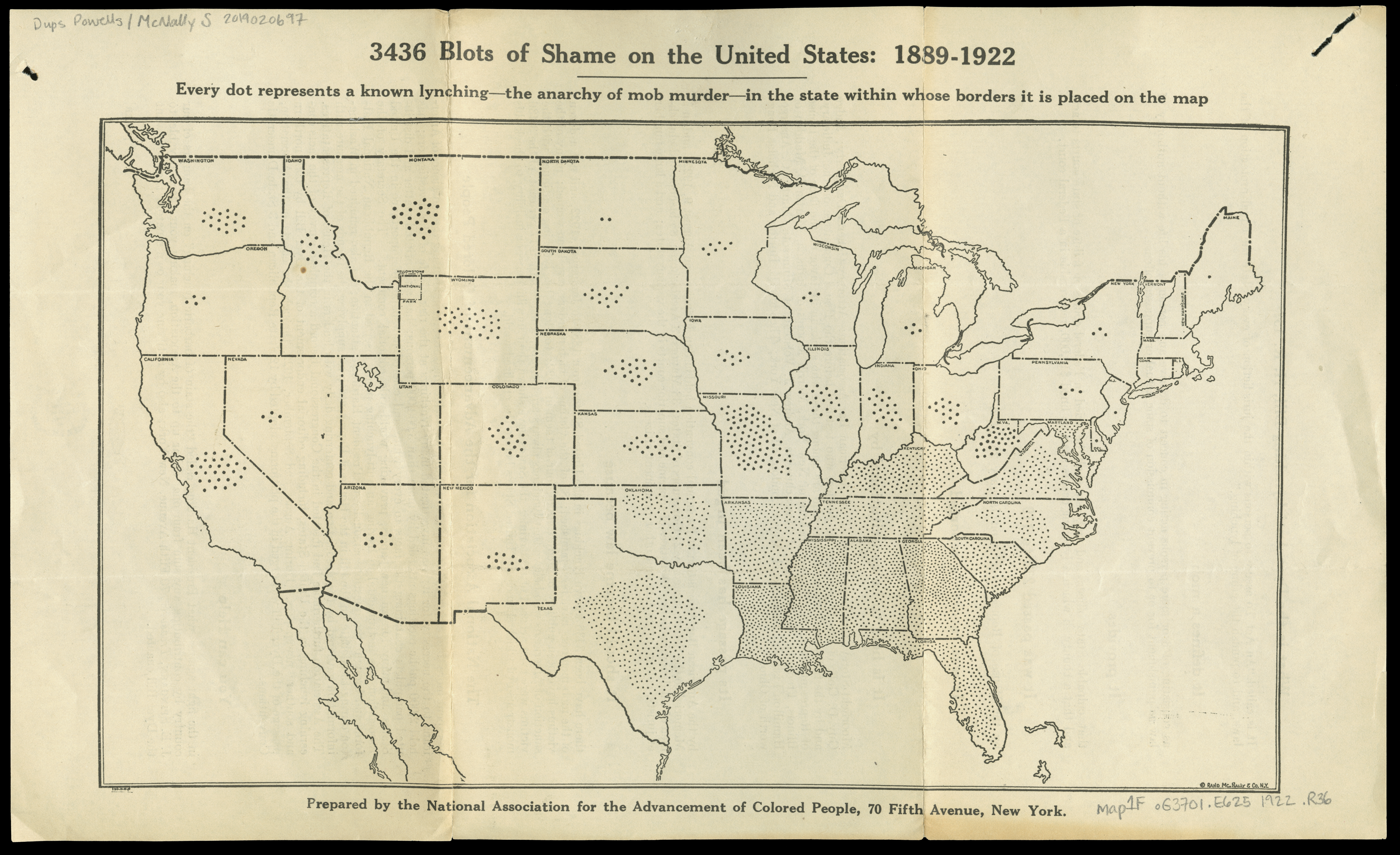
Map used to argued for the passage of the bill in 1922

In 1900 Representative George Henry White, a black Republican from North Carolina, introduced the first anti-lynching bill in Congress. It was subsequently defeated in a committee. In April 1919, the NAACP published a report which disproved the myth that stated most lynchings were based on African-American attacks on white women: less than one sixth of the 2,500 African Americans lynched from 1889 to 1918 had even been accused of rape.

== The Bill is introduced ==
Representative Leonidas C. Dyer, who represented a majority African-American district, had taken notice of the hate crimes occurring around him and was outraged by the violence and disregard for law in such riots. Dyer was especially concerned about the continued high rate of lynchings in the South and the failure of local and state authorities to prosecute them. This inspired his anti-lynching bill. The Dyer Anti-Lynching Bill (1918) (H.R. 11279) was introduced in order "to protect citizens of the United States against lynching in default of protection by the States."

A silent protest in support of the bill was organized by African Americans on June 14, 1922, in Washington, D.C. Republican U.S. President Warren G. Harding announced his support for Dyer's bill during a speaking engagement in Birmingham, Alabama. Although the bill was quickly passed by a large majority in the House of Representatives, it was prevented from coming to a vote in 1922, 1923, and 1924 in the U.S. Senate, due to filibusters by the Southern Democratic bloc. Southern Senators opposed anti-lynching laws and other civil rights legislation on the ground that Black people were responsible for more crime, more babies born out of wedlock, more welfare and other forms of social assistance, and that strong measures were needed to keep them under control.

This was the first time the Senate Journal was used as a means to filibuster legislation as the Senate rules state that "the reading of the Journal shall not be suspended unless by unanimous consent". During debate for the Bill in 1922, the Mississippi Senator Pat Harrison started discussing the Senate Journal and was unable to be clotured until the sponsors withdrew the Bill.

== Overview ==
US House of Representatives Report No. 452 (1921)

The bill classified lynching as a federal felony, which would have allowed the United States to prosecute cases, since states and local authorities seldom did. The bill prescribed punishments for perpetrators, specifically:

- (a) A maximum of 5 years in prison, $5,000 fine, or both, for any state or city official who had the power to protect a person in his jurisdiction but failed to do so or who had the power to prosecute those responsible and failed to do so.
- (b) A minimum of 5 years in prison for anyone who participated in a lynching, whether they were an ordinary citizen or the official responsible for keeping the victim safe.
- (c) $10,000 fine to be paid by the county in which the lynching took place, to be turned over to the victim's family or his parents, or to the United States government if the victim has no family. If the victim was seized in one county and killed in another, both counties were to be fined.

In addition, the law prescribed actions of special circumstances:

- (a) If officers fail to equally protect all citizens, they can be prosecuted in federal court.
- (b) Foreign visitors were not exempt from this law and were to be prosecuted within the laws of the state or territory, as well as protected by those same laws.

== Aftermath ==
From 1882 to 1968, "...nearly 200 anti-lynching bills were introduced in Congress, and three passed the House. Seven presidents between 1890 and 1952 asked Congress to pass a federal law." No bills were approved by the Senate during this time period because of the powerful opposition of the conservative Southern Democratic voting bloc.

However, the publicity the bill generated, together with the NAACP report and the National Conference on Lynching, moved local and state governments to take lynching more seriously. Lynchings decreased dramatically after 1919.

In 1922 and 1923, Senator William Borah spoke against passage of the Dyer Anti-Lynching Bill, which had passed the House. A strong supporter of state sovereignty, he believed that punishing state officials for failure to prevent lynchings was unconstitutional, and that if the states could not prevent such murders, federal legislation would do no good. The bill was defeated by filibuster in the Senate by Southern Democrats. When another bill (Costigan–Wagner Bill) was introduced in 1935 and 1938, Borah continued to speak against it, by that time saying that it was no longer needed, as the number of lynchings had dropped sharply.

On June 13, 2005, in a resolution sponsored by senators Mary Landrieu of Louisiana and George Allen of Virginia, together with 78 others, the US Senate formally apologized for its failure to enact this and other anti-lynching bills "when action was most needed." On June 30, 2018, three senators (Kamala Harris, Cory Booker, and Tim Scott) introduced the Justice for Victims of Lynching Act to make lynching a Federal hate crime. The Senate voted unanimously in favor of it on December 19, 2018, but the bill died because it was not passed by the House before the 115th Congress ended on January 3, 2019.

On February 26, 2020, the Emmett Till Antilynching Act, a revised version of the Justice for Victims of Lynching Act, passed the House of Representatives, by a vote of 410–4. Senator Rand Paul of Kentucky has held the bill from passage by unanimous consent in the Senate, out of concern that a convicted criminal could face "a new 10-year penalty for ... minor bruising". Paul requested expedited passage of an amended version of the bill, which would require "an attempt to do bodily harm" for an act to be considered lynching, saying that lynching is already illegal under federal Law. House Majority Leader Steny Hoyer criticized Paul's position, saying on Twitter that "it is shameful that one GOP Senator is standing in the way of seeing this bill become law". Then-senator Kamala Harris added that "Senator Paul is now trying to weaken a bill that was already passed – there's no reason for this" while speaking to have the amendment defeated.

A revised version of the Emmett Till Antilynching Act, with the addition of a serious bodily injury standard, was introduced in the 117th Congress. It passed the House of Representatives on February 28, 2022, and the Senate on March 7, 2022. It was signed into law by President Joe Biden on March 29, 2022.
