= Justice for Victims of Lynching Act =

Bill to classify lynching a federal hate crime

- Long title: A bill to amend title 18, United States Code, to specify lynching as a deprivation of civil rights, and for other purposes.
- Announced in: the 115th United States Congress

Legislative history
- Introduced in the Senate as S. 3178 by Sen. Kamala Harris (D-CA) on June 28, 2018; Committee consideration by United States Senate Committee on the Judiciary; Passed the Senate on December 19, 2018 (unanimous)

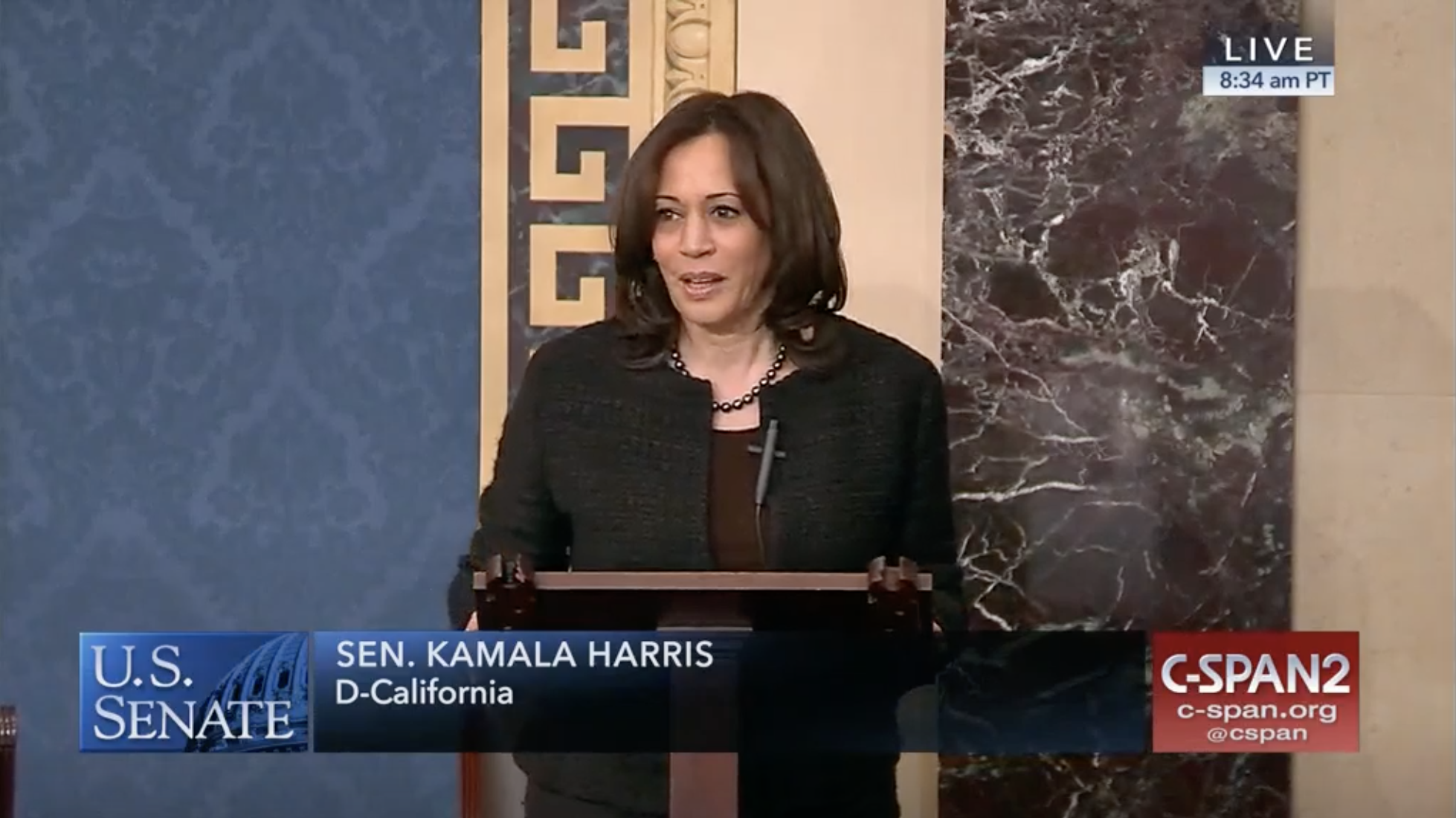
Kamala Harris presenting the Justice for Victims of Lynching Act in the Senate

The Justice for Victims of Lynching Act of 2018 was a proposed bill to classify lynching (defined as bodily injury on the basis of perceived race, color, religion or nationality) a federal hate crime in the United States. The largely symbolic bill aimed to recognize and apologize for historical governmental failures to prevent lynching in the country.

The act was introduced in the U.S. Senate in June 2018 by the body's three Black members from both parties: Kamala Harris, Cory Booker, and Tim Scott. The legislation passed the Senate unanimously on December 19, 2018. The bill died because it was not passed by the House before the 115th Congress ended on January 3, 2019.

== Aftermath ==
On February 26, 2020, the Emmett Till Antilynching Act, a revised version of the Justice for Victims of Lynching Act, passed the House of Representatives, by a vote of 410–4. Sen. Rand Paul of Kentucky has held the bill from passage by unanimous consent in the Senate, out of concern that a convicted criminal could face "a new 10-year penalty for... minor bruising." Paul requested expedited passage of an amended version of the bill which would require "an attempt to do bodily harm" for an act to be considered lynching, noting that lynching is already illegal under Federal Law. House Majority Leader Steny Hoyer criticized Rand Paul's position, saying on Twitter that "it is shameful that one GOP Senator is standing in the way of seeing this bill become law." Senator Kamala Harris added that "Senator Paul is now trying to weaken a bill that was already passed — there's no reason for this" while speaking to have the amendment defeated.

A revised version of the bill that includes a serious bodily injury standard was introduced in the 117th Congress. It was passed by the House on February 28, 2022, and by the Senate on March 7, 2022. The bill was signed into law by President Joe Biden on March 29, 2022.
