= First Unitarian Church of Omaha =

Historic church in Nebraska, United States

- U.S. National Register of Historic Places
- Omaha Landmark
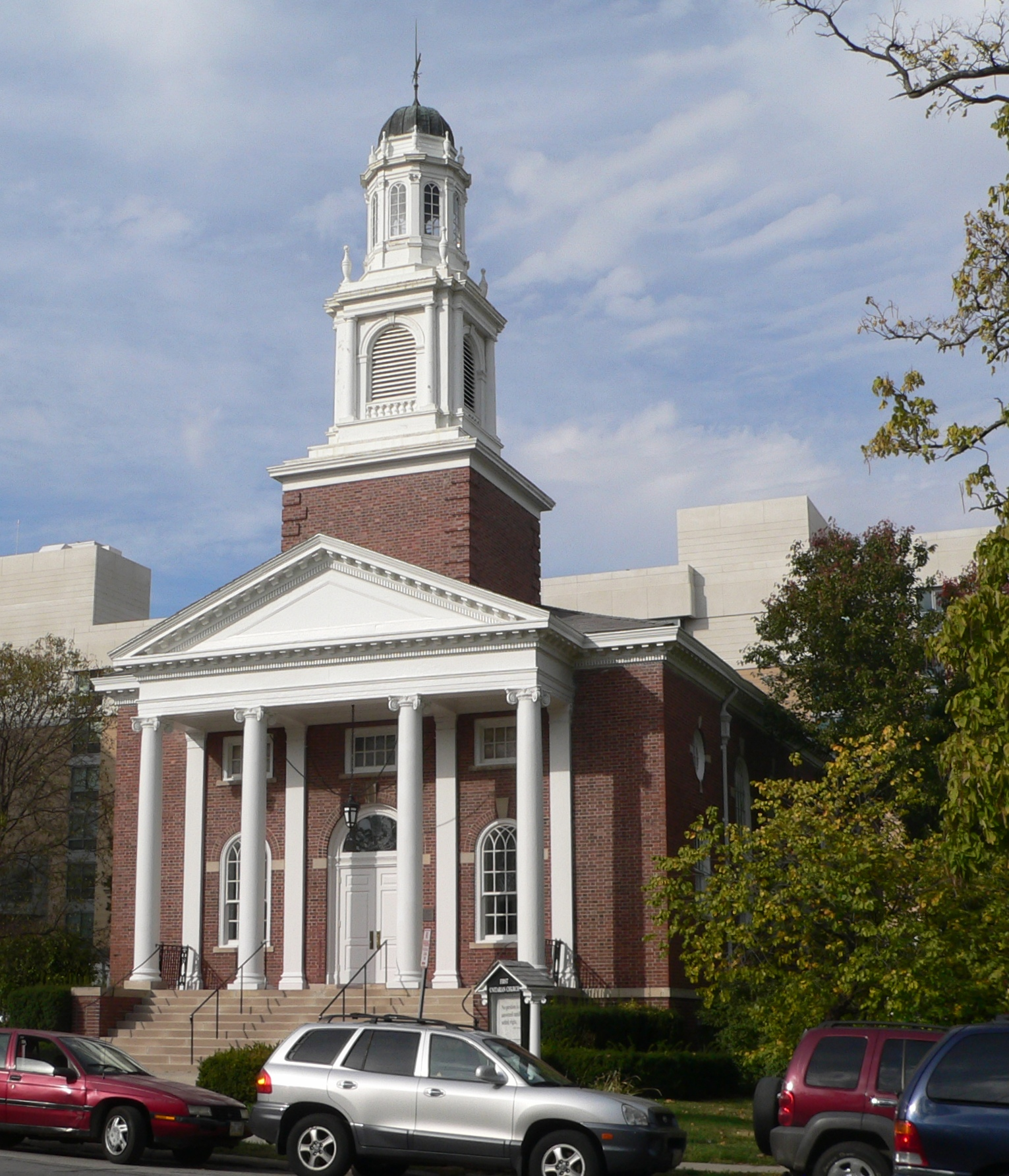
- View from south, across Harney Street

- Location within Nebraska Location within the United States
- Location: Omaha, Nebraska
- Coordinates: 41.2569057792381°N 95.95850917892008°W
- Built: 1917
- Architect: John McDonald, Alan McDonald
- Architectural style: Colonial Revival
- Website: https://www.firstuuomaha.org/
- NRHP reference No.: 80002448

Significant dates
- Added to NRHP: March 27, 1980
- Designated OMAL: February 13, 1979

The First Unitarian Church of Omaha, Nebraska is a Unitarian Universalist Church located at 3114 Harney Street in the Midtown area.

== History ==
First Unitarian Church of Omaha was incorporated on August 22, 1869, by twenty-six men and women. Its regular minister was Reverend Henry E. Bond, and its first chapel was a small brick building located at 17th and Cass that was dedicated in 1871. In the fall of 1889 Reverend Newton M. Mann came to serve the church. Mann was the first American minister to promote evolution.

The present Colonial Revival building at 31st and Harney was designed by Omaha architects John McDonald and his son Alan McDonald as their first joint project. Former U.S. president William Howard Taft, who was then president of the Unitarian Church Conference in the United States and Canada, presided at the 1917 cornerstone-laying ceremony. The building was dedicated in September 1918. In the 1930s, Sarah Joslyn gave the church its Aeolian-Skinner pipe organ.
