= Bradford–Pettis House =

Historic house in Nebraska, United States

- U.S. National Register of Historic Places
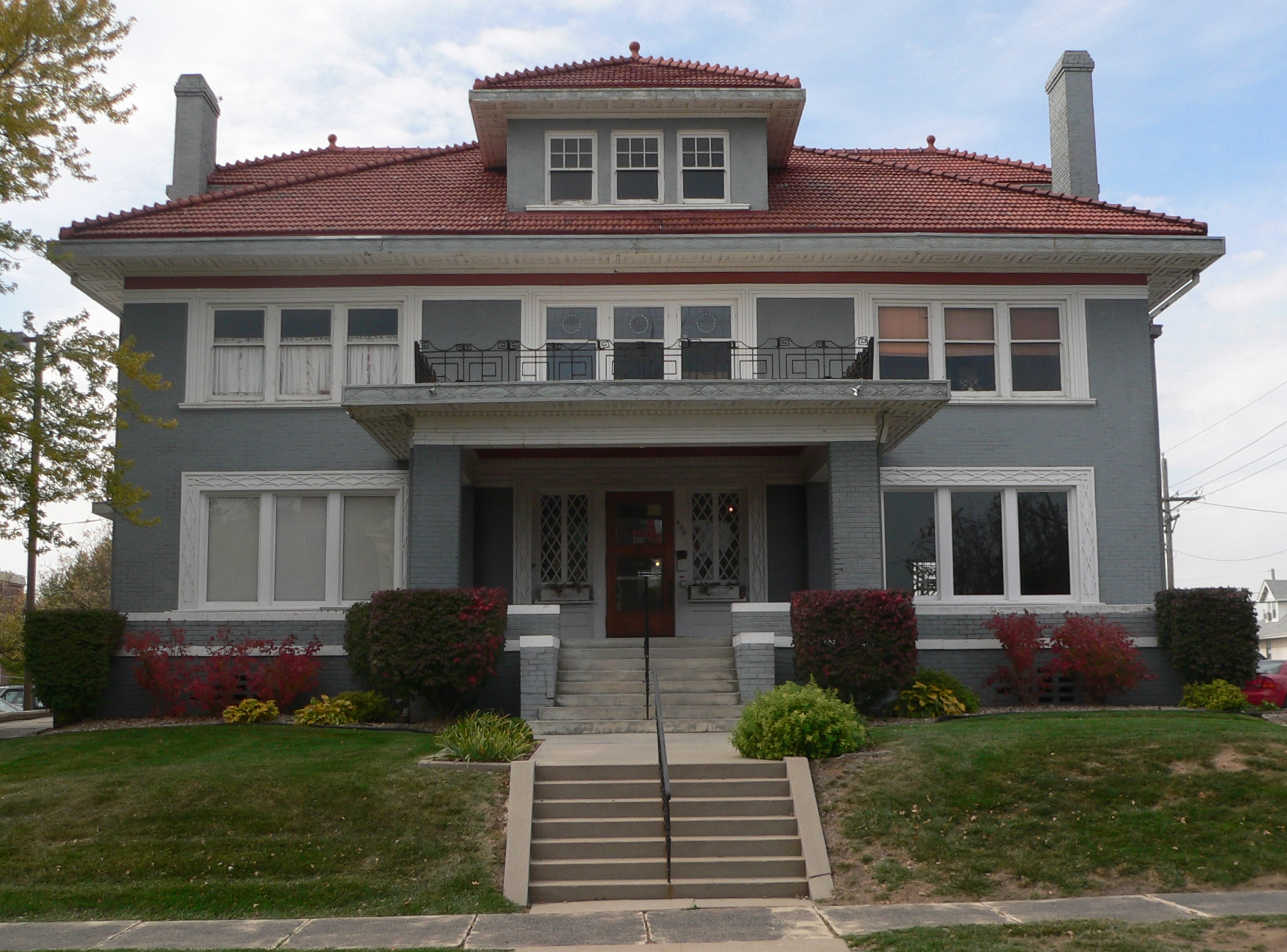
- View from the front (east)

- Location within Nebraska
- Location: Omaha, Nebraska
- Coordinates: 41°15′25.2″N 95°58′20″W
- Built: 1910
- Architect: John McDonald
- Architectural style: Prairie School, Georgian Revival, Pueblo
- NRHP reference No.: 83001090
- Added to NRHP: July 21, 1983

The Bradford–Pettis House is a historic house located at 400 South 39th Street in Midtown Omaha, Nebraska. It was designated an Omaha Landmark on February 26, 1980, and added to the National Register of Historic Places on July 21, 1983.

== About ==
The Bradford–Pettis House is a combination of Prairie School and Georgian Revival architecture. Interior amenities include leaded and stained glass, and inlaid wood and tile-faced fireplaces. It was originally designed in 1910 by Omaha-based architect, John McDonald, for the owner of one of the largest wholesale lumber businesses in the west in the early twentieth century, Dana C. Bradford. His firm was the Bradford-Kennedy Lumber Company. After his death in 1923, Bradford's widow, Savilla King Bradford, married Edward Fitch Pettis, the secretary-treasurer of the J. L. Brandeis and Sons Store. As her husband, Edward F. Pettis, was instrumental in the early development of the College World Series. Mrs. Bradford Pettis was a paternal aunt of Gerald R. Ford, Jr., who was born Leslie Lynch King, Jr. in Omaha in 1913.

The house later became an antiques store and a Montessori educational center. In 1964, Louis and Jack Drew renovated the residence to house their antiques business, Drew Antiques and Art Objects. In 1981, it became the House of Montessori. In 1982 the house was the Omaha Symphony's Designer Showhouse.
