= John McDonald (architect) =

Canadian-American architect (1861–1956)

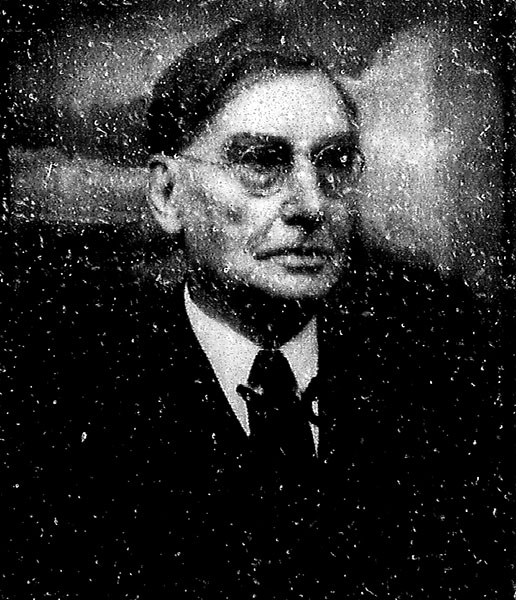
- McDonald c. 1938
- Born: April 22, 1861; Prince Edward Island, Canada
- Died: May 7, 1956 (aged 95); Omaha, Nebraska, United States
- Education: McGill University
- Occupation: Architect
- Years active: 1884–1955
- Spouse: Martha Tibbits
- Children: Alan McDonald
- Buildings: Joslyn Castle; Joslyn Memorial

John "Jack" McDonald was a Canadian-American architect who primarily practised in Omaha, Nebraska, from 1884 to 1955.

== Early life and education ==
McDonald was born on April 22, 1861, in Prince Edward Island, Canada, as the second of eleven children, all of whom were raised on the family farm. His parents were of Scottish descent. In 1880, McDonald was admitted into McGill University, Montreal, where he wrote his undergraduate thesis on municipal water systems. In mid 1883, he worked as a civil engineer for the Canadian Pacific Railway and in 1884, he earned a Bachelor of Applied Science in civil engineering before moving to Omaha.

== Career ==
Following his graduation from McGill, McDonald moved to Omaha in 1884. In 1886, he began a partnership with fellow architect and classmate David Ogilvy. Although Ogilvy moved to Portland, Oregon, in 1890, both continued to work together until 1892. McDonald and Ogilvy primarily worked on residential projects such as the Barker Building in downtown Omaha. In 1892, McDonald began working on the estate of his close friend George Joslyn. The estate, Lynhurst, now known as Joslyn Castle, was completed in 1903. McDonald simultaneously worked on the estate, the Nebraska and Apiary buildings for the Trans-Mississippi Exposition, and a number of residential projects during the turn-of-the-century Omaha housing boom.

In 1917 McDonald began partnering with his son, Alan McDonald. Their first joint project, First Unitarian Church of Omaha, was completed in 1916.

George Joslyn died in 1916 as the richest person in Nebraska. Following his death, the McDonalds and Joslyn's wife, Sarah, began work on Joslyn's memorial, which they originally conceived as a combination music hall and lecture facility. The project's scope was expanded to a temple to the arts, the Joslyn Memorial, now called the Joslyn Art Museum. The memorial was Inspired by the Nebraska State Capitol Building. The McDonalds designed the building in an Art Deco style, and added classical ornamentation and American Indian motifs, including the works of sculptor John David Brcin. The memorial building was constructed by the Kiewit Corporation and, after twelve years of planning and three years of construction, opened on November 29, 1931, to a crowd of between 25,000 and 30,000 people. McDonald retained a seat on the Joslyn Memorial's board of directors until he was in his 90s.

In 1947, Alan McDonald became ill and died of a heart attack at age 56. His father retired shortly after, closing the firm in 1950.

=== Selected works ===
- Joslyn Castle, 1893
- Nebraska and apiary buildings at the Trans-Mississippi and International Exposition, 1898
- Bradford–Pettis House, 1910
- Forest Lawn Memorial Park Chapel, 1913
- Hill Hotel, 1919
- Medical Arts Building, 1920
- First Unitarian Church, 1917
- Standard Oil Red Crown Service Station, 1922
- Benson High School, 1926
- Joslyn Memorial, 1931
- Beth El Synagogue, 1940
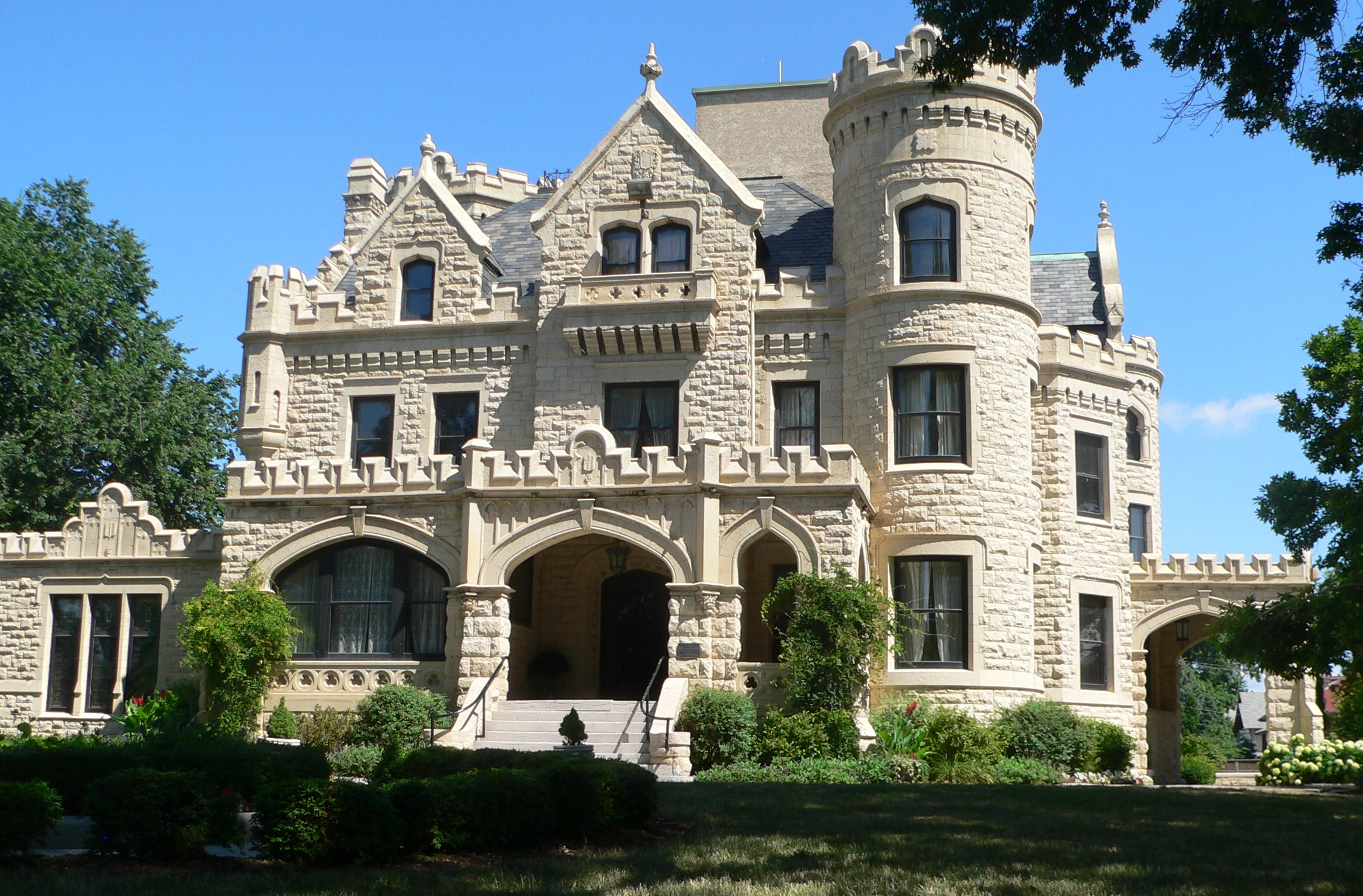
Joslyn Castle

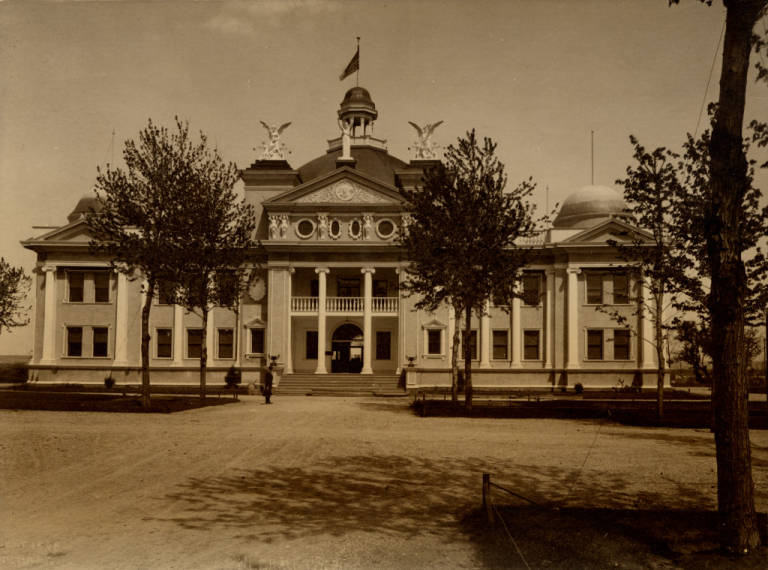
Nebraska building, 1898

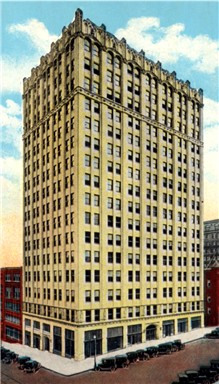
Medical Arts Building, demolished in 1999

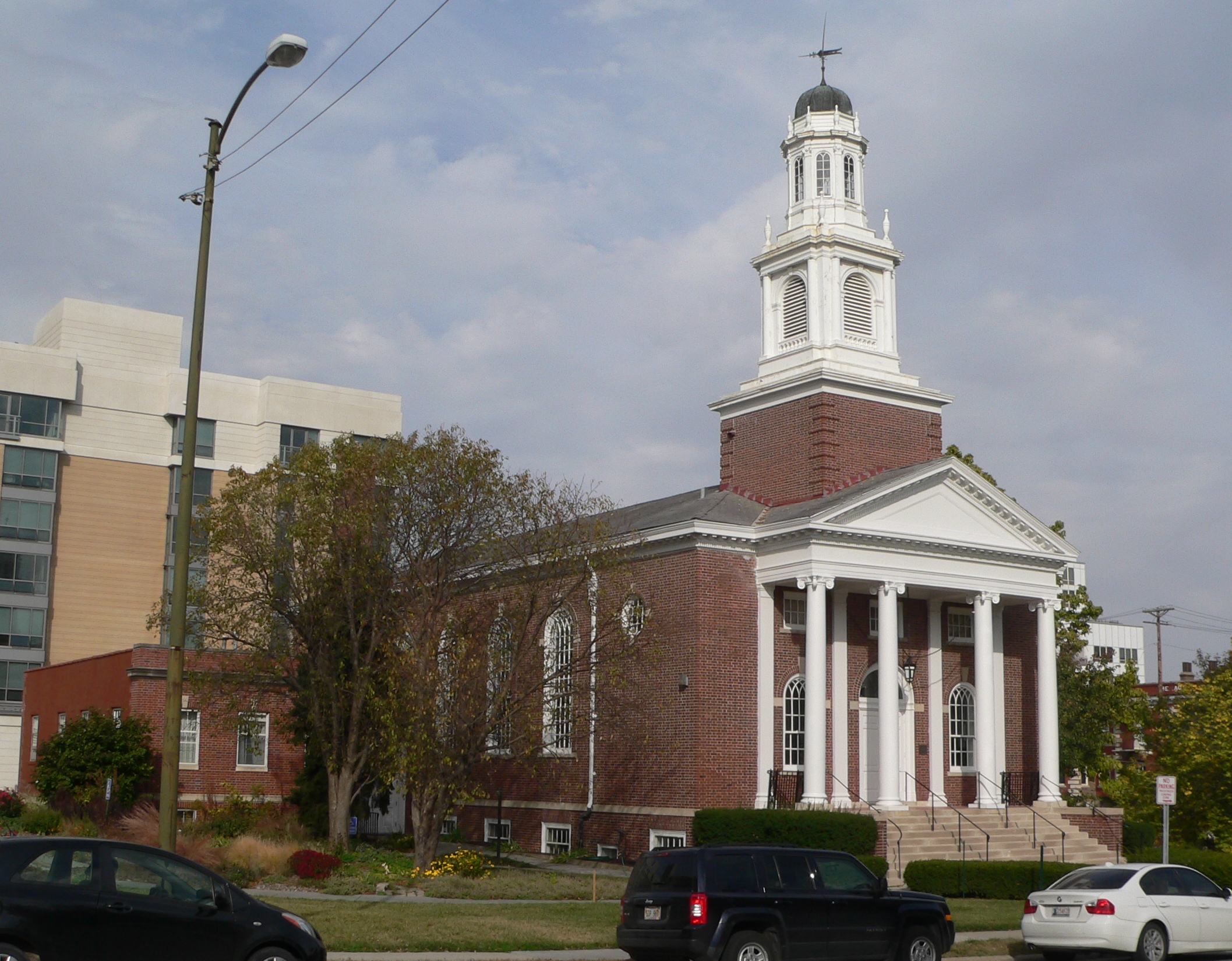
First Unitarian Church in the 21st century

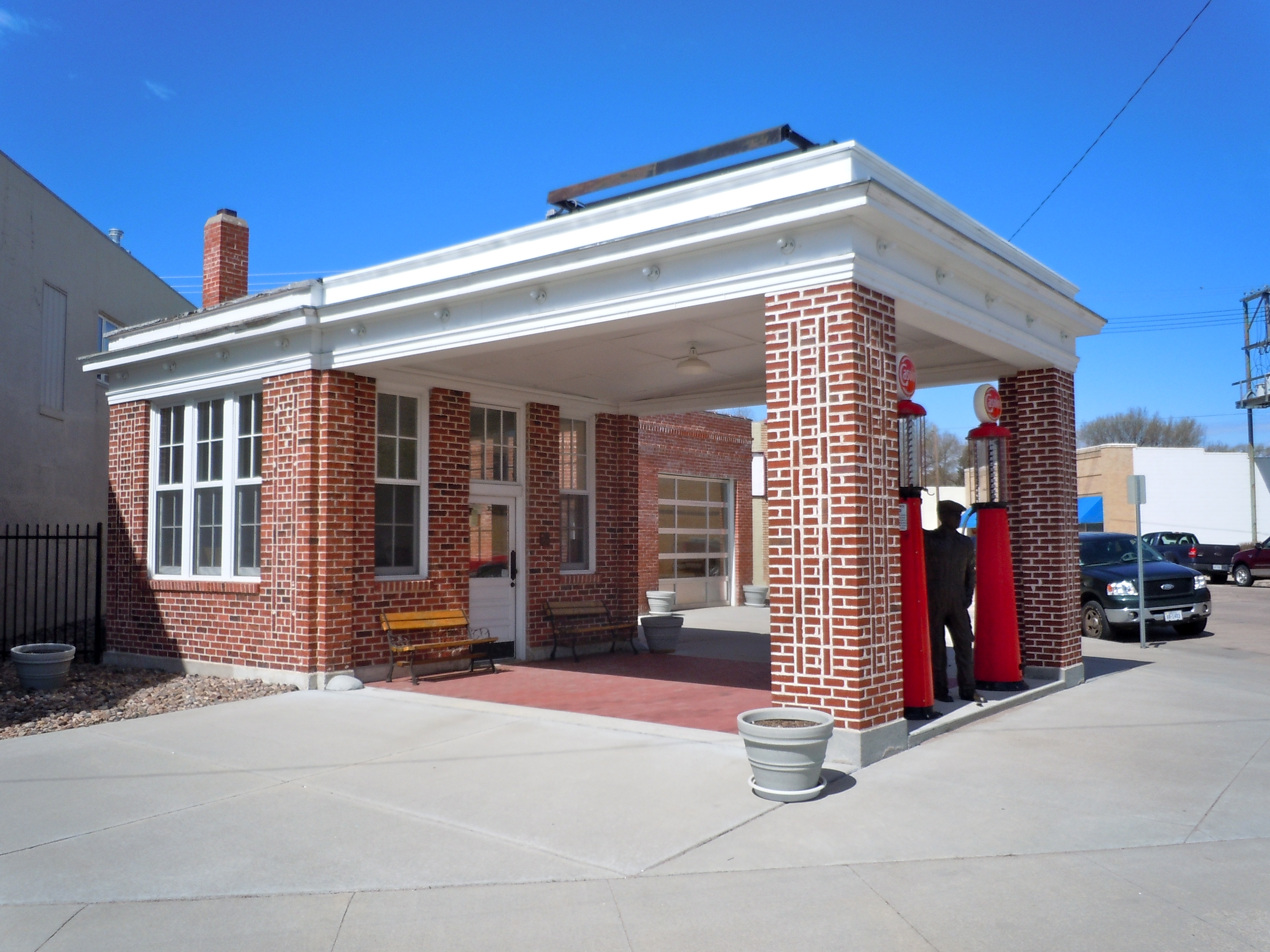
Red Crown Service Station in Ogallala, now a visitors' center

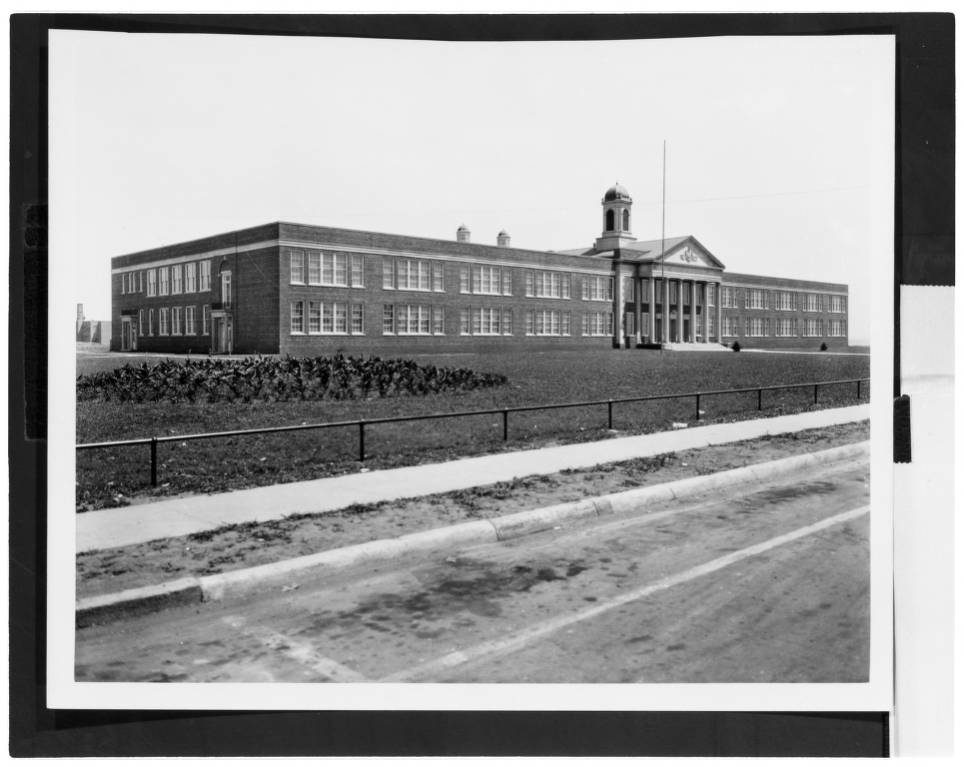
Benson High School the year of its completion

== Personal life and death ==
In 1890, John McDonald married 24-year-old law clerk Martha Tibbits. They moved to 3102 Woolworth Avenue in Hanscom Park. Their first and only child, Alan McDonald, was born in 1890.

McDonald remained close to his family in Canada, and eventually purchased two small farms on Prince Edward island for himself. He died in an Omaha hospital on May 7, 1956, and was interred at Forest Lawn Memorial Park, where the chapel he designed still stands.

== See also ==
- Architecture in Omaha, Nebraska
- List of people from Omaha, Nebraska
