= Joslyn Art Museum =

Art museum in Nebraska

Coordinates: 41.2603°N 95.9460°W

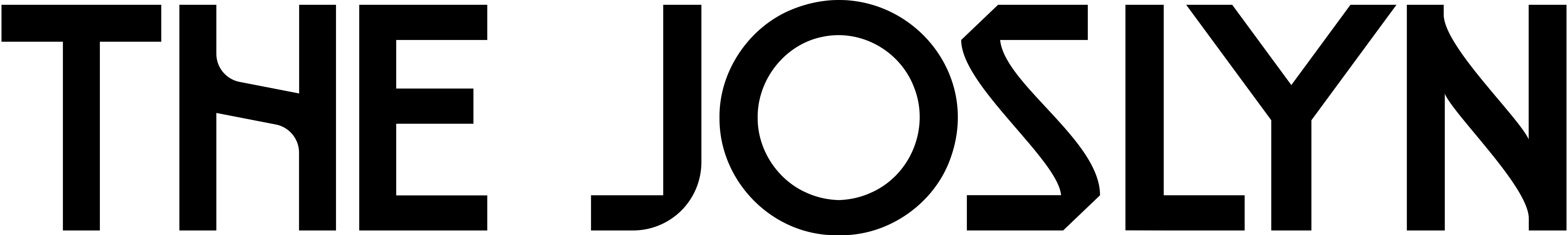

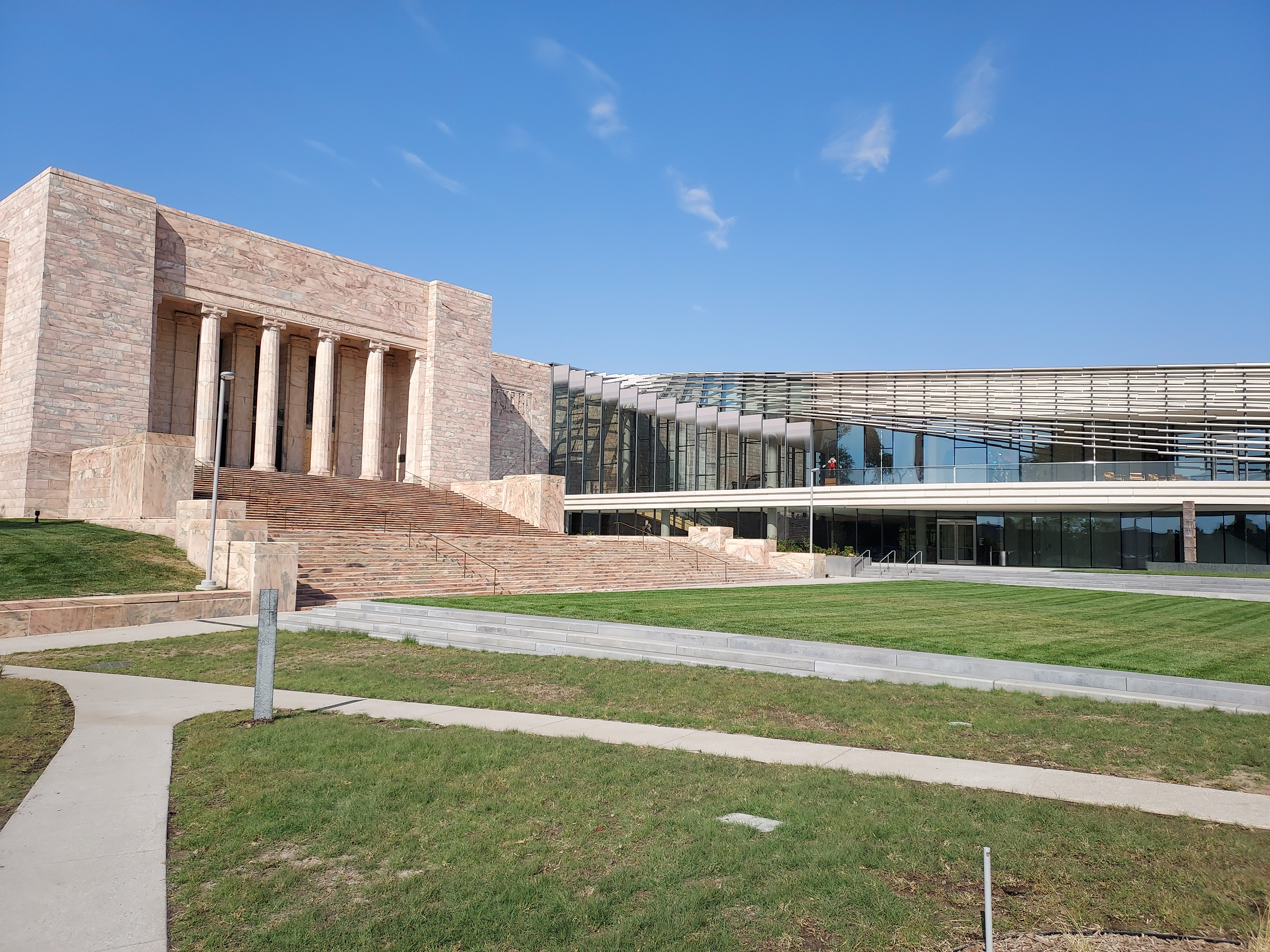
- Joslyn Building and Hawks Pavilion
- Interactive fullscreen map
- Established: 1931; 95 years ago
- Location: 2200 Dodge St; Omaha, Nebraska, U.S.
- Type: Art museum
- Collection size: 12,000 works
- Visitors: 206,500 (2025)
- Director: Jack F. Becker
- Architects: John and Alan McDonald (Original building); Norman Foster (Scott Pavillion); Craig Dykers (Hawks Pavilion)
- Website: joslyn.org

The Joslyn Art Museum, commonly referred to as the Joslyn, is a fine arts museum in Omaha, Nebraska, the largest in the state. It opened in 1931 at the initiative of Sarah H. Joslyn, in memory of her husband, businessman George A. Joslyn. Since its opening, the museum has gone through several expansions, the last of which was completed in 2024. It is the only museum in Nebraska with a comprehensive permanent collection, comprising over 12,000 objects, including nineteenth and twentieth-century collections of American and European art, Western American Art, Chinese and Japanese art, as well as contemporary art. The Joslyn is home to the Margre H. Durham Center for Western Studies, established in 1980, which stewards two of the most important collections of works by Western artists Karl Bodmer and Alfred Jacob Miller in the country.

== History ==
=== George and Sarah Joslyn ===
Originally from Vermont, George and Sarah Joslyn moved to Des Moines, Iowa in 1879 for George's new printing job at the Iowa Printing Company, which involved manual labor. In 1880, they went to Omaha, where George was to manage his own printing branch of the company. He then founded his own company, called the Western Newspaper Union, which soon became the largest supplier of "ready print" newspapers and provided news for 12,000 people within the United States. This is the period during which he gained most of his wealth. George was known as a philanthropist, but he was also considered a hard man of business in the Omaha community, and also considered an entrepreneurer.

As a couple, George and Sarah Joslyn were known to be great lovers of the arts, especially music. When George died in 1916 (as the richest man in Nebraska), Sarah decided she wanted a memorial building dedicated to his life and accomplishments, which would reflect their love for the arts. It would also serve as a gift to the people of Omaha and a way for the Joslyns to give back to the city that had given them so much. Sarah Joslyn founded and funded the nonprofit Society of Liberal Arts to find a permanent home for art collections in Omaha. When the Society of Liberal Arts was created, her intended purpose for it was to create and operate the Joslyn Memorial building; it would officially become the Joslyn Art Museum in 1987.

When Sarah Joslyn died in 1940, control of the Society of Liberal Arts passed to the trustees. The endowment she left to help maintain the museum was then also used to acquire new art and expand the museum's collection.

=== Building history ===
Kiewit started construction on the Joslyn Memorial building in 1928, but plans for the building started to come together much earlier, in 1920. Since the Joslyns were particularly fond of music, the building was initially designed as a concert hall. Art galleries were added at the suggestion of various arts groups throughout Omaha.

The Memorial occupies a large and impressive art deco building designed by John McDonald and Alan McDonald. John McDonald was a close friend to the Joslyns; before designing the Memorial, he designed their Scottish castle-like home, commonly known as the Joslyn Castle, along with several other public and residential buildings throughout Omaha. The impressive art deco facade of the building drew inspiration from Egyptian temples, art moderne motifs, and the Nebraska capitol building in Lincoln. The Memorial building is constructed of Georgia pink marble, with 38 different marbles from all over the world and stone from across Europe and Africa in the interior.

The decorative panels on the exterior were designed by sculptor John David Brcin, and refer to the peoples of the plains—both the original Native American inhabitants and the later European explorers and settlers. There are eight decorative panels in total around the outside of the building: Dissemination of Intelligence (front right), The Pioneer Press (front left), The Homesteaders (north), Civic Builders (south), Indian Signal Fire (north), Indian Prayer for Life (south), Indian Picture Writing (back north), and Indian Sign Language (back south). The inscriptions carved on the building were written by Hartley Burr Alexander. Sarah gave $2.6 million for the construction of the Memorial building, and an endowment for its continued maintenance.

The Joslyn Memorial building opened on November 29, 1931 and consisted of various art galleries, a concert hall, a lecture hall, an art library, classrooms, and an atrium with a fountain. At Sarah Joslyn's request, the opening was commemorated with no fanfare. There was no opening speeches or ribbon cutting, and Sarah Joslyn herself watched from the street. Nevertheless, the opening was attended by an estimated 25-30,000 people. In 1938, the Memorial was listed as one of the one hundred finest buildings in the United States. Several decades after the Memorial building opened to the public, it was running out of space for staff and the growing collection. Eugene Kingman, the director of the Joslyn during the 1960s, wanted the Joslyn to be the "Smithsonian of Omaha," a place where science and the arts could come together. With this idea in mind, he wanted to expand the Memorial and construct additional buildings, which would include a science museum and a planetarium. Lack of funds for the project and Kingman's departure in 1969 put an end to this plan. However, Kingman saved quite a bit of historical material as part of his vision for the Memorial, which was later donated to historical museums around Omaha. After his departure, the Joslyn Memorial returned to a strong focus on the arts.

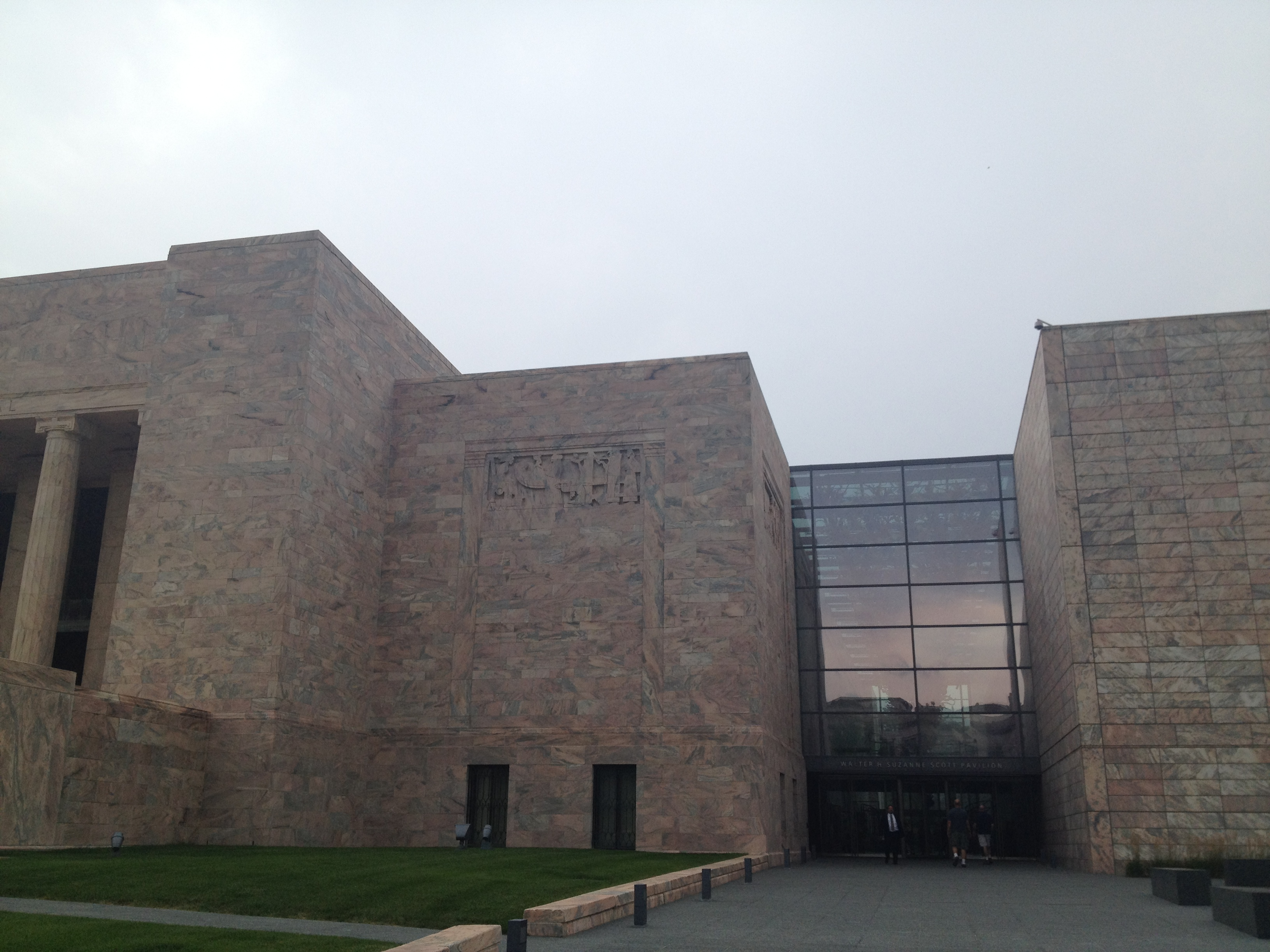
The Walter & Suzanne Scott Pavilion, seen in 2012

Even though there was still no expansion of the memorial building, in 1987 the Joslyn Memorial participated in a land exchange with Omaha Central High School. Through this exchange the Joslyn acquired land to the east of the memorial building to add a sculpture garden and expand parking, while the high school gained land to the northeast where a new football stadium was constructed.In 1994, the first addition to the Joslyn Art Museum was finally built. Designed by Lord Norman Foster, and included the Scott Pavilion. HDR Inc. and the Kiewit construction company worked together to build this addition. The exterior of the 1994 addition used pink Georgian marble from the same quarry as the original Memorial building, to make the addition look like a part of the original structure. A development campaign for the Joslyn Museum and the Western Heritage Museum (Durham Museum) ensured that there was plenty of money to construct this long-awaited addition to the museum. The $15.95 million budget included modern art acquisitions, visiting show galleries, a cafe, a kitchen, offices, storage space, a security control center, classroom space, and a beautiful glass atrium that connects the new addition to the Memorial building. Aside from the 1994 addition, sections of the memorial building were updated as part of the project, such as the restrooms, concert hall, and lecture hall.

In 2008, construction began on the Joslyn Museum Sculpture Gardens, which would better utilize the space received in the 1987 land exchange. The gardens opened in the summer of 2009, featuring work from local and national artists as well as a reflecting pool and waterfall. Shortly after its opening, the garden hosted the 24th annual Jazz on the Green festival; it continued to host that event until 2010, when Omaha Performing Arts began producing it. It was then moved it to the Midtown Crossing at Turner Park.

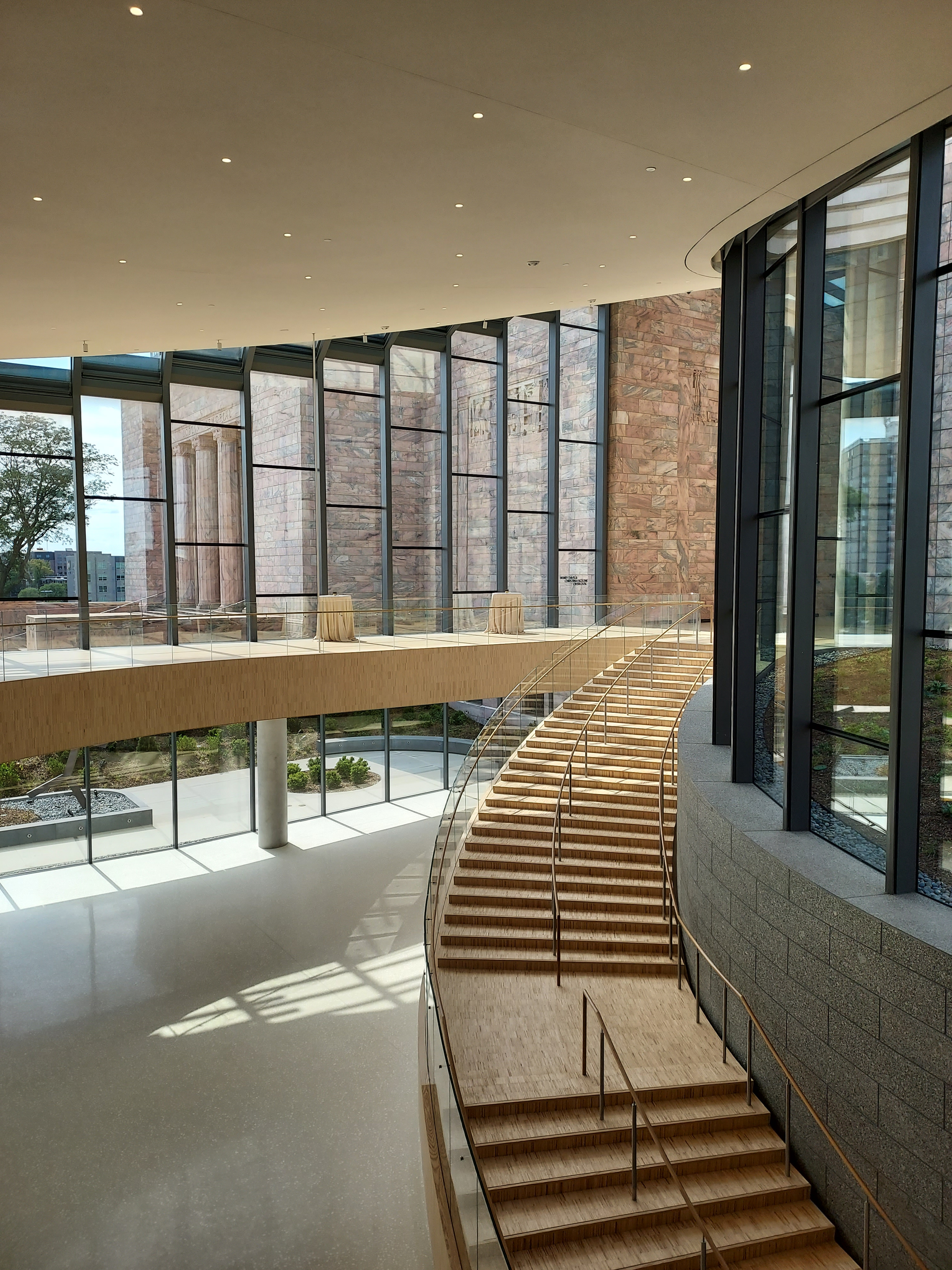
The museum's entry atrium, in Hawks Pavilion.

Announced in 2018, the most recent addition to the Joslyn Art Museum, the Rhonda and Howard Hawks Pavilion, has added 42,000 sq. ft. of space to the museum. The museum closed for construction of the new addition in May 2022 and reopened in September 2024. The architecture firm Snøhetta and local architecture company Alley Poyner Macchietto Architecture worked together to design the new addition. This new space includes galleries, classrooms, a new gift shop, and multi-purpose community rooms. As with the original Memorial building and the 1994 addition, Kiewit Building Group served as the contractor for the project. Along with the new building space, the gardens and outdoor spaces surrounding the museum were revamped. The exterior of the Rhonda and Howard Hawks Pavilion resembles a cloud, reflecting the original theme of the Great Plains. The addition also created a new entrance to the museum, allowing visitors to access the rest of the museum through the Pavilion.

== Admissions ==
At its opening in 1931, the Memorial was to be an admission-free facility. Free admission continued until 1965, when an entry fee of 25 cents per person was instituted. As time went on the price of admission continued to rise; in 1987, it was two dollars for adults, while children and seniors paid one dollar. In 2010, admission went up to eight dollars per adult. In 2013, however, the museum moved back to its original vision of free admission. This change was made possible through a three-year grant from the Sherwood Foundation Grant; the Foundation believed that the Joslyn would be able to make up the funds from paid admissions in other ways once the grant concluded, as admission fees only represented 2–4% of the museum's overall revenue. As of the museum's reopening in 2024, admission remained free.

== Collections ==
When the Joslyn Memorial first opened, there was a need for art to fill the galleries. The Art Institute of Omaha and the Friends of Art donated paintings. Nettie Fowler Dietz, wife of a local business owner, donated her personal collection in 1934, and Jessie Barton Christiancy bequested her collection and that of her late father, the industrialist Guy Conger Barton, to the museum. These were some of the first groups and people to donate collections to the Joslyn. After Sarah's death, Paul Grummann, who was the director from 1931–1947, and Harold Parsons purchased European art for the Memorial. When Eugene Kingman took over as director in 1947, he expanded the Greek vase collection as well as art and artifacts from Indigenous cultures. In 1986 the Karl Bodmer collection, initially on loan to the museum, was donated and became part of the permanent collection. In recent years, the Joslyn has continued to expand its collections, particularly the contemporary and modern, with the acquisition of the collection of Omaha manufacturer Phillip G. Schrager, housed in the Hawks Pavilion.

=== Permanent collection ===
The Joslyn Art Museum permanent collection includes:

- Ancient: A collection of Greek pottery and various statues of Greek, Roman and Egyptian origin.
- European: 16th- and 17th-century works, including paintings by Veronese, Titian, Claude Lorrain, Rembrandt and El Greco. The 19th century collection includes Romantic works by Delacroix and Gustave Doré, realist works by Jean-Baptiste-Camille Corot, William-Adolphe Bouguereau, and Gustave Courbet, and impressionist works by Degas, Monet, Pissarro, and Renoir.
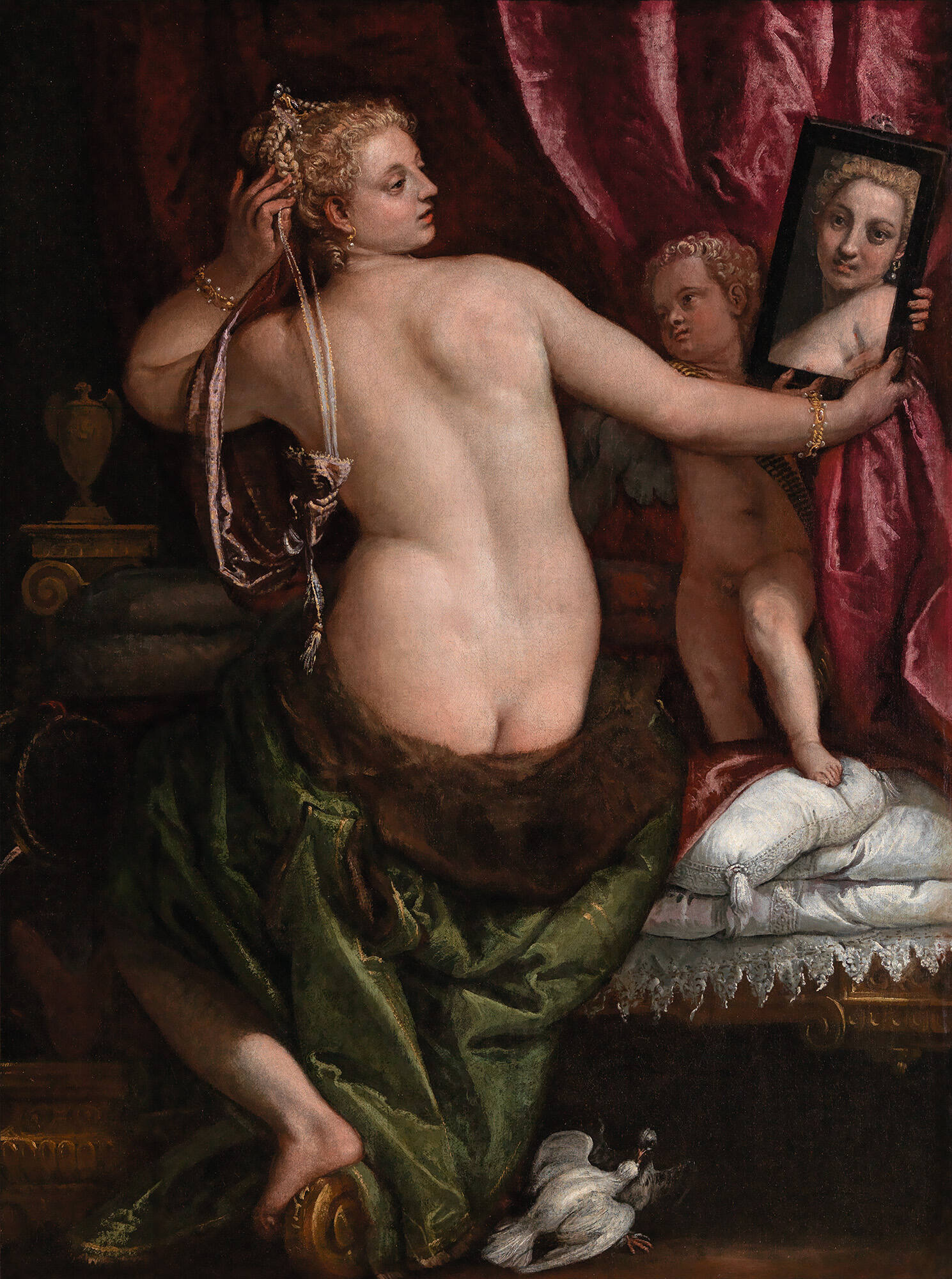
Paolo Caliari, called Paolo Veronese, Venus with a Mirror, 1580s

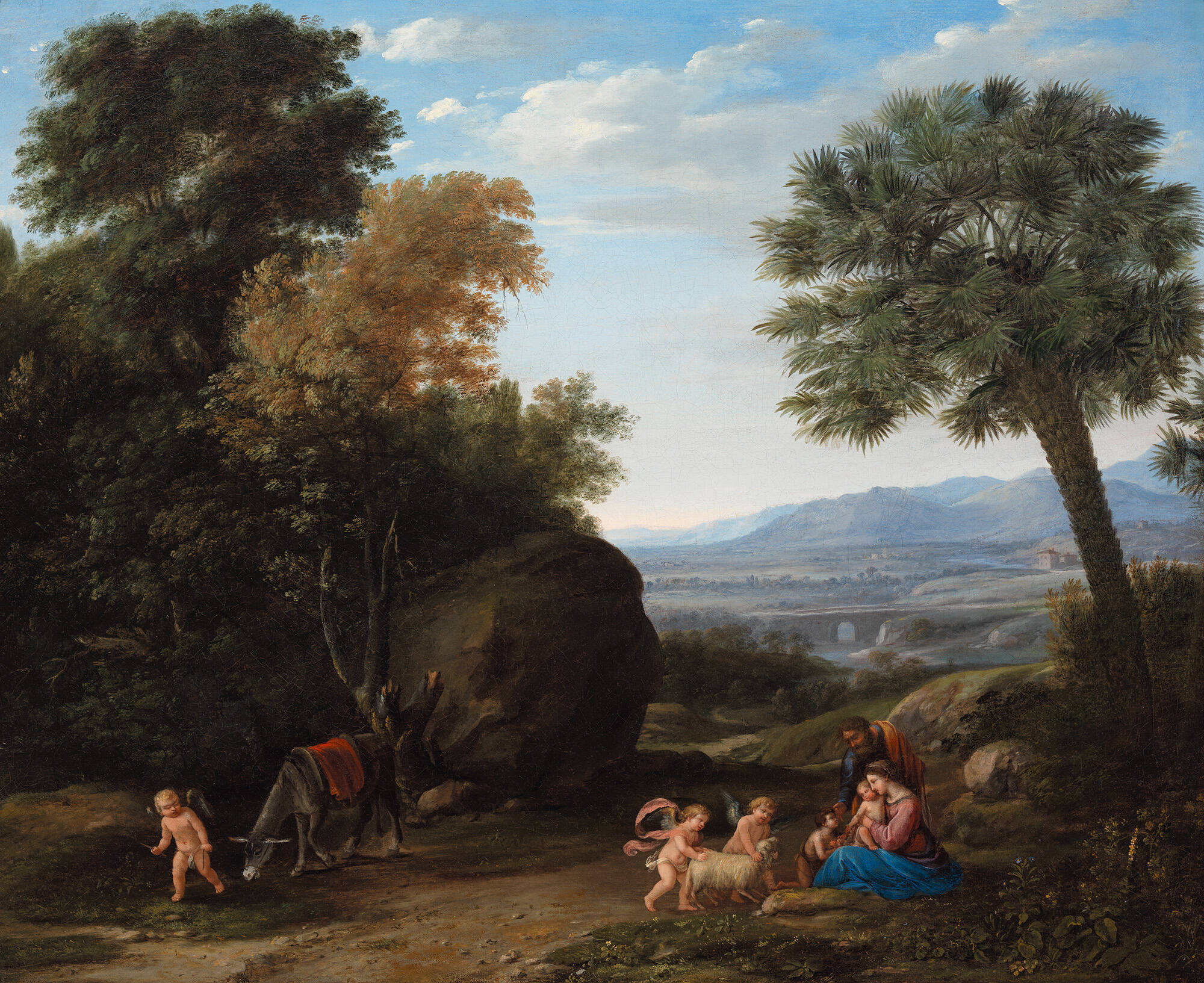
Claude Gellée, called Claude Lorrain, Rest on the Flight into Egypt, c. 1640

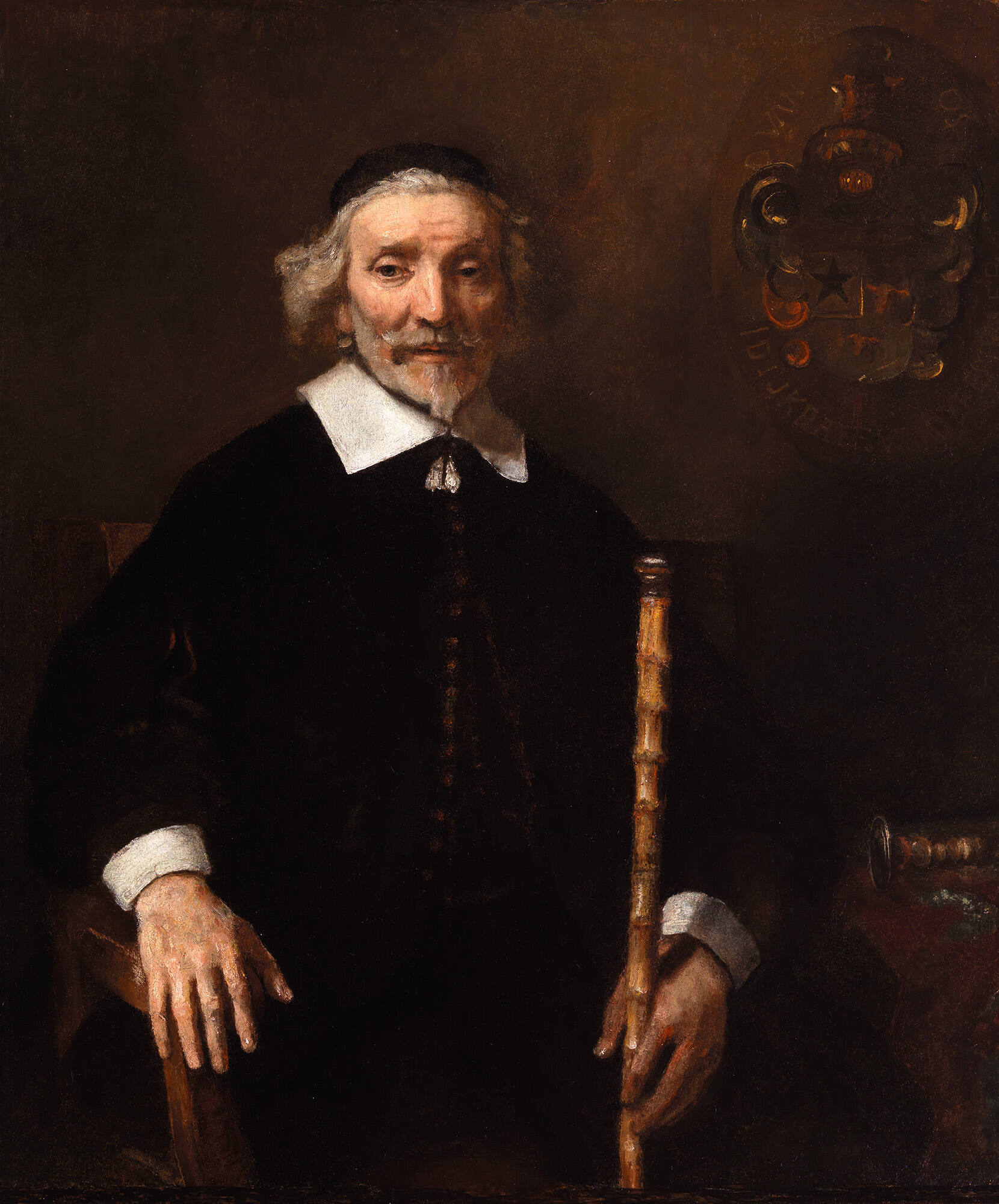
Rembrandt van Rijn, Portrait of Dirck van Os, c. 1658

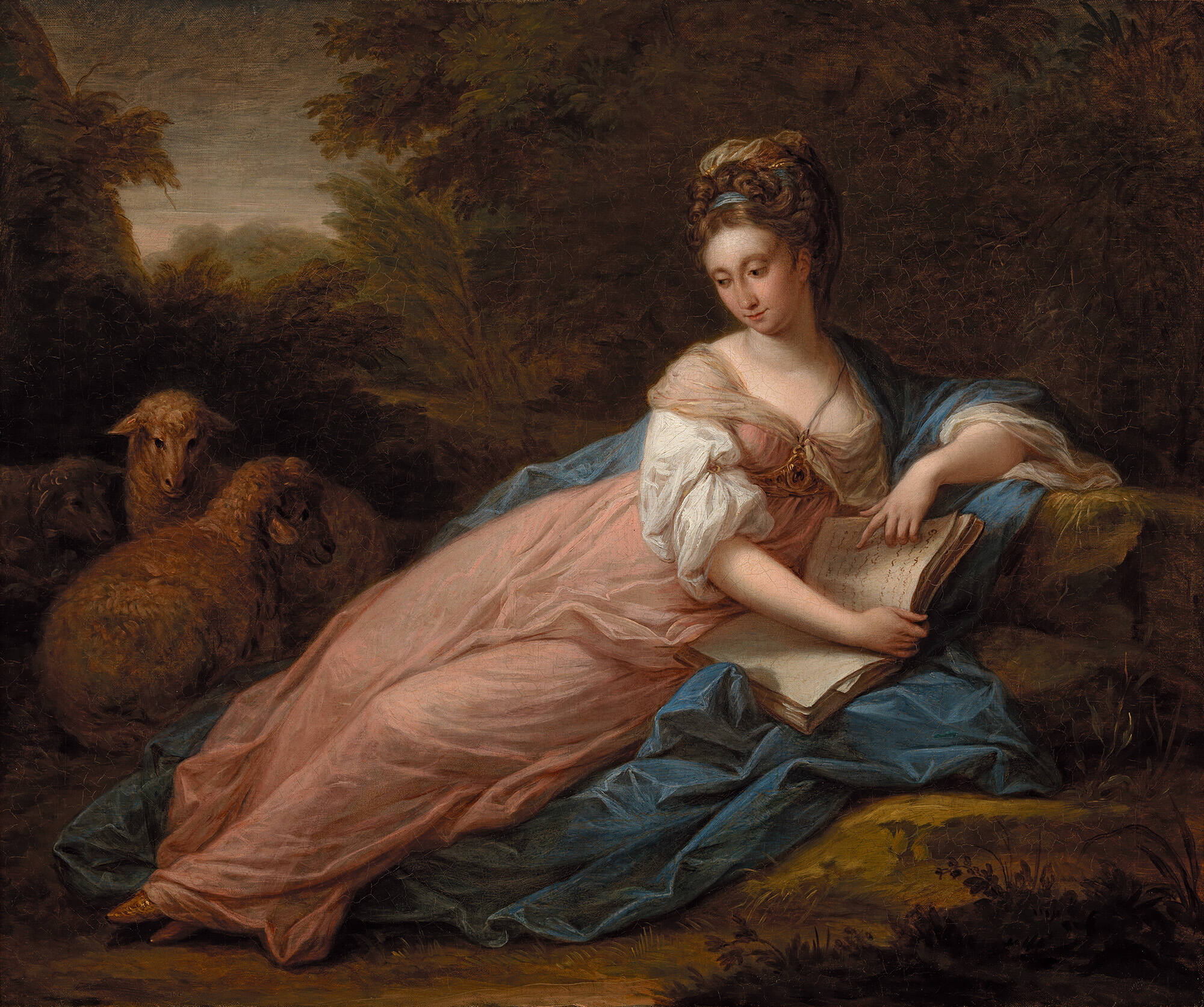
Angelica Kauffmann, A Portrait of Mary Tisdal Reading, c. 1771-72

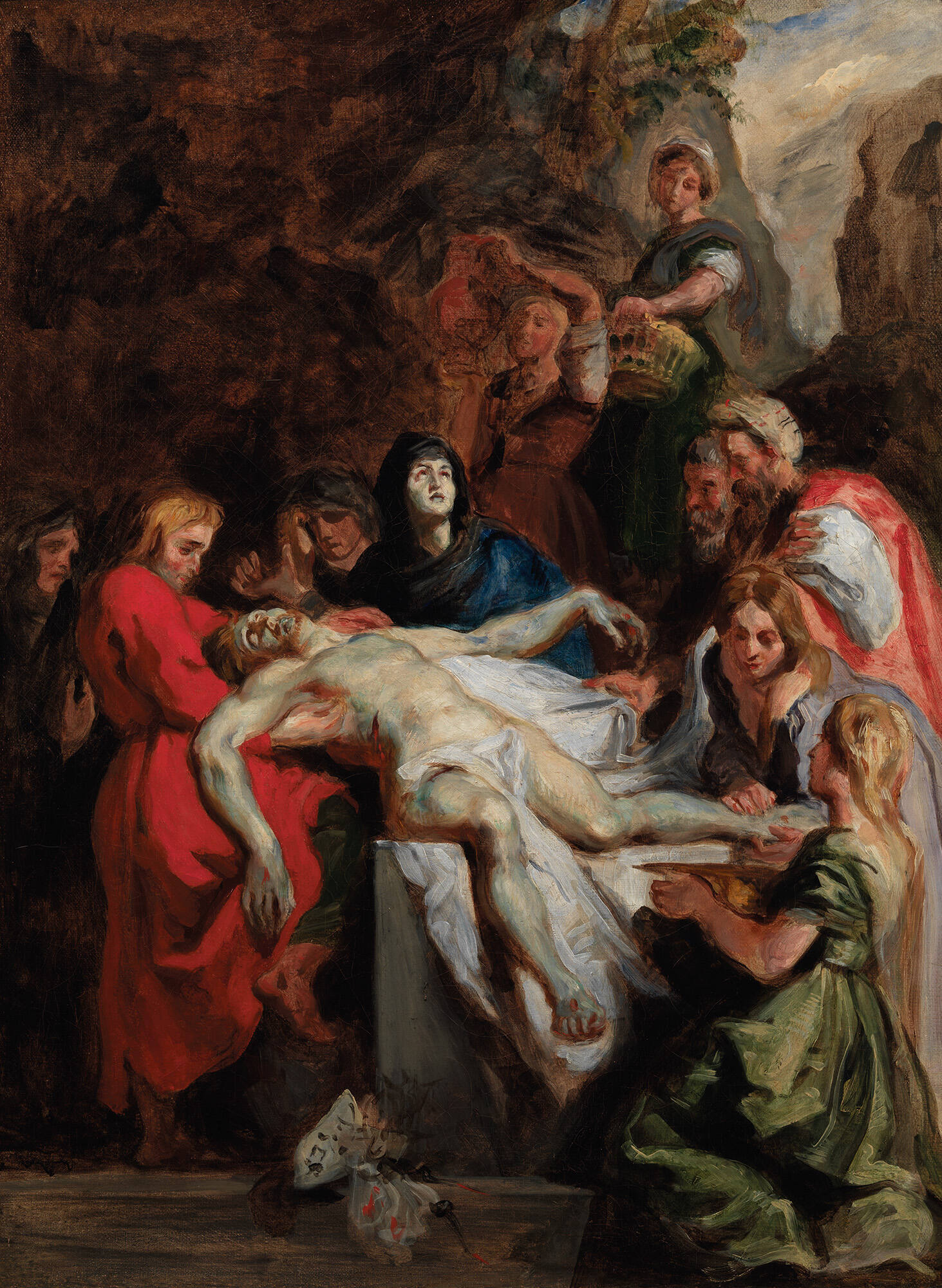
Eugène Delacroix, The Entombment (after Peter Paul Rubens), 1836

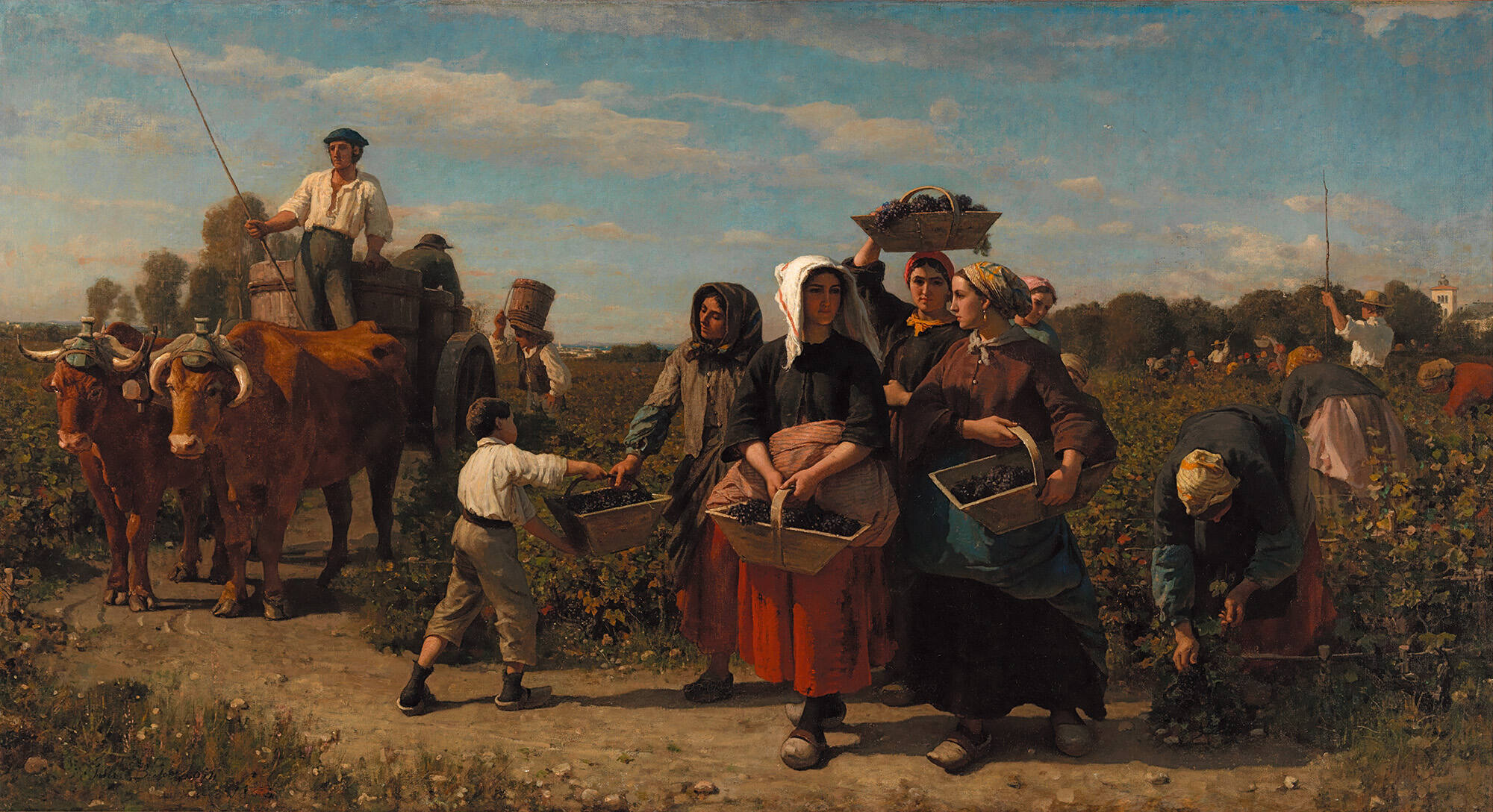
Jules Breton, The Vintage at Château Lagrange, 1864

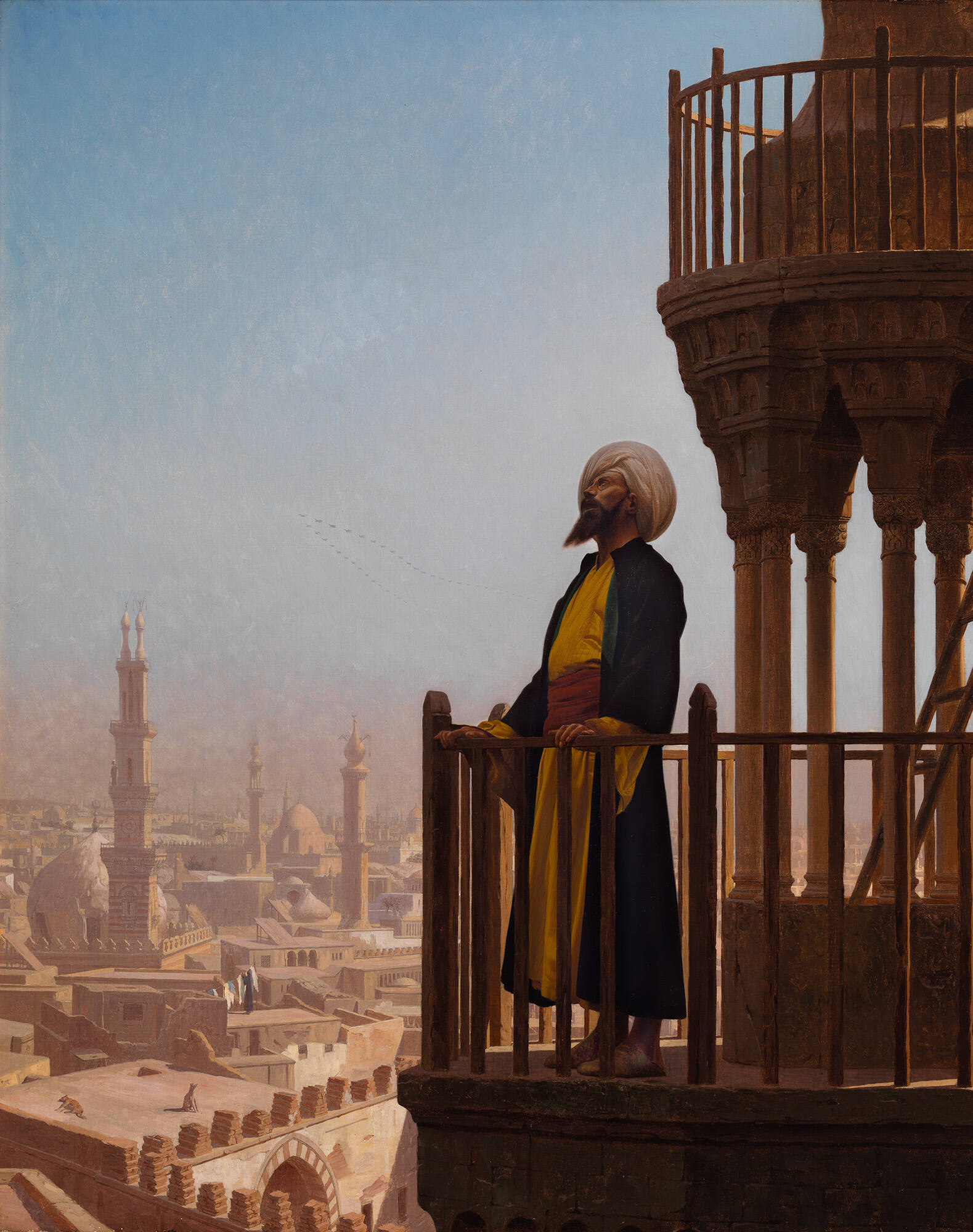
Jean-Léon Gérôme, The Muezzin, 1865

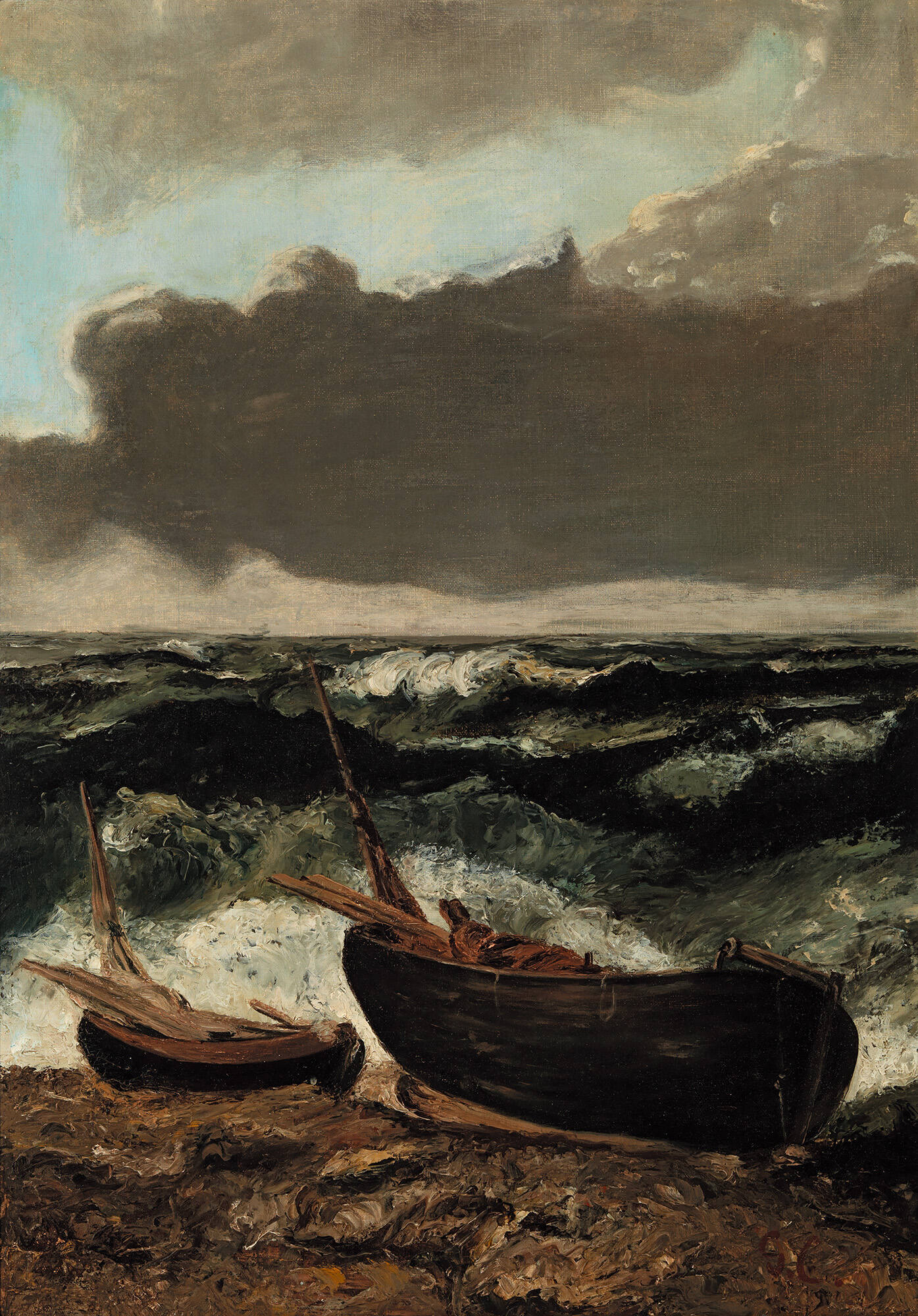
Gustave Courbet, Coast Scene-Approaching Storm, c. 1870

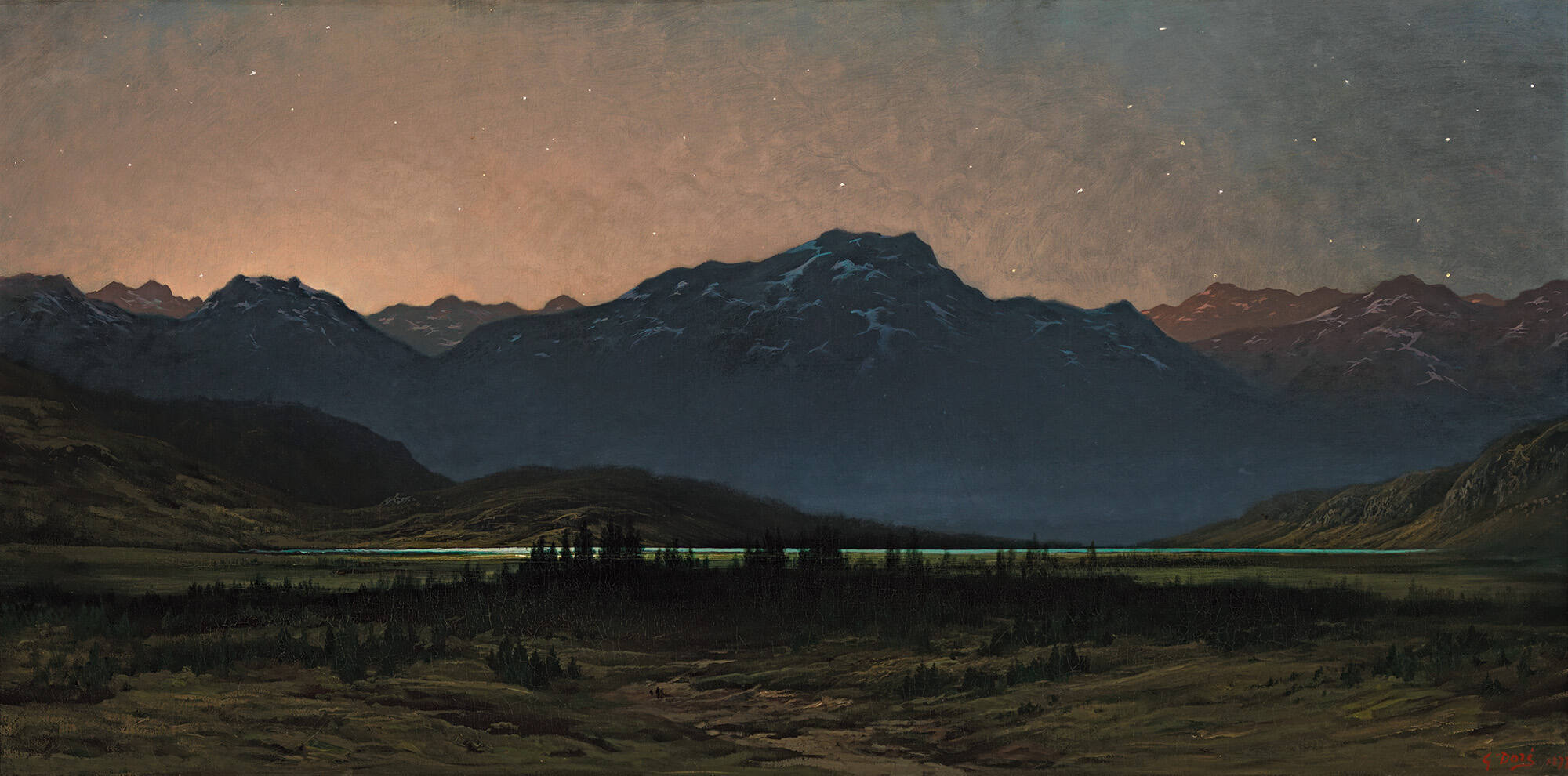
Gustave Doré, Mountain Landscape, 1877

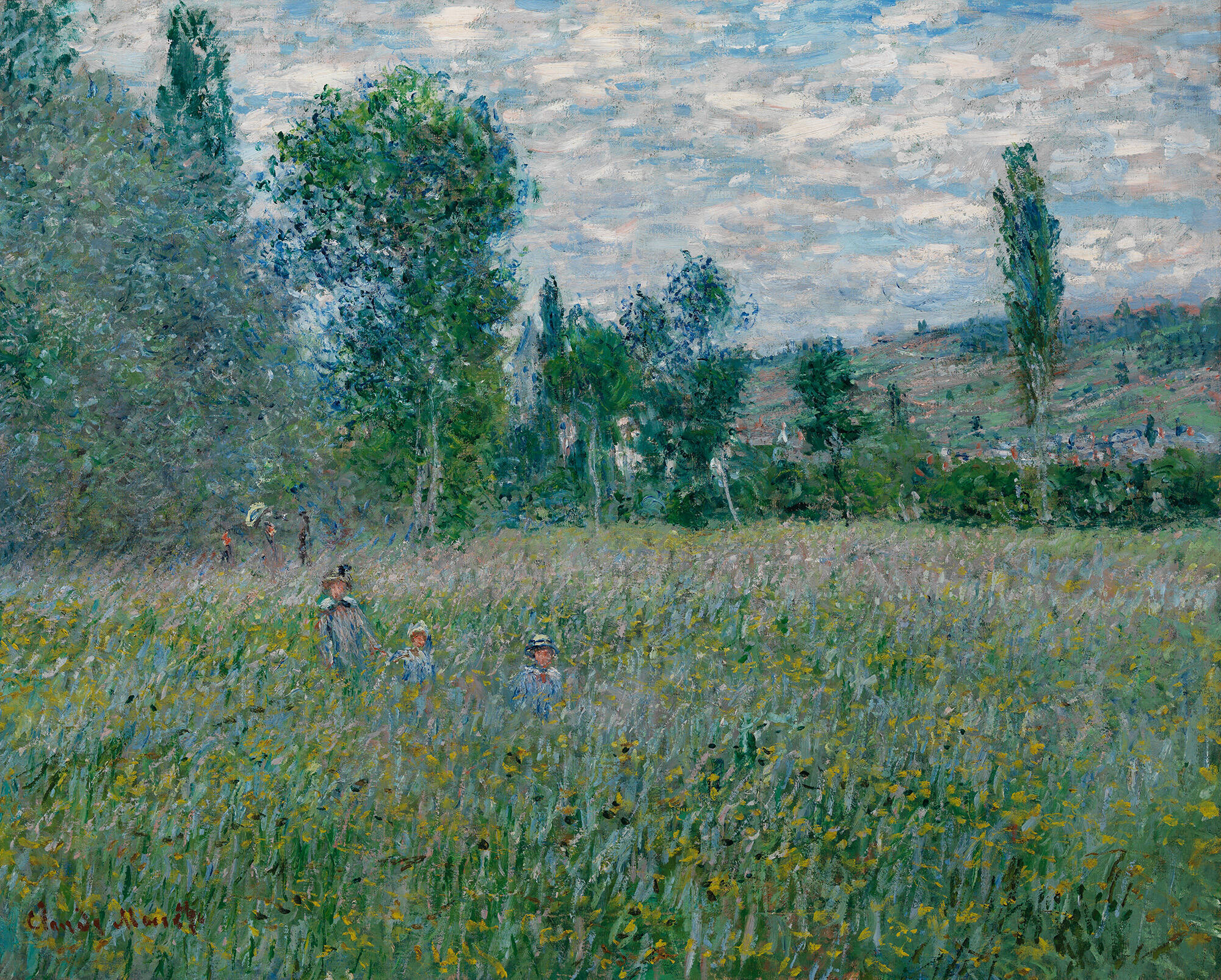
Claude Monet, The Meadow, 1879

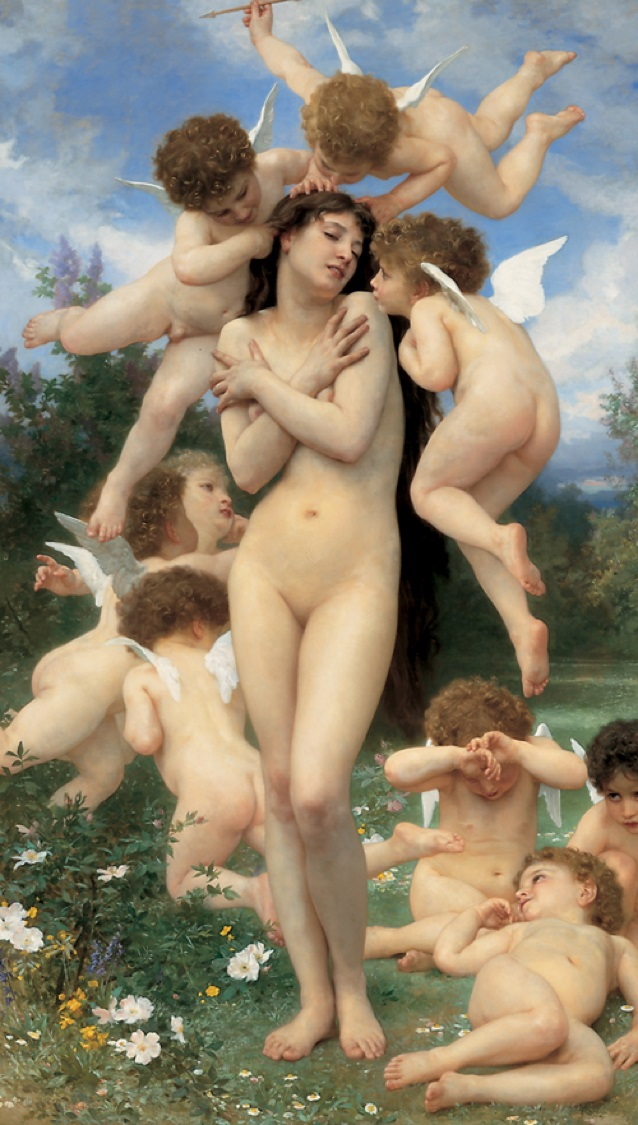
William-Adolphe Bouguereau, The Return of Spring, 1886

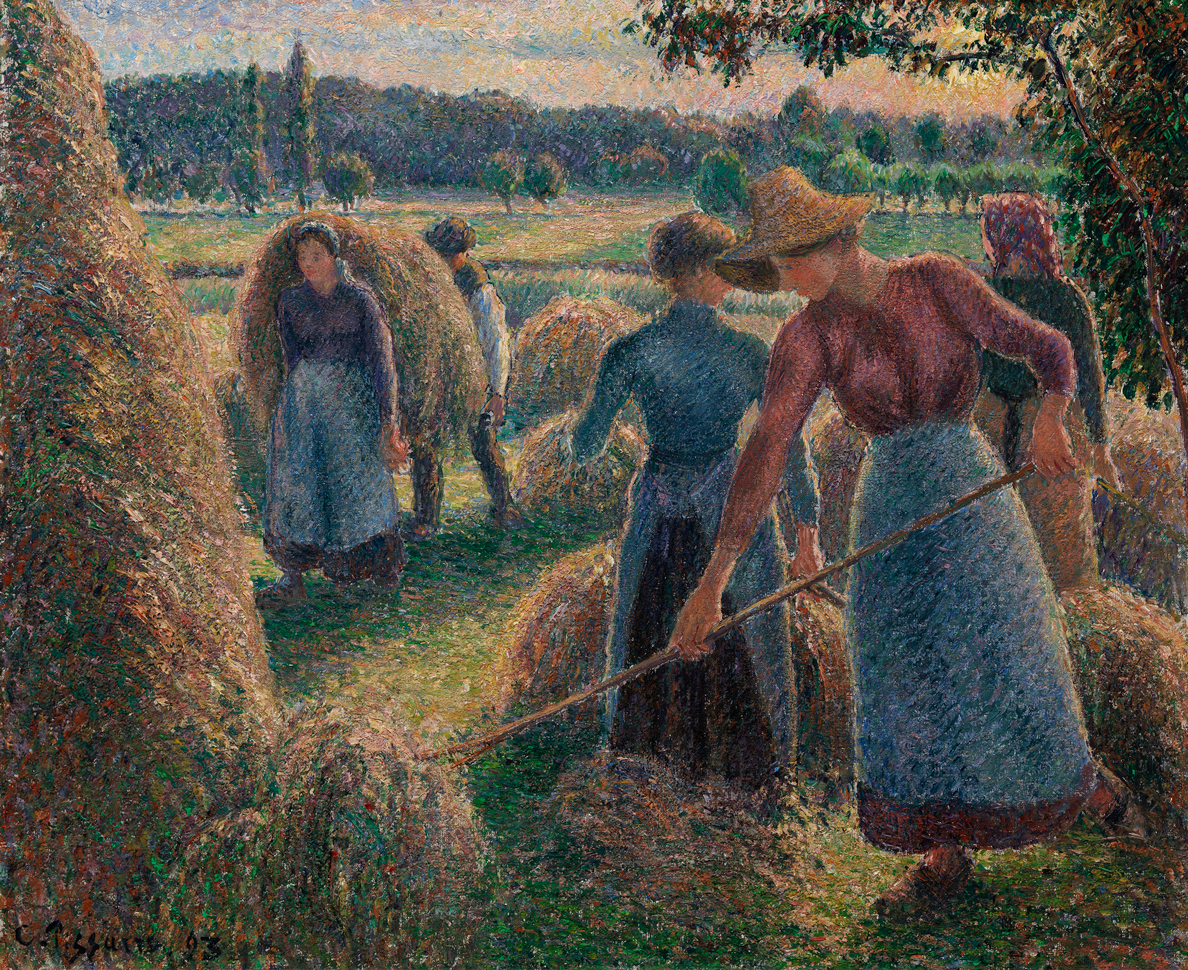
Camille Pissarro, Haymakers, Evening, Éragny, 1893
- American: Early American portraiture; works by painters of the Hudson River School, including Thomas Cole; 19th and early-20th-century landscape art by artists Thomas Moran, Albert Bierstadt, and Robert S. Duncanson; realist works by Winslow Homer and Thomas Eakins, works by the American impressionists Childe Hassam, Mary Cassatt, and William Merritt Chase; early-20th-century Ashcan School paintings by John Sloan, George Bellows, and Robert Henri; and Regionalist paintings by Grant Wood, Thomas Hart Benton, John Steuart Curry, and Terence Romaine von Duren.
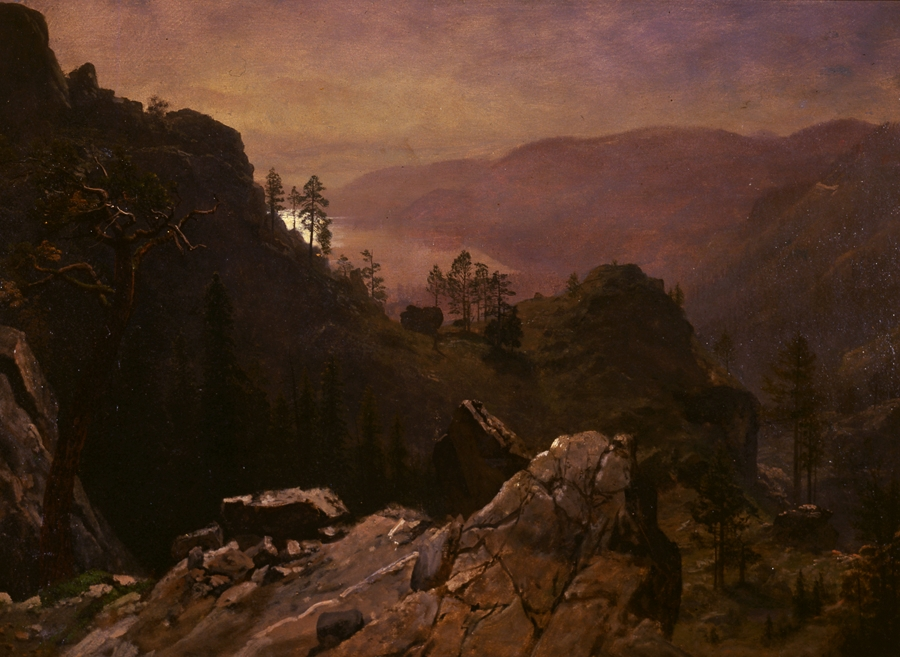
Albert Bierstadt, Dawn at Donner Lake, California, c. 1871–73

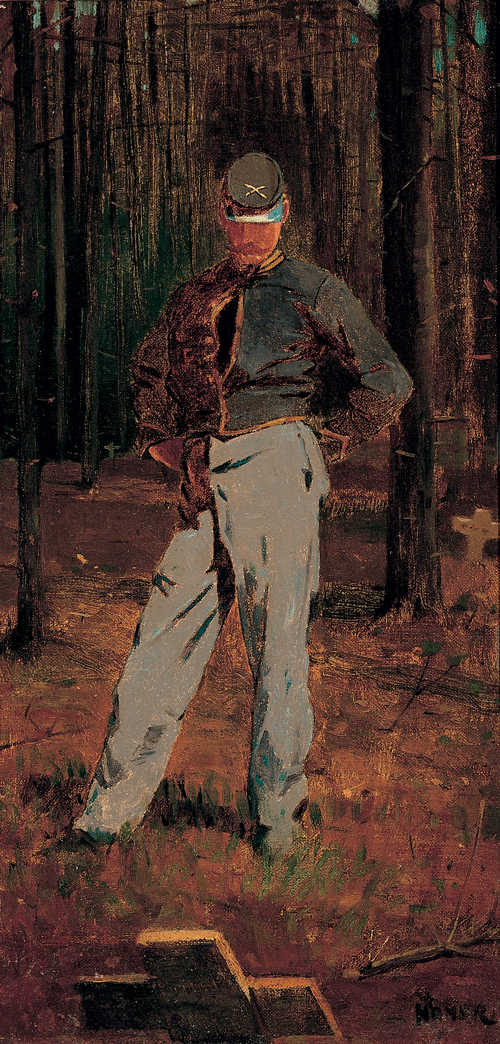
Winslow Homer, Trooper Meditating Beside a Grave, c. 1865

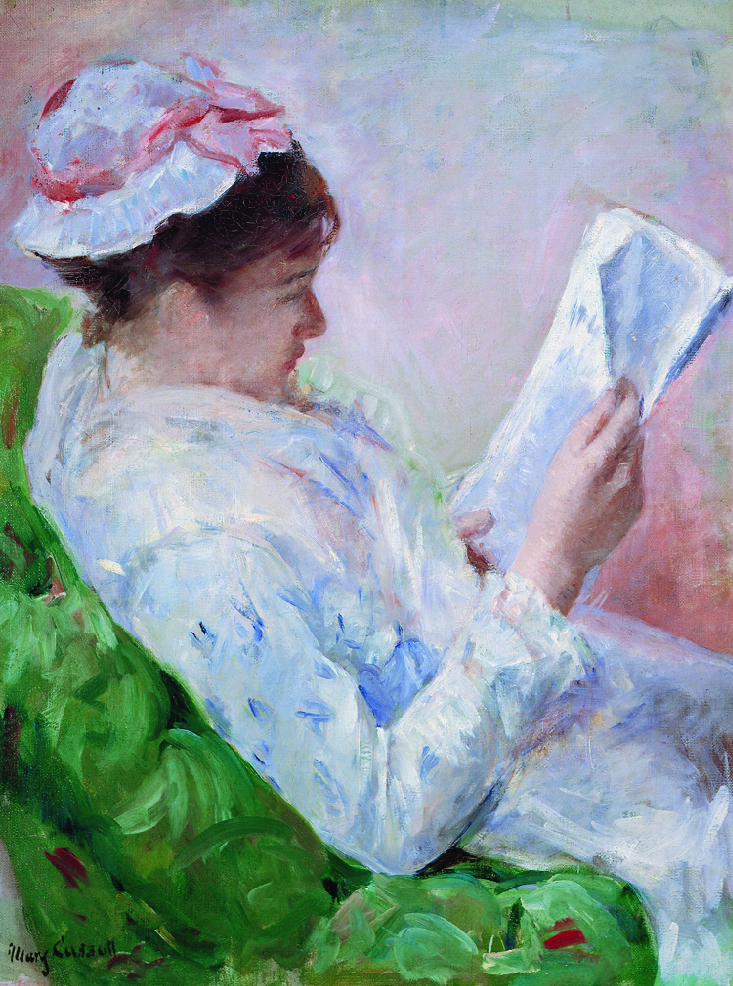
Mary Cassatt, Woman Reading, 1878-79

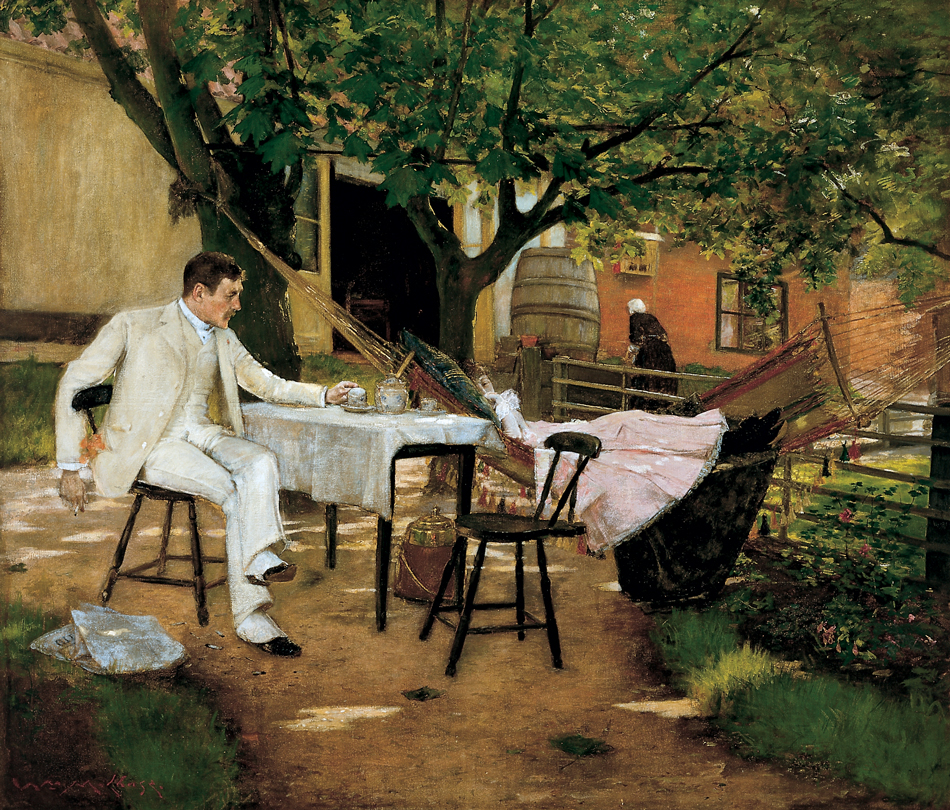
William Merritt Chase, Sunlight and Shadow, 1884

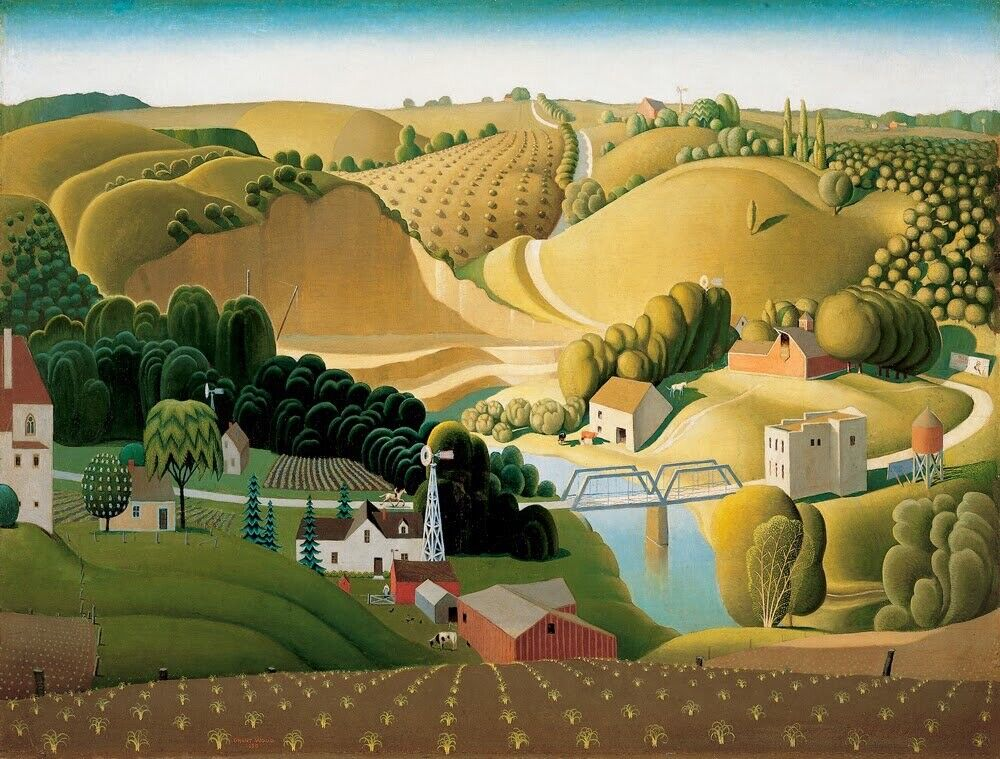
Grant Wood, Stone City, Iowa, 1930

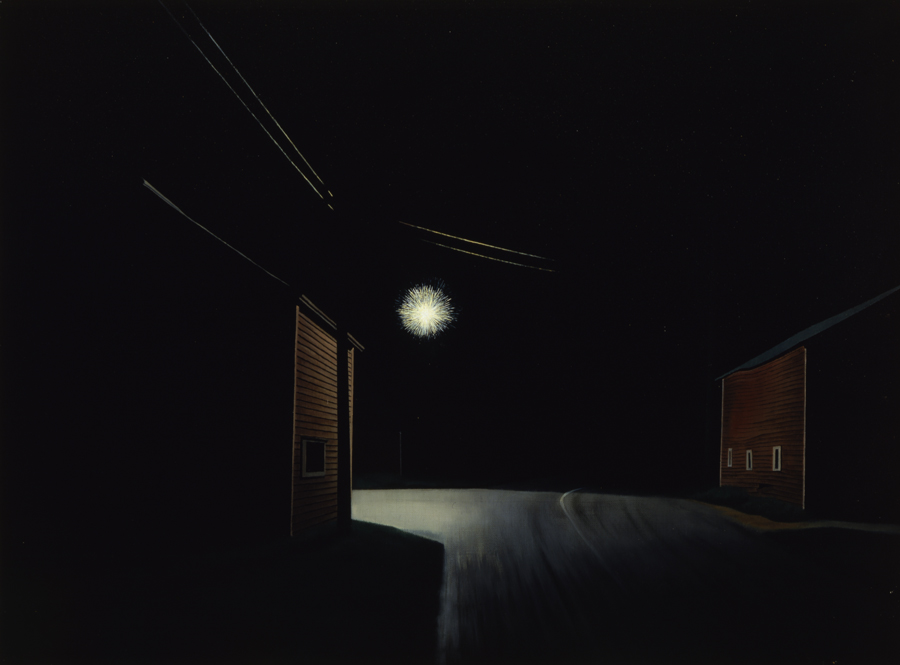
George Ault, August Night at Russell's Corners, 1948
- Native American: Both traditional works and art done under the influence of, or in reaction against, European conventions and training.
- Art of the American West: 269 watercolor paintings, 117 drawings, and more than 200 North American prints by the Swiss artist Karl Bodmer from his 1832–34 journey to the Missouri River frontier with the German Prince Maximilian of Wied-Neuwied, the largest collection of Bodmer's works in the United States, donated in 1986 by Omaha energy company InterNorth; over 110 works by painter Alfred Jacob Miller, illustrating the West in the 1830s, constituting the third largest collection of works by Miller in the United States, behind the Walters Art Museum in Baltimore and the Gilcrease Museum in Tulsa.
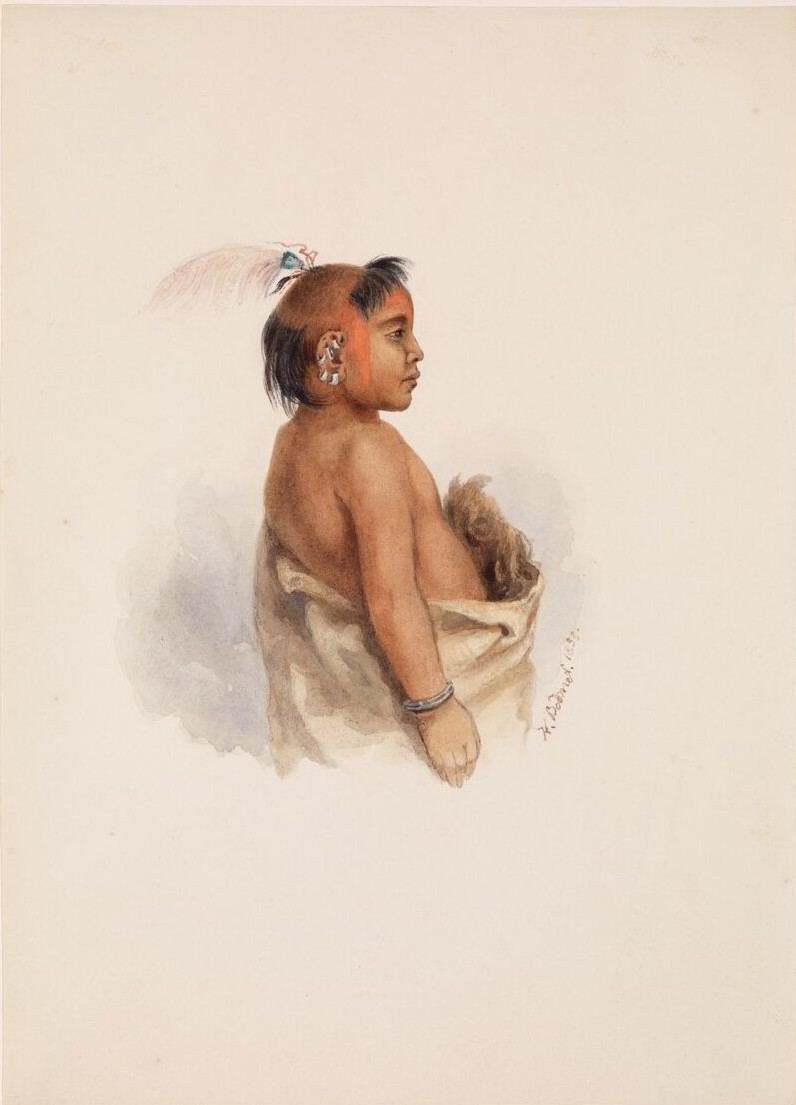
Karl Bodmer, Omaha Boy, 1833

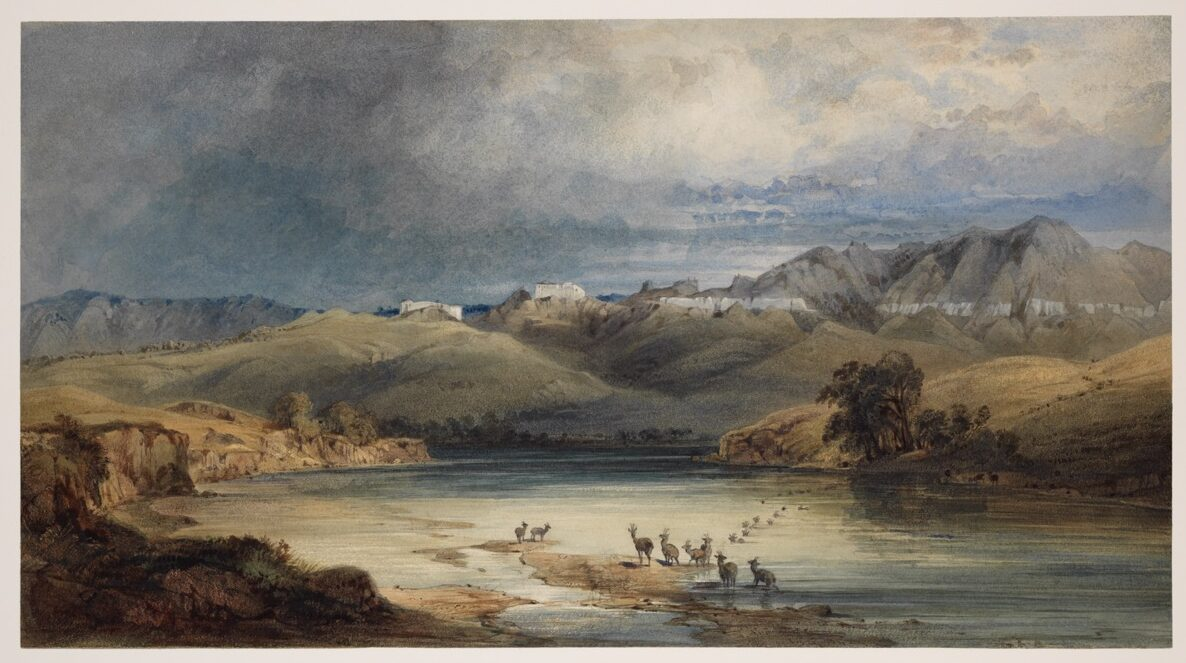
Karl Bodmer, White Castles on the Missouri, 1833

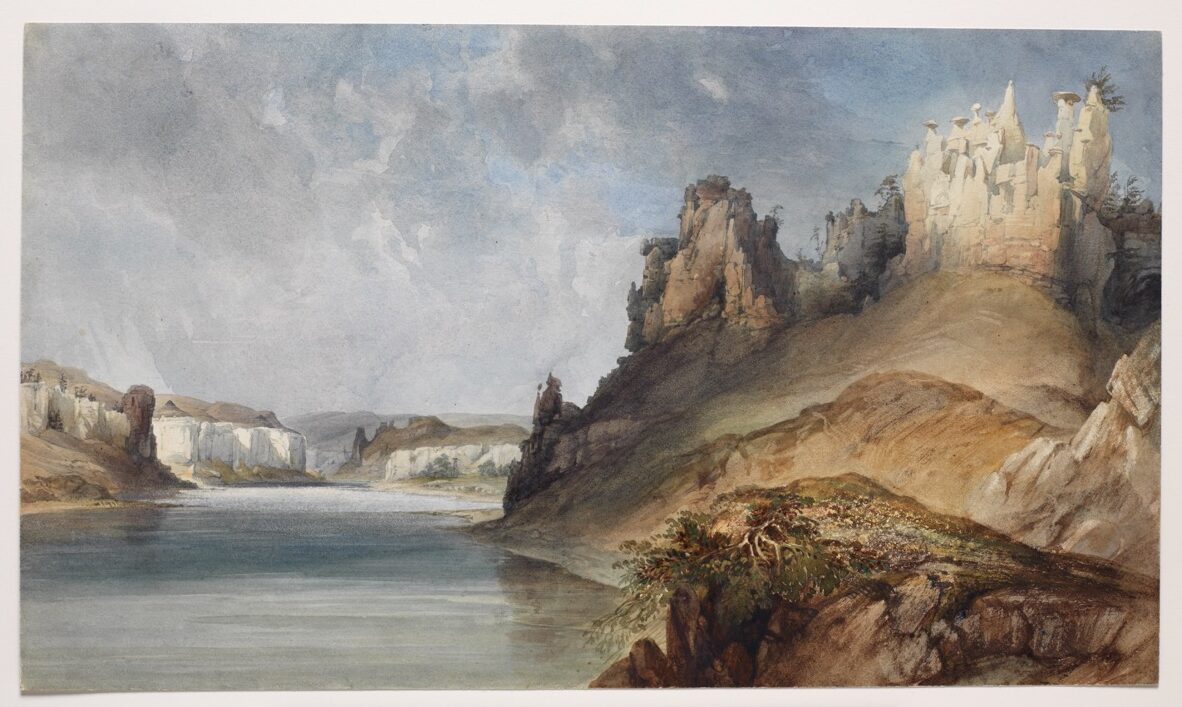
Karl Bodmer, View of the Stone Walls, 1833

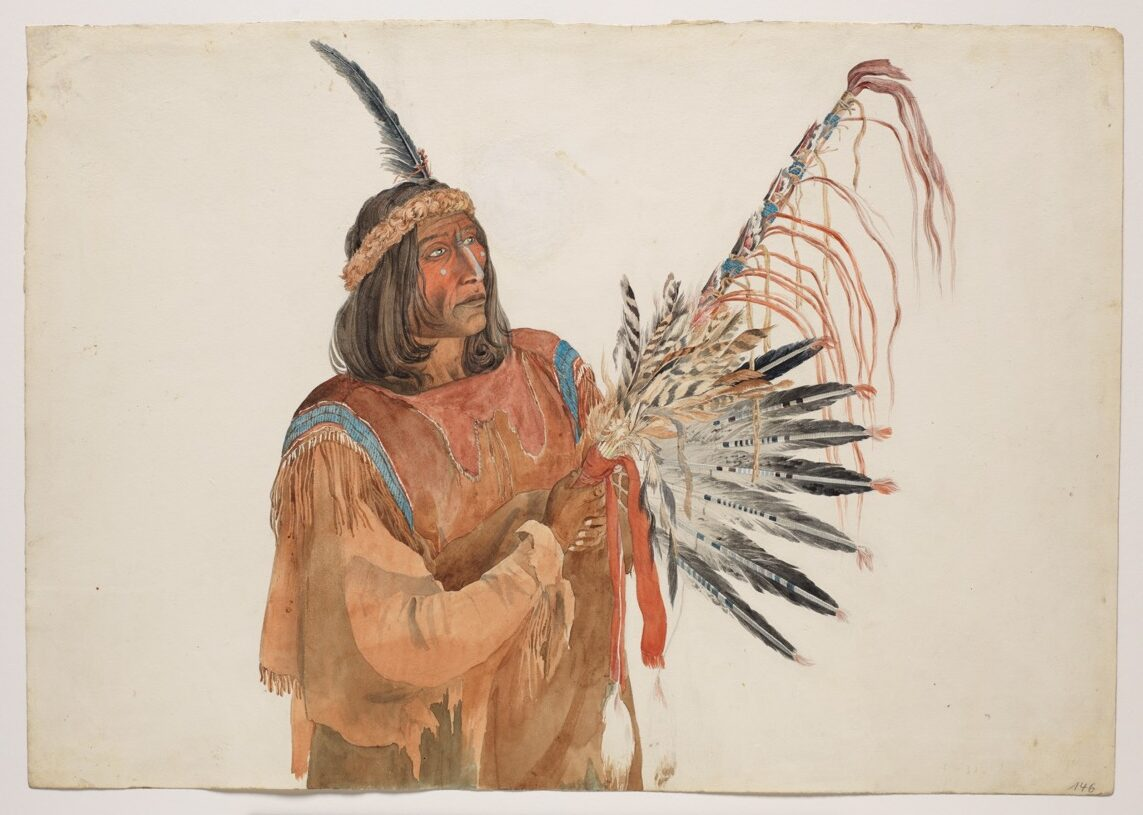
Karl Bodmer, Hotokáneheh, Piegan Blackfeet Man, 1833

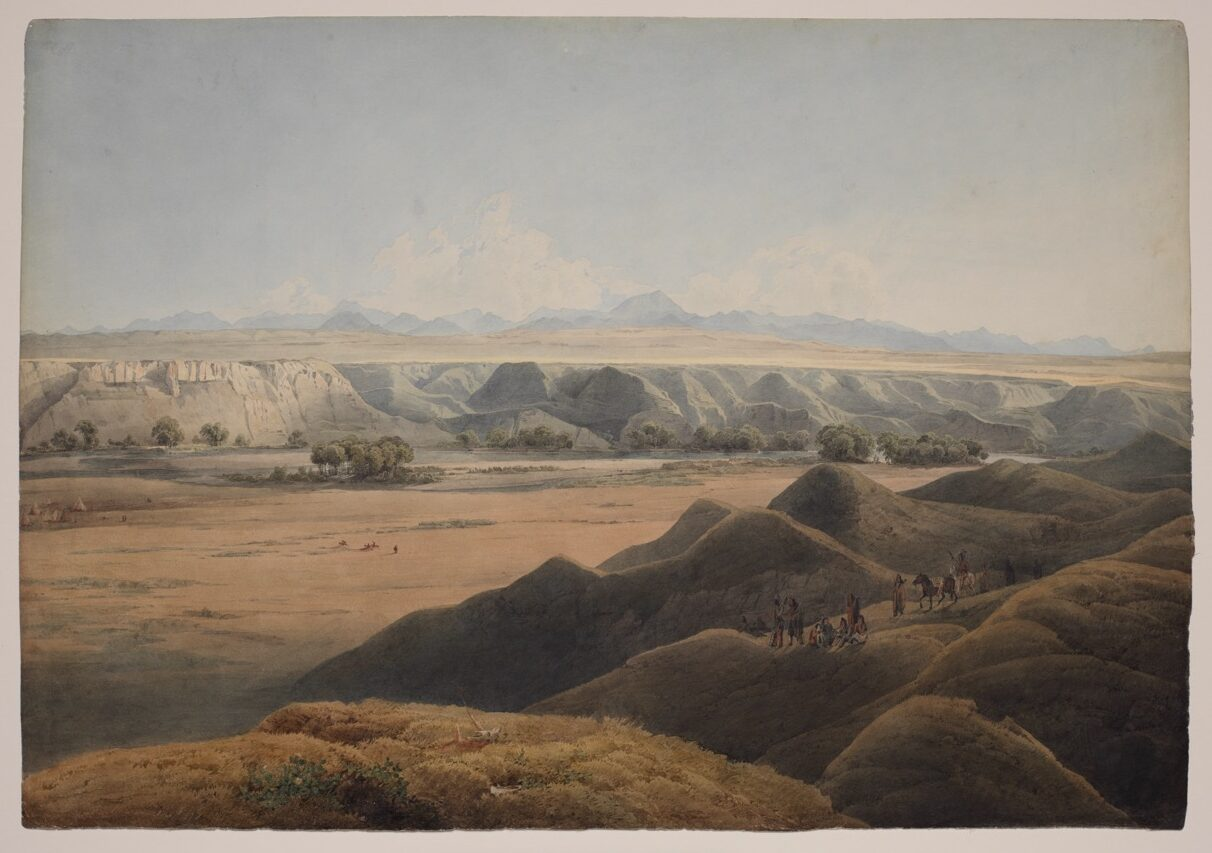
Karl Bodmer, First Chain of the Rocky Mountains above Fort McKenzie, 1833

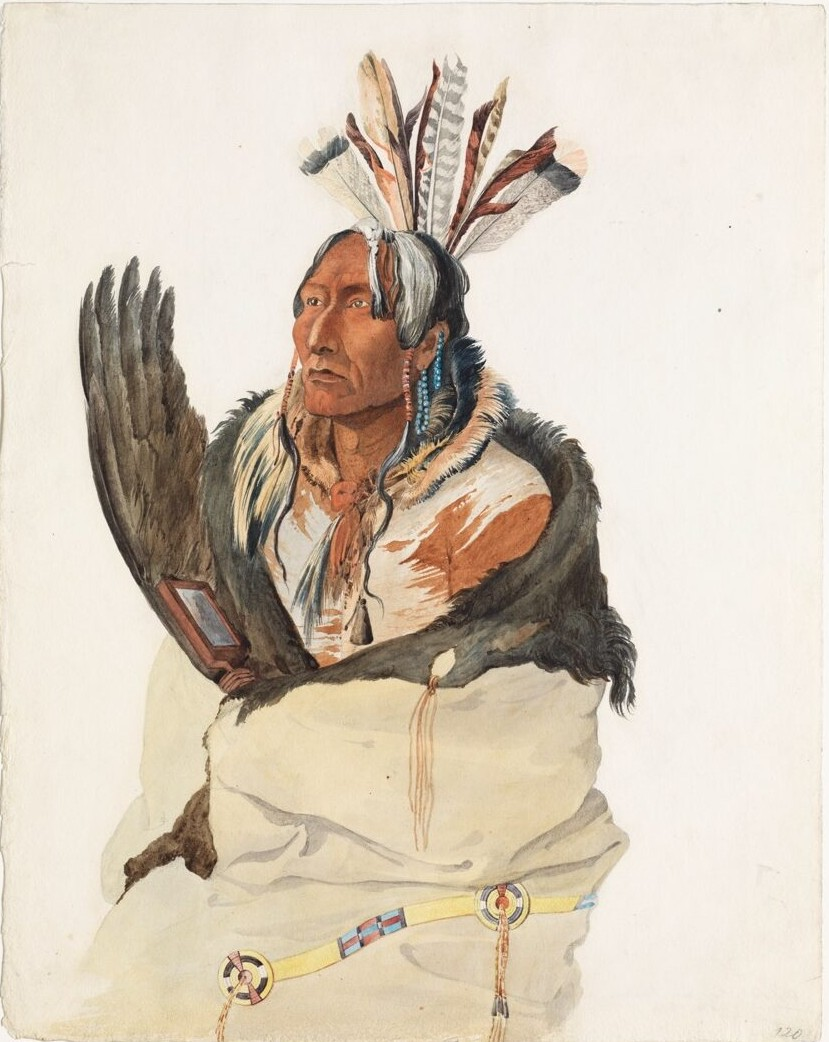
Karl Bodmer, Upsichtä́, Mandan Man, 1834
- Latin American: Prominent works in this collection include paintings of saint figures and pottery from Felix Ortiz.
- Post War and Contemporary: Sculpture by Deborah Butterfield, Robert Haozous, Donald Judd, Sol LeWitt and Martin Puryear; Abstract Expressionist works by Jackson Pollock, Hans Hofmann, and Helen Frankenthaler; and Pop Art works by George Segal, Tom Wesselmann, as well as the Omaha-born painter Ed Ruscha, who donated over 40 of his works to the museum in 2018.
- Asian: Consists mainly of ancient Chinese sculpture from the 2nd and 3rd centuries, as well as Japanese decorative arts of the 19th and 20th centuries.

=== Sculpture gardens ===
Joslyn's sculpture gardens include:

Peter Kiewit Foundation Sculpture Garden:

- Oedipus at Colonnus (1968) by Leonard Baskin
- Untitled (2005) by Jun Kaneko
- Bronze Bench #5 (2005) by Betty Woodman
- Dineh (1981) by Allen Houser
- Spirit of the Dance (1932) by William Zorach
- Large Covered Wagon (2004) by Tom Otterness
- One of the Burghers of Calais (1987) by Auguste Rodin
- Double-Sided Settee (A Trio) (1983) by Scott Burton
- Addih-Hiddisch, Hidatsa Chief (2008) by John Coleman
- Sioux Warrior (2008) by John David Brcin
- The Omaha Riverscape (2008-2009) by Jesús Moroles

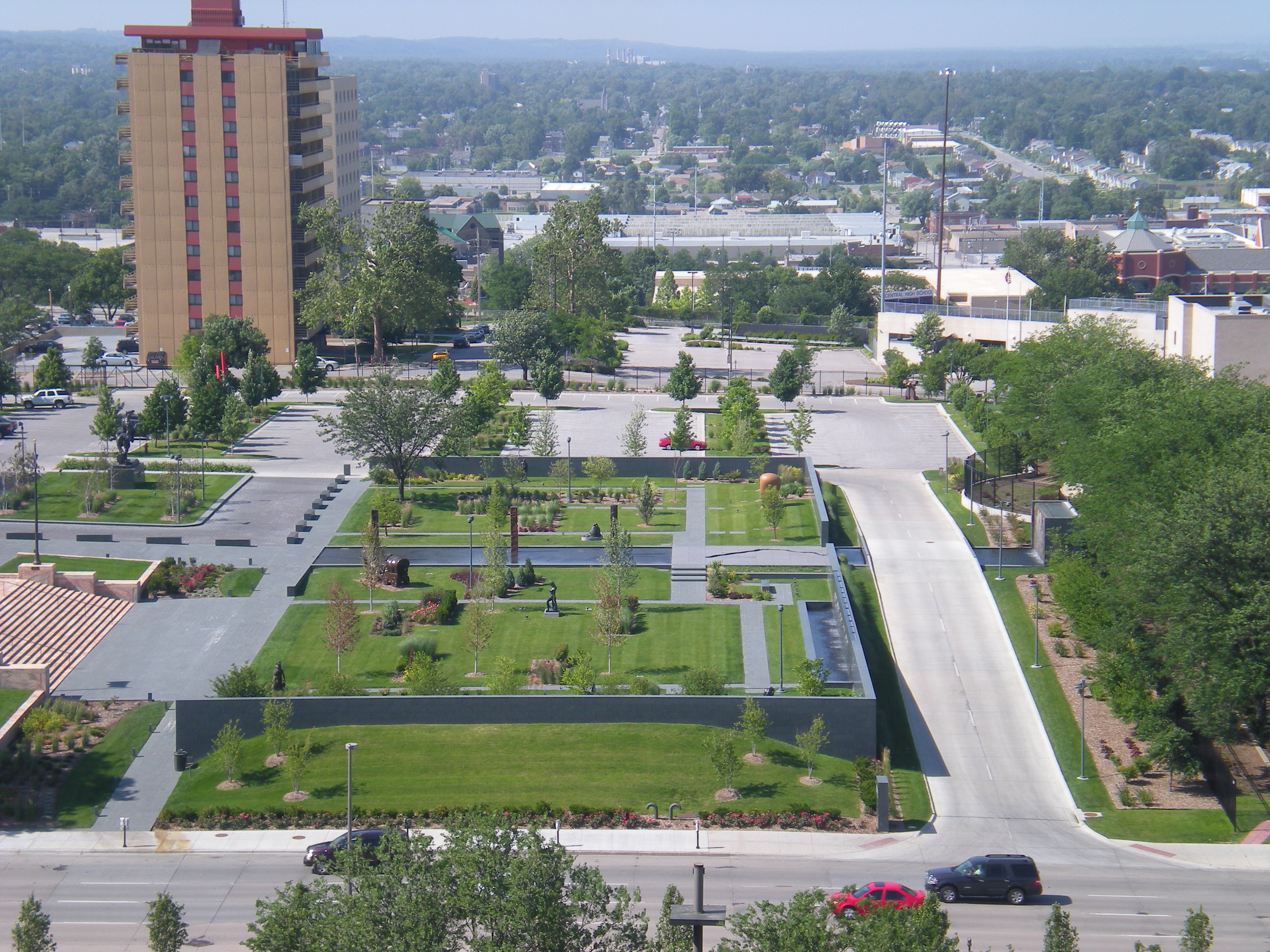
After the garden was completed, 2010.

Discover Garden:

- Noodles & Doodles by Smith Bourne and Associates Inc.
- Folded Square Alphabet O (1987) by Fletcher Benton
- Metamorphosis by Benard Matemera
- Yellow Ascending (1977) by George Sugarman
- Pencil Bench (2009) by Ron Parks
- 22 1/2 Degrees with Crayon Tips (2009) by Ron Parks
- Cubular (2009) by Peter McClenon Carter

Other outdoor sculpture:

- Able Charlie (1983) by Kenneth Snelson
- Untitled (1981) by John Henry
- Pawn (1980) by Sidney Buchanan
- Generations (2007) by Josiah Manzi

== See also ==
- Joslyn Castle, the private residence built in 1903 for George and Sarah Joslyn, added to the National Register of Historic Places in 1972.
