= Joslyn Castle =

Historic house in Nebraska, United States

- U.S. National Register of Historic Places
- Omaha Landmark
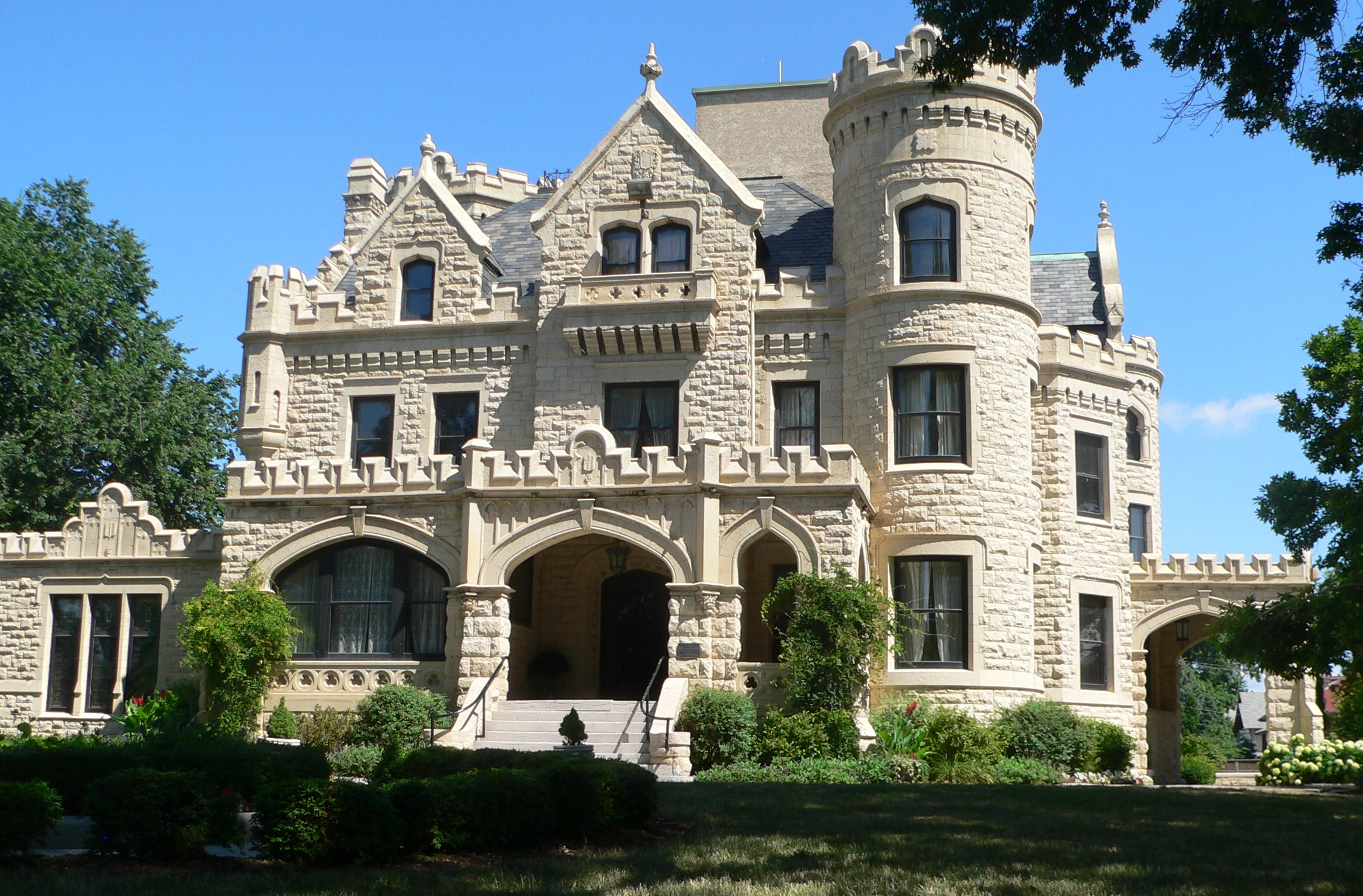
- View from the south

- Location within Nebraska Location within the United States
- Location: Omaha, Nebraska
- Coordinates: 41°15′42.1″N 95°58′18.5″W
- Built: 1903
- Architectural style: Scottish Baronial
- NRHP reference No.: 72000747

Significant dates
- Added to NRHP: 1972
- Designated OMAL: May 22, 1979

The George and Sarah Joslyn Home (officially named "Lynhurst," and known locally as Joslyn Castle), is a mansion located at 3902 Davenport Street in the Gold Coast Historic District of Omaha, Nebraska, United States. Built in the Scottish Baronial style in 1903, the Castle was added to the National Register of Historic Places in 1972. It was designated as an Omaha landmark in 1979.

== History ==
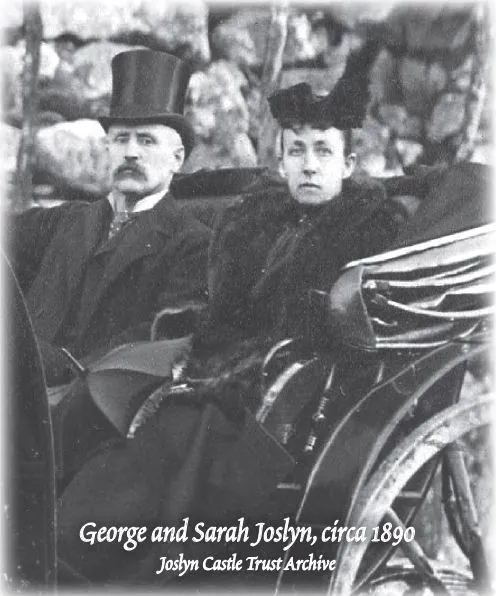
George and Sarah Joslyn c. 1890

George Joslyn made his fortune in the ready-print news business and owned the Western Newspaper Union. The Joslyns contributed to many Omaha-area organizations, including Sarah Joslyn's donation which made Omaha's Joslyn Art Museum possible.

Joslyn Castle was designed by John McDonald, a local architect. Shortly after George Joslyn bought a farm outside of Omaha in 1893, he began landscaping it. Landscape architect Jens Jensen designed the grounds, as well as the rock work and pools for the conservatory inside the house.

== Design ==
The 35-room mansion has four stories, as well as a carriage house tower, built before the Castle in 1901, and 5 acres (20,000 m^{2}) of formal gardens and landscaping, including greenhouses, which were completed in 1899. Mature trees were planted on the 5.5-acre (22,000 m^{2}) grounds, and Sarah collected rare botanicals from around the world, including orchids. According to The Friends of Joslyn Castle, the home was built in eleven months at a cost of $250,000.

The Castle includes a reception hall, music room, ballroom, a library and gold drawing room. The basement at one time had a bowling alley.

The Castle and the carriage house were built of Kansas silverdale limestone. There is a wrought iron door on the Castle that weighs over a ton.

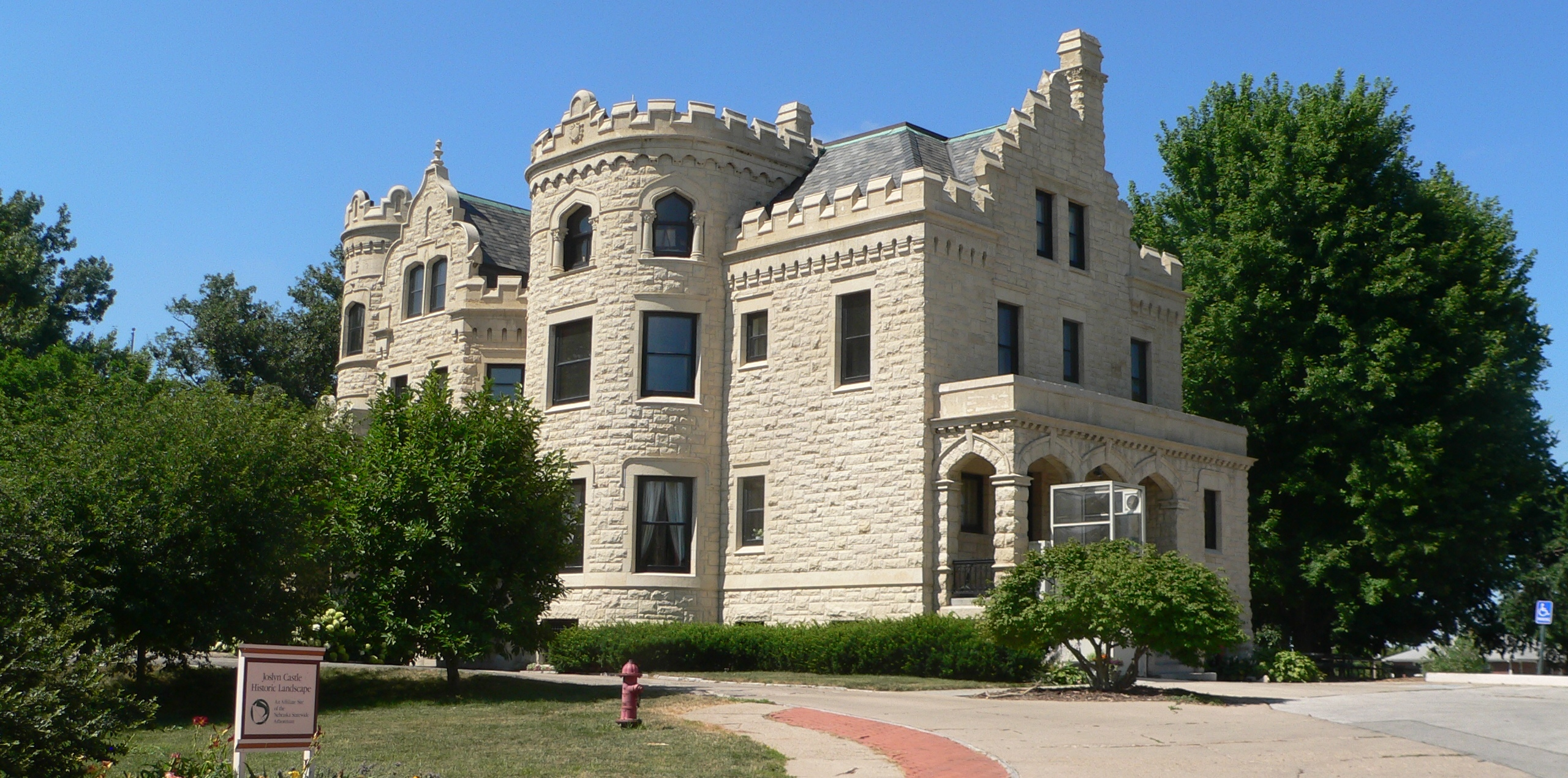
View from the northeast

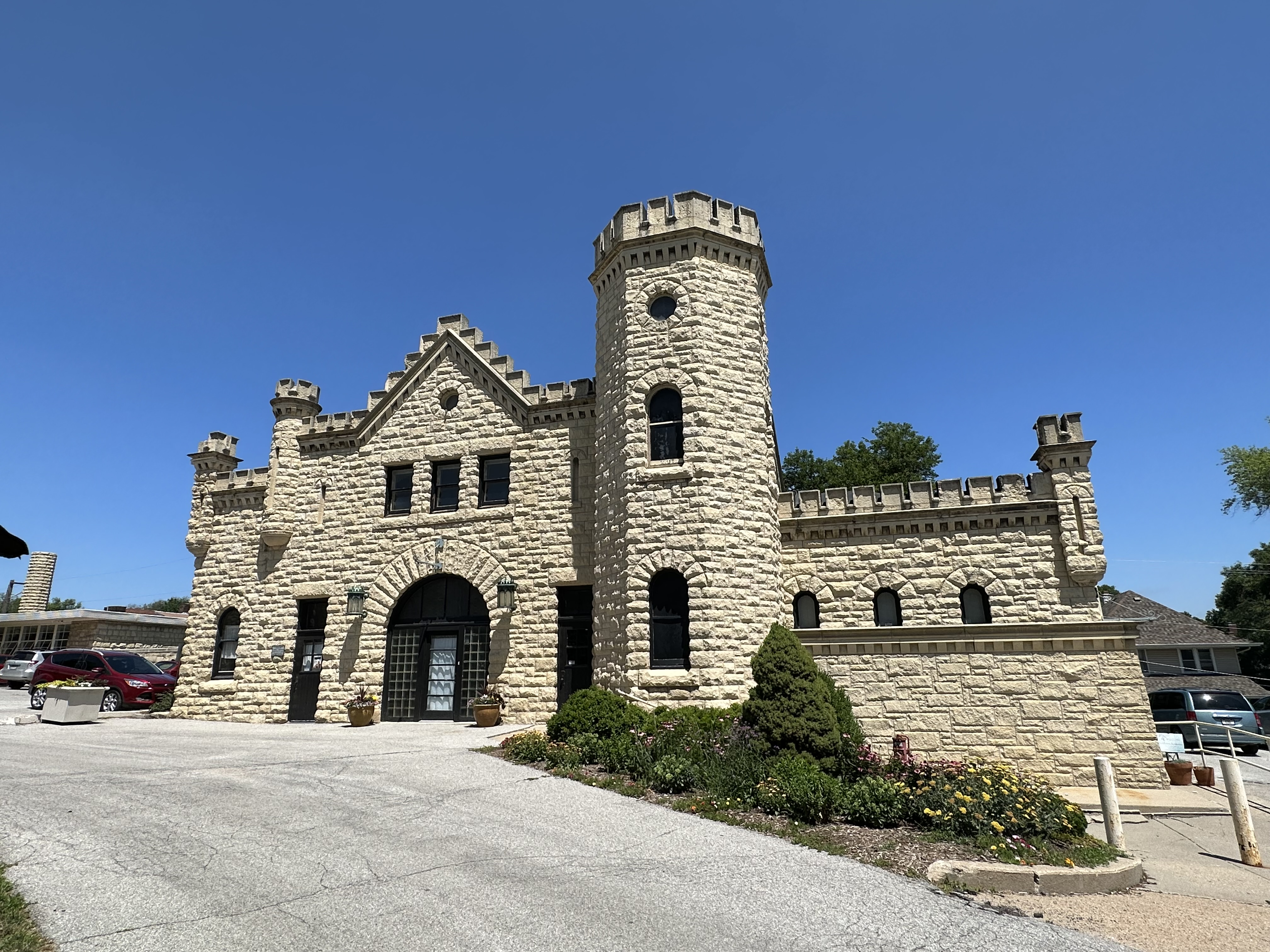
Joslyn Castle, the carriage house, July 2023

== 1913 tornado ==
On March 23, 1913, a tornado demolished much of the central and north parts of Omaha. The home was slightly damaged. Inside, some furniture, artwork, etchings, and statuary were ruined. George stated that it would take fifteen years to restore the estate grounds to their previous state. The greenhouses were partially destroyed. The Joslyns decided not to rebuild the greenhouse, so they donated the frame to Hanscom Park, where it was used as a greenhouse for fifty years. In the conservatory, many of Sarah Joslyn's orchids and other tropical plants were killed by the cold and snow which followed the tornado. The storm also destroyed a small lake and bridge to the west of the Castle. Today the bridge remains, and an outline of the small lake is visible. The home was repaired and that fall, the Castle hosted a gala event for the wedding of their daughter, Violet.

== Recent history ==
In 1944, the Castle became the headquarters of the Omaha Public Schools district. In 1958, the district incorporated some of the walls of the original greenhouses into an office annex.

In 1989, the school system moved to a larger facility in the former Tech High School building. The Castle then became the property of the State of Nebraska. In 1996, the Joslyn Castle became home of the Joslyn Castle Institute for Sustainable Communities. The Institute was charged by the State of Nebraska with managing and preserving the estate. In December 2010, Joslyn Castle was sold by the State of Nebraska to the Joslyn Castle Trust, a private concern created for the purpose of maintaining the historic property.

Today, the Castle is the namesake of the surrounding Joslyn Castle neighborhood, and is a site in the Nebraska Statewide Arboretum.

The Castle and its grounds are open to the public for tours, events, and private rental.

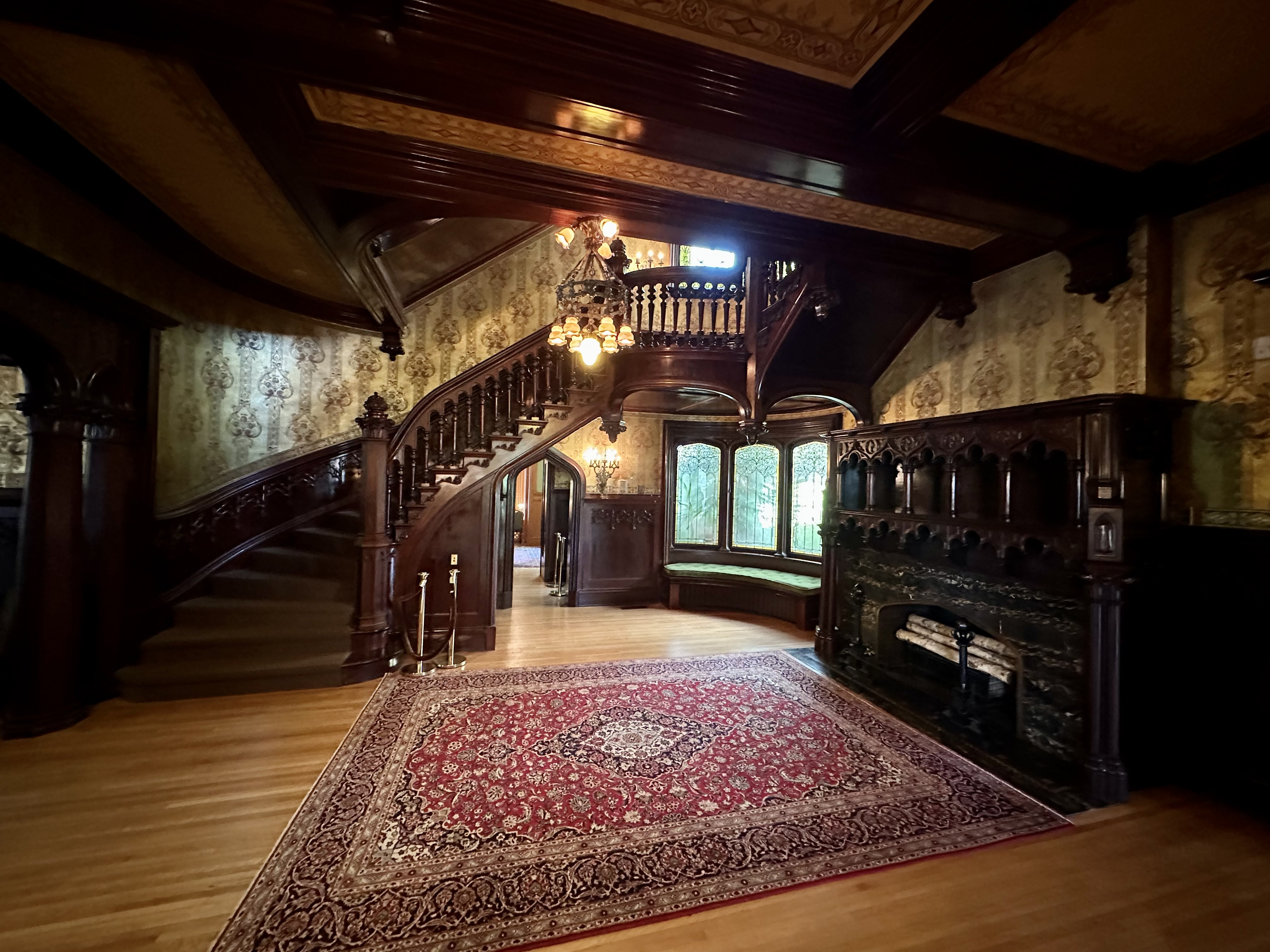
Joslyn Castle, the reception hall and staircase
