= List of landmarks on U.S. Route 66 =

The landmarks on U.S. Route 66 include roadside attractions, notable establishments, and buildings of historical significance along U.S. Route 66 (US 66, Route 66).

Route 66 was designated in 1926. Traffic increased after World War II, and businesses serving motorists expanded along the highway. Interstate highways replaced US 66 in stages over the next three decades. The last section was bypassed in 1984, and the route was decommissioned in 1985. Public agencies and private organizations then began campaigns to preserve and commemorate the road and its remaining roadside properties.

== Illinois ==
- Lou Mitchell's (Chicago) – A restaurant listed on the National Register of Historic Places, and nicknamed "the first stop on the Mother Road".
- Gemini Giant (Wilmington) – A 30-ft tall Muffler Man fiberglass statue of a spaceman with a rocket.
- Cozy Dog Drive In (Springfield) – A hot dog restaurant with Route 66 memorabilia and a gift shop.
- Maid-Rite Sandwich Shop (Springfield) – Maid-Rite franchise built in 1921 and housed in a listed building.
- Shea's Gas Station Museum (Springfield) – Former gas station and museum. Closed in 2015.
- Dixie Travel Plaza (McLean) – Large trucker and travel plaza.
- Chain of Rocks Bridge (Madison–St. Louis) – A former Route 66 crossing of the Mississippi River with a 30-degree bend near midspan. Route 66 was rerouted over the bridge in 1936. It closed to motor vehicles in 1968 and reopened for pedestrians and cyclists in 1999.
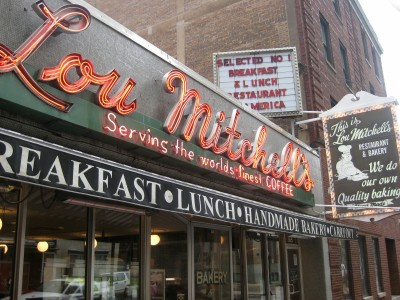
Lou Mitchell's Restaurant

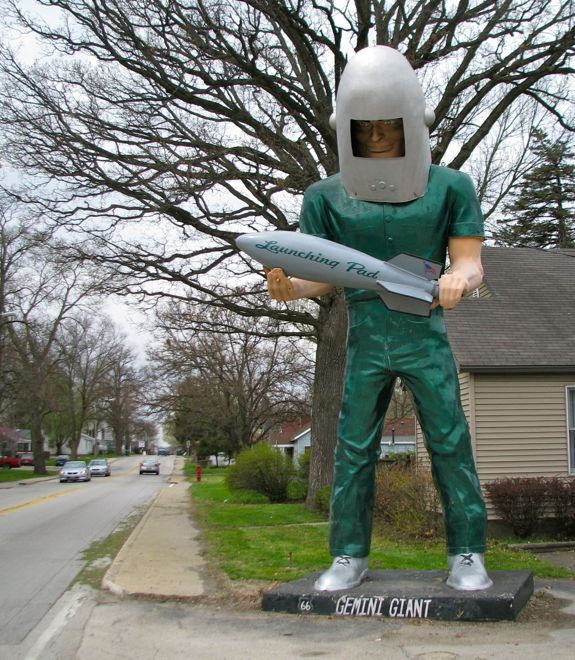
Gemini Giant

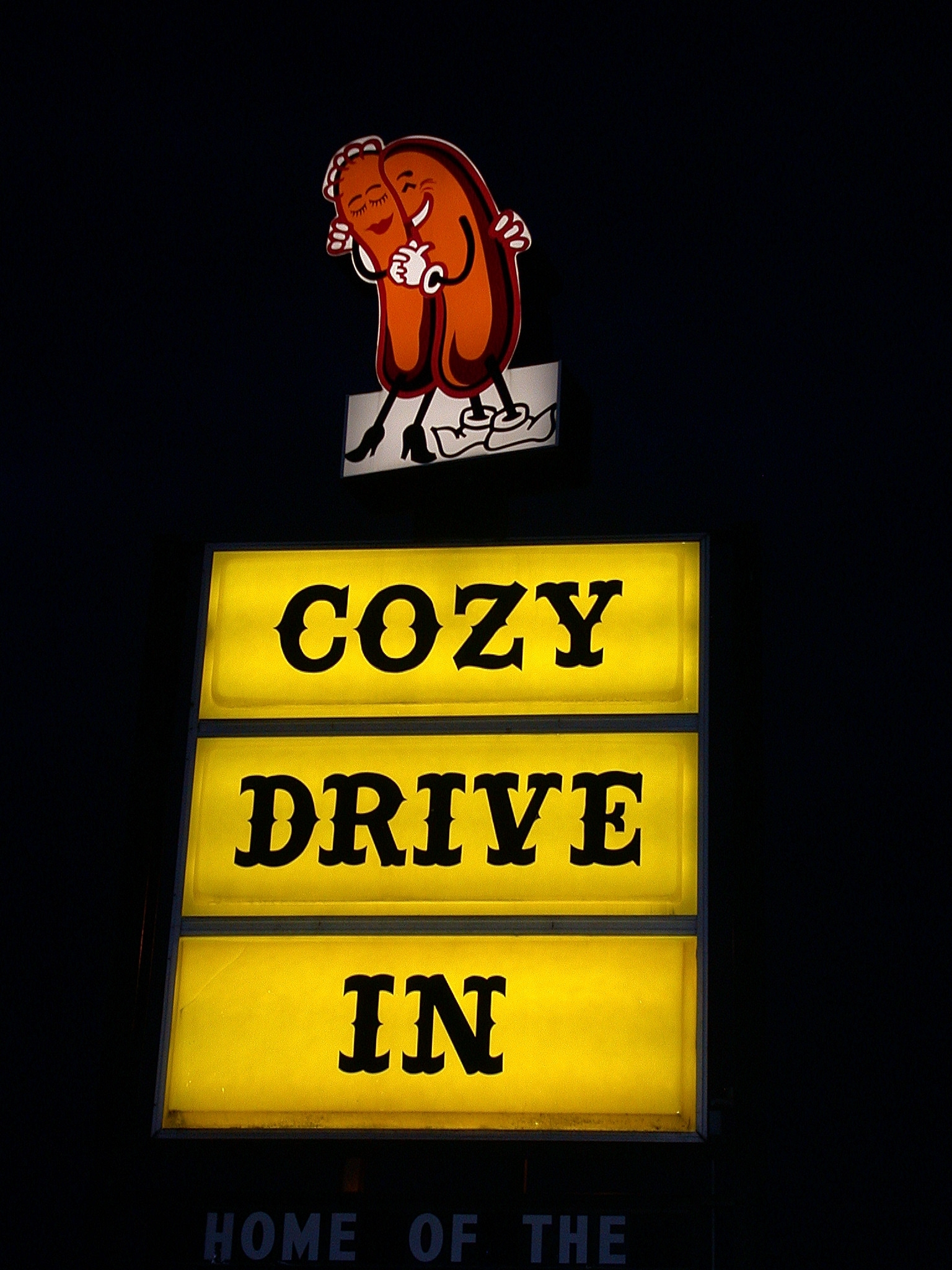
Sign at the Cozy Dog Drive In

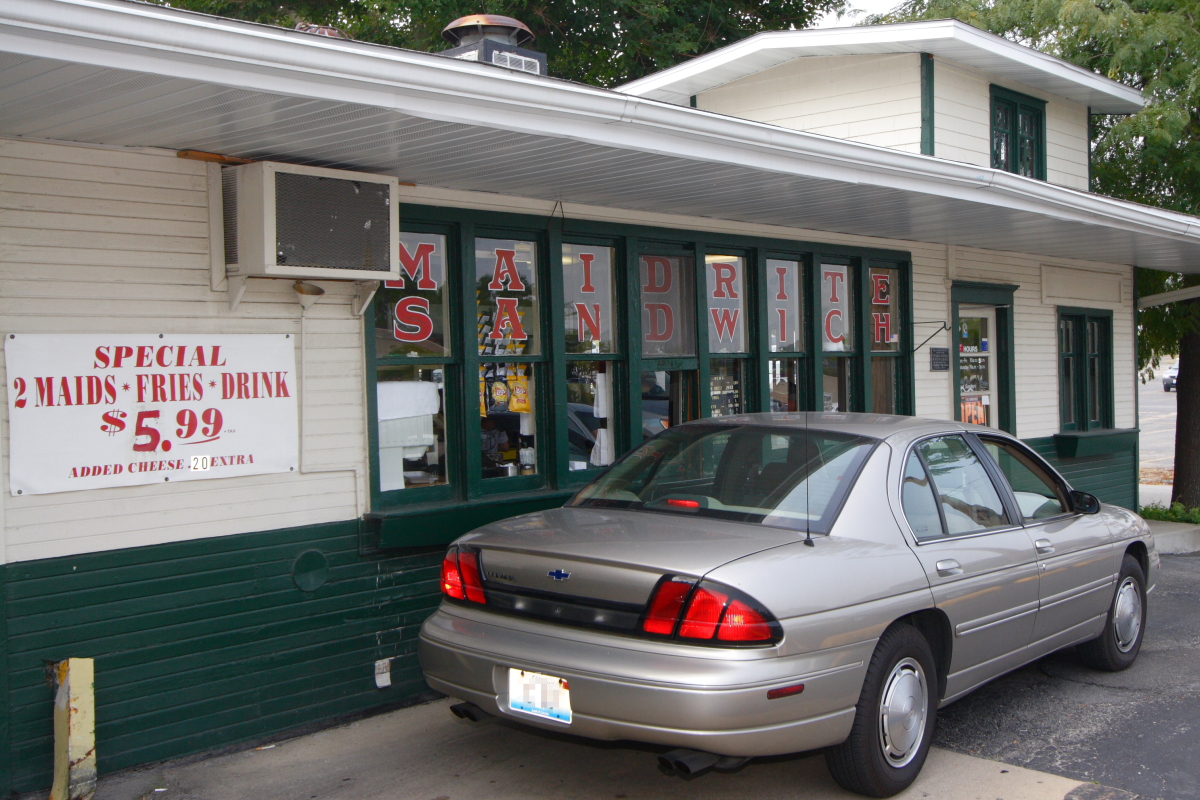
Maid-Rite Sandwich Shop

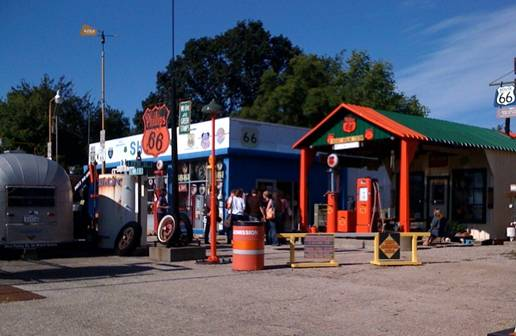
Shea's Gas Station Museum

== Missouri ==
- World's second largest rocking chair, Fanning – Large statue of a rocking chair.
- Red's Giant Hamburg (Springfield) – The world's first drive-through restaurant.
- 66 Drive-In (Carthage) – Historic drive-in theater.
- Ted Drewes (St. Louis) – A frozen custard company.
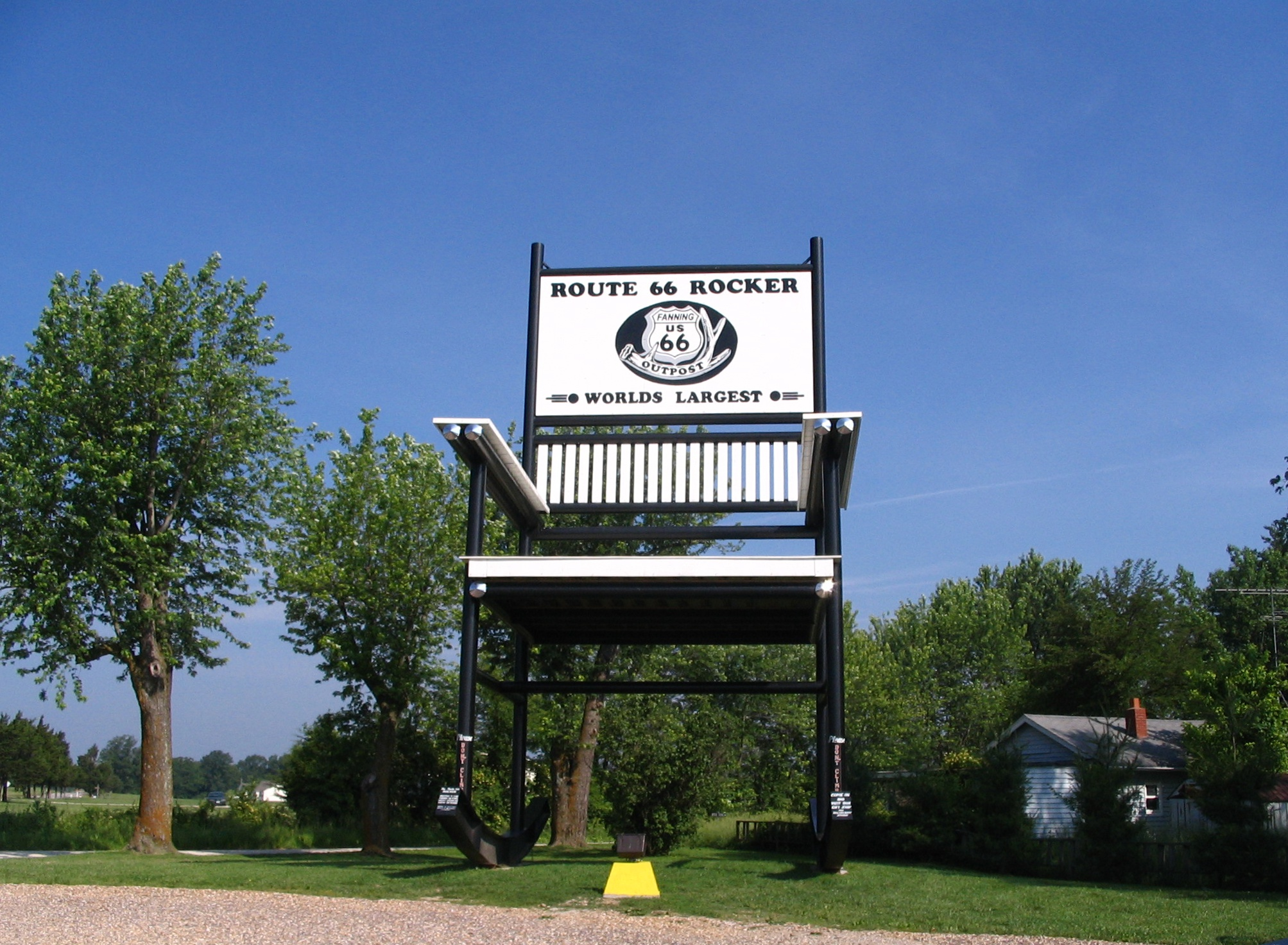
World's second largest rocking chair

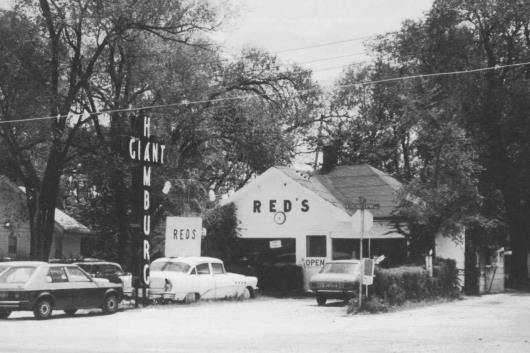
Red's Giant Hamburg

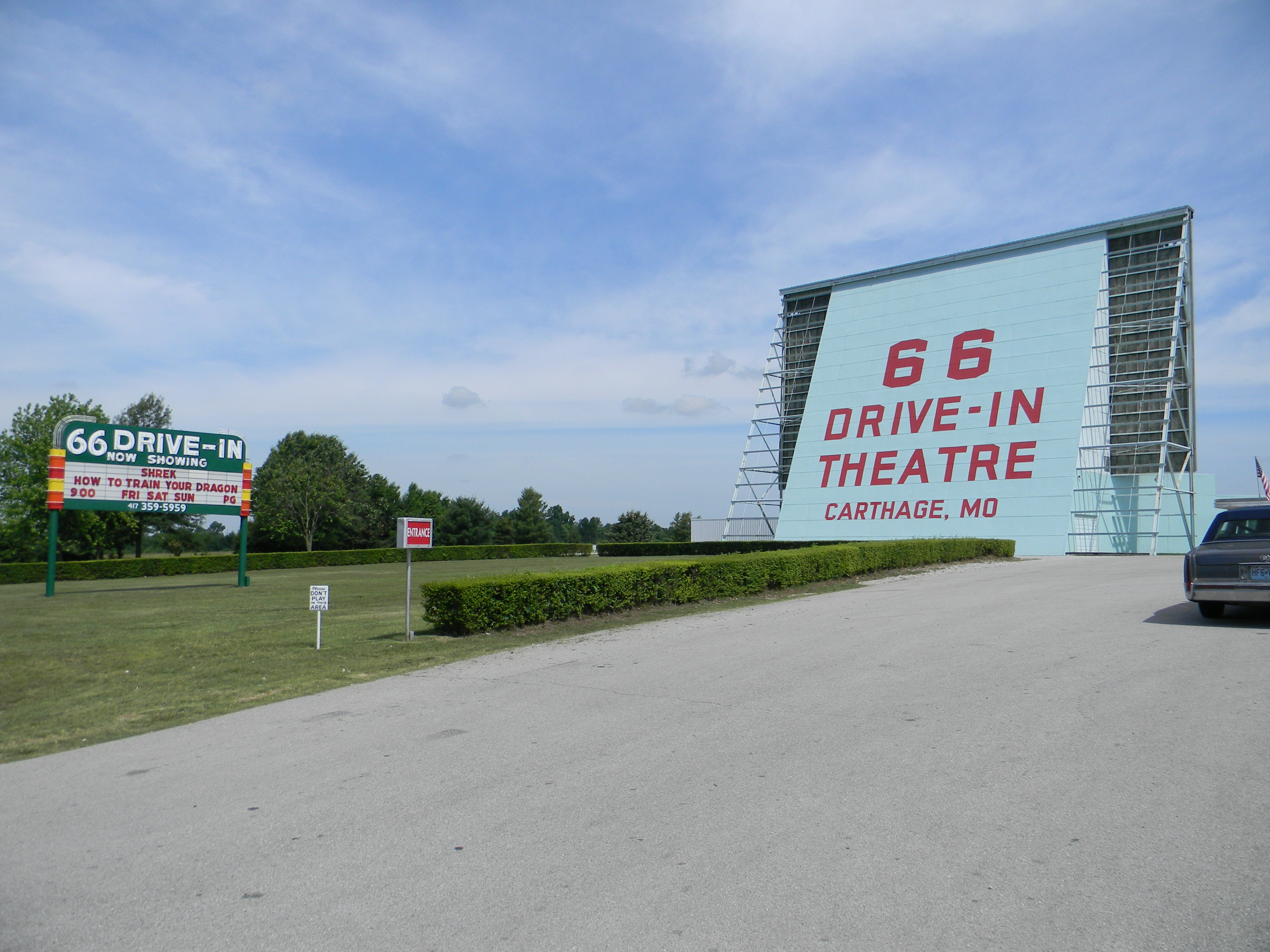
66 Drive-In

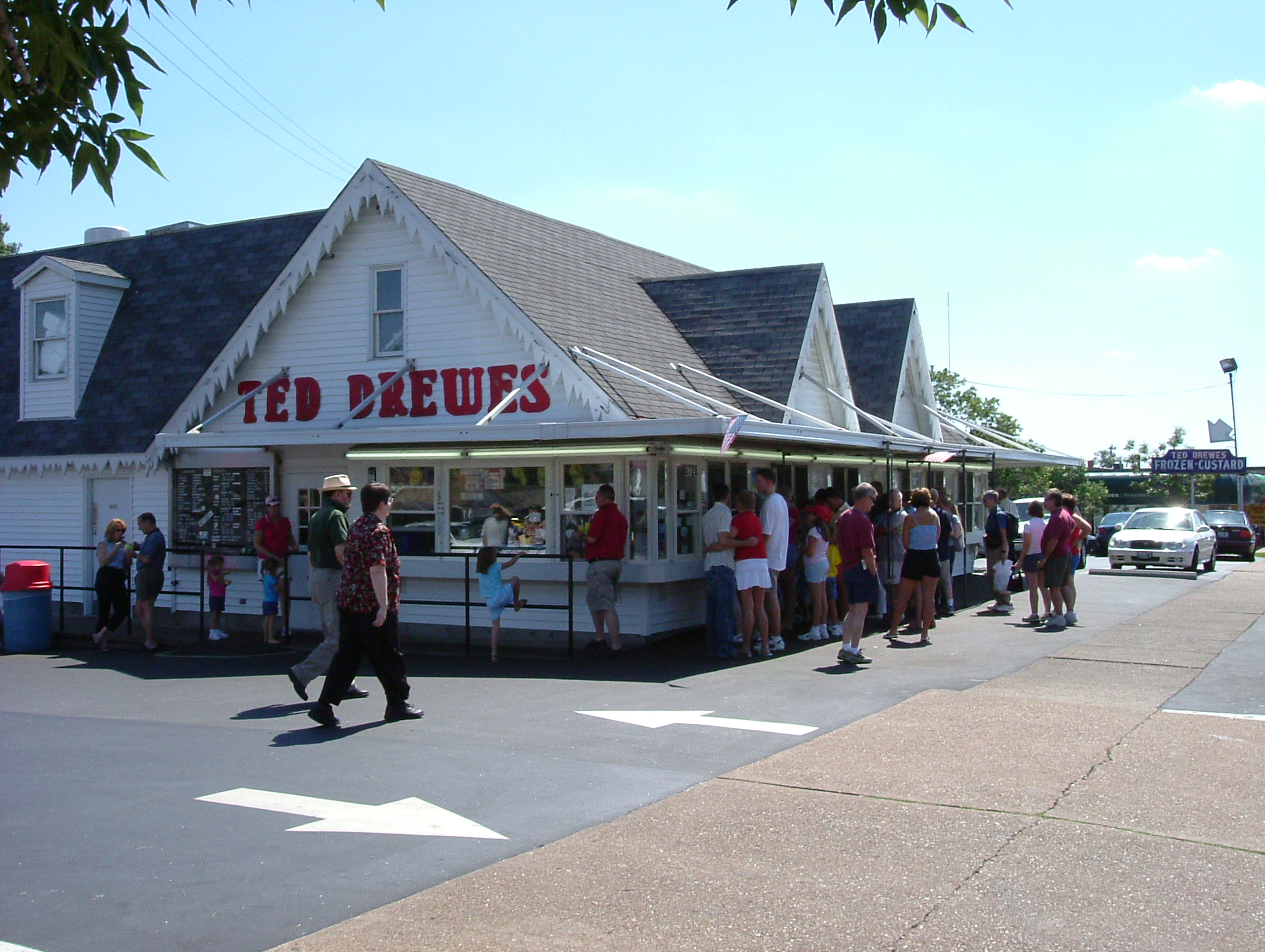
Ted Drewes

== Kansas ==
- Baxter Springs Independent Oil and Gas Service Station (Baxter Springs) – Historic gas station.
- Rainbow Bridge (Riverton) – Historic bridge.
- Williams' Store (Riverton) – Historic store.
- Kan-O-Tex Service Station (Galena) – Former service station and souvenir shop.
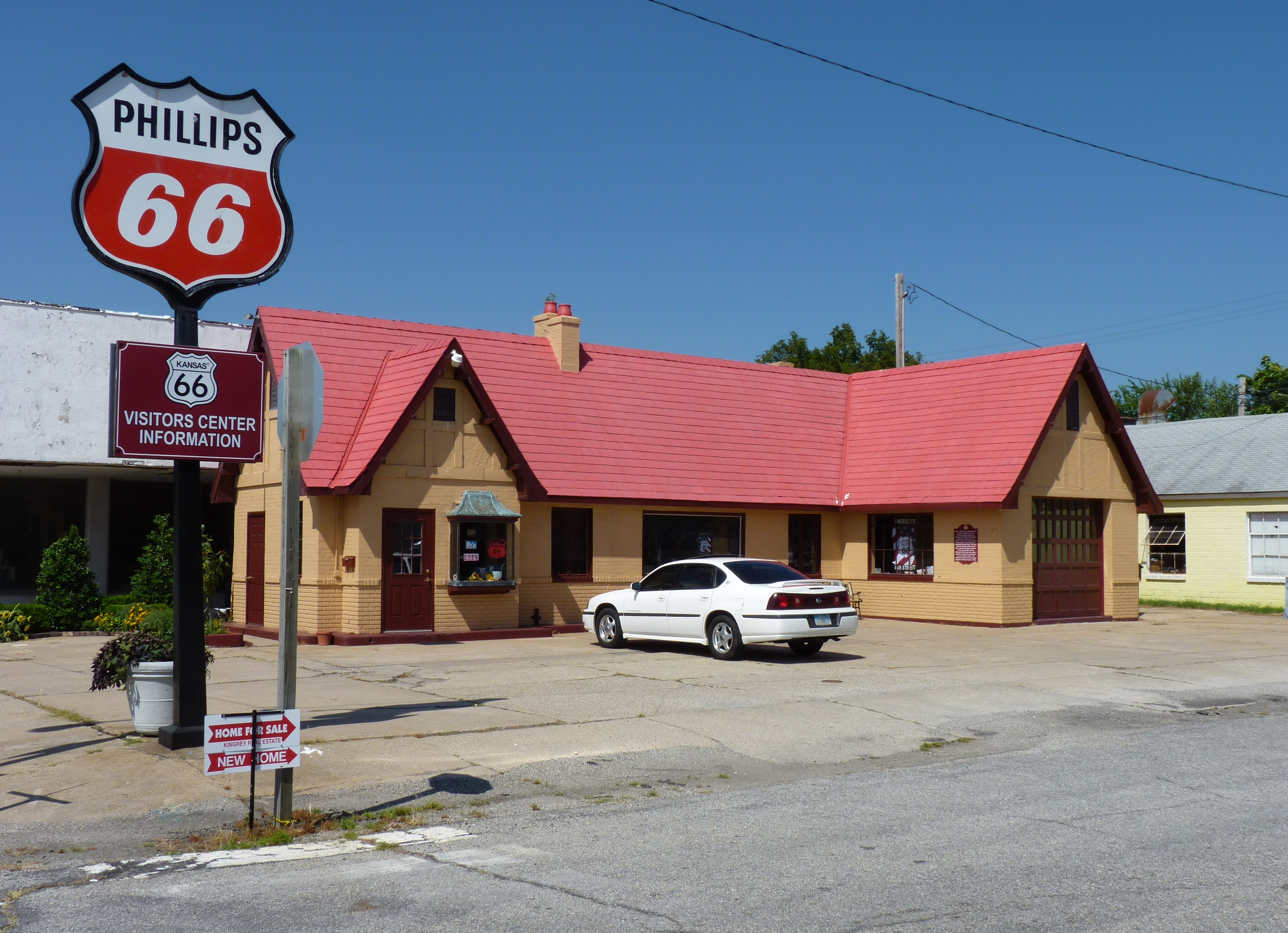
Baxter Springs Independent Oil and Gas Service Station

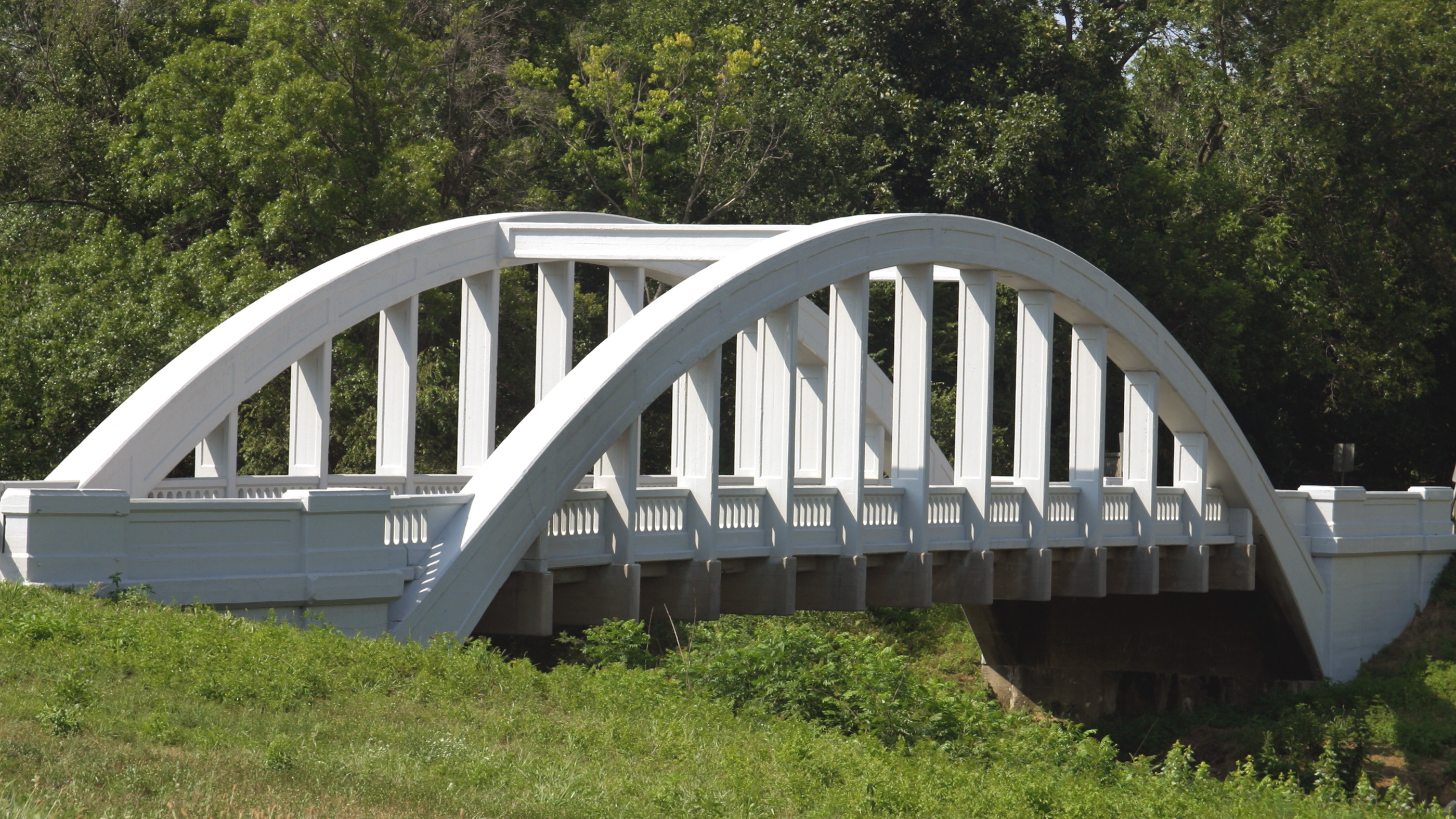
Rainbow Curve Bridge

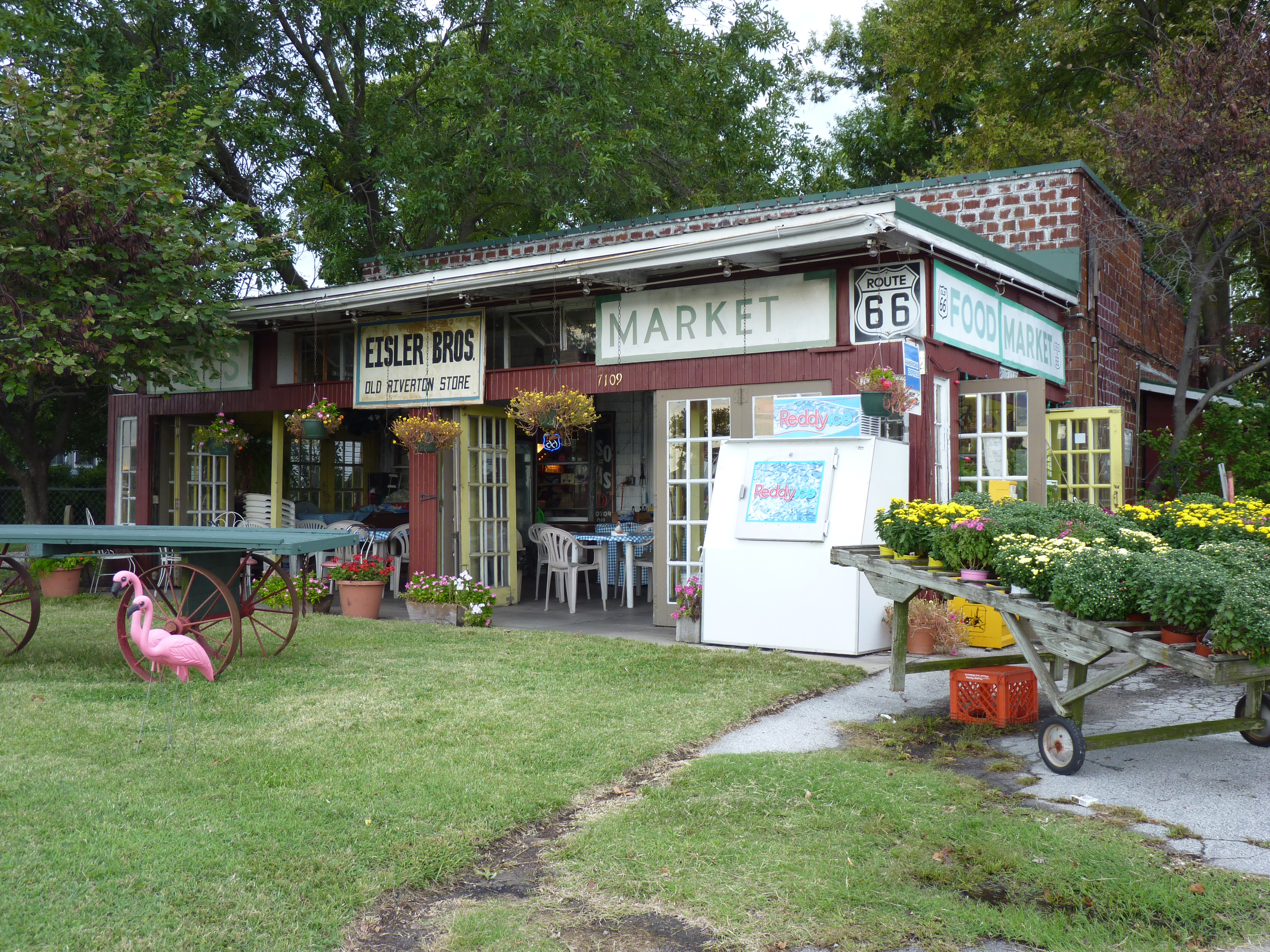
Williams' Store

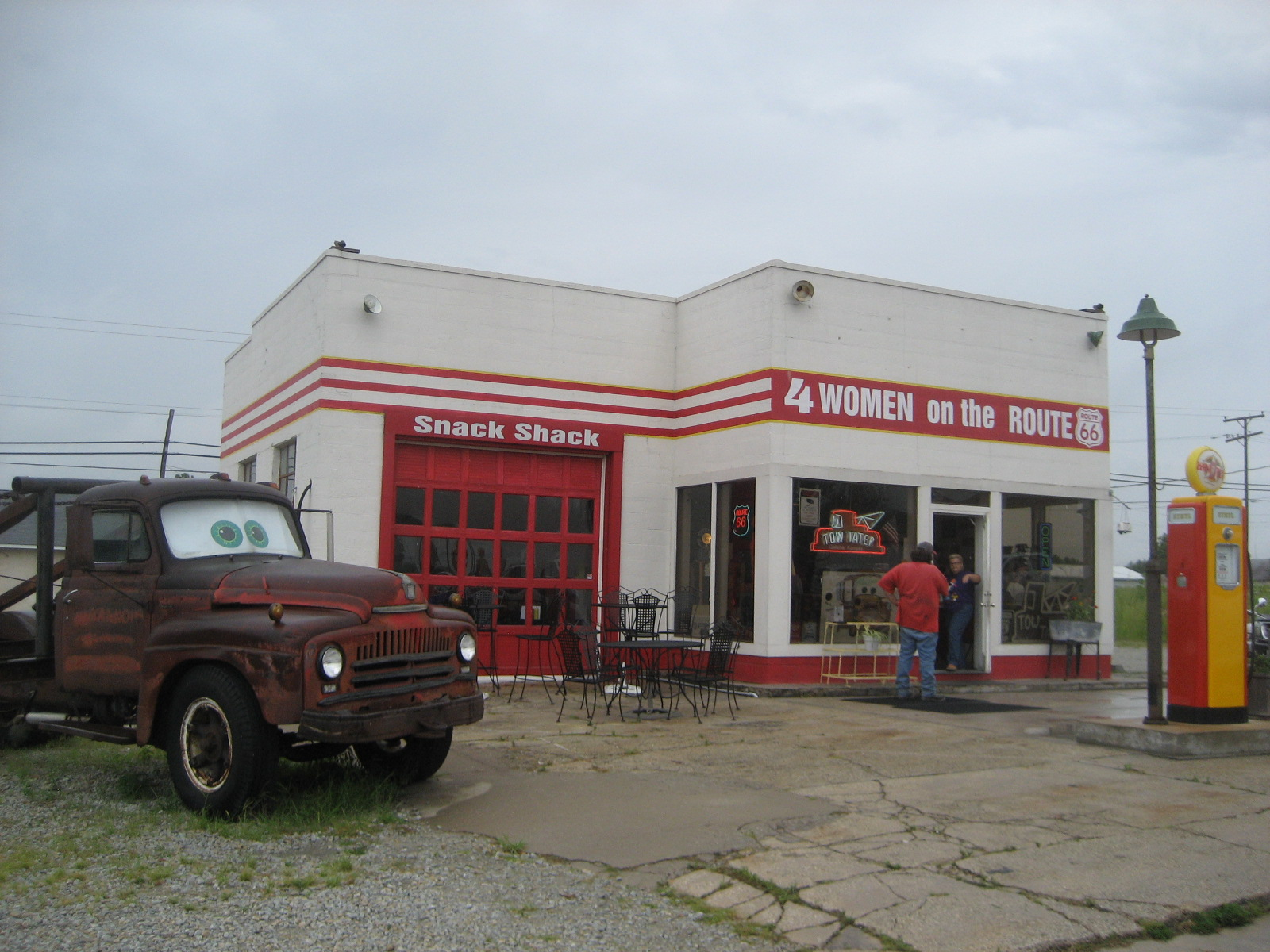
Kan-O-Tex Service Station

== Oklahoma ==
- Blue Whale of Catoosa (Catoosa) – A waterfront structure in the shape of a blue whale.
- Ed Galloway's Totem Pole Park (Foyil) – Folk art park with large concrete totem poles
- Foyil Filling Station (Foyil) – Historic filling station.
- Meadow Gold sign (Tulsa) – Large neon dairy advertisement
- The Blue Dome (Tulsa) – Historic 1924 Gulf Oil service station
- Rock Café (Stroud) – Restored historic restaurant. Owner Dawn Welch inspired the character of Sally Carrera in the movie Cars.
- Pops 66 (Arcadia) – A soda pop themed restaurant with a neon sign in the shape of a soda pop bottle.
- Arcadia Round Barn (Arcadia) – A round barn built in 1898.
- Milk Bottle Grocery (Oklahoma City) – Historic grocery store with a large metal Braum's milk bottle atop its roof.
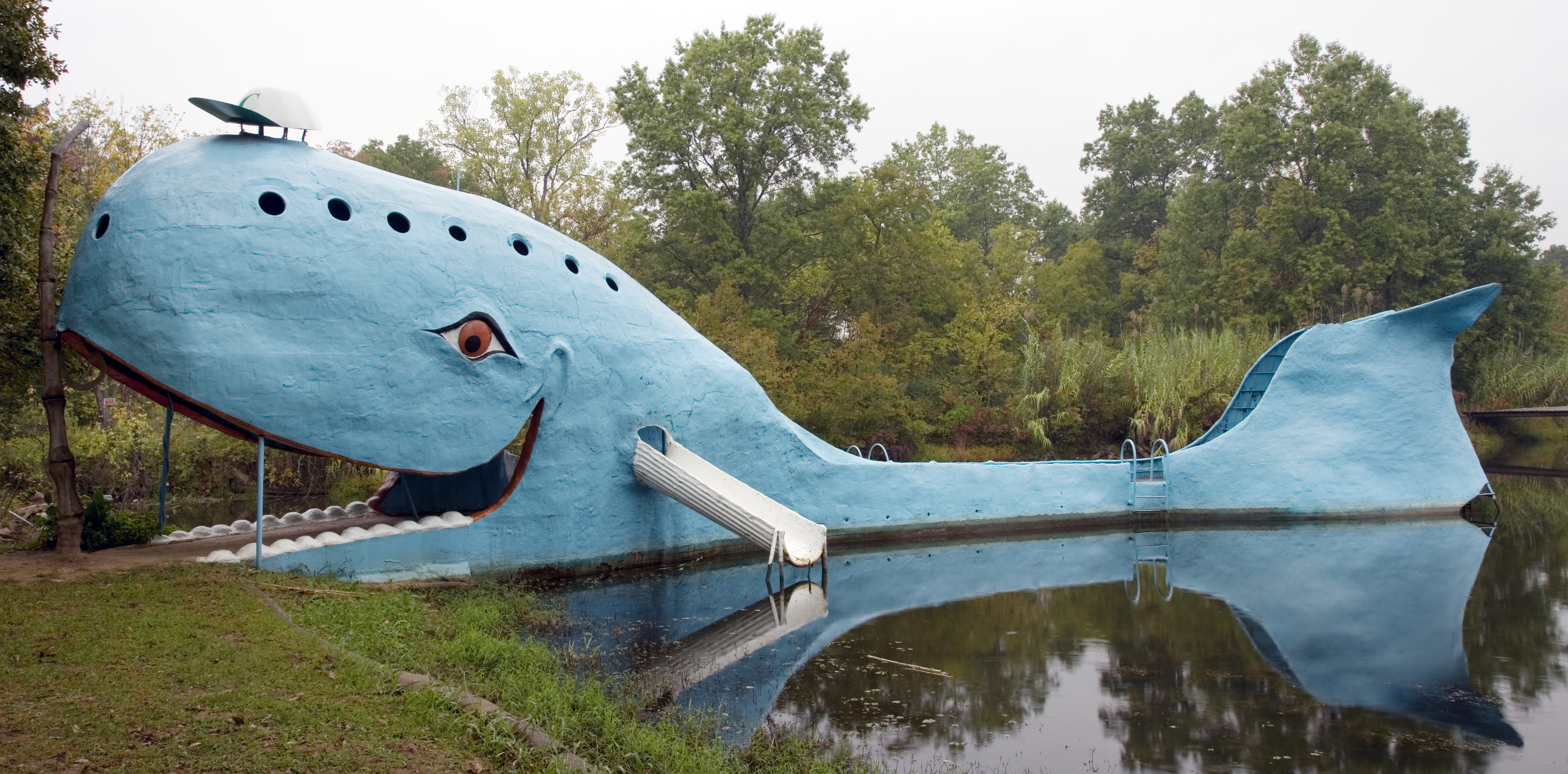
Blue Whale of Catoosa

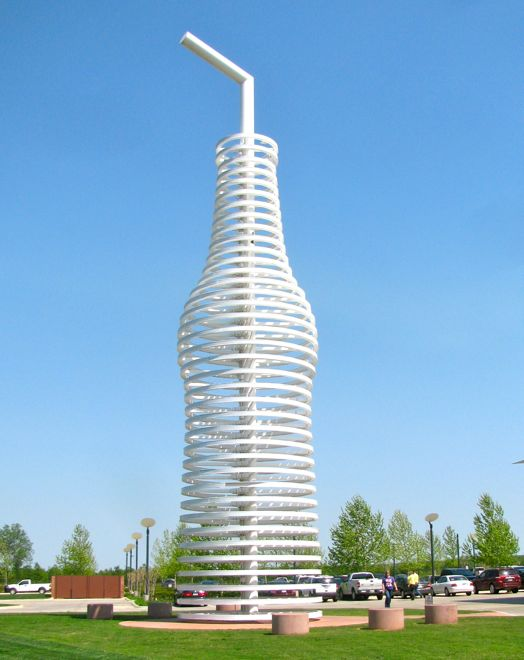
Pops 66 Giant Bottle

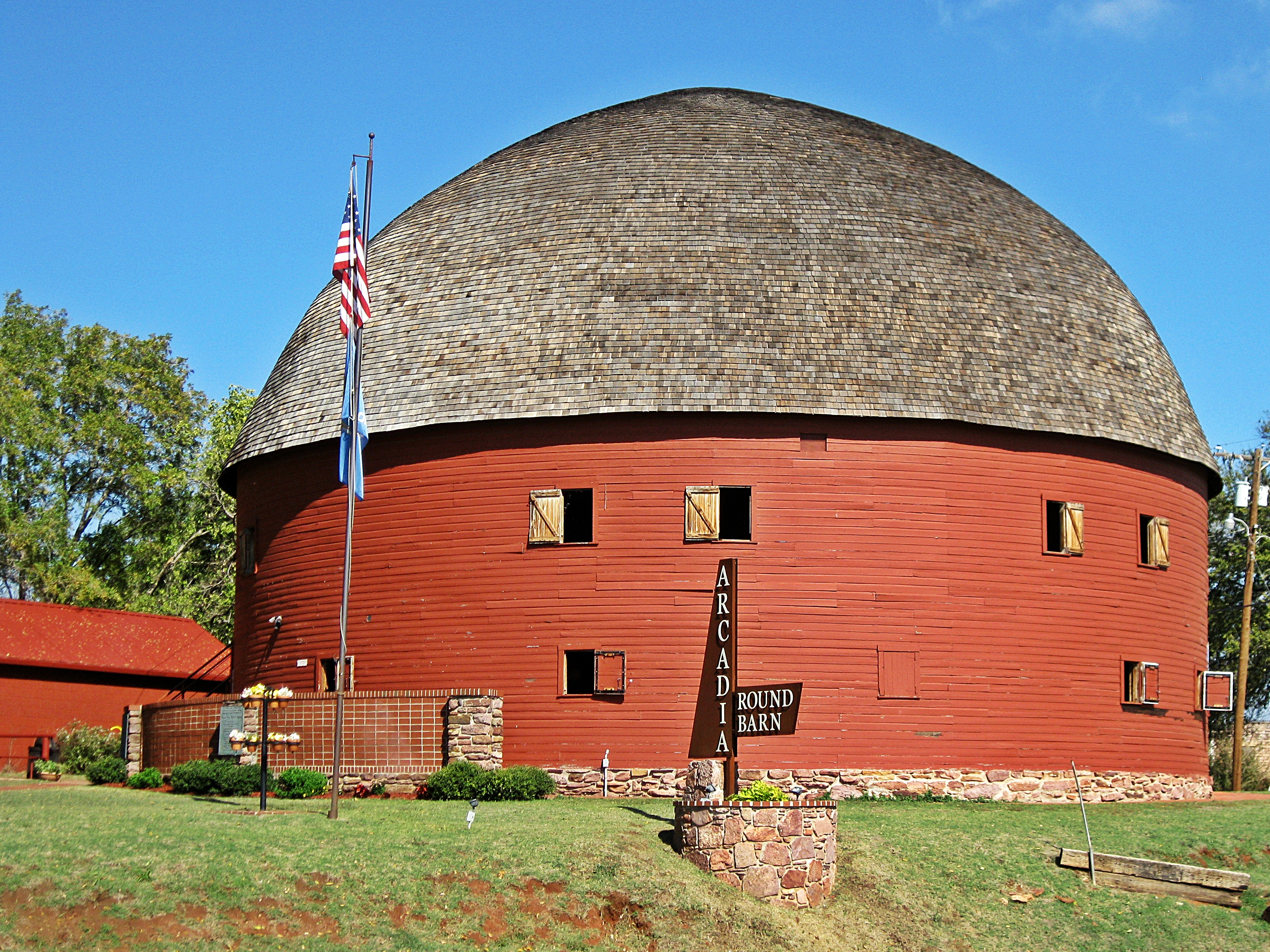
Arcadia round barn

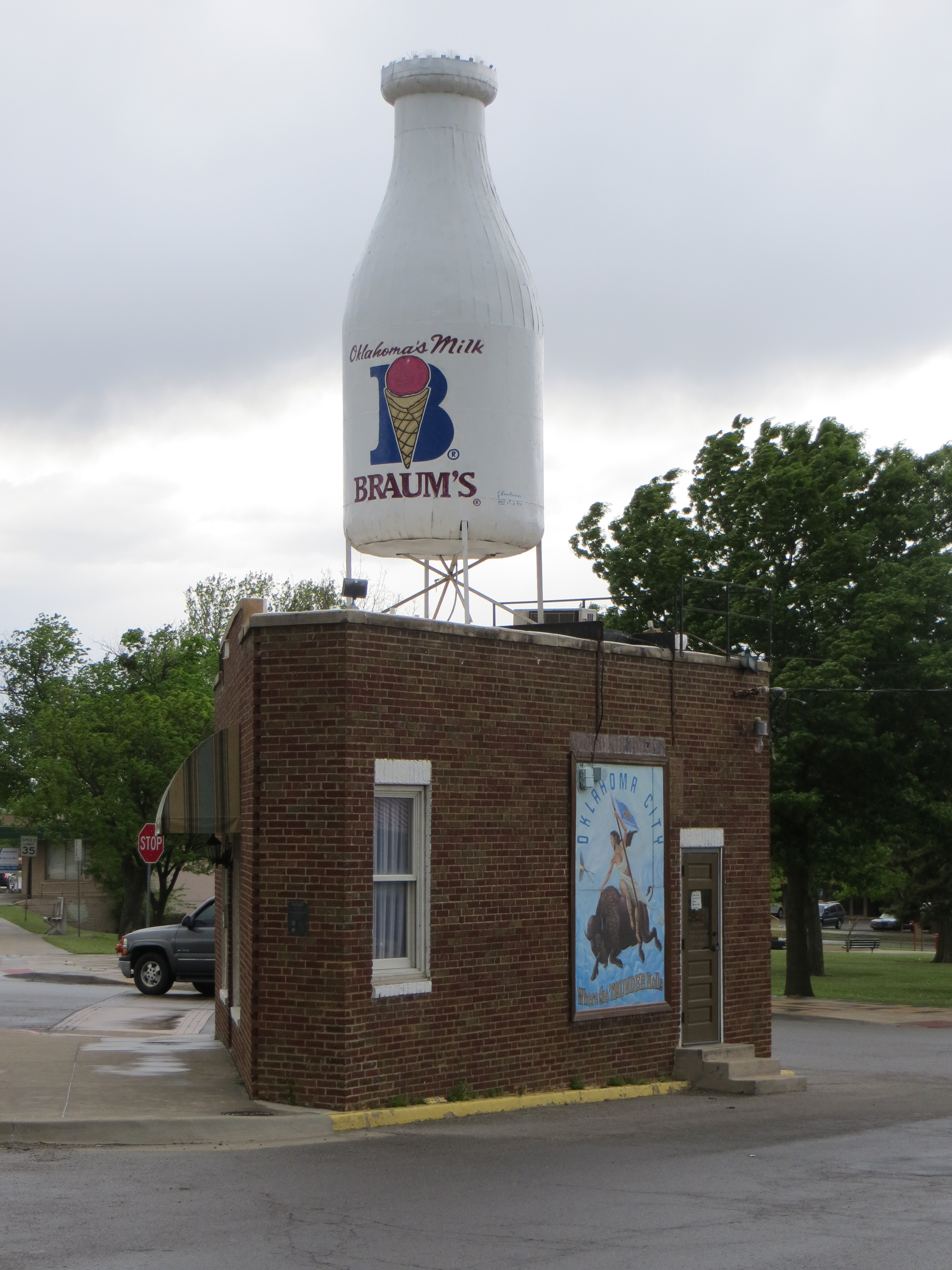
Milk Bottle Grocery

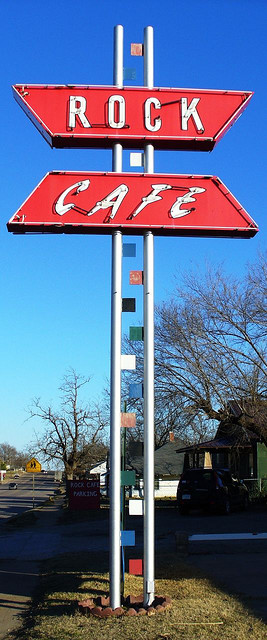
Rock Café

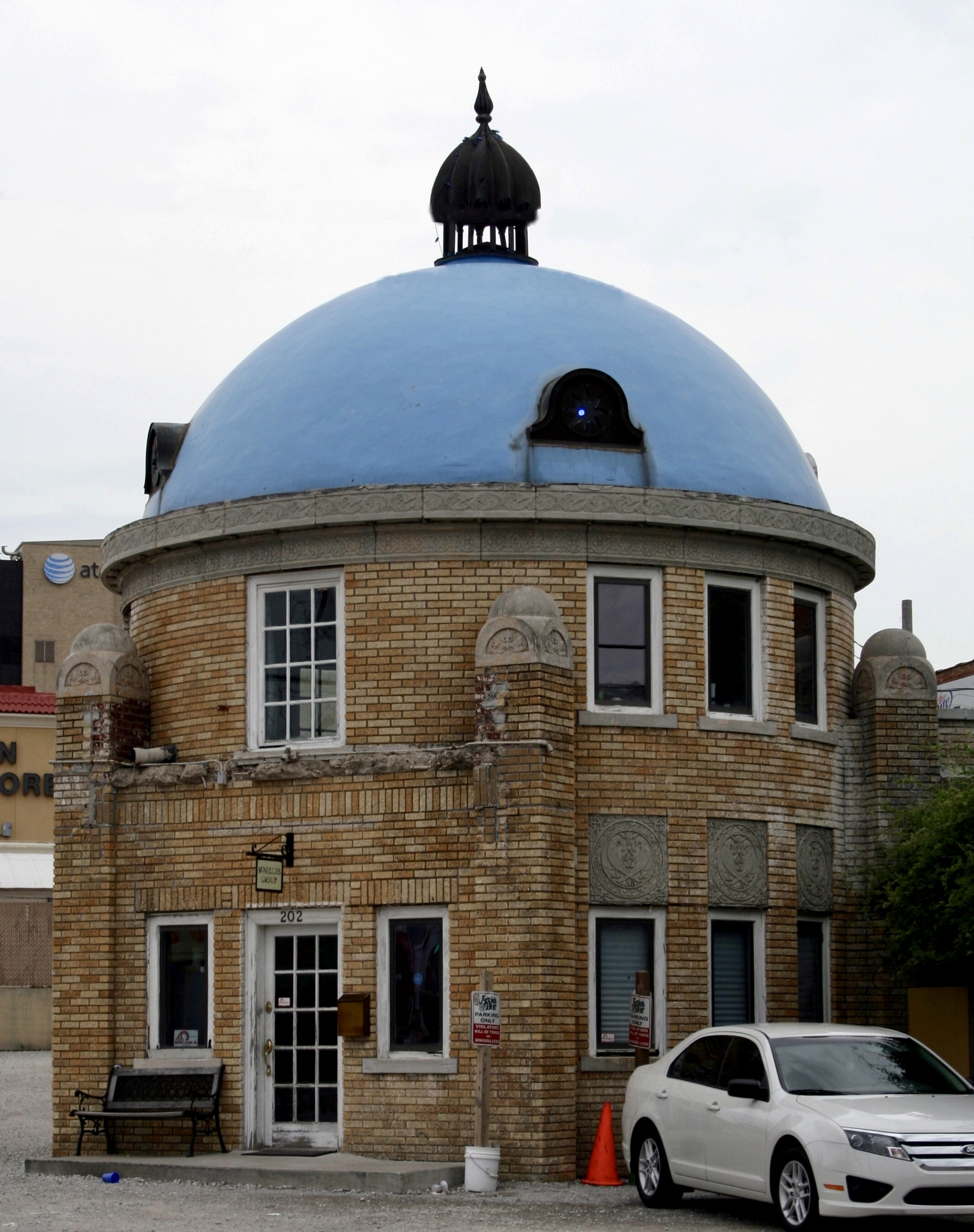
The Blue Dome

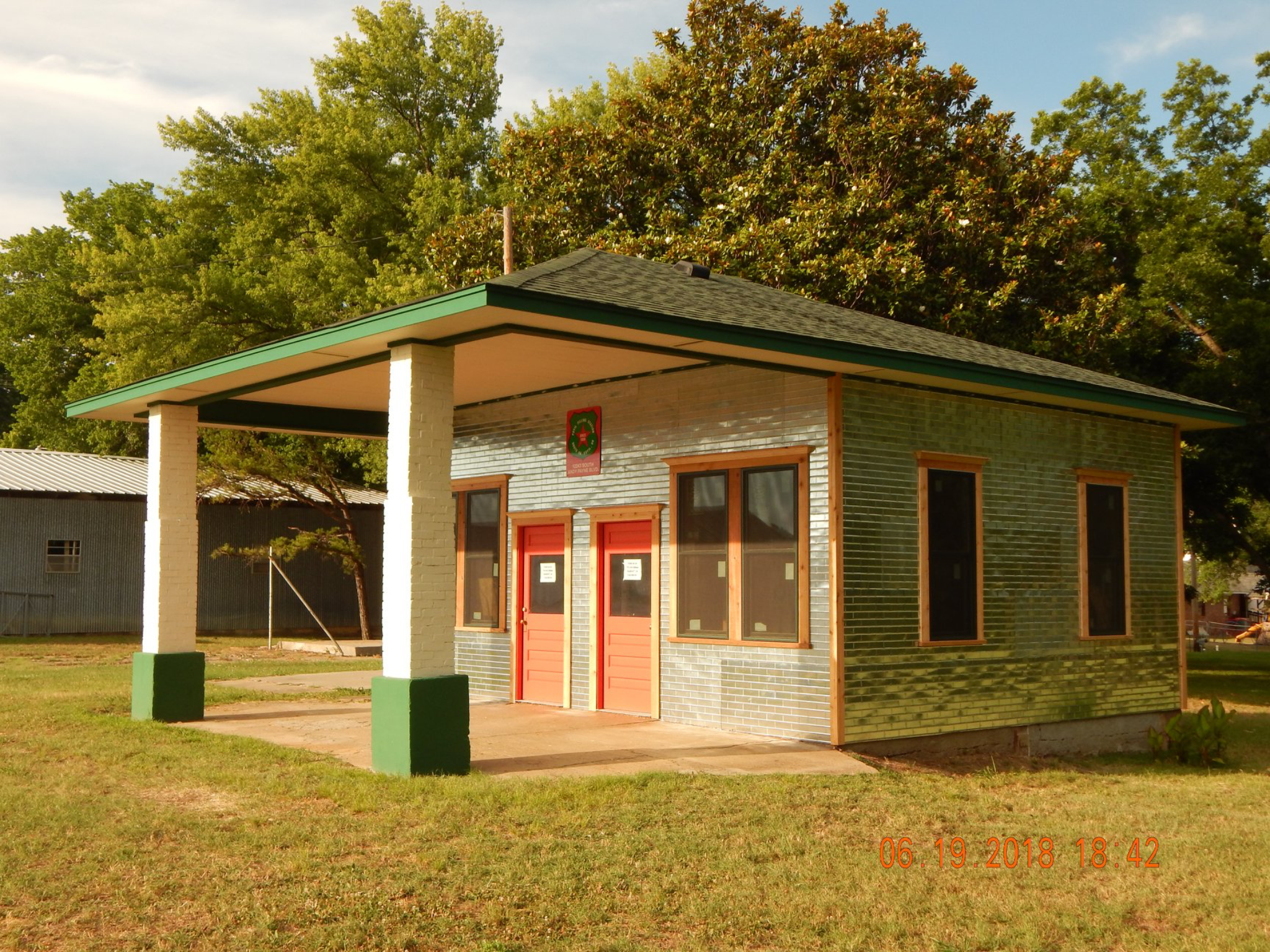
Foyil Filling Station

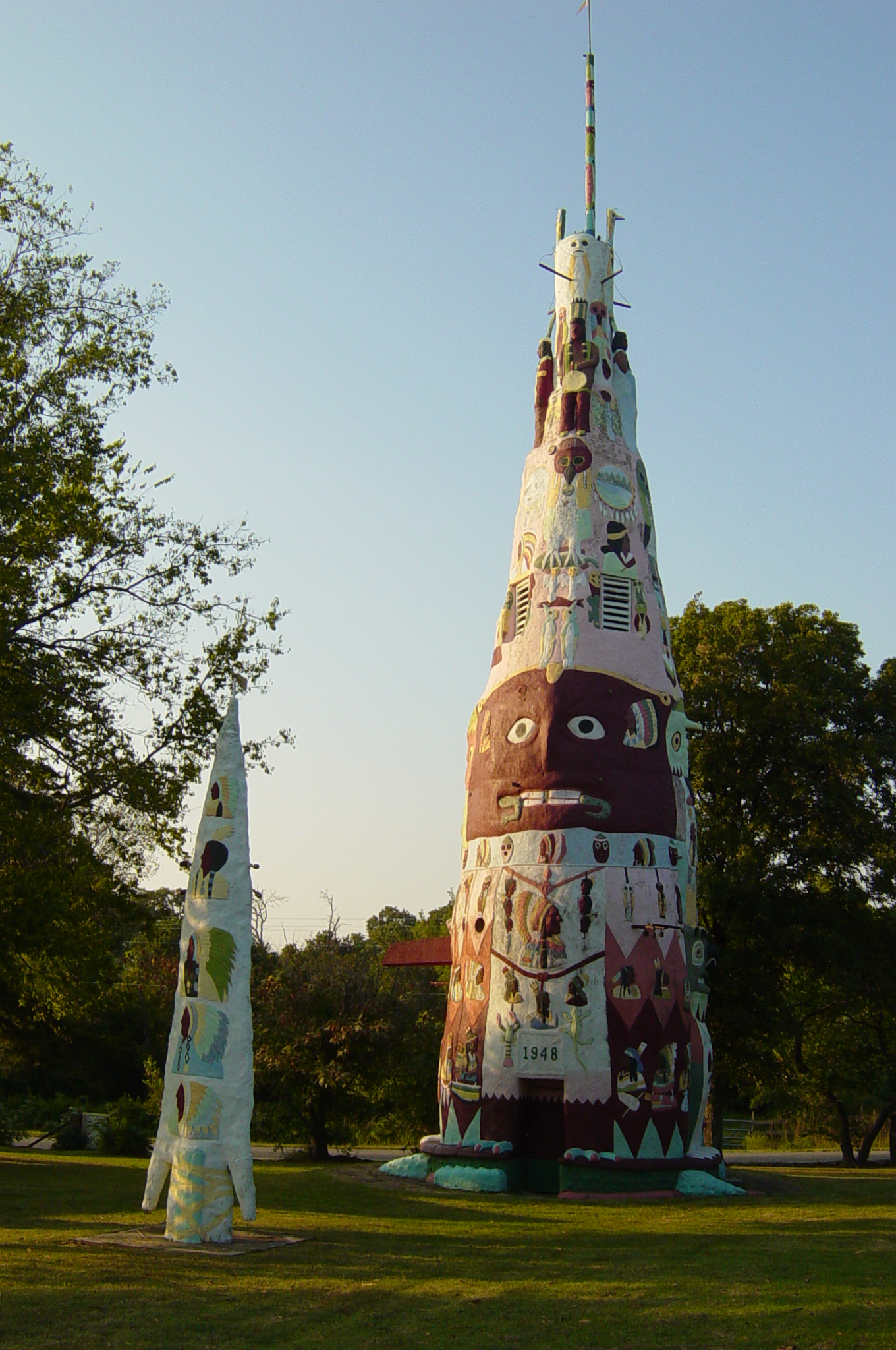
Ed Galloway's Totem Poles

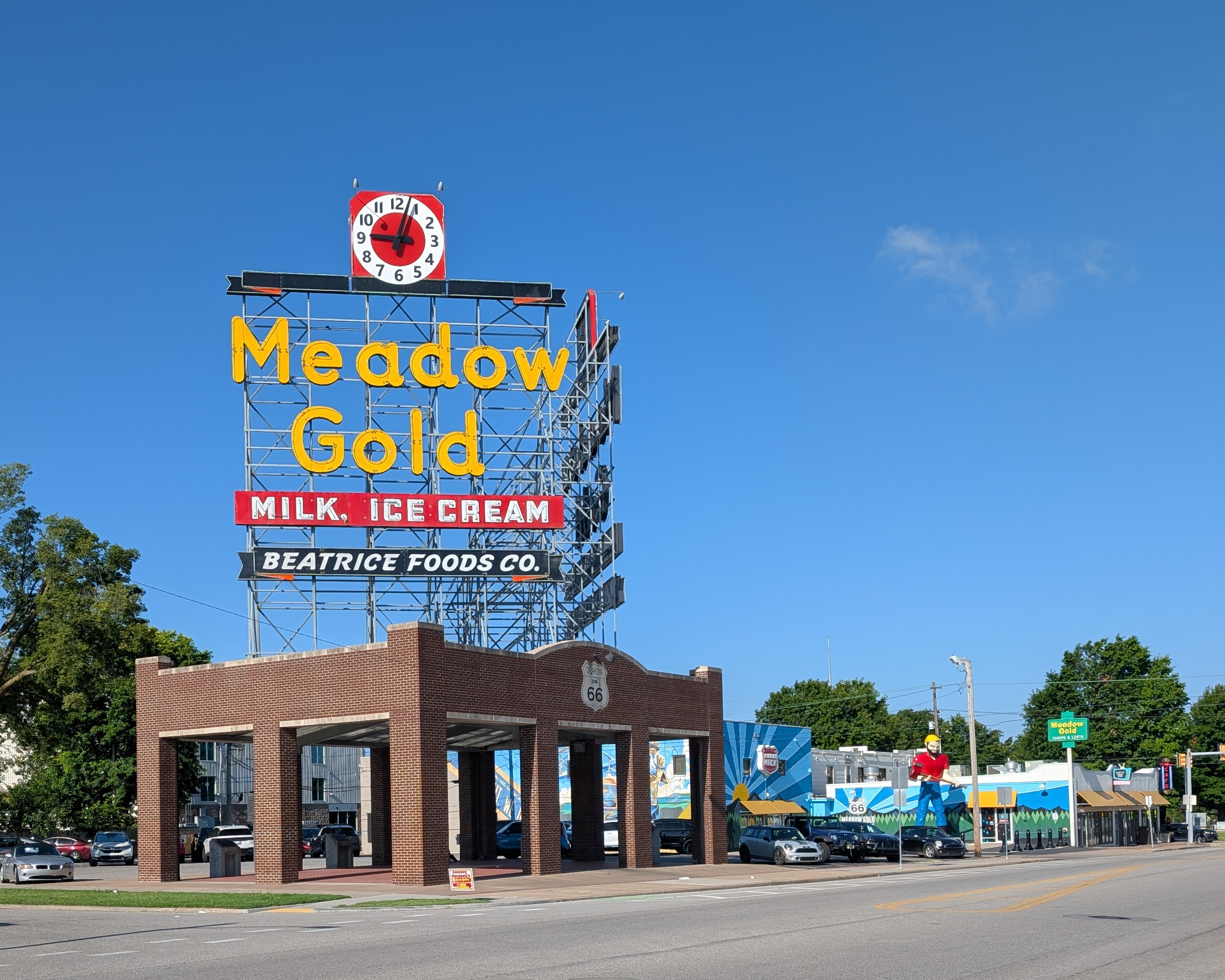
Meadow Gold sign

== Texas ==
- Leaning Tower of Britten (Groom) – A leaning water tower.
- Cadillac Ranch (Amarillo) – Public art installation created in 1974 by Chip Lord, Hudson Marquez and Doug Michels.
- The Big Texan Steak Ranch (Amarillo) – A steakhouse restaurant best known for its 72-ounce (4.5 pounds or 2.04 kg) steak challenge.
- U-Drop Inn (Shamrock) – A listed art deco gas station and restaurant, used as inspiration for one of the buildings in the cartoon village of Radiator Springs, in the movie Cars.
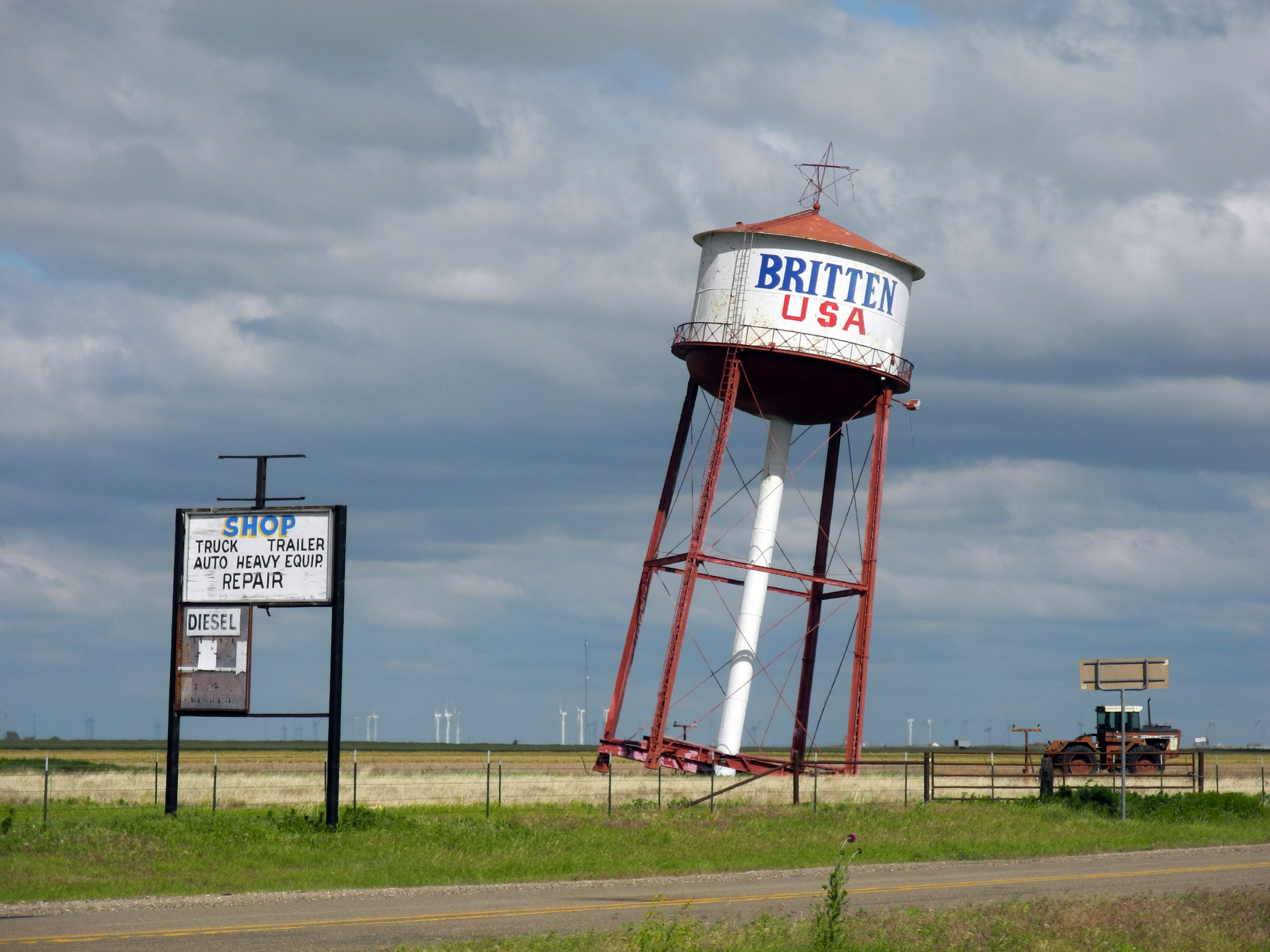
Leaning Tower of Britten

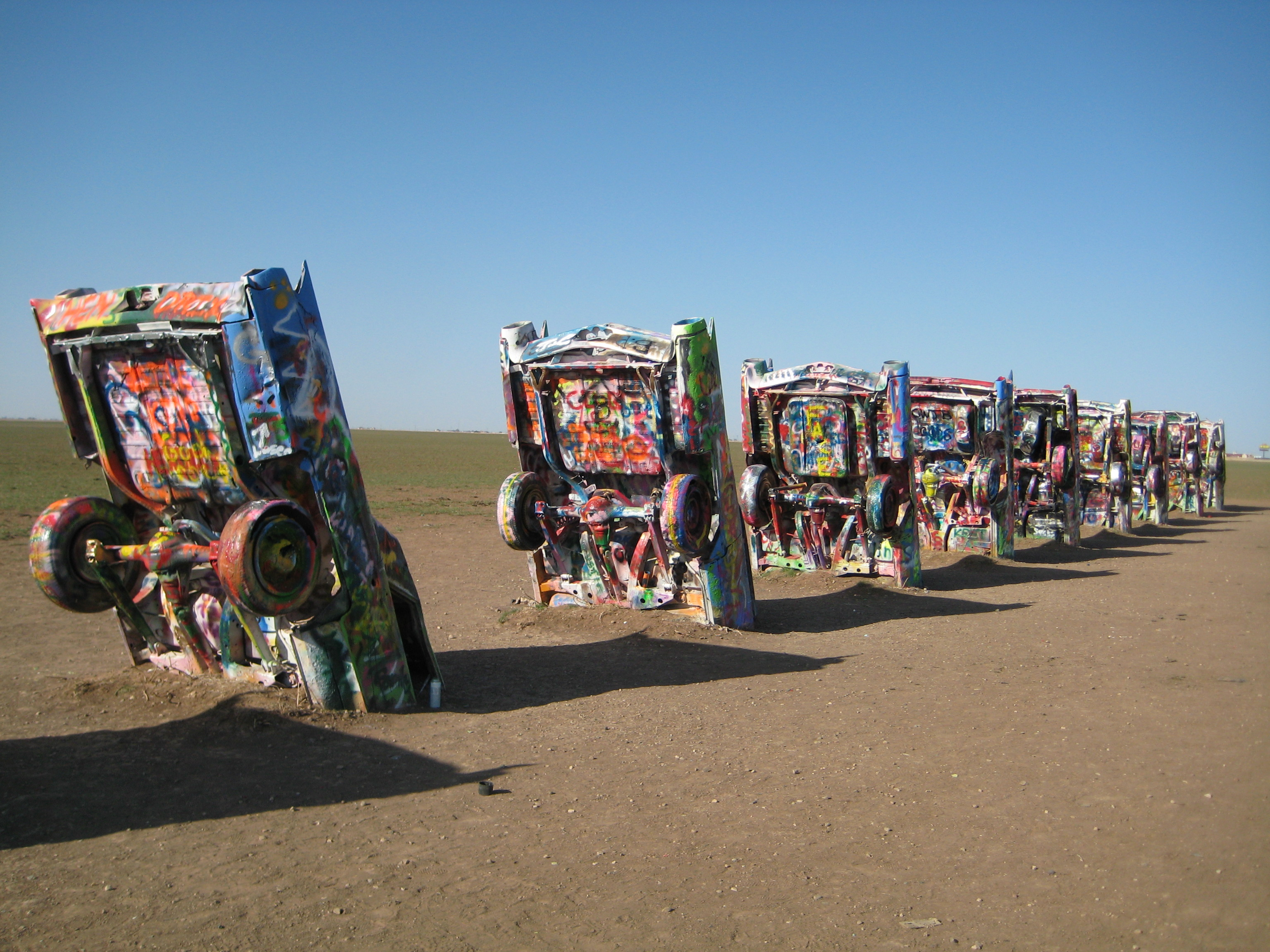
Cadillac Ranch

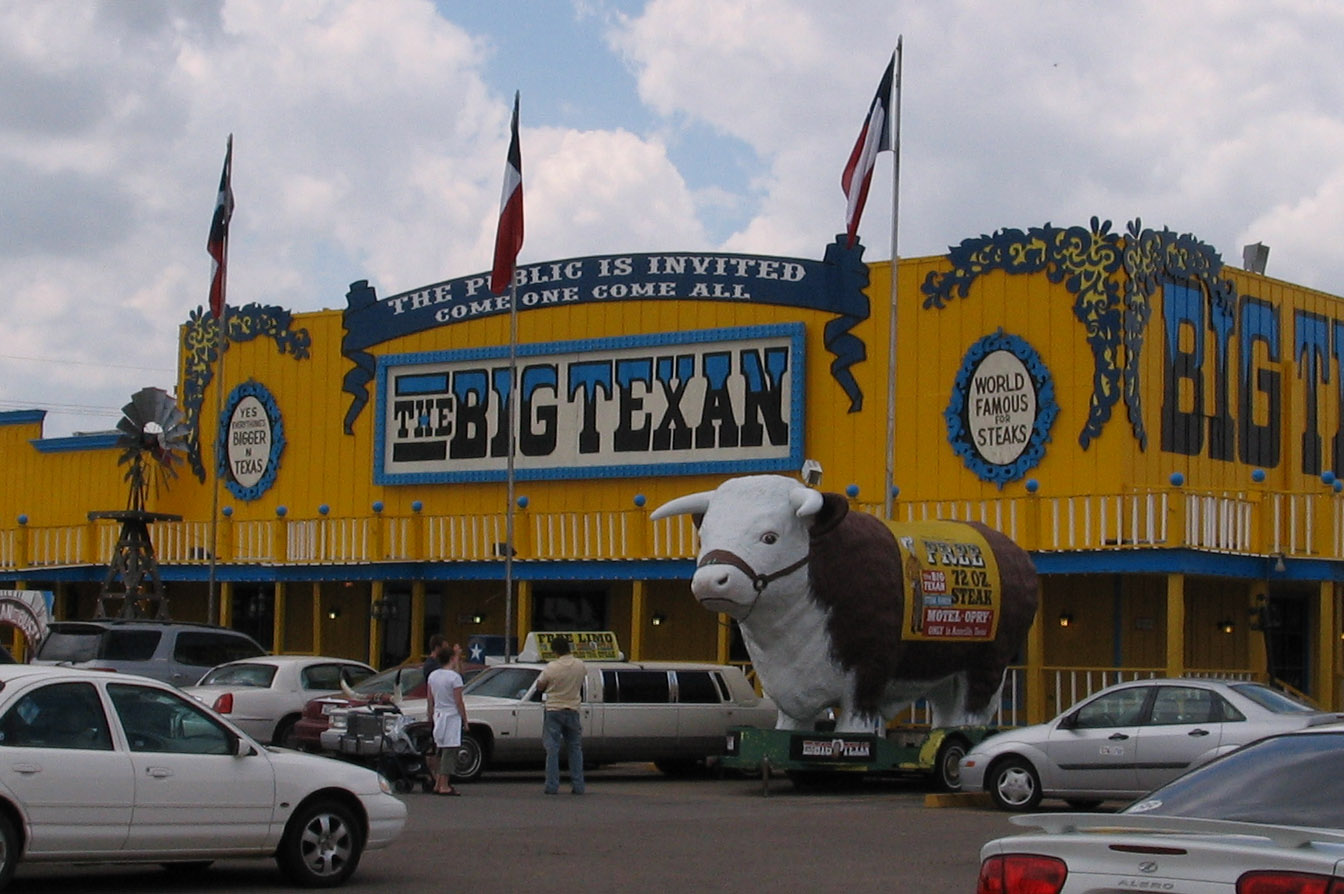
The Big Texan Steak Ranch

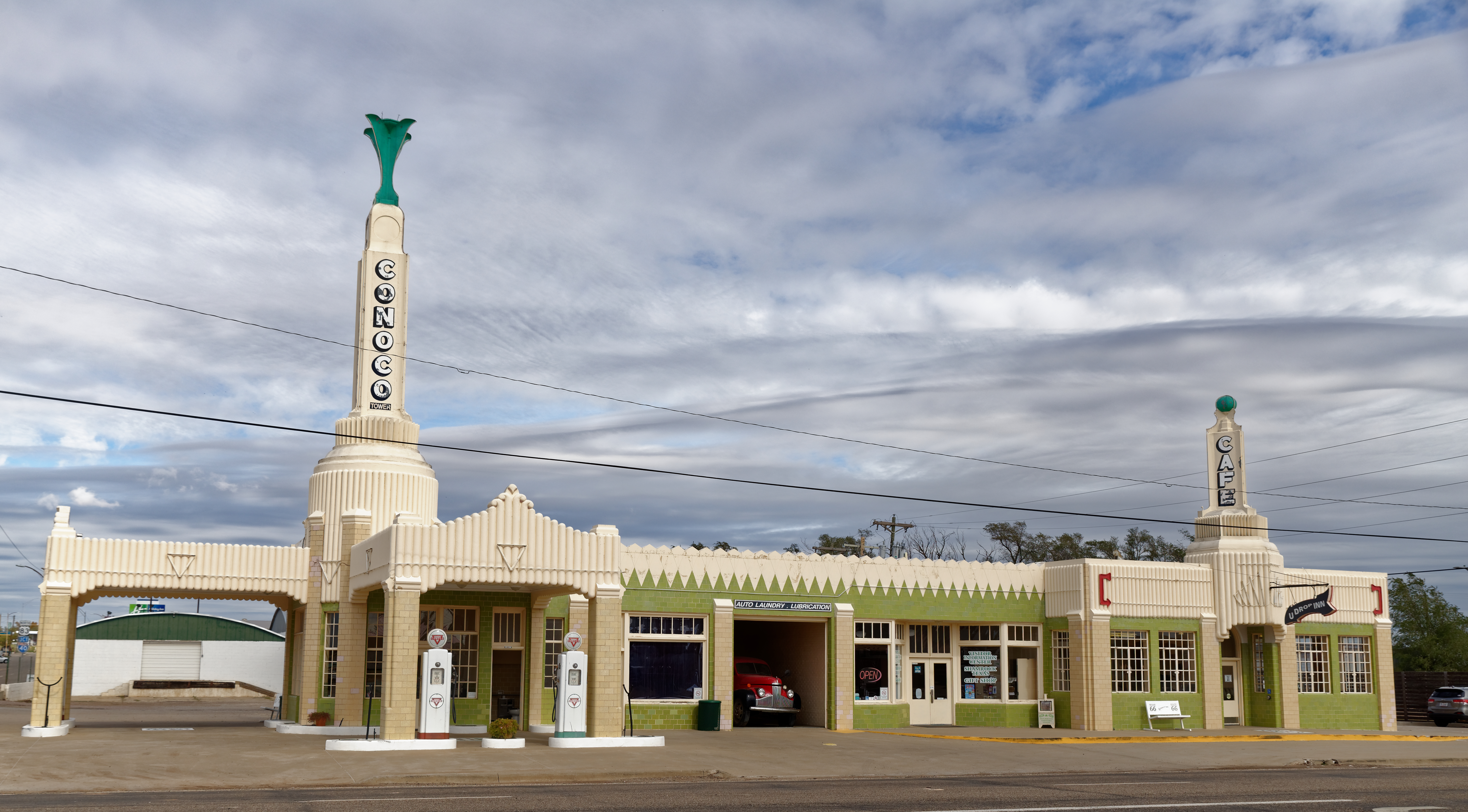
U-Drop Inn

== New Mexico ==
- Blue Swallow Motel (Tucumcari) – A Route 66 motel opened in 1942 and listed on the National Register of Historic Places in 1993.
- El Rancho Hotel & Motel (Gallup) – A Route 66 hotel opened in 1936. Film crews and actors used it as a base for productions near Gallup through the mid-1960s.
- Aztec Motel (Albuquerque) – A tourist court built in 1933 as the Aztec Auto Court. It was demolished in 2011.
- Maisel's Indian Trading Post (Albuquerque) – A trading post completed in 1939 in a Pueblo Revival building designed by John Gaw Meem. Olive Rush designed the murals on its facade.
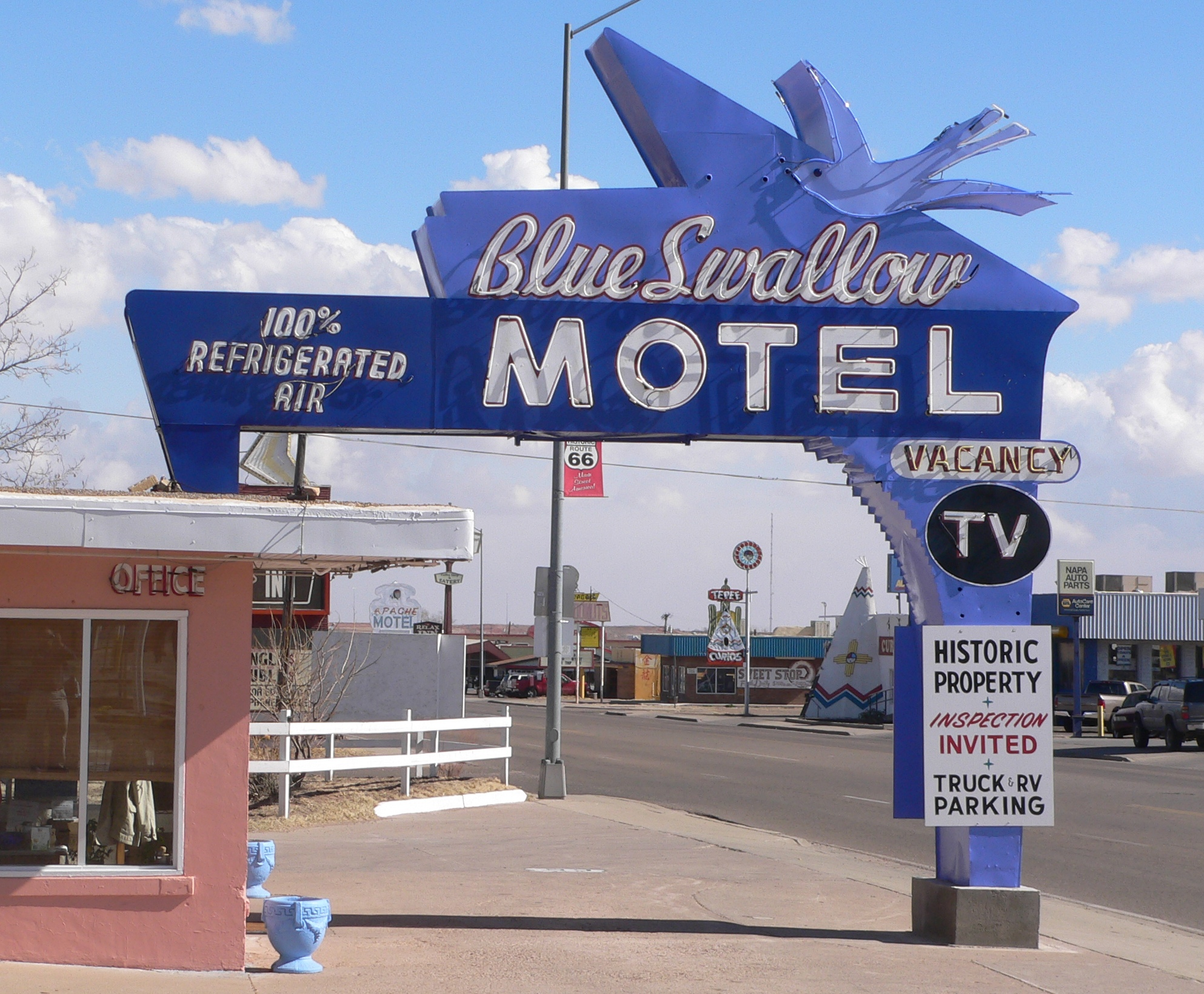
Blue Swallow Motel

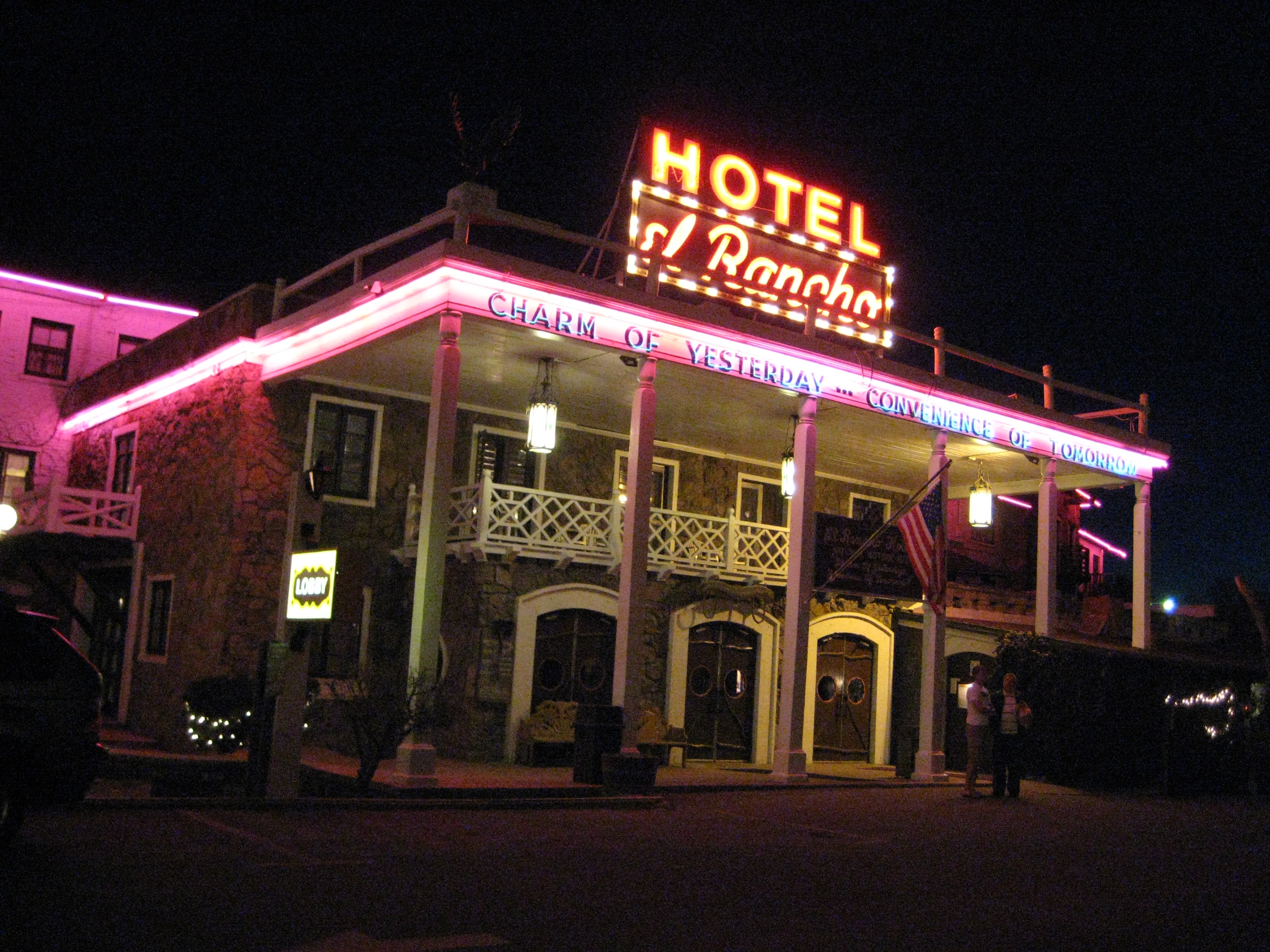
El Rancho Hotel

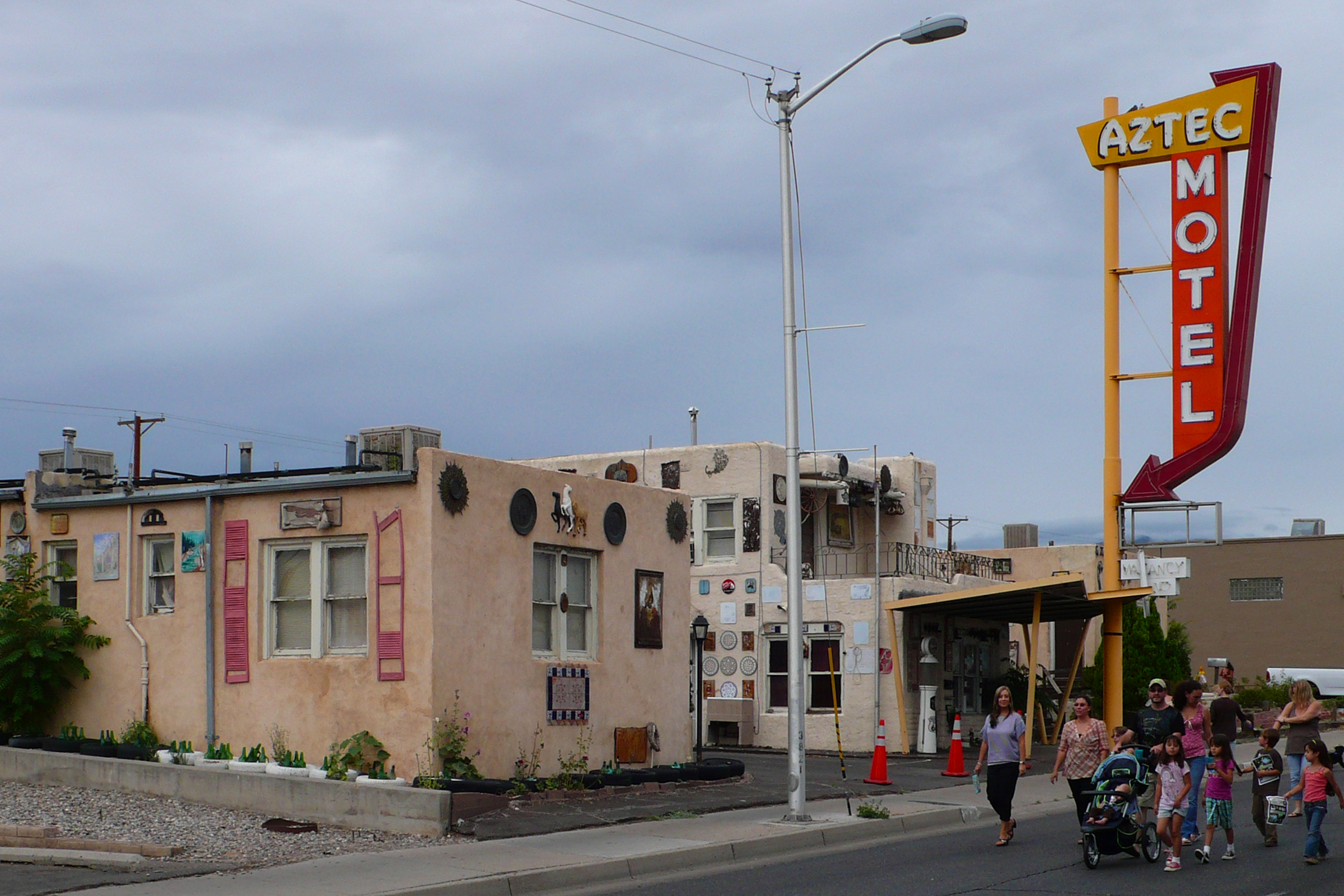
Aztec Motel

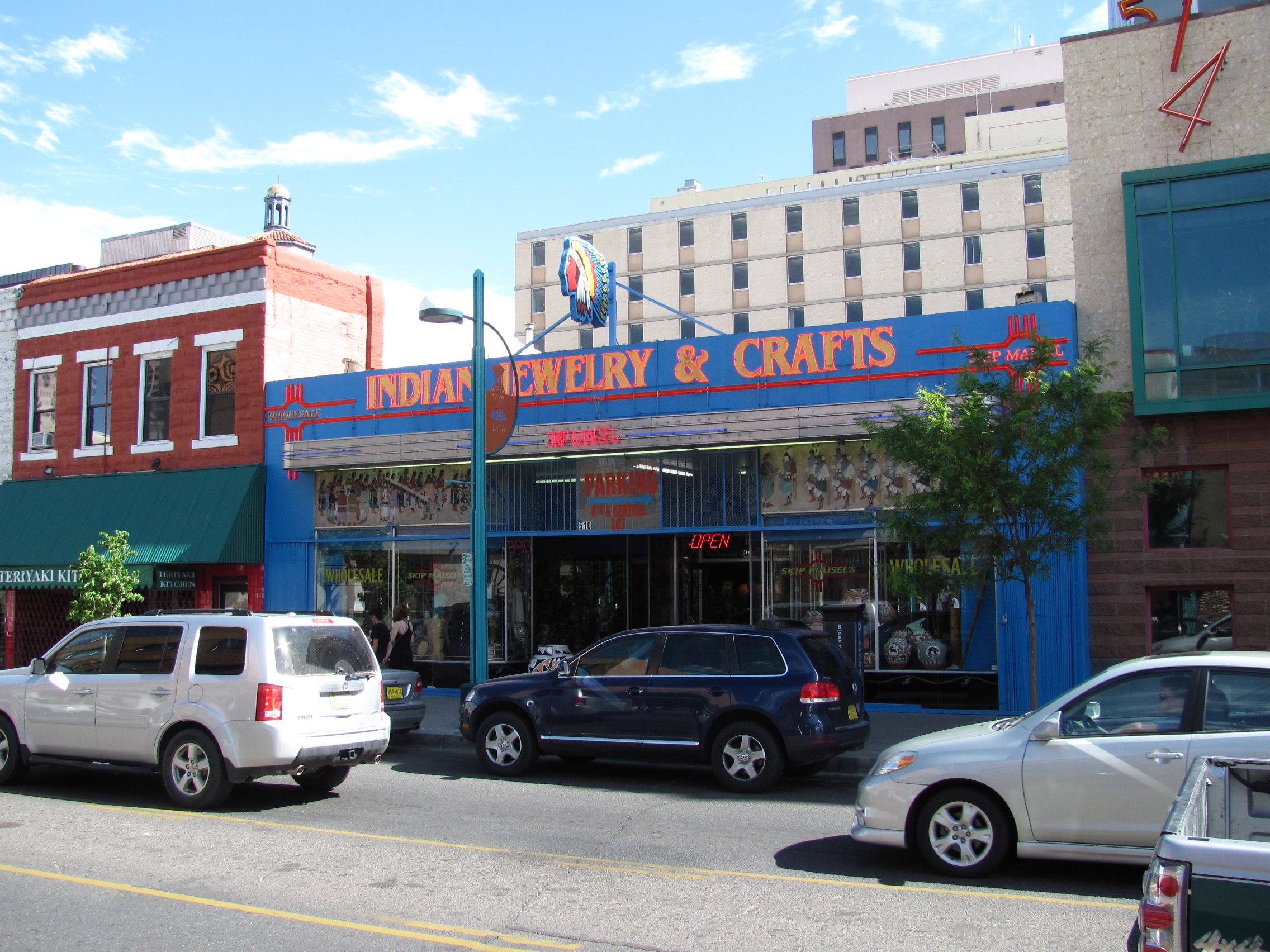
Maisel's Indian Trading Post

== Arizona ==
- Wigwam Motel (Holbrook) – A motel completed in 1950 with 15 freestanding concrete and steel tipi-shaped rooms. Two other Wigwam Villages remain, in Kentucky and California.
- Standin' on the Corner Park (Winslow) – A public park centered on the Winslow reference in "Take It Easy", recorded by the Eagles. The corner has a mural, statues and a flatbed Ford.
- Jack Rabbit Trading Post (Joseph City) – A curio shop begun in 1949, advertised by its "Here It Is" sign and a large rabbit statue.
- Delgadillo's Snow Cap Drive-In (Seligman) – A drive-in restaurant built by Juan Delgadillo in 1953 from leftover lumber.
- Meteor City, Arizona (near Winslow) – A Route 66 roadside stop whose site began as a gas station in 1938. After closing in 2012, it reopened to the public in 2025 as Meteor City on Route 66.
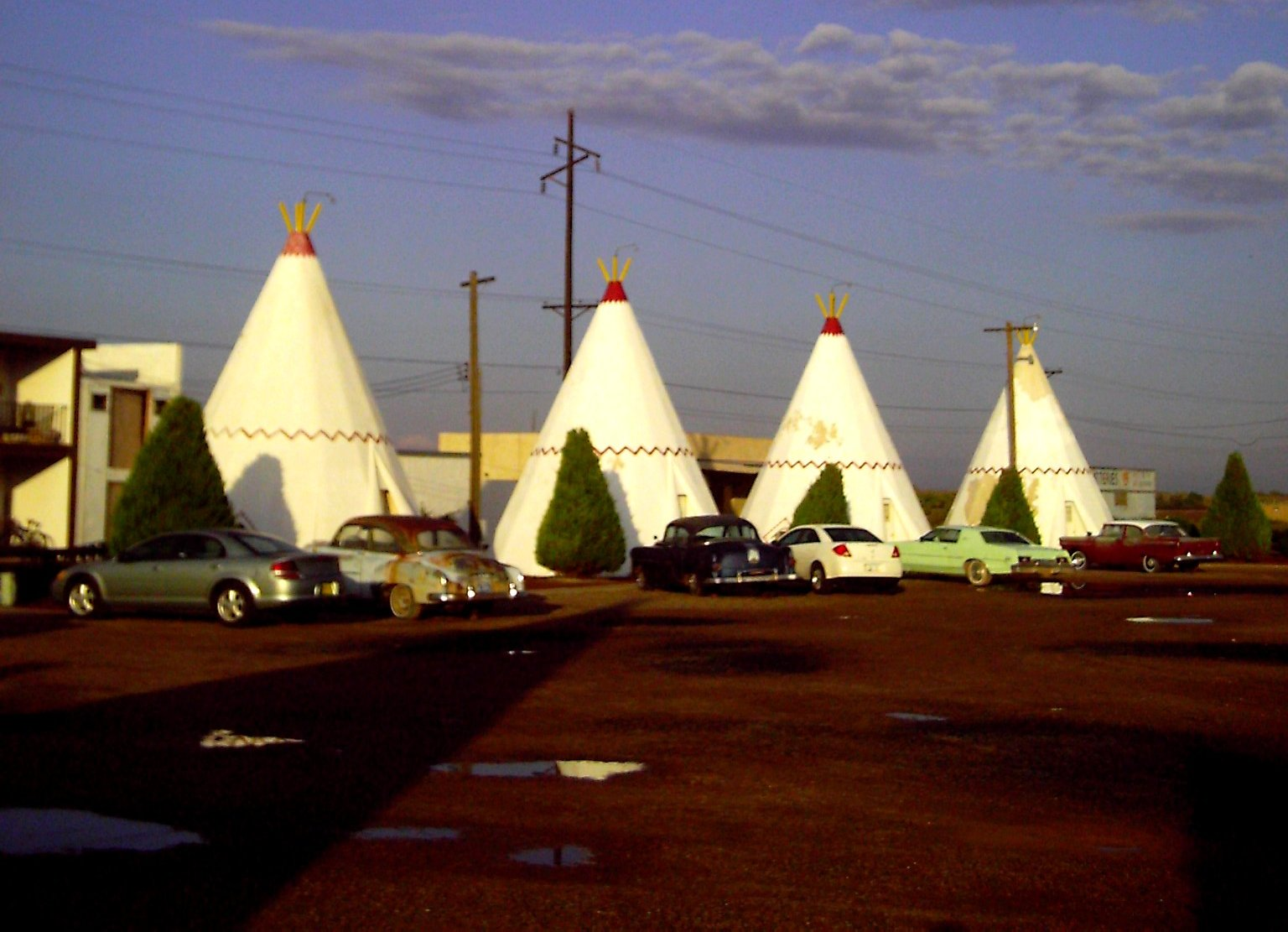
Wigwam Motel

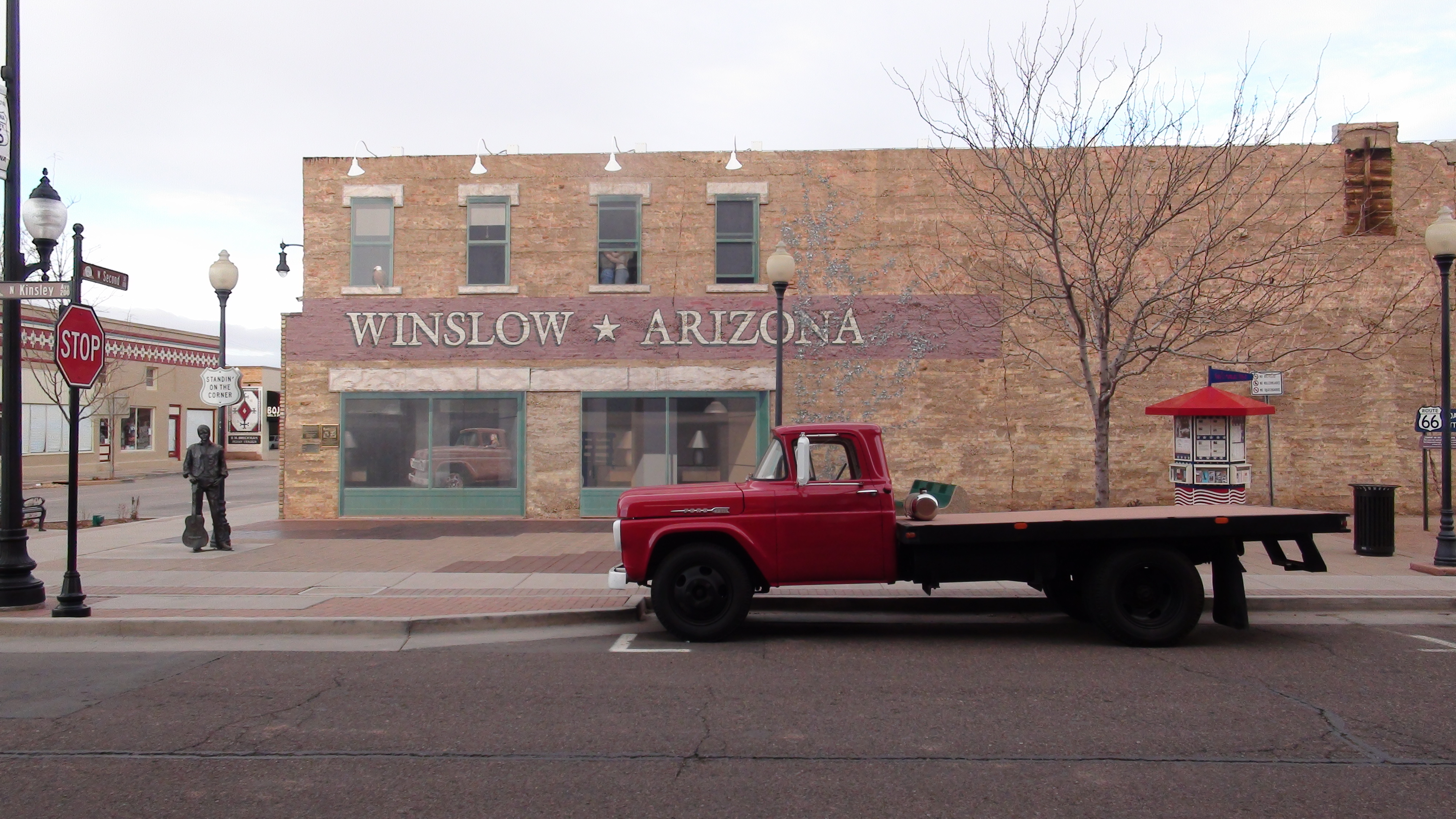
Standin' on the Corner Park

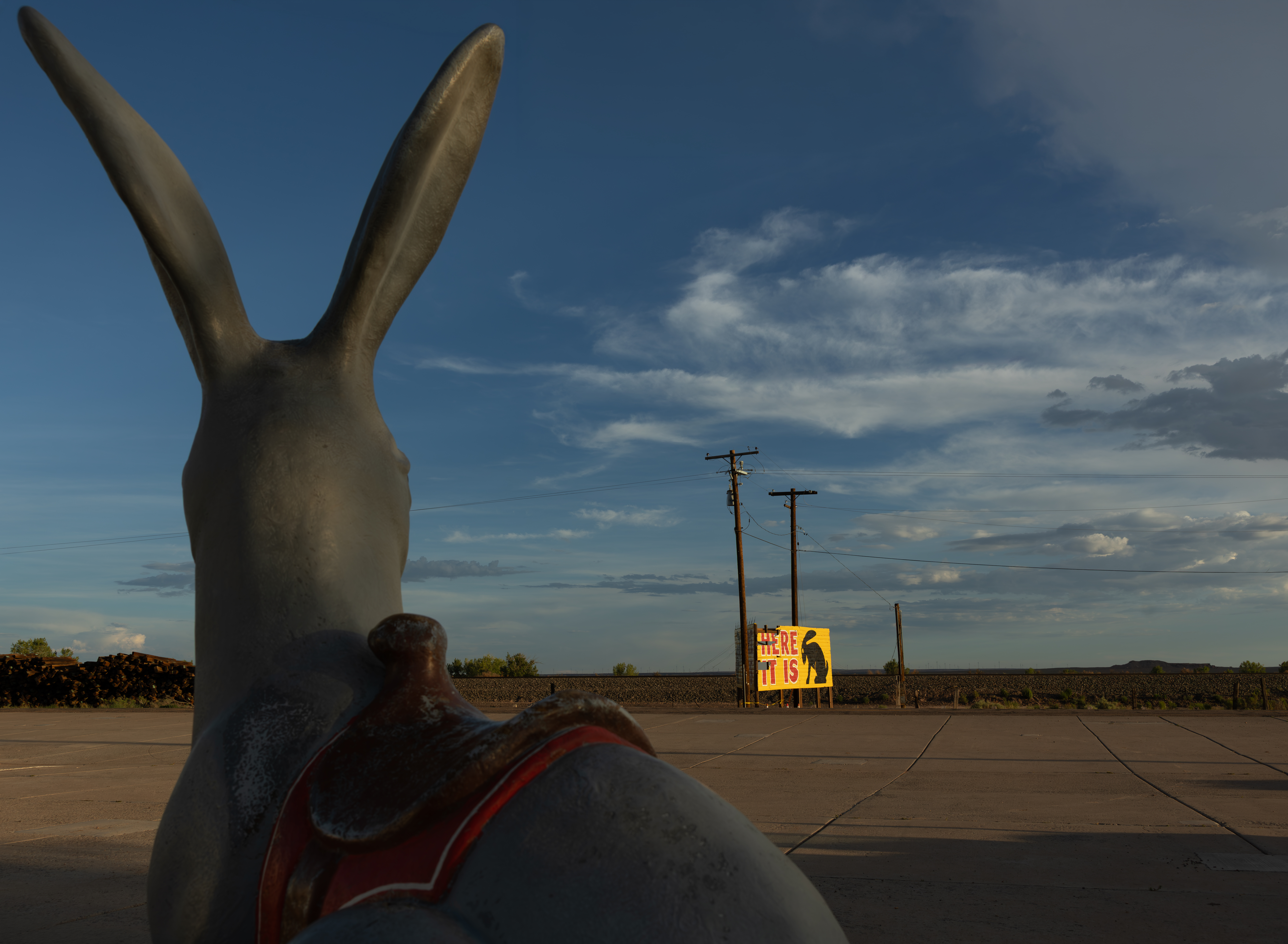
Fiberglass jackrabbit sculpture and "Here It Is" sign at the Jack Rabbit Trading Post

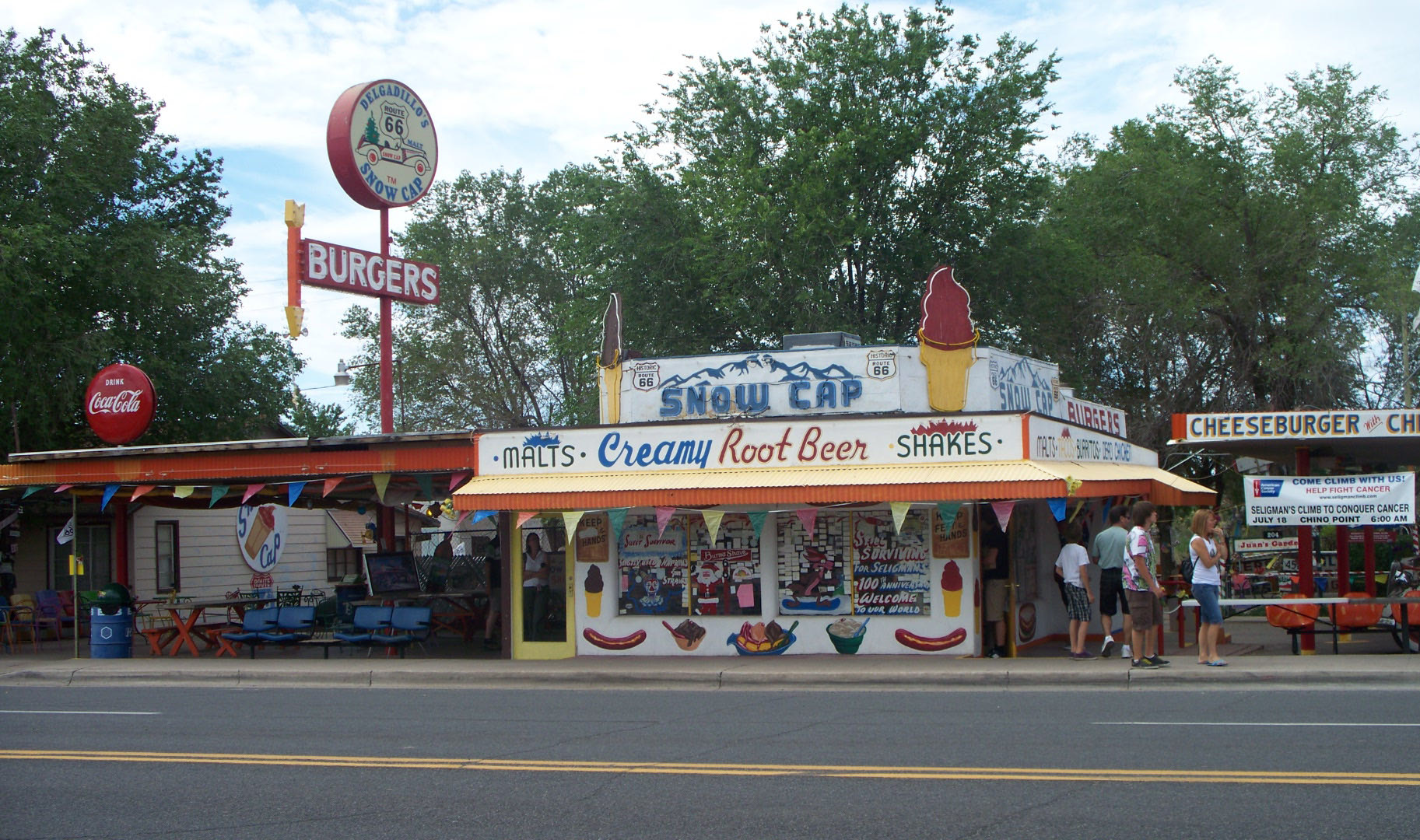
Delgadillo's Snow Cap Drive-In

== California ==
- Elmer's Bottle Tree Ranch (Oro Grande) – An outdoor installation begun by Elmer Long around 2000, with metal "trees" covered in colored glass bottles and found objects.
- Wigwam Village #7 (San Bernardino) – A Route 66 motel opened in 1950 with 19 tipi-shaped cabins. It was listed on the National Register of Historic Places in 2012.
- Bagdad Cafe (Newberry Springs) – A Route 66 cafe formerly called the Sidewinder, where the film Bagdad Cafe was shot.
- 66 Motel (Needles) – A former motel just off the Route 66 alignment on Broadway, later converted to apartments.
- Cucamonga Service Station (Rancho Cucamonga) – A service station built in 1915, restored as a 1930s Richfield station and opened as a museum with local and Route 66 artifacts.
- Bono's Historic Orange (Fontana) – A seven-foot orange-shaped juice stand built in 1936. Joe Bono moved it beside his restaurant in the 1990s. In 2022, the stand was placed in storage for repair and relocation.
- Old Trails Bridge (Needles) – A steel arch bridge built across the Colorado River in 1914 for the National Old Trails Road. It carried Route 66 traffic from 1926 until 1948, when its deck was removed for a natural gas pipeline.
- Aztec Hotel (Monrovia) – A 44-room hotel designed by Robert Stacy-Judd and opened in 1925. Its design drew on Maya art and architecture, while Stacy-Judd chose the "Aztec" name because he thought it would be more familiar to the public.
- Chicken Boy (Los Angeles) – A fiberglass figure with the body of a Muffler Man and the head of a chicken. It originally stood above a fried-chicken restaurant in downtown Los Angeles and was installed on a building in Highland Park in 2007.
- Roy's Motel and Café (Amboy) – A Route 66 motel, cafe and gas station complex whose neon sign was erected in 1959. The motel and cafe have been closed for decades, while the site sells gasoline, snacks and souvenirs.
- Summit Inn (Cajon Pass) – A Route 66 roadside diner established at Cajon Pass in 1952. The building was destroyed by the Blue Cut Fire in 2016.
- Barstow Harvey House (Barstow) – The present Harvey House and railroad depot, known as Casa del Desierto, was built from 1910 to 1913. The Route 66 Mother Road Museum opened in the depot in 2000.
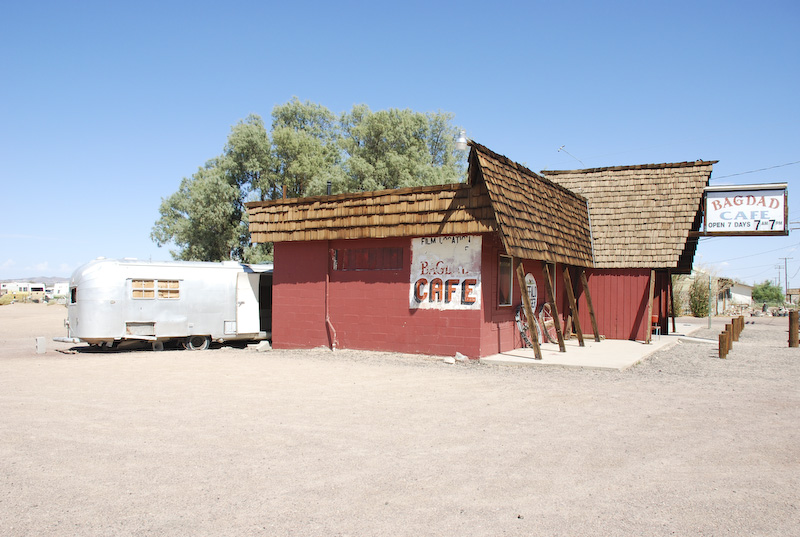
Bagdad Cafe

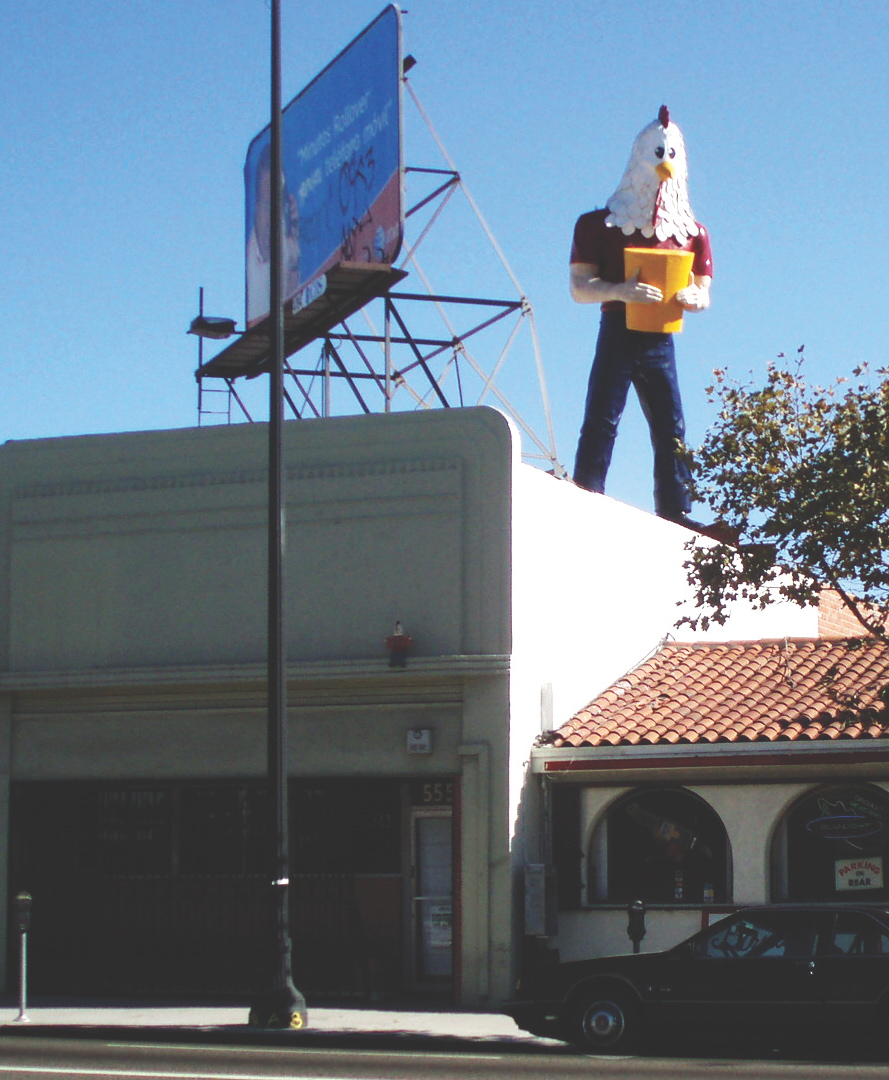
Chicken Boy

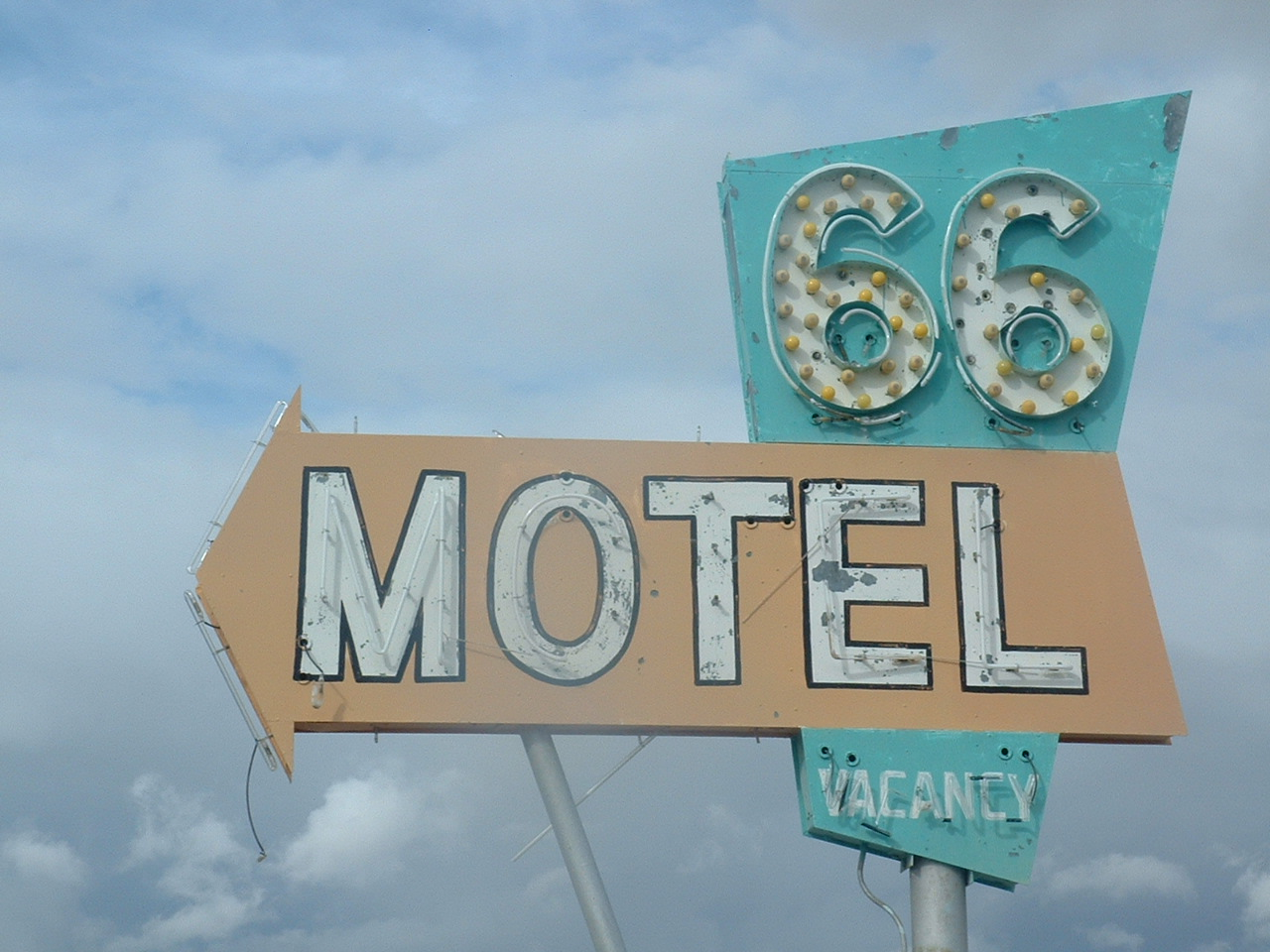
Route 66 Motel sign

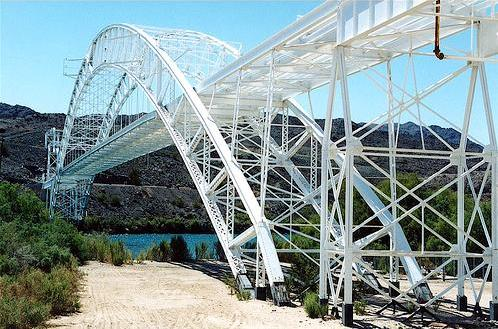
Old Trails Bridge

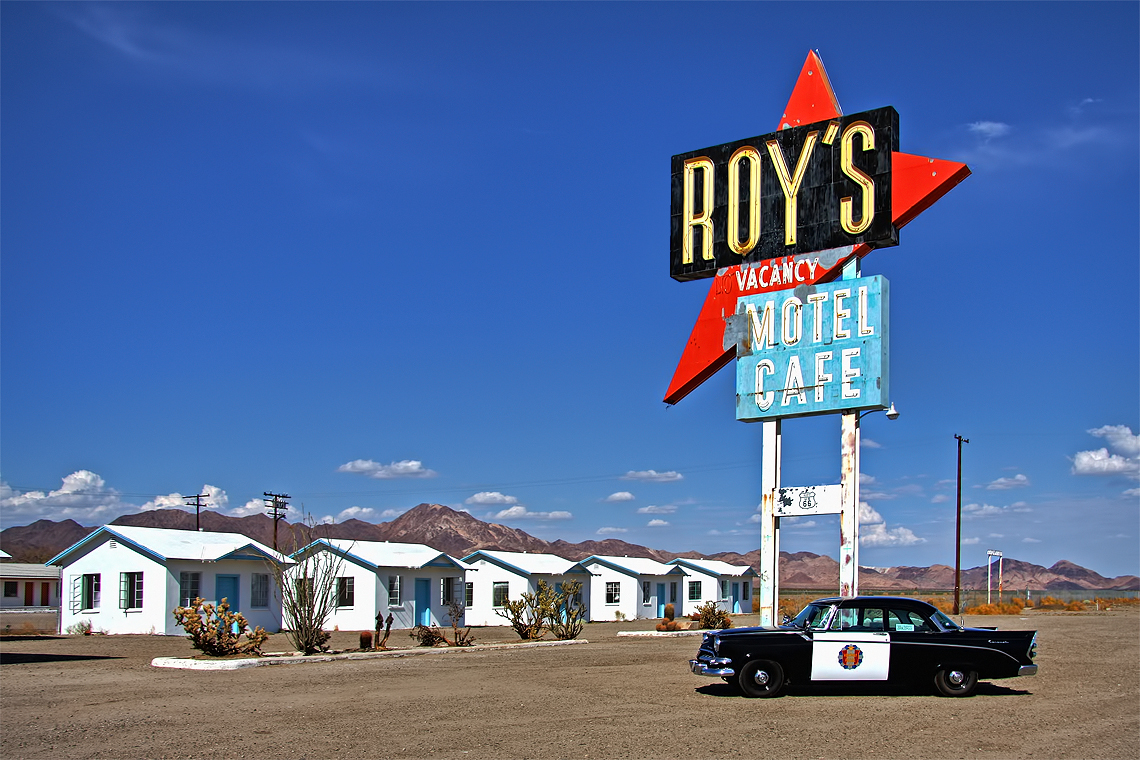
Sign for Roy's Motel and Café

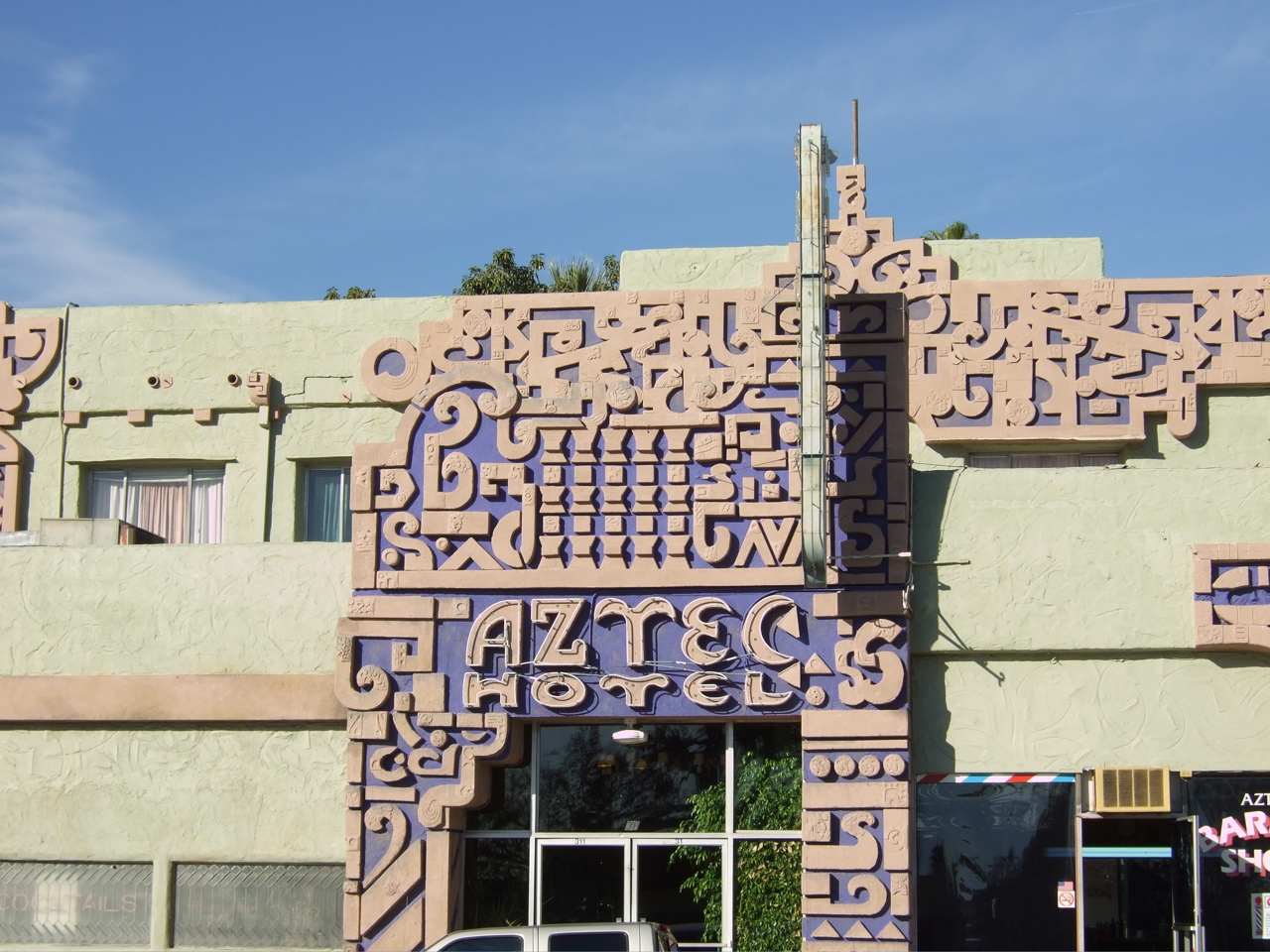
Part of the facade of the Aztec Hotel

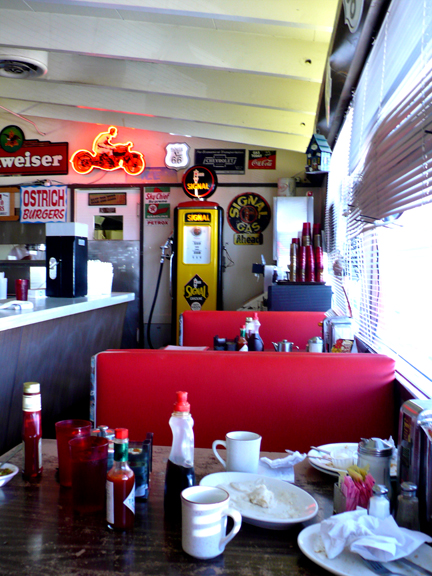
Summit Inn, photographed in 2007

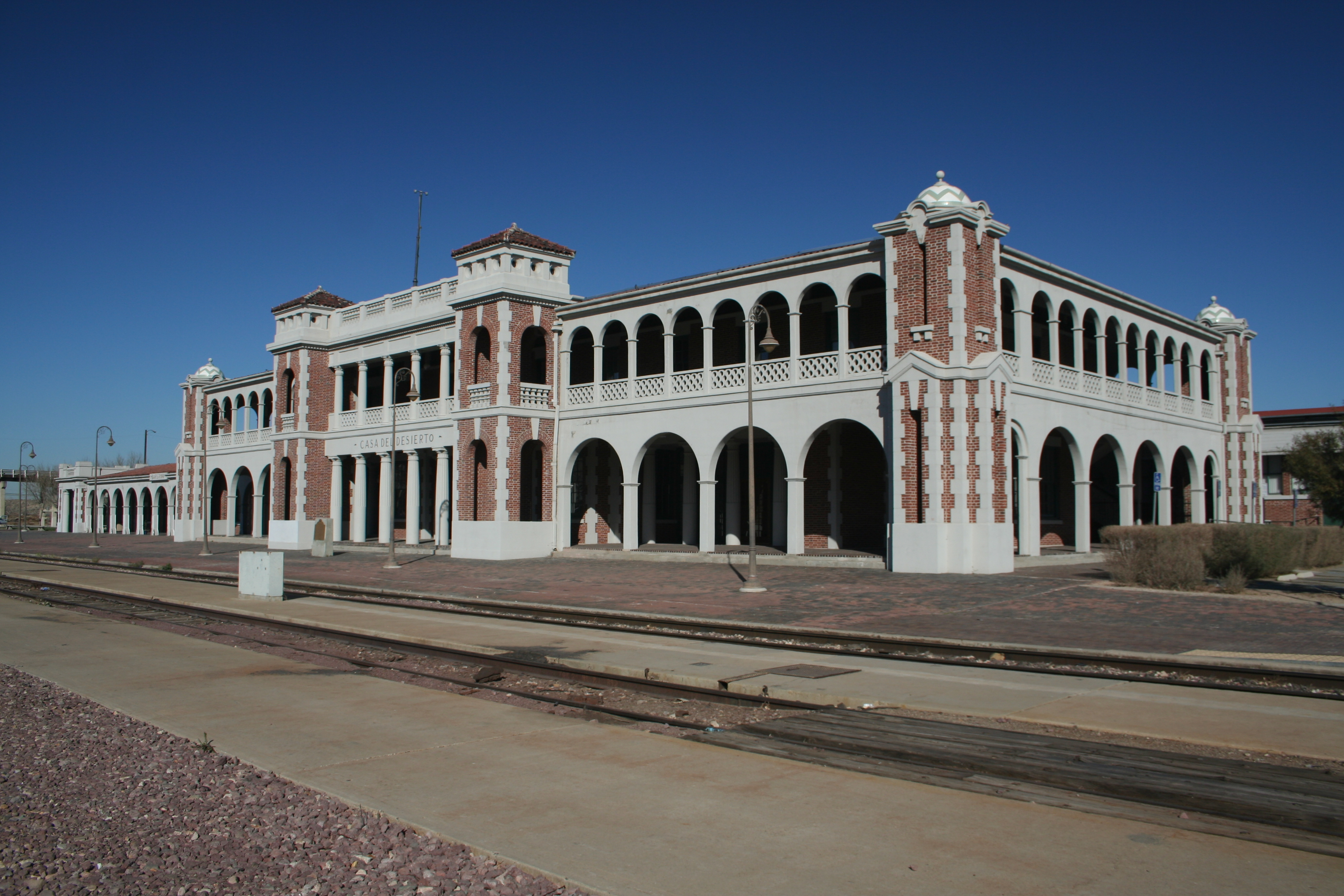
Barstow Harvey House in 2006

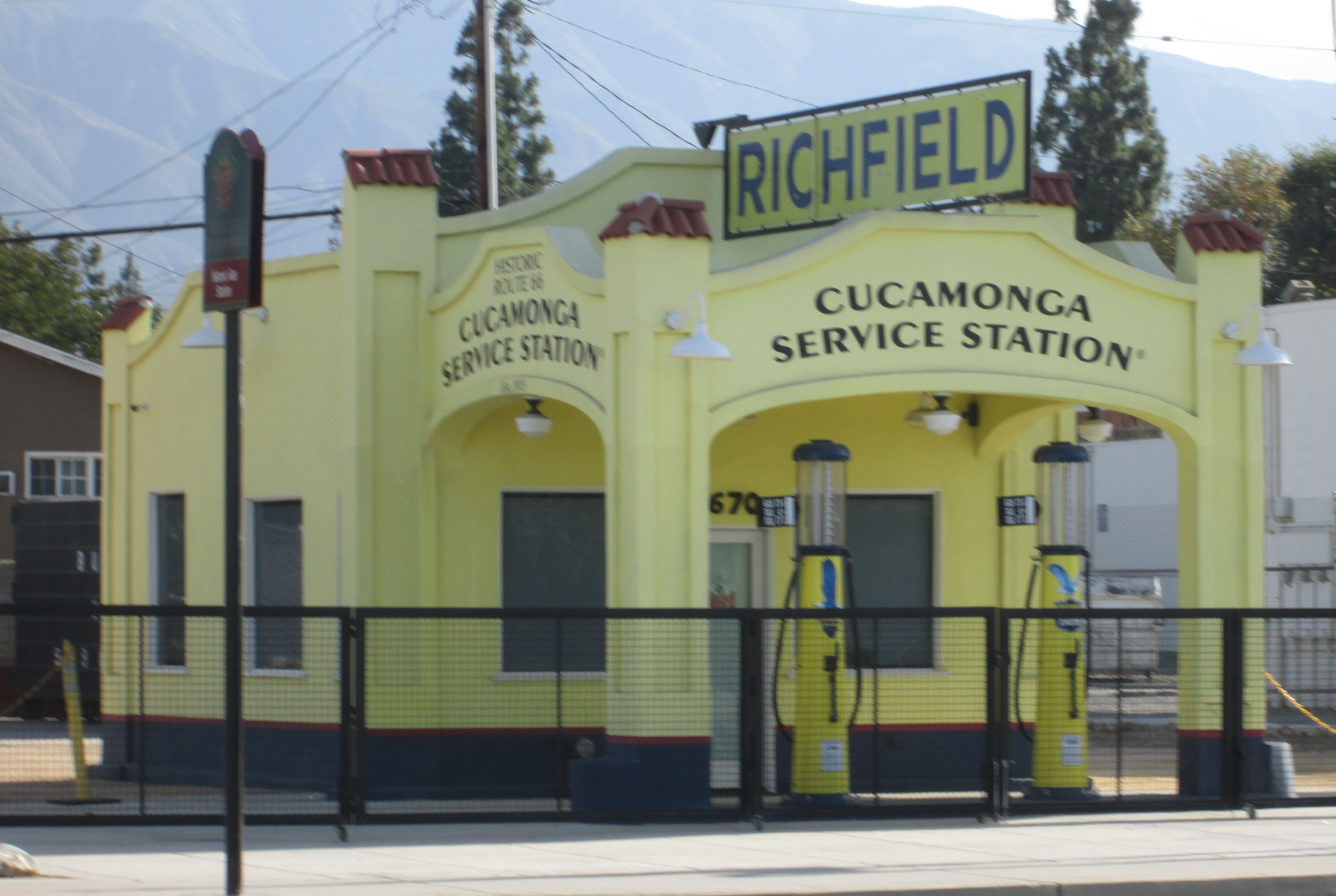
Cucamonga Service Station

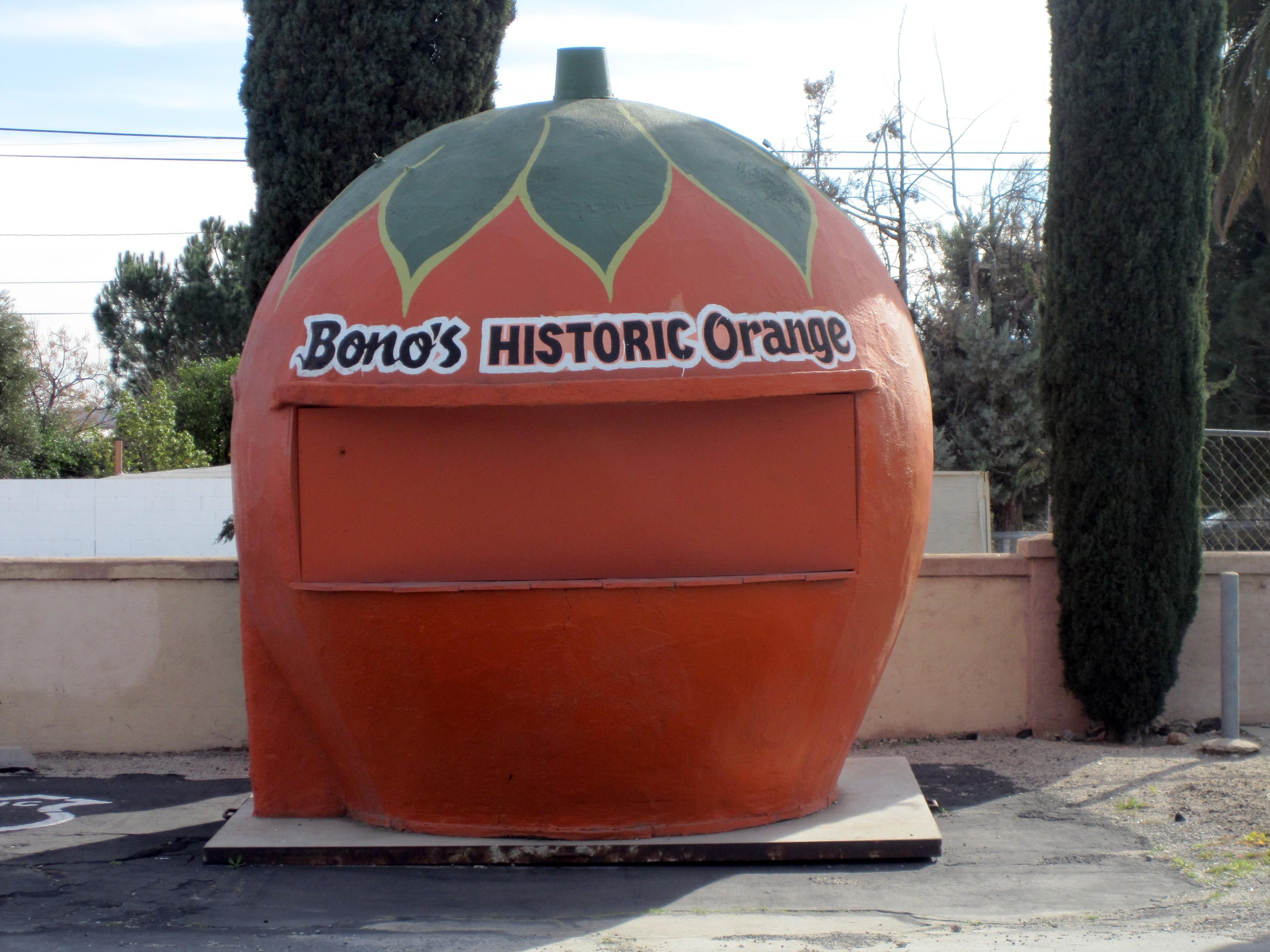
Bono's Historic Orange

== See also ==
- List of Route 66 museums
- U.S. Route 66
- Roadside attraction
