= Cucamonga Service Station =

- U.S. National Register of Historic Places
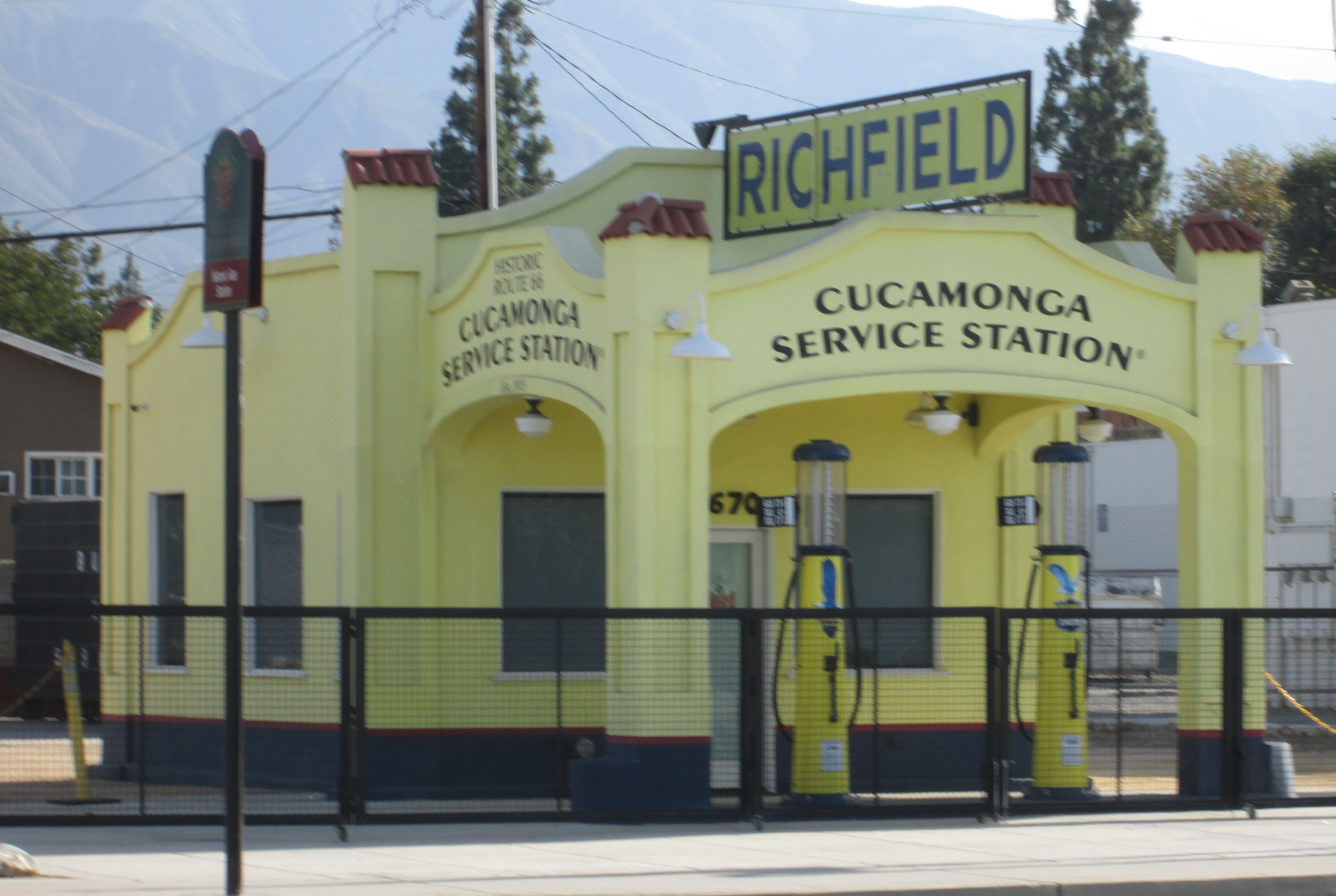
- The front of the building facing U.S. Route 66 in the foreground

- Location within California
- Location: 9670 Foothill Blvd., Rancho Cucamonga, California 91730
- Coordinates: 34°06′24.58″N 117°35′38.91″W
- Area: Inland Empire, San Bernardino County, California
- Built: 1915
- Architect: Henry Klusman
- NRHP reference No.: 100002675
- Added to NRHP: July 23, 2018

The Cucamonga Service Station is a historic gas and automobile service station located in Rancho Cucamonga, California. Local lore claims it was built in 1915 by Henry Klusman, who built many of the early buildings in Cucamonga, but there is no documented evidence for this. In 1926, the historic U.S. Route 66 was organized, and the station sits on the North side of the Route 66. The Cucamonga Service Station was originally one of thousands of similar service stations along the route. Today, it is the only surviving service station of its design on Route 66 in California. The station operated until 1971.

The original owner was William Harvey, who also operated the Cucamonga Garage and Cyclery on the lot next door. In 1914 he purchased the lot next door and built a larger garage with curb side gas pumps out front. The following year he purchased the land behind the garage from Henry Klusman. The streetside garage was then taken down and rebuilt at the back of the lot with a Spanish Colonial facade to match the new gas station built in front. After being structurally weakened by a fire, the garage collapsed in 2011 during a heavy storm.

From the 1930s through the 1960s, it was a Richfield Oil Corporation gas station, owned and operated by Ancil Morris. It ceased operations in 1971.

The Rancho Cucamonga city council voted in 2009 to make the Cucamonga Service Station a city landmark, but did not provide funds for preservation or restoration. In 2013, then-owners Lamar Advertising requested permission to demolish the building, which was denied due to its landmark status. Lamar ultimately donated the property and building to Route 66 Inland Empire California (IECA), a local historic preservation non-profit organization, with the stipulation that an easement be maintained for Lamar's billboard at the edge of the lot. The property was restored, and was reopened in 2015 as a museum. The museum receives many visitors traveling Route 66.

The restoration was provided by private donations, grants, and volunteer labor and has since won numerous awards and honors:

- 2009 - City Landmark designation.
- 2015 - Dedication Plaque from the Native Sons of the Golden West.
- 2016 - Preservation Design Award from the California Preservation Foundation.
- 2018 - Governor's Historic Preservation Award.
- 2018 - Listed on the National Register of Historic Places.
- 2019 - Best of Rancho Cucamonga - Museum.
- 2020 - Route 66 IECA named Non-Profit of the year - Rancho Cucamonga Chamber of Commerce.

Future plans include raising enough funds to rebuild the garage at the back of the lot, which will greatly expand the museum space.
