= List of historic filling stations =

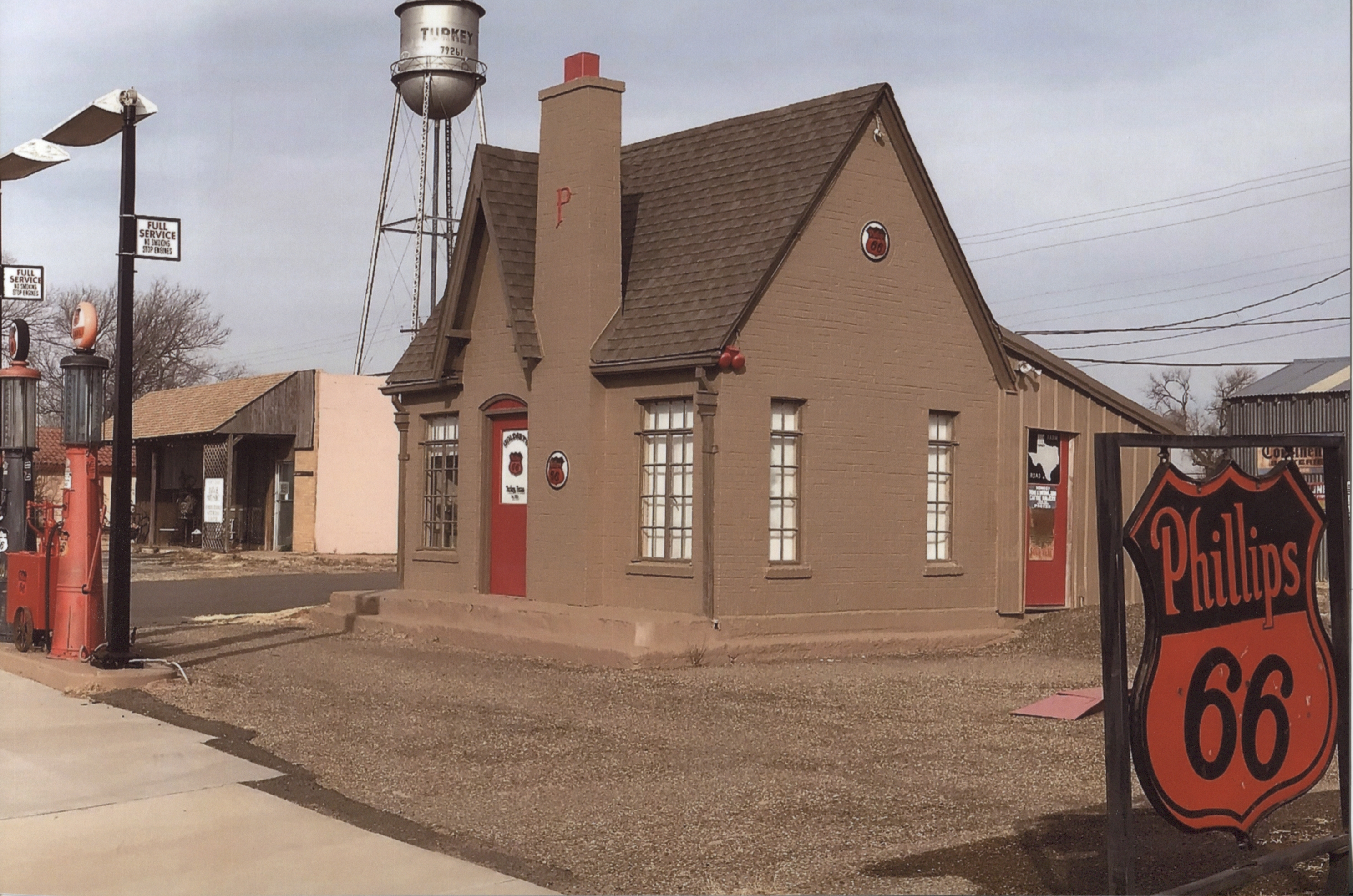
Restored 1928 Phillips 66 Service Station. The first Phillips 66 service station built in Texas opened on July 27, 1928, on the corner of 5th Street and Main in Turkey, Texas. In January 2019, this Phillips 66 service station in Turkey was recognized by the Texas Historical Commission as a Recorded Texas Historical Landmark, and a Marker Dedication Ceremony to unveil the State Historical Marker is planned to take place at the service station in April 2020.

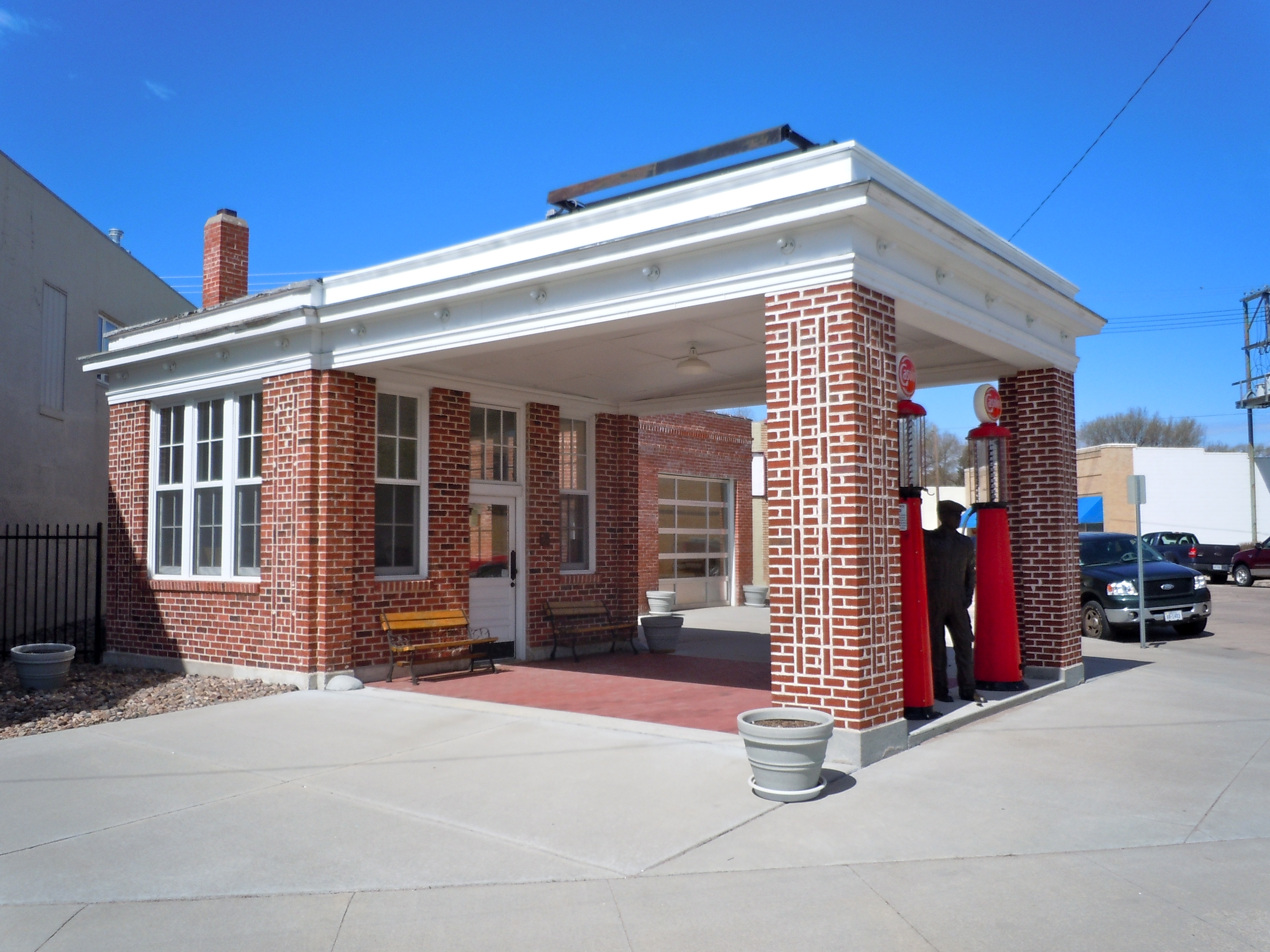
Standard Oil Red Crown Service Station, Ogallala, Nebraska

This is a list of historic filling stations and service stations, including a few tire service stations which did not have gas pumps. Many of these in the United States are listed on the National Register of Historic Places.

They are of various architectural types, including "house" types. (Note: Building types were "defined by historical geographer John Jakle in his 1975 study of gasoline stations. Jakle's article, "The American Gasoline Station, 1920 to 1970," created a typology for gasoline station identification and analysis that has been generally accepted by geographers, historians, and preservationists ever since.")

== Canada ==
- Joy Gas Stations
- Nuns' Island gas station

== Denmark ==
- Palægaragerne
- Skovshoved Petrol Station

== Eritrea ==
- Fiat Tagliero Building

== United Kingdom ==
- East Sheen Filling Station
- Markham Moor service area
- Red Hill filling station

== United States ==
=== Arizona ===
1. John Osterman Gas Station, Peach Springs
2. Cave Creek Service Station, Cave Creek
3. J.H. Smith Grocery Store and Filling Station, Dragoon
4. Copeland & Tracht Service Station, Phoenix

=== Arkansas ===
1. Harvey's Grocery and Texaco Station, in Camden, Arkansas
2. Allen Tire Company and Gas Station, Prescott
3. Texaco Station No. 1, Paragould
4. Wittsburg Store and Gas Station, Wittsburg
5. Ferguson Gas Station, Marshall
6. Jameson-Richards Gas Station, Bald Knob
7. Walter Patterson Filling Station, Clinton
8. Roundtop Filling Station, Sherwood
9. Langdon Filling Station, Hot Springs
10. Magnolia Company Filling Station, Fayetteville (NRHP-listed in 1978)
11. Magnolia Petroleum Company Filling Station, Kingsland (NRHP-listed in 2019)
12. Ellis Building, Fayetteville
13. Marathon Oil Service Station, Fordyce
14. Gulf Oil Company Service Station, Paragould
15. Henry W. Klotz, Sr., Service Station, Russell
16. Mount Ida Cities Service Filling Station, Mount Ida
17. Wallace Adams Service Station, Texarkana
18. Lee Service Station, Damascus
19. Price Produce and Service Station, Springdale
20. Rison Cities Service Station, Rison
21. Rison Texaco Service Station, Rison
22. Samuel P. Taylor Service Station, Little Rock
23. Troy Lasater Service Station, New Blaine
24. Murfreesboro Cities Service Station, Murfreesboro
25. Gulf Oil Company Filling Station, Stamps

=== California ===
1. Shell Gas Station, La Grange

=== District of Columbia ===
1. Embassy Gulf Service Station, Washington

=== Florida ===
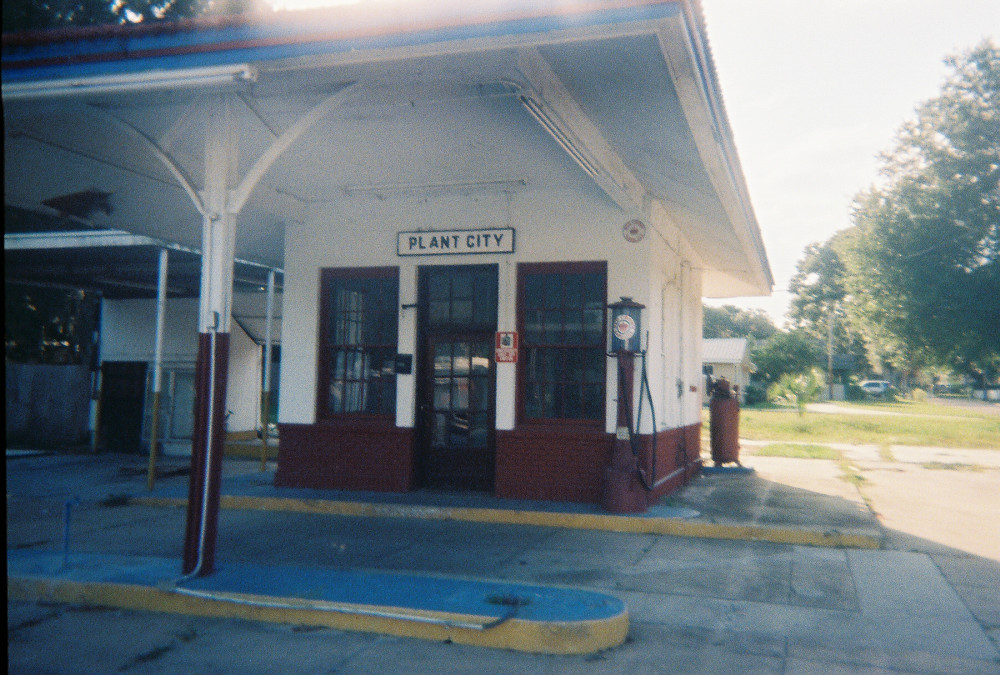
Standard Oil Service Station, Plant City, Florida

1. Atlantic Gas Station, Miami
2. St. Petersburg Standard Oil Station, St. Petersburg
3. Standard Oil Service Station, Plant City
4. Sinclair Service Station, Spring Hill

=== Georgia ===
1. Pure Oil Service Station (Hartwell, Georgia)
2. Pure Oil Service Station (Lavonia, Georgia)
3. Gulf Oil Company service station, Douglasville, in Tudor Revival, from the 1920s, in Douglasville Commercial Historic District
4. 1940 Sinclair Service Station Lavonia, GA

=== Illinois ===
1. Ambler's Texaco Gas Station, Dwight
2. Pure Oil Station, Geneva
3. Belvidere Cafe, Motel and Gas Station, Litchfield
4. Soulsby Service Station, Mount Olive
5. Standard Oil Gasoline Station (Odell, Illinois)
6. Standard Oil Gasoline Station (Plainfield, Illinois)
7. Shea's Gas Station Museum, Springfield

=== Indiana ===
1. Hy-Red Gasoline Station, Greentown
2. Firestone Tire and Rubber Store, Evansville, IN (to be verified about providing auto service or not)

=== Iowa ===
1. Bedford Oil Company Station, Bedford
2. Kreinbring Phillips 66 Gas Station, Lowden
3. Master Service Station (Waterloo, Iowa)
4. Pioneer Oil Company Filling Station, Grinnell
5. Henry and Johanna Van Maren House-Diamond Filling Station, Pella
6. Wolters Filling Station, Davenport

=== Kansas ===
1. Hughes Conoco Service Station, Topeka
2. Westside Service Station and Riverside Motel, Eureka
3. Baxter Springs Independent Oil and Gas Service Station, Baxter Springs
4. Deerfield Texaco Service Station, Deerfield
5. E. W. Norris Service Station, Glen Elder

=== Kentucky ===
1. Spur Gasoline Station, Cynthiana
2. Standard Oil Company Filling Station, Bowling Green

=== Louisiana ===
1. More Mileage Gas Station, Jennings

=== Massachusetts ===
1. Colonial Beacon Gas Station, Stoneham
2. A. C. Smith & Co. Gas Station, Quincy

=== Michigan ===
1. Tuomy Hills Service Station, Ann Arbor

=== Minnesota ===
1. Lindholm Oil Company Service Station, Cloquet
2. Lundring Service Station, Canby
3. New Ulm Oil Company Service Station, New Ulm

=== Missouri ===
1. Gardner and Tinsley Filling Station, New Cambria
2. Royal Tire Service Inc. Building, St. Louis, MO (to be verified about providing auto service or not)

=== Montana ===
1. Dave's Texaco, Chinook, Montana
2. Continental Oil Company Filling Station, Kalispell
3. Hale's Filling Station and Grocery, Bainville
4. H. Earl Clack Service Station, Saco

=== Nebraska ===
1. Gloe Brothers Service Station, Wood River
2. Standard Oil Red Crown Service Station, Ogallala
3. Weyl Service Station, Trenton
4. Shady Bend Gas Station, Grocery, and Diner, Grand Island
5. Warner's Filling Station and House, Geneva

=== New Mexico ===
1. Roy T. Herman's Garage and Service Station, Thoreau
2. Huning Highlands Conoco Service Station, Albuquerque
3. Otero's 66 Service, Los Lunas
4. Charley's Automotive Service, Grants
5. Grants-Milan Flight Service Station, Grants
6. Midway Service Station, Kenna

=== New York ===
1. Pure Oil Gas Station, Saratoga Springs
2. Liebler-Rohl Gasoline Station, Lancaster

=== North Carolina ===
1. Shell Service Station (Winston-Salem, North Carolina)
2. Beam's Shell Service Station and Office, (Former), Cherryville

=== North Dakota ===
1. Westland Oil Filling Station, Minot

=== Oklahoma ===
1. Foyil Filling Station, Foyil, in Rogers County
2. Marland Filling Station, Hominy
3. McDougal Filling Station, Vinita
4. Seaba's Filling Station, Chandler
5. Threatt Filling Station, Luther
6. Narcissa D-X Gas Station, Miami
7. Avant's Cities Service Station, El Reno
8. Bridgeport Hill Service Station, Geary
9. Bristow Firestone Service Station, Bristow
10. Canute Service Station, Canute
11. Cities Service Station, Afton
12. Cities Service Station No. 8, Tulsa
13. Jackson Conoco Service Station, El Reno
14. Magnolia Service Station, Texola
15. Miami Marathon Oil Company Service Station, Miami
16. Provine Service Station, Hydro
17. Sayre Champlin Service Station, Sayre
18. Sinclair Service Station (Tulsa, Oklahoma)
19. Spraker Service Station, Vinita
20. Texaco Service Station (Bristow, Oklahoma)
21. Y Service Station and Cafe, Clinton
22. Bristow Tire Shop, Bristow, OK, which is a former service station that did have gas pumps
23. Randall Tire Company, Vinita, OK

=== Oregon ===
1. St. Johns Signal Tower Gas Station, Portland
2. Peck Bros. and Bartle Tire Service Company Building, Portland, Oregon, which serviced automobiles but does not appear to have had gas pumps
3. Jim's Signal Station (1924), Malin

=== Pennsylvania ===
1. Lee Tire and Rubber Company, Conshohocken, PA (to be verified about providing auto service or not)

=== Rhode Island ===
- Art's Auto (1927), Pawtucket

=== South Carolina ===
- ESSO Club, Clemson

=== South Dakota ===
1. Spearfish Filling Station, Spearfish

=== Tennessee ===
1. Spring Street Service Station, McMinnville
2. Airplane Service Station, Knoxville
3. Ellis Service Station Garage, Nashville

=== Texas ===
1. Old Sinclair Station, Bryan
2. Schauer Filling Station, Houston
3. Jenkins-Harvey Super Service Station and Garage, Tyler
4. Texas Company Filling Station, Victoria
5. 1924 Magnolia Service Station, Vega
6. 1928 Phillips 66 Service Station, Turkey
7. 1929 Phillips 66 Service Station, McLean

=== Utah ===
1. Utah Parks Company Service Station, Bryce Canyon
2. River Heights Sinclair Station, River Heights

=== Vermont ===
1. Gas Station at Bridge and Island Streets, Rockingham

=== Virginia ===
1. 1(Gas Station (Green Gables) on Hwy#16 between Volney & Troutdale, Grayson Co., VA

=== Washington ===
1. Central Service Station, Rosalia
2. Teapot Dome Service Station, Zillah

=== West Virginia ===
- Weaver's Antique Service Station, Burlington

=== Wisconsin ===
1. Trapp Filling Station, Hartland
2. Oatman Filling Station, Eau Claire
3. Freitag's Pure Oil Service Station, Monroe
4. Wadhams Gas Station, West Allis

== See also ==
- Filling station
- List of filling station chains in North America
