= Pure Oil Service Station =

Pure Oil Service Station may refer to:

- Pure Oil Service Station (Marshall, Arkansas)
- Pure Oil Service Station (Hartwell, Georgia)
- Pure Oil Service Station (Lavonia, Georgia)
- Pure Oil Service Station (Geneva, Illinois)
- Pure Oil Service Station (Mooresville, Indiana); part of the Mooresville Commercial Historic District in Mooresville, Indiana
- Pure Oil Service Station (Fairport, New York)
- Pure Oil Service Station (Saratoga Springs, New York)
- Pure Oil Service Station (Black Mountain, North Carolina); part of the Black Mountain Downtown Historic District
- Pure Oil Service Station (West Asheville, North Carolina); part of the West Asheville End of Car Line Historic District
- Pure Oil Service Station (Wilmington, North Carolina); part of the Westbrook–Ardmore Historic District
- Pure Oil Service Station (Winston-Salem, North Carolina); part of the Winston-Salem Downtown North Historic District
- Pure Oil Service Station (Montgomery, Ohio)
- Pure Oil Service Station (Peninsula, Ohio)
- Pure Oil Service Station (McMinnville, Tennessee)
- Pure Oil Service Station (Clifton Forge, Virginia); part of the Clifton Forge Commercial Historic District
- Pure Oil Service Station (Manning, South Carolina); part of the Manning Commercial Historic District
- Freitag's Pure Oil Service Station, Monroe, Wisconsin

== See also ==
- Pure Oil Building, in Chicago
