= Gulf Oil Company Filling Station =

Gulf Oil Company Filling Station or similar may refer to:

- Gulf Oil Company Filling Station (Stamps, Arkansas)
- Gulf Oil Company Service Station (Paragould, Arkansas)
