= Jakle =

Jakle or Jäkle is a surname. Notable people with the surname include:

- Hansjörg Jäkle (born 1971), German ski jumper
- John A. Jakle (born 1939), American geographer
- Kelley Jakle (born 1989), American actress and singer-songwriter
