= Ellis Service Station Garage =

- U.S. National Register of Historic Places
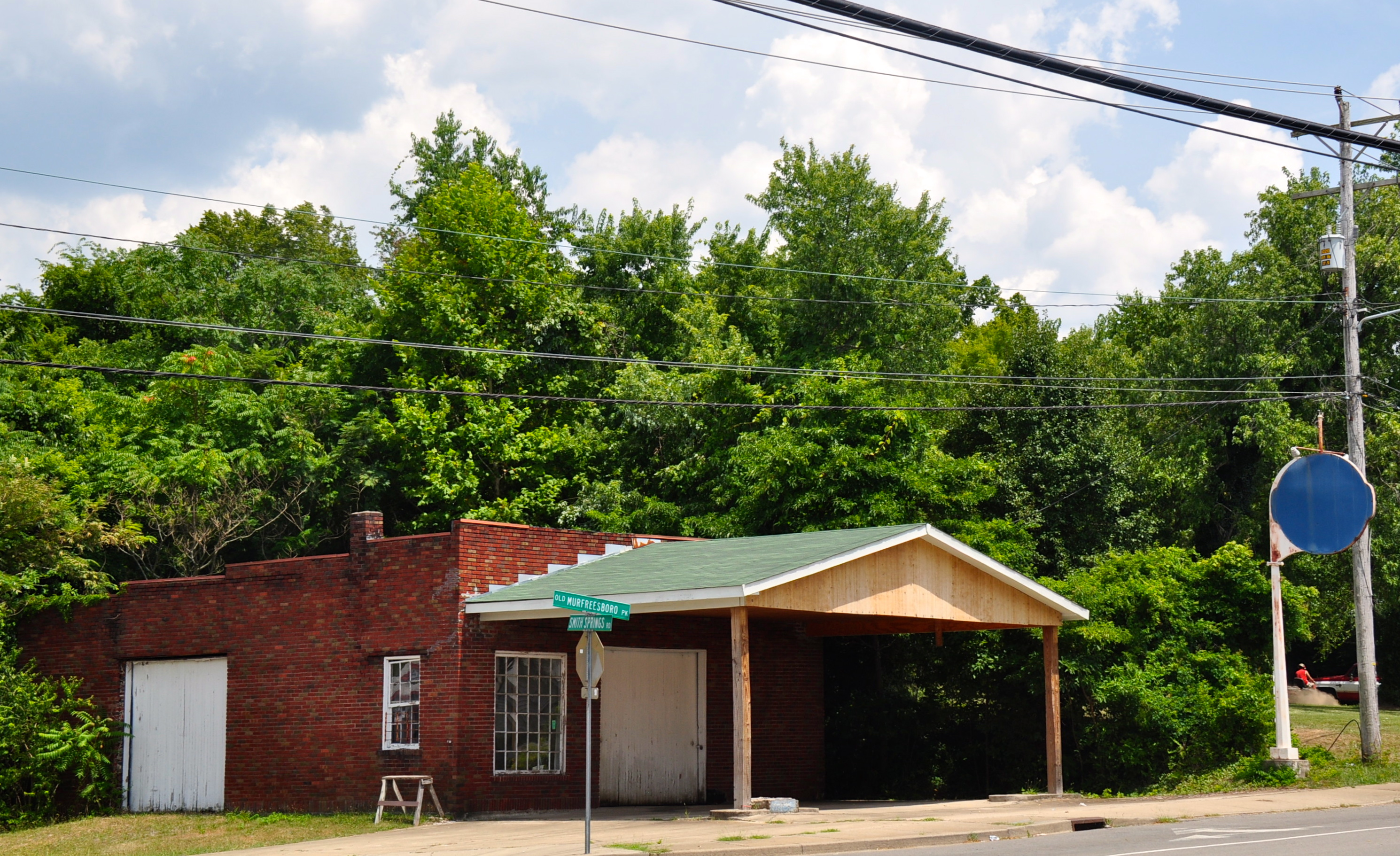
- Location: 2000 Old Murfreesboro Rd., Nashville, Tennessee
- Coordinates: 36°05′50″N 86°39′13″W
- Area: 0.5 acres (0.20 ha)
- Built: 1929
- Built by: Creech, Luther
- NRHP reference No.: 91000436
- Added to NRHP: April 15, 1991

The Ellis Service Station Garage, or Ellis Garage, at 2000 Old Murfreesboro Rd. in Nashville, Tennessee, was built in 1929. It was listed on the National Register of Historic Places in 1991.

== Location ==
It was located in the community of Una which used to be about seven miles away from the city limits of Nashville, but has been absorbed into the growing city.

== Description ==
It is a one-story 35 by 40 feet (11 m × 12 m) building which is significant architecturally as "a vernacular adaption of a gas station form known as the 'house with bays,' a building type defined by historical geographer John Jakle in his 1975 study of gasoline stations. Jakle's article, "The American Gasoline Station, 1920 to 1970," created a typology for gasoline station identification and analysis that has been generally accepted by geographers, historians, and preservationists ever since."
