= Douglasville Commercial Historic District =

Historic district in Georgia, United States

- U.S. National Register of Historic Places
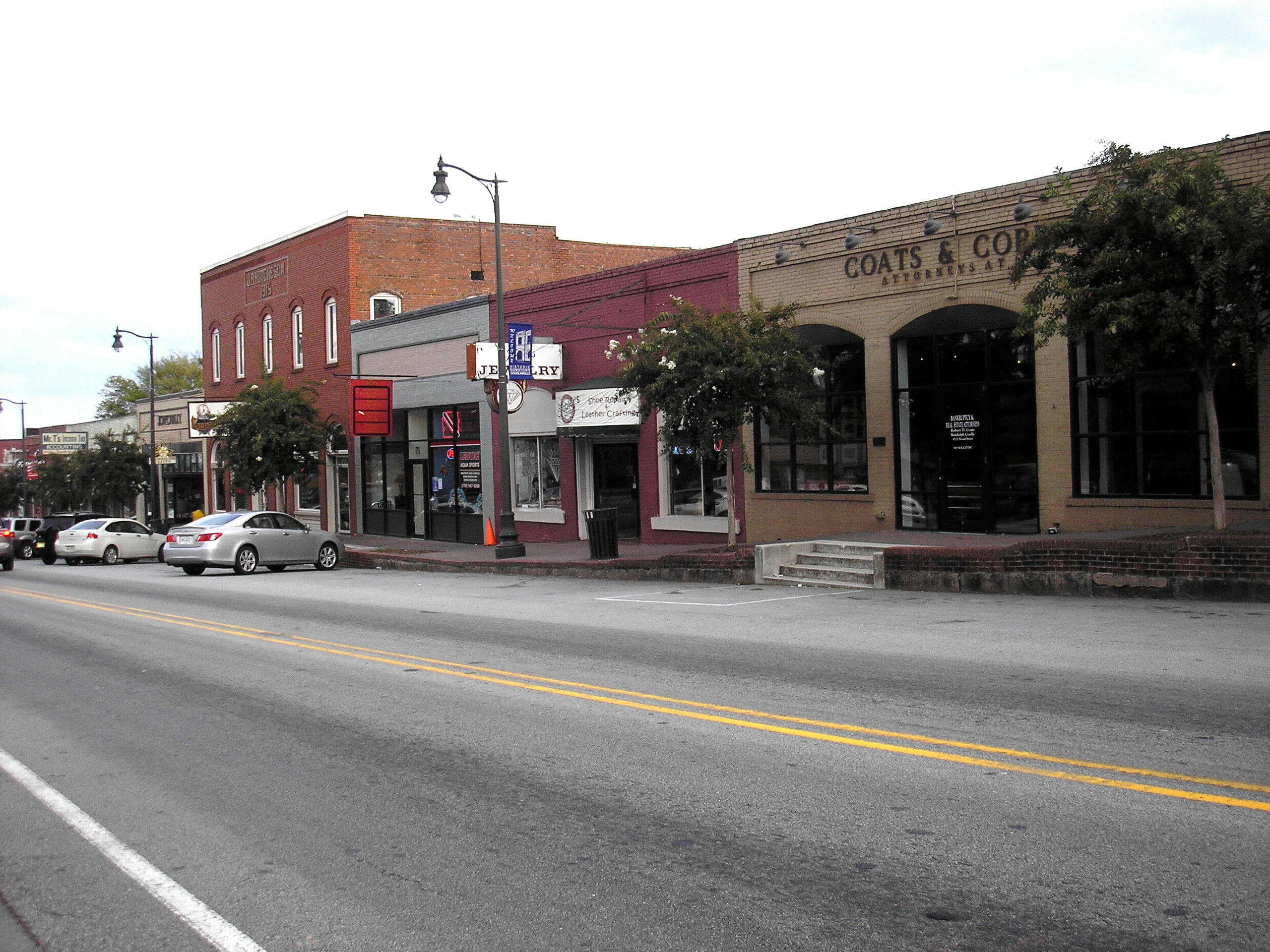

- Location within Georgia
- Location: Roughly bounded by Broad St., Adair St., Church St., and Club Dr., Douglasville, Georgia
- Coordinates: 33°45′03″N 84°44′56″W
- Area: 14 acres (5.7 ha)
- Built: 1874
- Architectural style: Late 19th and Early 20th Century American Movements, Late 19th and 20th Century Revivals, Italianate
- NRHP reference No.: 89000850
- Added to NRHP: July 24, 1989

The Douglasville Commercial Historic District in Douglasville, Georgia is a historic district which was listed on the National Register of Historic Places in 1989.

The listed area is 14 acres (5.7 ha), and consisted of four-and-a-half blocks of buildings along the south side of Broad St. facing north towards the railroad, between Adair St. and Club Drive, plus some buildings on the back sides of those blocks facing south onto Church St., plus some on the cross streets in between these blocks. In 1989 the area included 35 contributing buildings, a contributing structure, a contributing site, and a contributing object. Broad St. is now also known as Veterans Memorial Highway and as U.S. Route 78.

It comprises the historic commercial area of Douglasville. It includes the modern Douglas County Courthouse and the historic courthouse square with historic landscaping, a 1914 Civil War monument, and a World War II monument. The courthouse square is the oldest resource. The district includes the historic railroad right-of-way across Broad Street through this downtown district. The oldest buildings were built in the 1880s.

Selected buildings include:

- Douglasville Banking Company, in Beaux Arts style
- the former Gulf Oil Company service station, in Tudor Revival, from 1920s
- Palace Barber Shop, from c.1890s
- Masonic Lodge (c.1924) (see photo #13), at northeast corner of Church & Price Sts.
- Farmers & Merchants Bank (c.1912)

The district was deemed significant as a typical Georgia railroad town's downtown commercial area.
