= Price Produce and Service Station =

- U.S. National Register of Historic Places
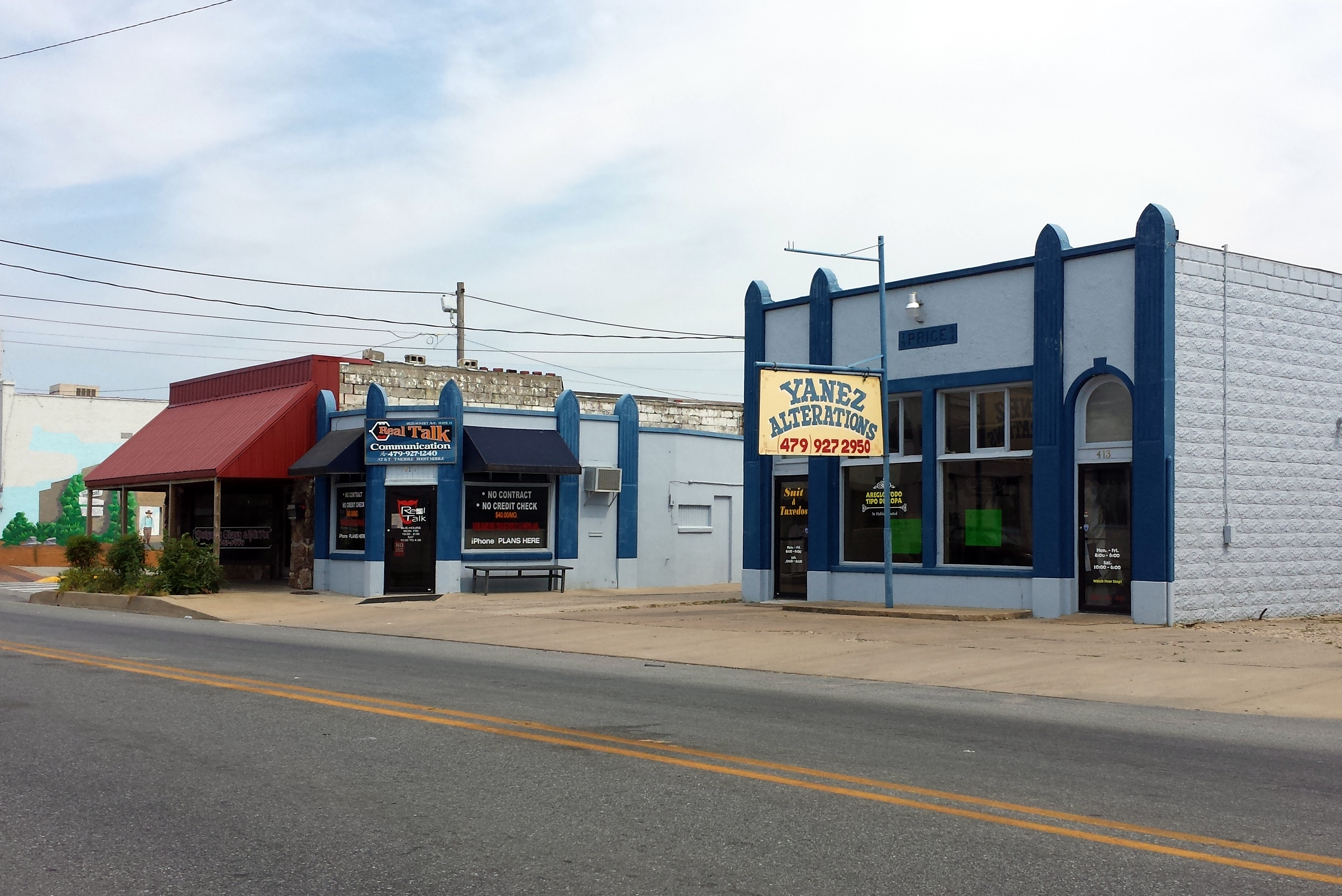

- Location within Arkansas Location within the United States
- Location: 413, 415 & 417 E. Emma Ave., Springdale, Arkansas
- Coordinates: 36°11′5″N 94°7′35″W
- Area: less than one acre
- Built: 1934
- NRHP reference No.: 11000694
- Added to NRHP: September 23, 2011

The Price Produce and Service Station is a collection of three related commercial buildings at 413, 415, and 417 East Emma Avenue in Springdale, Arkansas. It includes one building that hosted an automotive filling station and produce shop, a second that traditionally housed a barbershop, and a third structure, originally open but now enclosed and housing a residence, that was used as an automobile service area. The buildings were all built in 1934, and are united by common Art Deco styling, most prominently lancet-topped pilasters that rise above the height of their roofs. The complex is regarded as a fine local example of vernacular Art Deco, and as a surviving element of the automotive culture of the 1930s.

The buildings were listed on the National Register of Historic Places in 2011.

== See also ==
- National Register of Historic Places listings in Washington County, Arkansas
