= Bedford Oil Company Station =

Building in Iowa, U.S.

- U.S. National Register of Historic Places
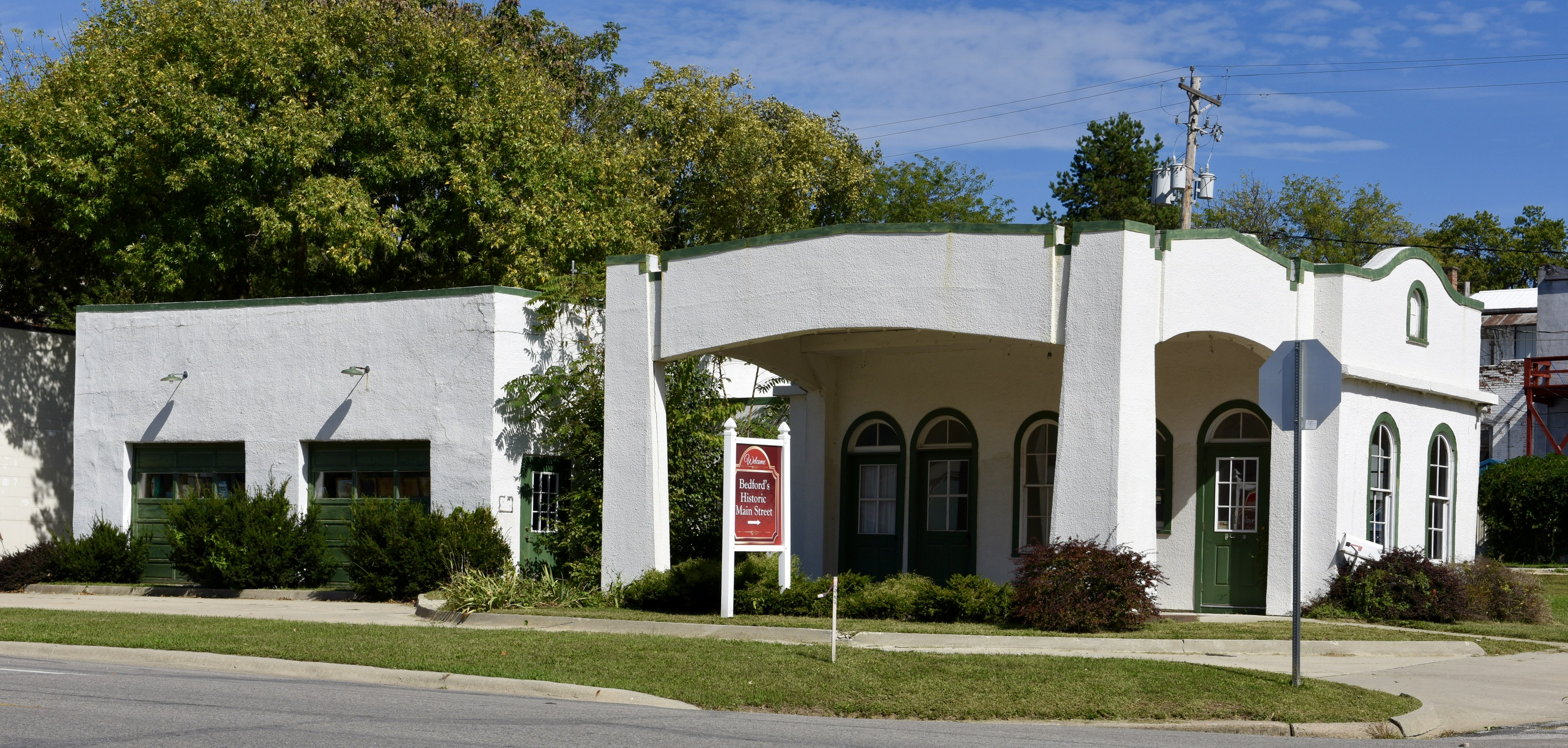

- Location within Iowa Location within the United States
- Location: 601 Madison St. Bedford, Iowa
- Coordinates: 40°40′02″N 94°43′15″W
- Area: less than one acre
- Built: 1928
- Built by: R.F. Greenlee
- Architectural style: Mission/Spanish Colonial Revival
- NRHP reference No.: 99000831
- Added to NRHP: July 15, 1999

Bedford Oil Company Station, also known as the Conoco Station Building, is a historic building located in Bedford, Iowa, United States. Partners Wyatt Blakemore and Ralph Thompson had the station built in 1928 on land they had purchased three years prior. The single-story Mission Revival structure was built from April to June by Roy Greenlee, a local contractor. It was the third of three service stations that Blakemore and Thompson built and operated. The garage section of the building was added in 1929. When it closed in 1989 it was the longest operating station in town. The building was listed on the National Register of Historic Places in 1999.
