= Shea's Gas Station Museum =

Former Route 66 landmark in Illinois (closed 2015)

Coordinates: 39°49′50.4″N 89°38′14.0″W

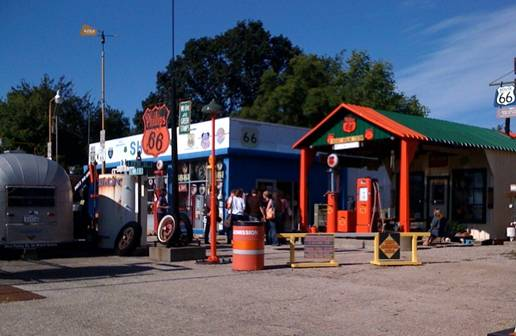
- Location: 1168 Sangamon Avenue; Springfield, Illinois; United States
- Public transit access: SMTD

Shea's Gas Station Museum Center piece The Mahan Filling Station located on Route 66 in Springfield, Illinois was transformed from a working Texaco, and later Marathon, station into a museum by owner Bill Shea and his wife Helen. The museum contained an eclectic mix of vintage gas station memorabilia collected over the last fifty years including the original gas pumps, wooden phone booths, signs, photos, and other mementos reminiscent of old Route 66 service stations. In February 2000, the former Mahan's Station, rumored to be the oldest filling station in Illinois, was moved 21 miles to its current location at Fulgenzi's. It has since been fully restored. The museum's guestbook boasts visitors from all over Europe and Asia and has become a destination for international travelers exploring the Mother Road. Due to his commitment to preserving Route 66 history and gas station memorabilia, plus his many years of quality service to his customers, Bill Shea and his shop were inducted into the Route 66 Hall of Fame in 1993. The entire Shea family was inducted in 2002. Bill Shea died in December 2013 and the gas station was sold. The museum contents were auctioned in 2015. As of 2015, the old Filling Station building was in use as the Fulgenzi's Pizza & Pasta.

== See also ==
- U.S. Route 66 in Illinois
