= Gulf Oil Company Filling Station (Stamps, Arkansas) =

- U.S. National Register of Historic Places
- Location within Arkansas Location within the United States
- Location: 131 Main St., Stamps, Arkansas
- Coordinates: 33°21′48″N 93°30′3″W
- Area: less than one acre
- Built: c. 1930
- NRHP reference No.: 100003331
- Added to NRHP: January 24, 2019

The Gulf Oil Company Filling Station is a historic automotive service station building at 131 Main Street in Stamps, Arkansas. It is a single-story brick building, with a portico, supported by brick piers, extending over the area where the fuel pumps were originally located. The portico extends from the portion of the building housing what originally served as the station office, with two automotive service bays to its right. The station was built about 1930, to a corporate design introduced by Gulf Oil in the 1910s, and is painted in that company's colors: white, blue, and orange.

The building was listed on the National Register of Historic Places in 2019.

== See also ==
- List of historic filling stations in Arkansas
- National Register of Historic Places listings in Lafayette County, Arkansas
