= Spur Gasoline Station =

- U.S. National Register of Historic Places
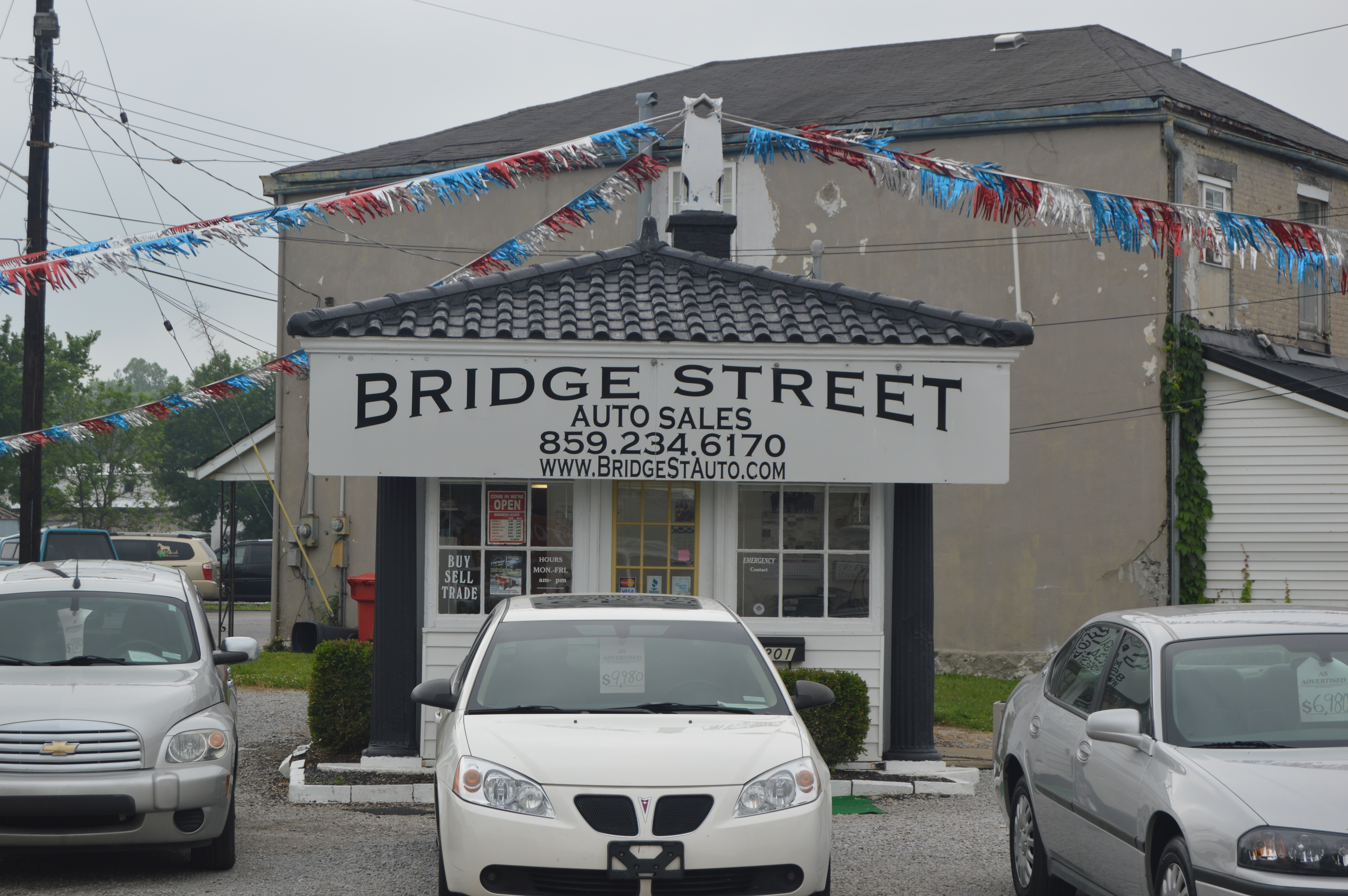

- Location within Kentucky Location within the United States
- Location: 201 E. Bridge St., Cynthiana, Kentucky
- Coordinates: 38°23′15″N 84°17′46″W
- Area: less than one acre
- Built: 1925
- Architectural style: Classical Revival
- NRHP reference No.: 87000647
- Added to NRHP: April 27, 1987

Spur Gasoline Station, at 201 E. Bridge St. in Cynthiana, Kentucky, was built in 1925. It was listed on the National Register of Historic Places in 1987.

It is a one-story 13 by 13 feet (4.0 m × 4.0 m) prefabricated building, 8 feet (2.4 m) high to its eaves, with elements of Classical Revival style.
