= East Sheen Filling Station =

Coordinates: 51°27′51″N 0°16′41″W

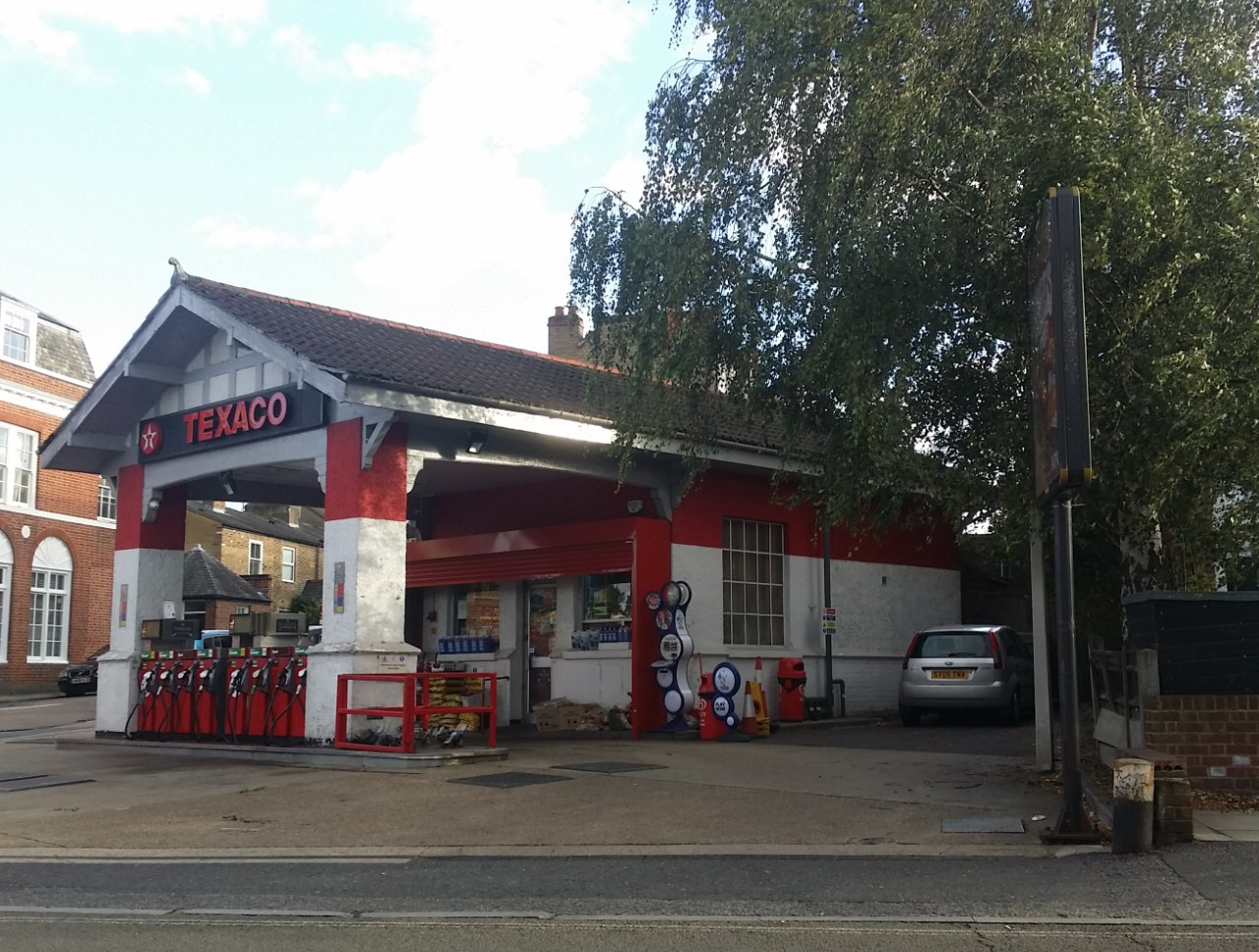

- Location within London Borough of Richmond upon Thames

General information
- Type: Petrol service station
- Location: 567 Upper Richmond Road, East Sheen, London SW14

Listed Building – Grade II
- Official name: East Sheen Filling Station
- Designated: 11 May 2012
- Reference no.: 1406667

East Sheen Filling Station is a petrol service station at 567 Upper Richmond Road, East Sheen, London SW14 in the London Borough of Richmond upon Thames. It dates from about 1926. In 2012 Historic England designated it as a Grade II listed building, citing it as "one of the earliest surviving examples of a purpose-built filling station" and "a pioneering UK instance of an 'American-style' filling station, with canopy and office under a single roof".
