= Royal Tire Service Inc. Building =

- U.S. National Register of Historic Places
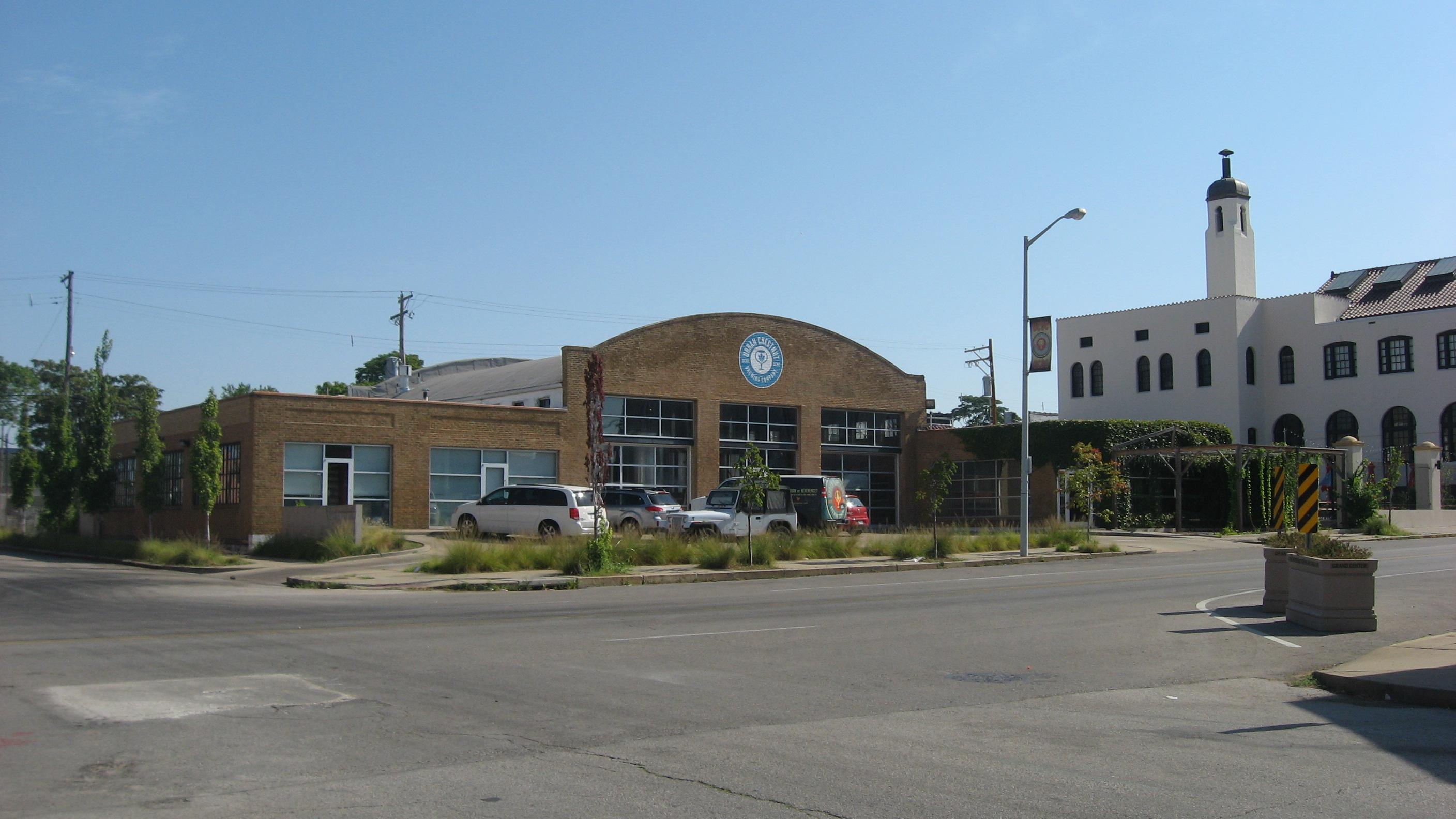

- Location within Missouri
- Location: 3229 Washington Ave., St. Louis, Missouri
- Coordinates: 38°38′17″N 90°13′33″W
- Area: less than one acre
- Built: 1929
- Built by: Charles B. McCormack (contractor)
- Architect: Tom P. Barnett
- Architectural style: Modern Movement
- MPS: Auto-Related Resources of St. Louis, Missouri MPS
- NRHP reference No.: 07000616
- Added to NRHP: June 22, 2007

The Royal Tire Service Inc. Building, at 3229 Washington Ave. in St. Louis, Missouri, was built in 1929. It was listed on the National Register of Historic Places in 2007.

It has also been known as U.S. Tire Service, as Beverly Tire Company, and as Mo Cummins Diesel Sales Corp.

It was built for original use as a tire shop and gas station. It "is a spacious one story, L-shaped brick service garage with a barrel-vaulted roof above a central section that features an arched parapet. Five pass-through garage bays (with original overhead doors on the north (rear) elevation) are situated within the long (northern) leg of the L. A small office is located on the shorter east leg of the L, featuring a truncated southwest comer. Gasoline pumps have been removed, but the building itself and the way it frames its corner lot clearly illustrate the property's use as an automobile-related resource. Additionally, an abundance of historic material remains."
