= Foyil Filling Station =

- U.S. National Register of Historic Places
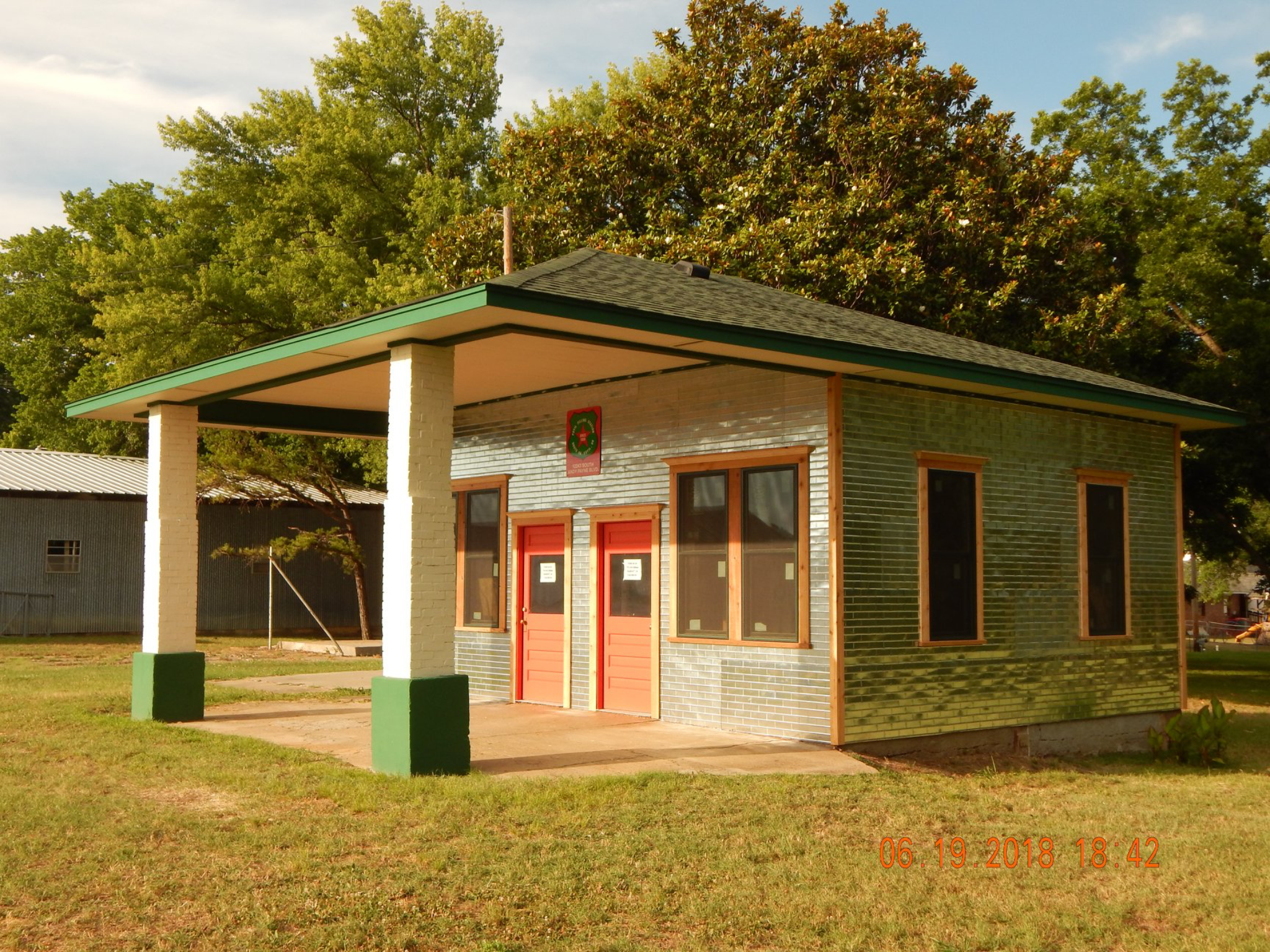

- Location within Oklahoma
- Location: 12243 S. Andy Payne Blvd., Foyil, Oklahoma
- Coordinates: 36°26′03″N 95°31′12″W
- Area: less than one acre
- Built: 1925
- MPS: Route 66 in Oklahoma MPS
- NRHP reference No.: 15000875
- Added to NRHP: December 8, 2015

The Foyil Filling Station, in Foyil, Oklahoma, was listed on the National Register of Historic Places in 2015. It is located on the original alignment of U.S. Route 66.

== History ==
In April 1923 Thomas B. Millard bought lot 12 of block 12 in Foyil, Oklahoma where he would build the Foyil Filling Station before selling the property to his brother William J. Millard and moving to Texas in October 1926. William J. Millard sold the property to George W. Vincent and his wife Violet in October 1931. Mr. and Mrs. Vincent sold the property to Joseph Floyd Shaffer in June 1937 but he had already been operating the station as early as 1932. Floyd Shaffer, who was the brother-in-law to both Tom and William Millard and the cousin of George Vincent ran the station for the next 33 years until it ceased operating in the mid-1960s.

Floyd was a World War One combat veteran serving with the 90th Division Machine Gun Company, 358th U.S. Infantry. He was involved in several major battles after being sent to France and had war memorabilia prominently displayed on the walls of the station. He successfully ran the station at a time when Foyil had five other filling stations operating simultaneously. The other stations eventually closed their doors and were demolished leaving only the Foyil Filling Station standing. However, it too closed after hanging on for several years after Route 66 was relocated a short distance to the west, in 1962. The station began and ended as a Texaco Filling Station making it one of the oldest Texaco stations still standing on Route 66.

Foyil native Andrew Hartley Payne ran past the Filling Station on his way to winning the Great Transcontinental Footrace of 1928. Singer/Actor Gene Autry was well acquainted with it from rooming at a boarding house across the street while working as a relief telegraph operator for the Frisco Railroad. Additionally, Ed Galloway's Totem Pole Park which has been a popular Route 66 attraction for many years is located only a few miles away on State Highway 28A.
