= Lundring Service Station =

- U.S. National Register of Historic Places
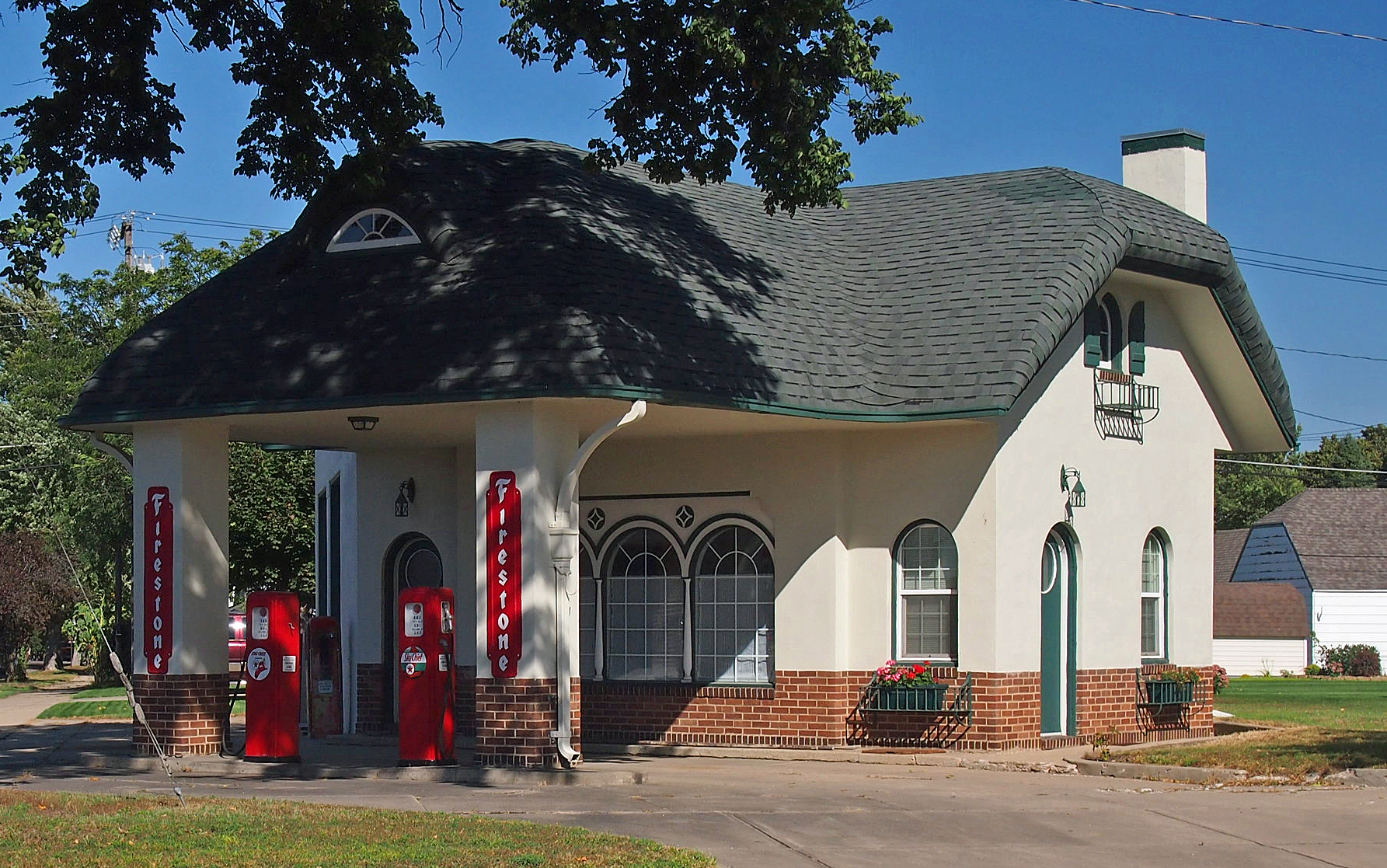
- The Lundring Service Station from the southwest

- Location within Minnesota Location within the United States
- Location: 201 1st Street E, Canby, Minnesota
- Coordinates: 44°42′28.2″N 96°16′29.7″W
- Area: .083 acres (0.034 ha)
- Built: 1926
- Architect: Dipple of Chicago
- Architectural style: English Cottage Revival
- NRHP reference No.: 86001356
- Designated: June 20, 1986

The Lundring Service Station is a historic former gas station in Canby, Minnesota, United States. It was built in 1926 in the style of an English cottage. The service station was listed on the National Register of Historic Places in 1986 for having local significance in the theme of architecture. It was nominated for being a good example of the small, period revival gas stations built in the United States in the 1920s and 30s, and a distinctive use of English Cottage Revival architecture.

== See also ==
- National Register of Historic Places listings in Yellow Medicine County, Minnesota
