= J.H. Smith Grocery Store and Filling Station =

United States historic place in Cochise County, Arizona

- Smith, J.H., Grocery Store and Filling Station
- U.S. National Register of Historic Places
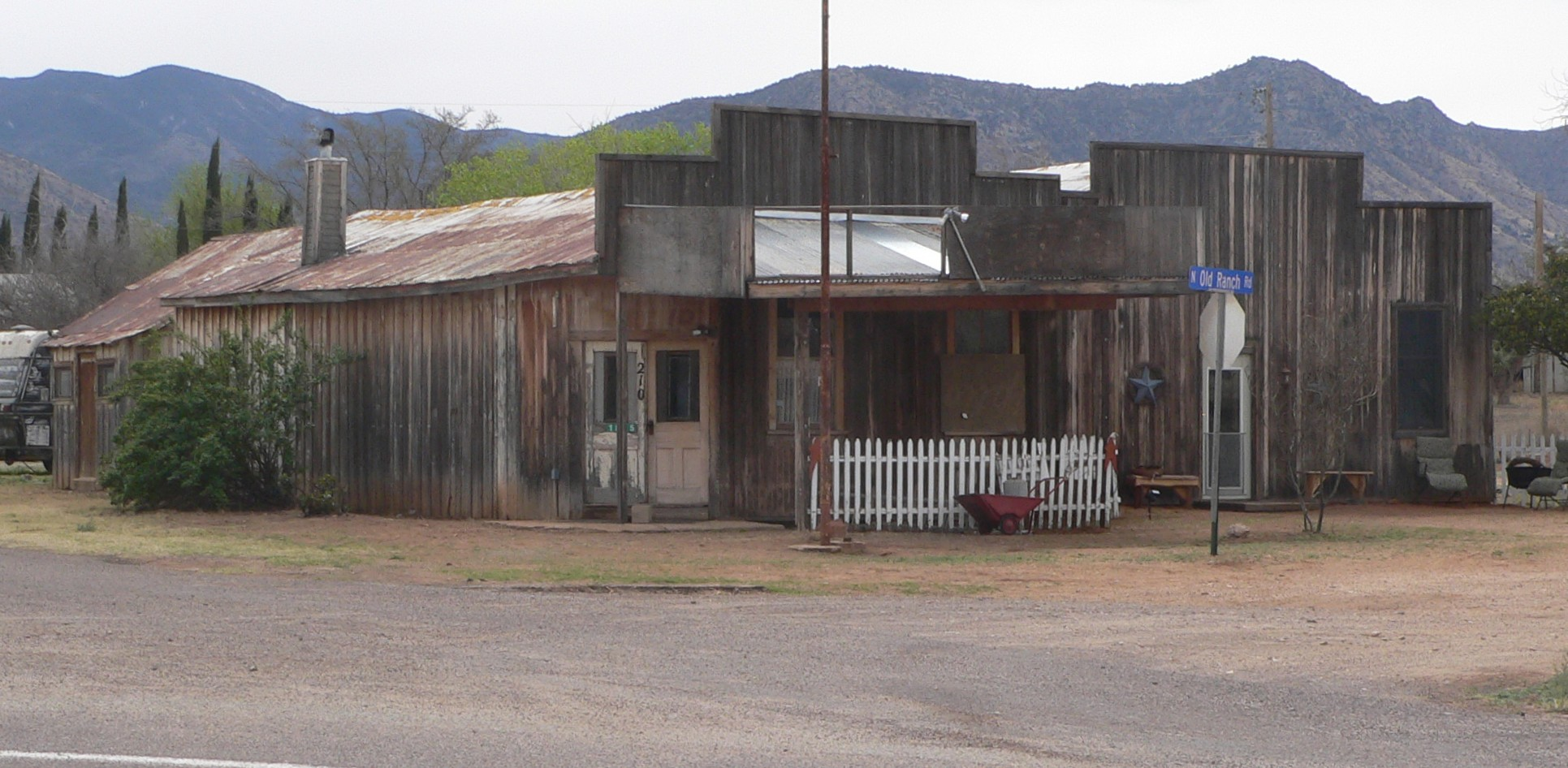
- Location: 1835 Old Ranch Rd., Dragoon, Arizona
- Coordinates: 32°01′39″N 110°02′16″W
- Area: less than one acre
- Built: 1915
- Built by: Smith, J.H.
- NRHP reference No.: 04000720
- Added to NRHP: July 21, 2004

J.H. Smith Grocery Store and Filling Station, at 1835 Old Ranch Rd. in Dragoon, Arizona, was built in 1915. It was listed on the National Register of Historic Places in 2004.

It has also been known as 210 Main Street and is located at a three-way intersection.

It is a one-story building built in 1915 by J.H. Smith from materials ordered and shipped by Southern Pacific Railroad to the local station 300 feet (91 m) away. It had two c.1920 "bubble pumps" to dispense gas, which originally was delivered by horse and wagon, then later by railway to its above-ground tanks. The pumps and tanks have since been removed.
