= Otero's 66 Service =

- U.S. National Register of Historic Places
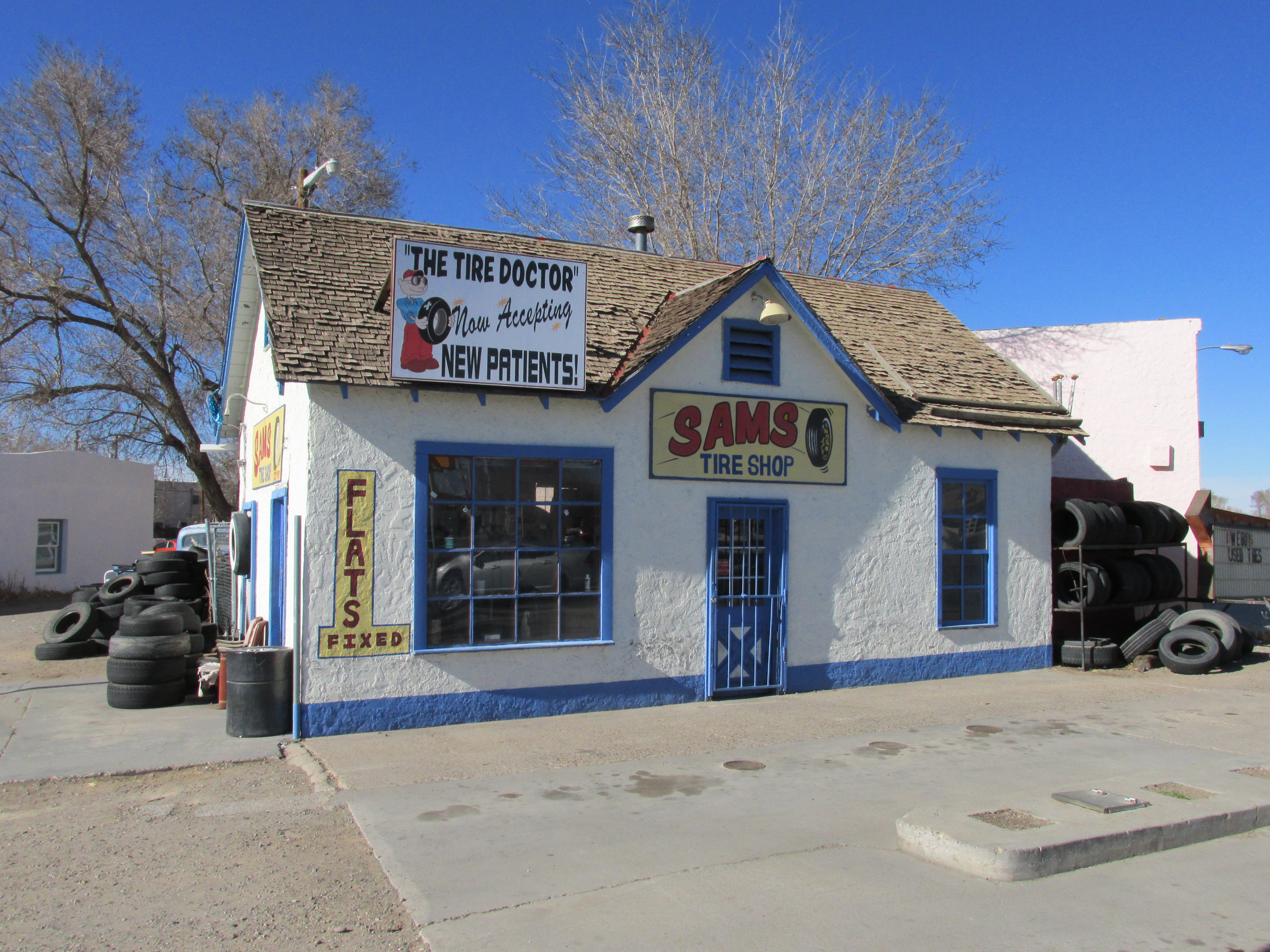

- Location within New Mexico
- Location: 100 Main St., Los Lunas, New Mexico
- Coordinates: 34.807806°N 106.736028°W
- Area: less than one acre
- Built: 1923
- MPS: Route 66 through New Mexico MPS
- NRHP reference No.: 03000051
- Added to NRHP: February 13, 2003

Otero's 66 Service, at 100 Main St. in Los Lunas, New Mexico, was constructed in 1923. It was listed on the National Register of Historic Places in 2003.

Located on historic United States Route 66, it is a former Phillips Service Station and has been operated as Sam's Tire and Lube.
