= Central Service Station =

- U.S. National Register of Historic Places
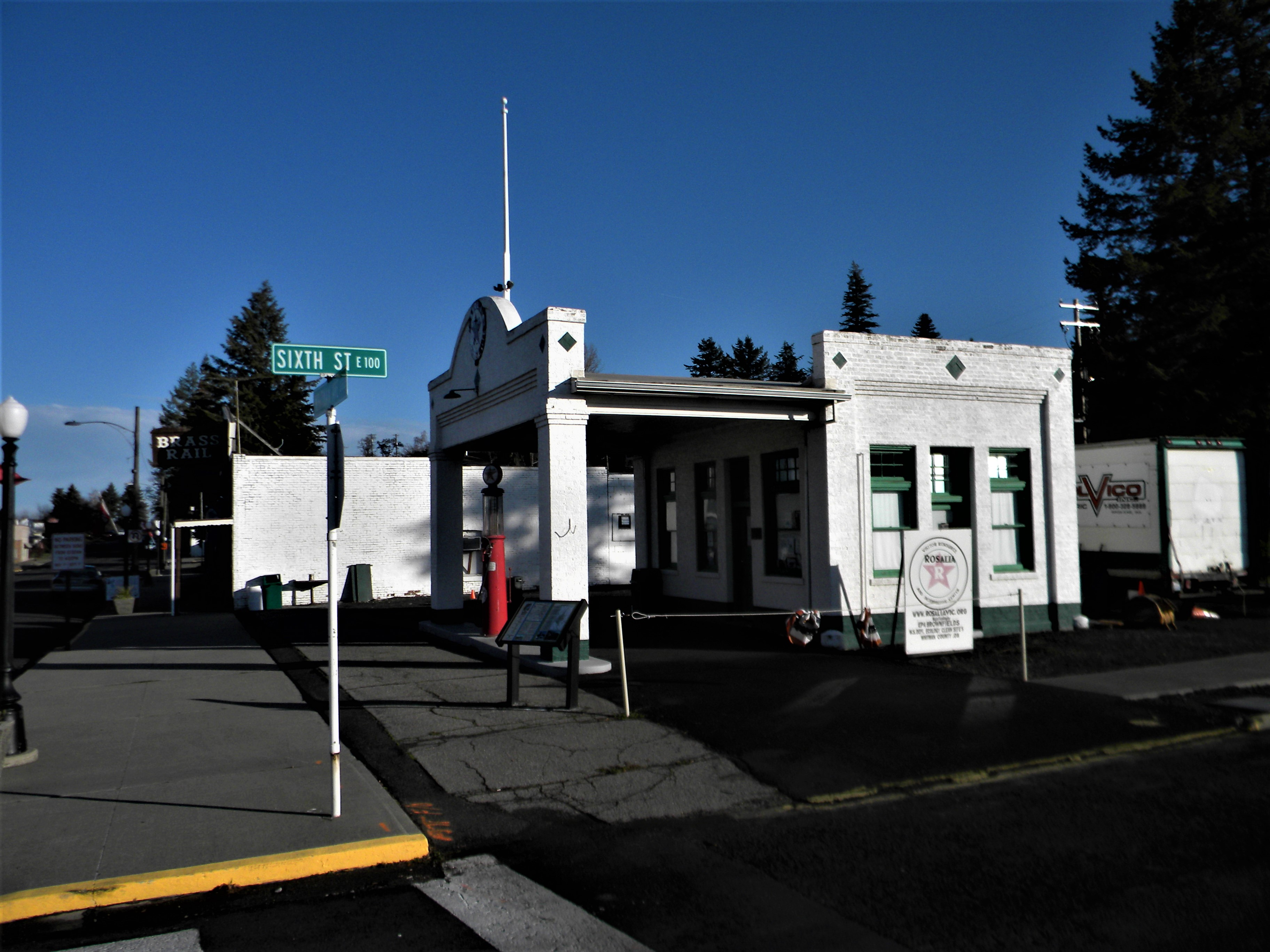

- Location within Washington (state)
- Location: 534 Whitman St., Rosalia, Washington
- Coordinates: 47°14′10″N 117°22′07″W
- Area: less than one acre
- Built: 1923
- Architectural style: Early Commercial
- NRHP reference No.: 07000365
- Added to NRHP: April 24, 2007

The Central Service Station at 534 Whitman St. in Rosalia, Washington was built in 1923. It was listed on the National Register of Historic Places in 2007.

It is a 25 by 16 feet (7.6 m × 4.9 m) brick commercial building, with brick laid in common bond, on a poured concrete foundation. It was deemed notable as an "intact example of an early Texaco gas station in eastern Washington. The building embodies the distinctive characteristics of its type (House with a Canopy), and period of construction."
