= Shady Bend Gas Station, Grocery, and Diner =

- U.S. National Register of Historic Places
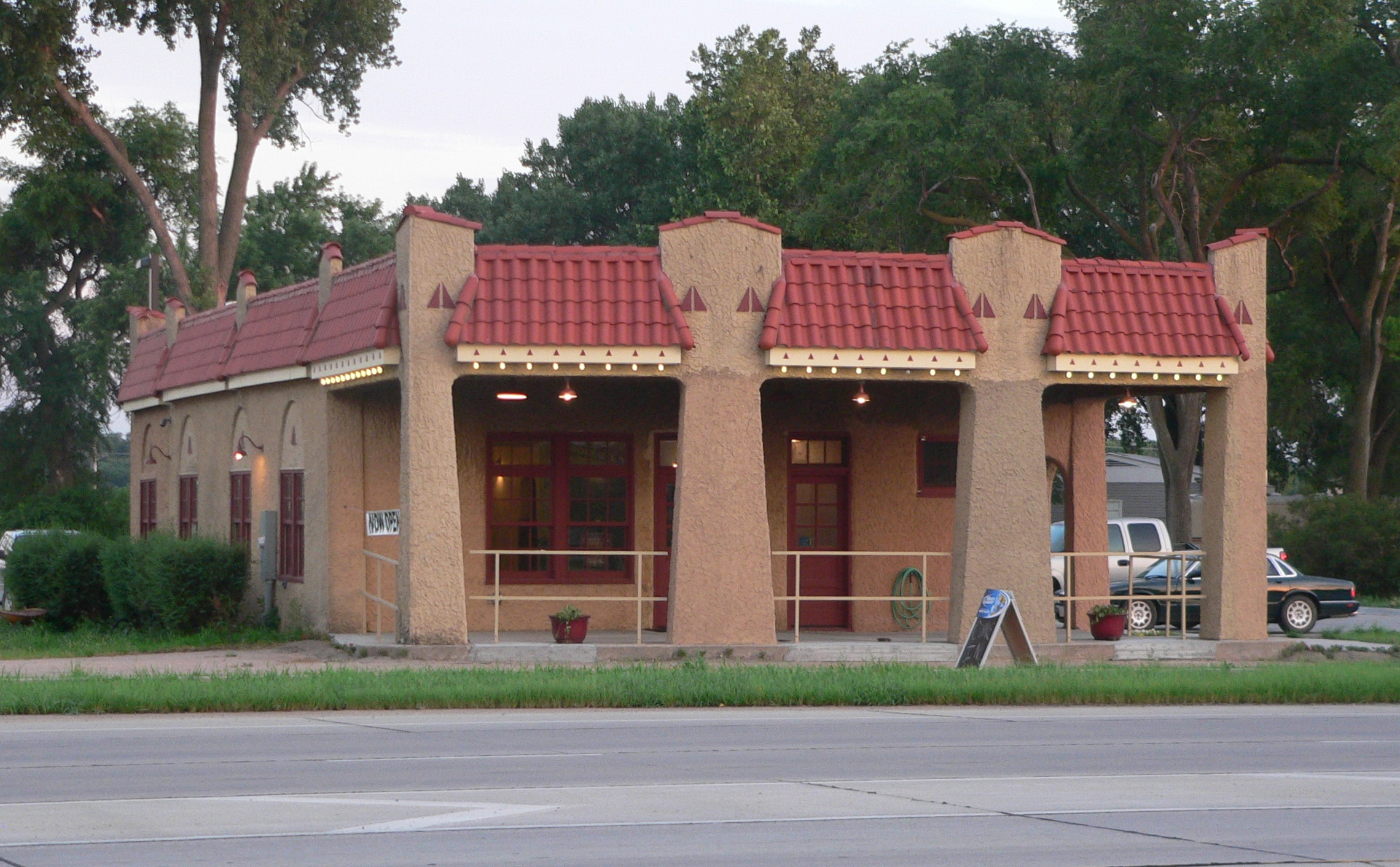

- Location within Nebraska
- Location: 3609 E. Hwy 30, Grand Island, Nebraska
- Coordinates: 40°56′19″N 98°18′03″W
- Area: less than one acre
- Built: 1931
- Architect: Chicago Lumber Co. Plan Service Dept
- Architectural style: Late 19th and 20th Century Revivals
- MPS: Lincoln Highway in Nebraska MPS
- NRHP reference No.: 08000601
- Added to NRHP: July 2, 2008

The Shady Bend Gas Station, Grocery, and Diner, at 3609 E. Hwy 30 in Grand Island, Nebraska, was built in 1931. It was listed on the National Register of Historic Places in 2008.

== History ==
Its building was built by H. O. "Doc" Woodward in 1931 as the main building of a cabin camp. The NRHP nomination states: "Shady Bend includes representative elements of the functions and services for travelers once offered by the larger and more elaborate privately-owned and operated roadside stops: a gasoline station, a grocery, public restrooms, a park and diner. Unfortunately, this property no longer has sufficient integrity to convey its significance as a tourist related cabin camp. This historic property, taken as a Lincoln Highway related roadside resource exhibiting architectural significance, does retain good integrity."
