= Weyl Service Station =

- U.S. National Register of Historic Places
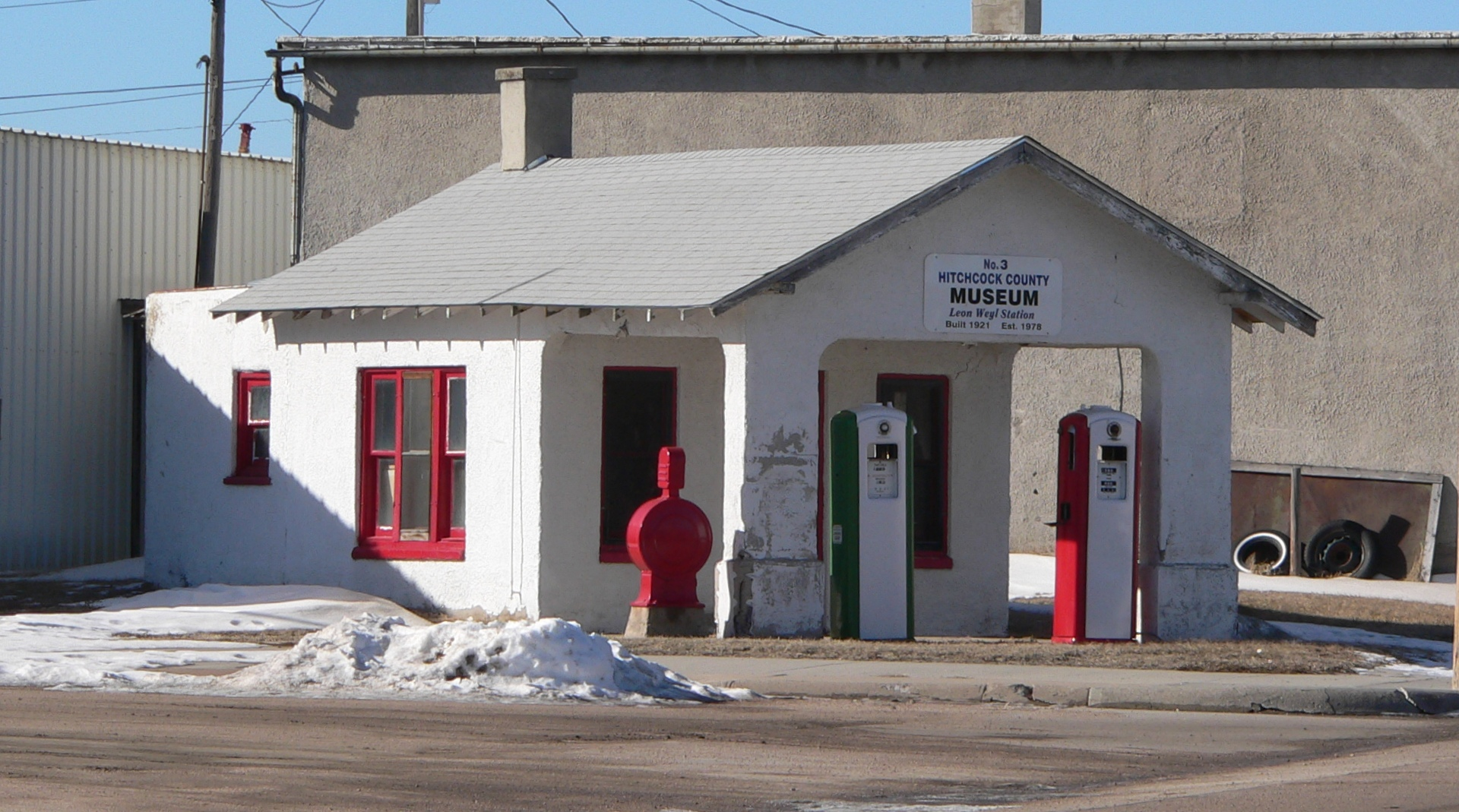

- Location within Nebraska Location within the United States
- Location: 124 E. D St., Trenton, Nebraska
- Coordinates: 40°10′32″N 101°00′41″W
- Area: less than one acre
- Built: 1921
- Built by: O.E. Reynolds
- Architectural style: Filling station
- NRHP reference No.: 02000768
- Added to NRHP: July 11, 2002

The Weyl Service Station, at 124 E. D St. in Trenton, Nebraska, was built in 1921. It was listed on the National Register of Historic Places in 2002.

It was then owned by the Hitchcock County Historical Society and was operated as a museum.
