= Henry W. Klotz Sr. Service Station =

- U.S. National Register of Historic Places
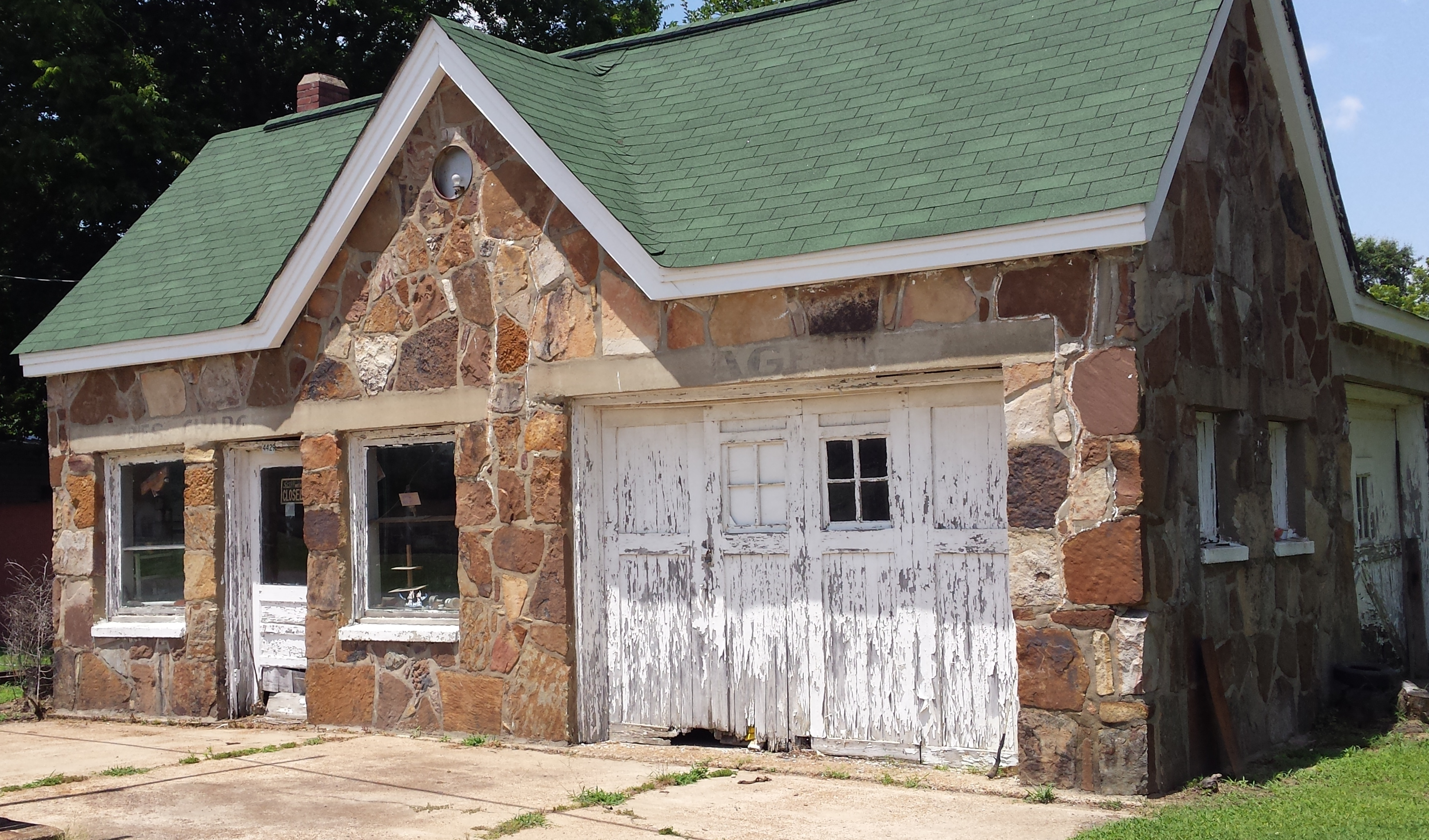

- Location within Arkansas Location within the United States
- Location: W. First St., Russell, Arkansas
- Coordinates: 35°21′51″N 91°30′27″W
- Area: less than one acre
- Architect: Courtney Nichols
- Architectural style: Vernacular T-shaped
- MPS: White County MPS
- NRHP reference No.: 91001273
- Added to NRHP: September 13, 1991

The Henry W. Klotz Sr. Service Station is a historic automotive service building of Henry W. Klotz Sr. on West First Street in Russell, Arkansas. It is a single-story stone structure, with a side gable roof and a central cross gable. It is T-shaped in layout, with an office to the left and service bay to the right. The office has a center entrance with flanking windows, and the service bay has wood panel doors. The building was built in 1938, using materials more commonly found at the time in residential construction.

The building was listed on the National Register of Historic Places in 1991.

== See also ==
- National Register of Historic Places listings in White County, Arkansas
