= E. W. Norris Service Station =

- U.S. National Register of Historic Places
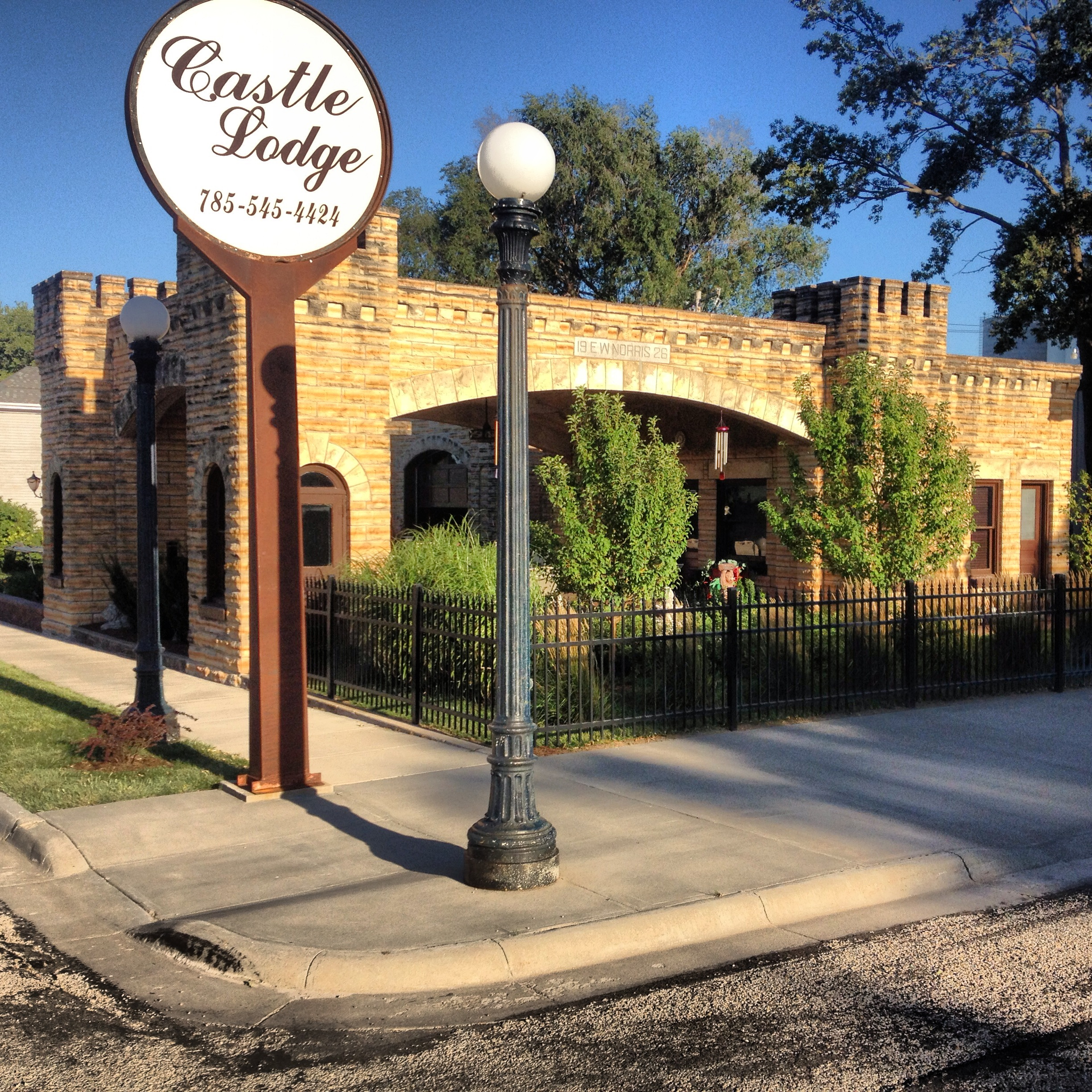

- Location within Kansas Location within the United States
- Location: Market and Main Sts., Glen Elder, Kansas
- Coordinates: 39°29′56″N 98°18′24″W
- Area: 1 acre (0.40 ha)
- Built: 1926
- Architect: Frank A. Slack
- NRHP reference No.: 76000832
- Added to NRHP: December 12, 1976

The E. W. Norris Service Station, at Market and Main Sts. in Glen Elder, Kansas, was built in 1926. It was listed on the National Register of Historic Places in 1976. The building is now the Castle Lodge hotel.

It is a 45 by 20 feet (13.7 m × 6.1 m) building made of creamy-buff post rock limestone quarried near Glen Elder.
