= Hale's Filling Station and Grocery =

- U.S. National Register of Historic Places
- Location within Montana Location within the United States
- Location: Lanark Townsite, Bainville, Montana
- Coordinates: 48°08′34″N 104°21′26″W
- Area: less than one acre
- Built: c.1928
- Built by: Hale, Lloyd
- MPS: Roadside Architecture Along US 2 in Montana MPS
- NRHP reference No.: 94000864
- Added to NRHP: August 16, 1994

Hale's Filling Station and Grocery is a site on the National Register of Historic Places located in Roosevelt County, Montana. It was added to the Register on August 16, 1994. It was a service station and a grocery store built probably in the late 1920s.

It is located on what was in 1994, an abandoned segment of old U.S. 2, between Bainville and Culbertson, Montana in the far northeastern corner of the state. It was the only remaining original building of the former town of Lanark.

When listed in 1994, the building was vacant and not in use.
