= Standard Oil Red Crown Service Station =

- U.S. National Register of Historic Places
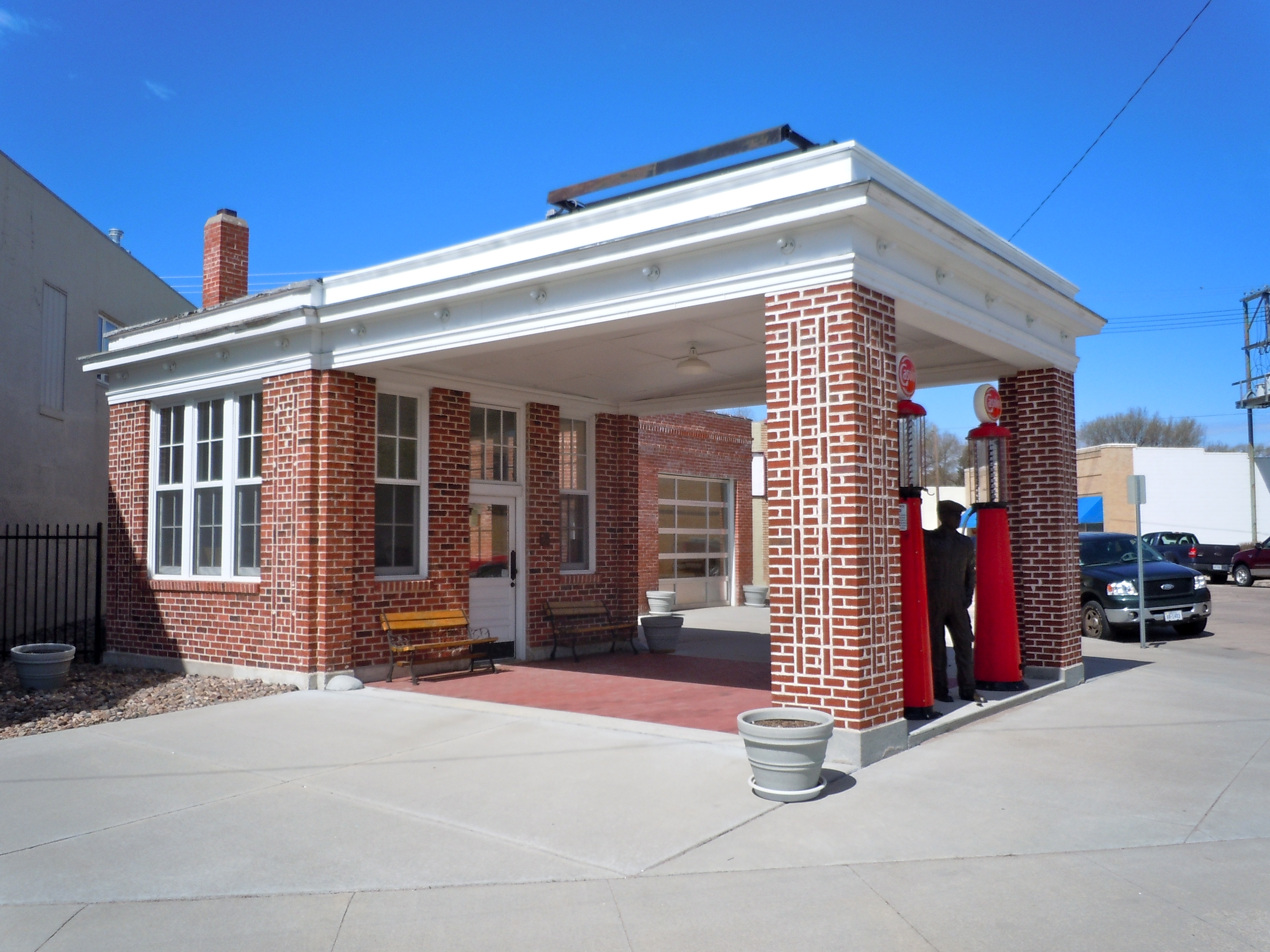

- Location within Nebraska
- Location: 220 N. Spruce St., Ogallala, Nebraska
- Coordinates: 41°07′34″N 101°43′09″W
- Area: less than one acre
- Built: 1922
- Architect: John McDonald, Alan McDonald
- Architectural style: Early Commercial
- MPS: Petroleum Marketing by the Standard Oil Company (Nebraska) MPS
- NRHP reference No.: 04000897
- Added to NRHP: August 20, 2004

The Standard Oil Red Crown Service Station, at 220 N. Spruce St. in Ogallala, Nebraska, was built in 1922. It was listed on the National Register of Historic Places in 2004.

It is a small brick building facing diagonally out on a corner lot, onto the main business street of Ogallala (Spruce Street) and 3rd Street. It was designed by architects John and Alan McDonald. It has also been known as the Spruce Street Station and later as the Spruce Street Visitors Center.
