= Westland Oil Filling Station =

Historic gas station in North Dakota, United States

- U.S. National Register of Historic Places
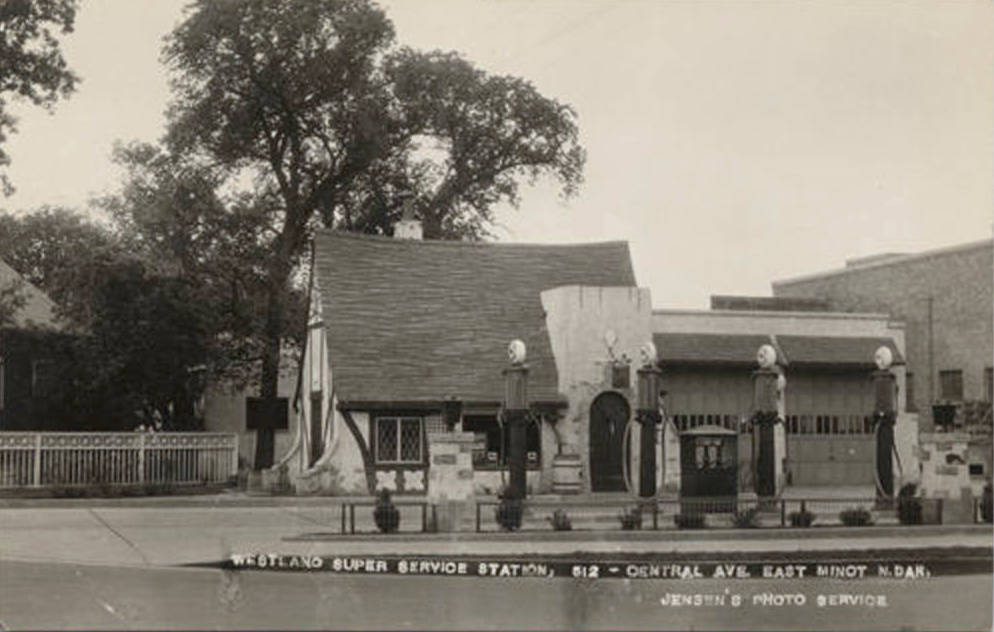
- Westland Super Service Station, 1930s

- Location within North Dakota Location within the United States
- Location: 510 E. Central Ave., Minot, North Dakota
- Coordinates: 48°14′11″N 101°17′5″W
- Area: less than one acre
- Built: 1929
- Architectural style: Domestic
- MPS: Minot MRA
- NRHP reference No.: 86002816
- Added to NRHP: February 27, 1987

The Westland Oil Filling Station in Minot, North Dakota was built in 1929. The gas station was listed on the National Register of Historic Places in 1987. According to its NRHP nomination form, its significance was based on its being an "outstanding example" of "a 1920s 'domestic' style gas station." As of 2022 the building had been converted into a brewery.

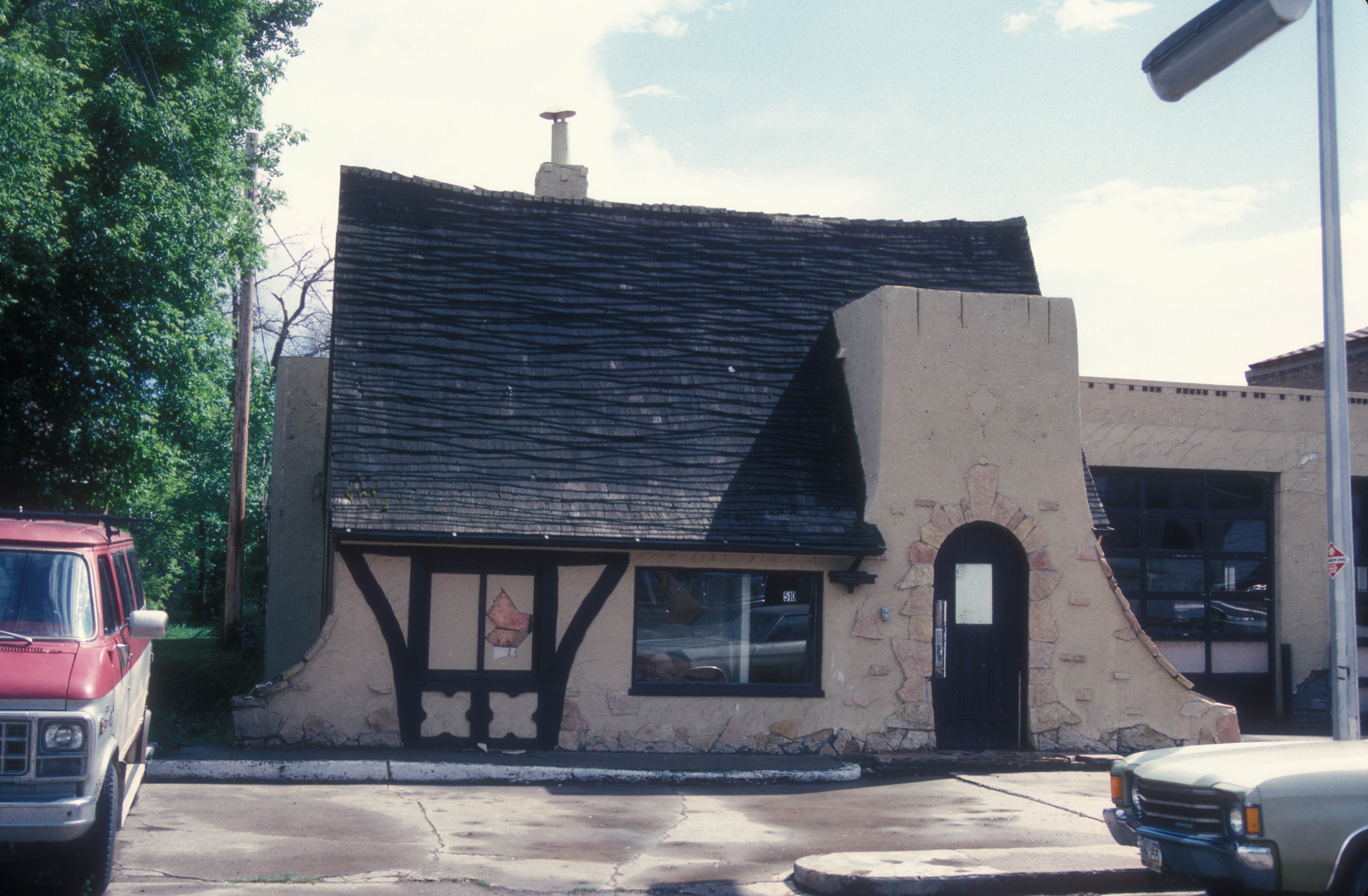
Station in 2007
