= Samuel P. Taylor Service Station =

- U.S. National Register of Historic Places
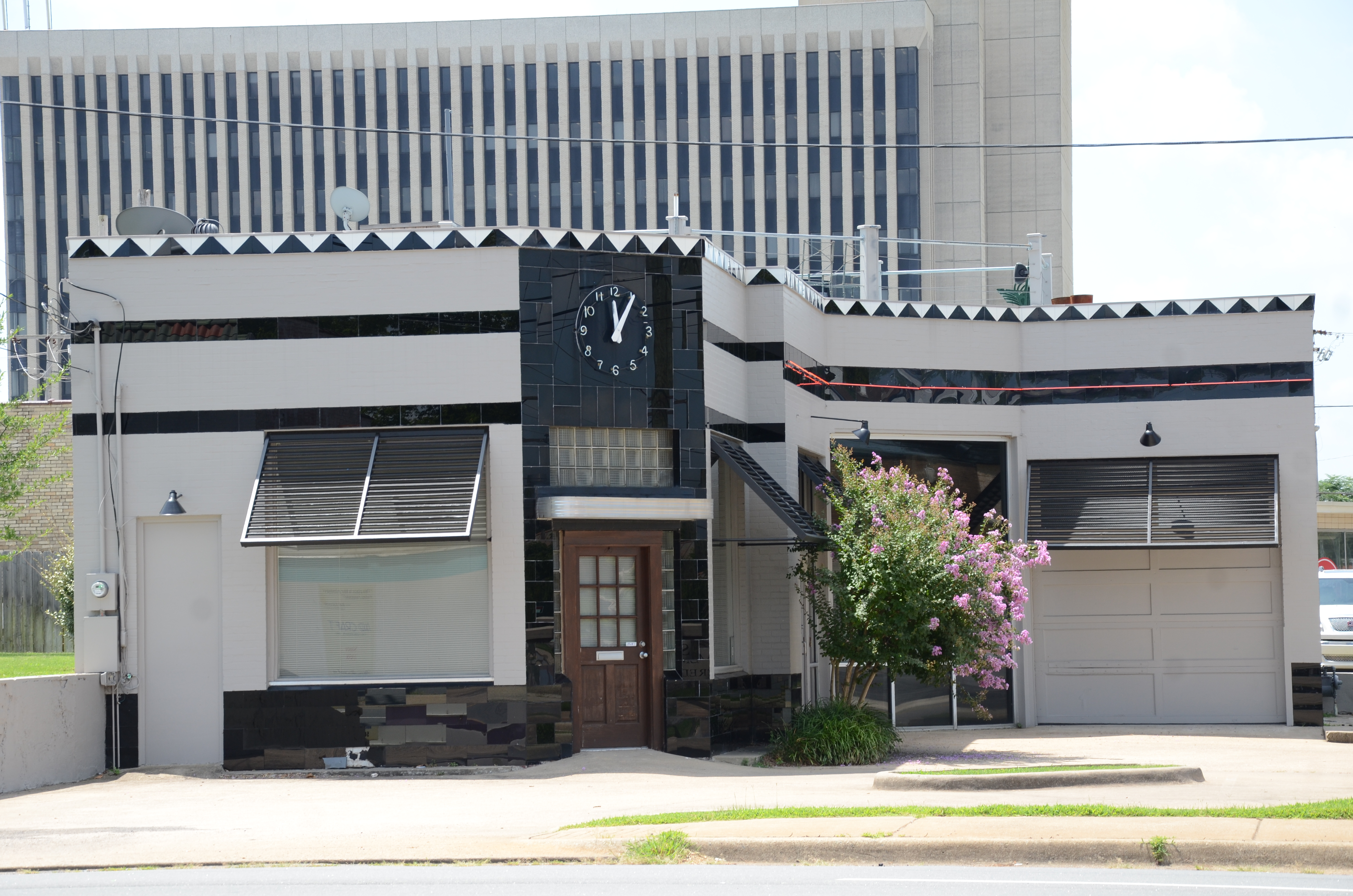

- Location within Arkansas Location within the United States
- Location: 1123 W. 3rd St., Little Rock, Arkansas
- Coordinates: 34°44′51″N 92°17′1″W
- Area: less than one acre
- Built: 1938
- Architect: John Saunders
- Architectural style: Art Deco
- MPS: Arkansas Highway History and Architecture MPS
- NRHP reference No.: 00001364
- Added to NRHP: November 29, 2000

The Samuel P. Taylor Service Station is a historic commercial building at 1123 West 3rd Street in Little Rock, Arkansas. Built in 1938, it is an excellent example of a period automotive filling station with Art Deco styling. It is a single-story L-shaped structure, with three service bays set at different angles, and an office in front. A zigzag pattern of black tiles extends across the building's cornice, and black tile is used prominently around the main entrance and below the office windows.

The building was listed on the National Register of Historic Places in 2000.

== See also ==
- National Register of Historic Places listings in Little Rock, Arkansas
