= Texas Company Filling Station =

- U.S. National Register of Historic Places
- Location within Texas Location within the United States
- Location: 102 S. Williams St., Victoria, Texas
- Coordinates: 28°47′54″N 97°00′15″W
- Area: less than one acre
- Built: 1925
- MPS: Victoria MRA
- NRHP reference No.: 86002595
- Added to NRHP: December 9, 1986

The Texas Company Filling Station, at 102 S. Williams St. in Victoria, Texas, was built in 1925. It was listed on the National Register of Historic Places in 1986.

It was a filling station with two service bays. When listed it was one of two pre-1935 service stations surviving in Victoria.

It has been demolished.
