= Gloe Brothers Service Station =

- U.S. National Register of Historic Places
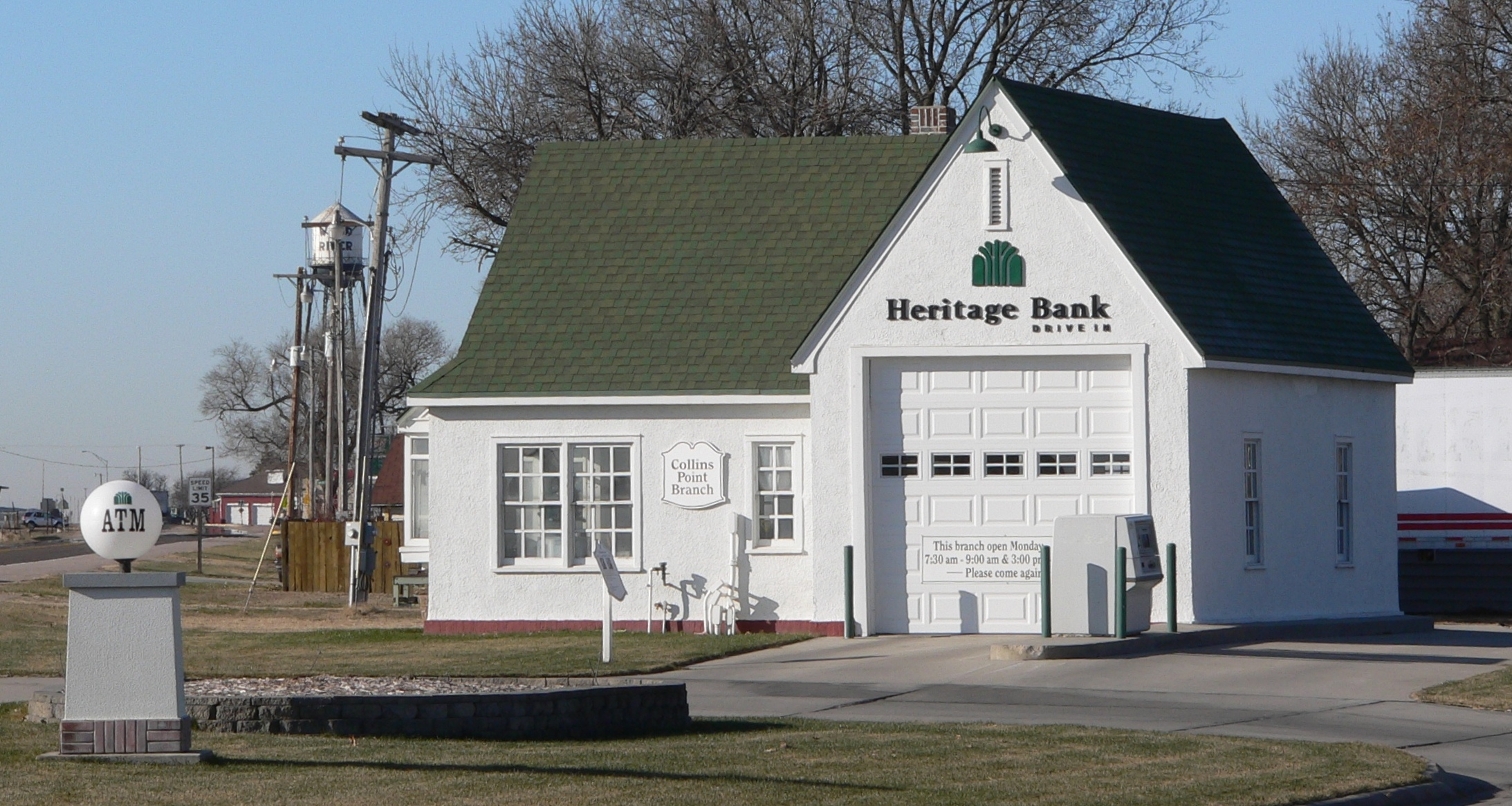
- Location: 609 E. 11th St., Wood River, Nebraska
- Coordinates: 40°49′20″N 98°35′38″W
- Area: less than one acre
- Built: 1933
- Architectural style: Commercial vernacular
- NRHP reference No.: 00000768
- Added to NRHP: July 5, 2000

The Gloe Brothers Service Station, at 609 E. 11th St. in Wood River, Nebraska, was built in 1933. It was added to the National Register of Historic Places in 2000.

It is located on a triangular property on U.S. Route 30 on the southeast edge of the town. It has also been known as the Collins Modern Service Station and as the Collins Point Branch of the Bank of Wood River.
