= Copeland & Tracht Service Station =

- U.S. National Register of Historic Places
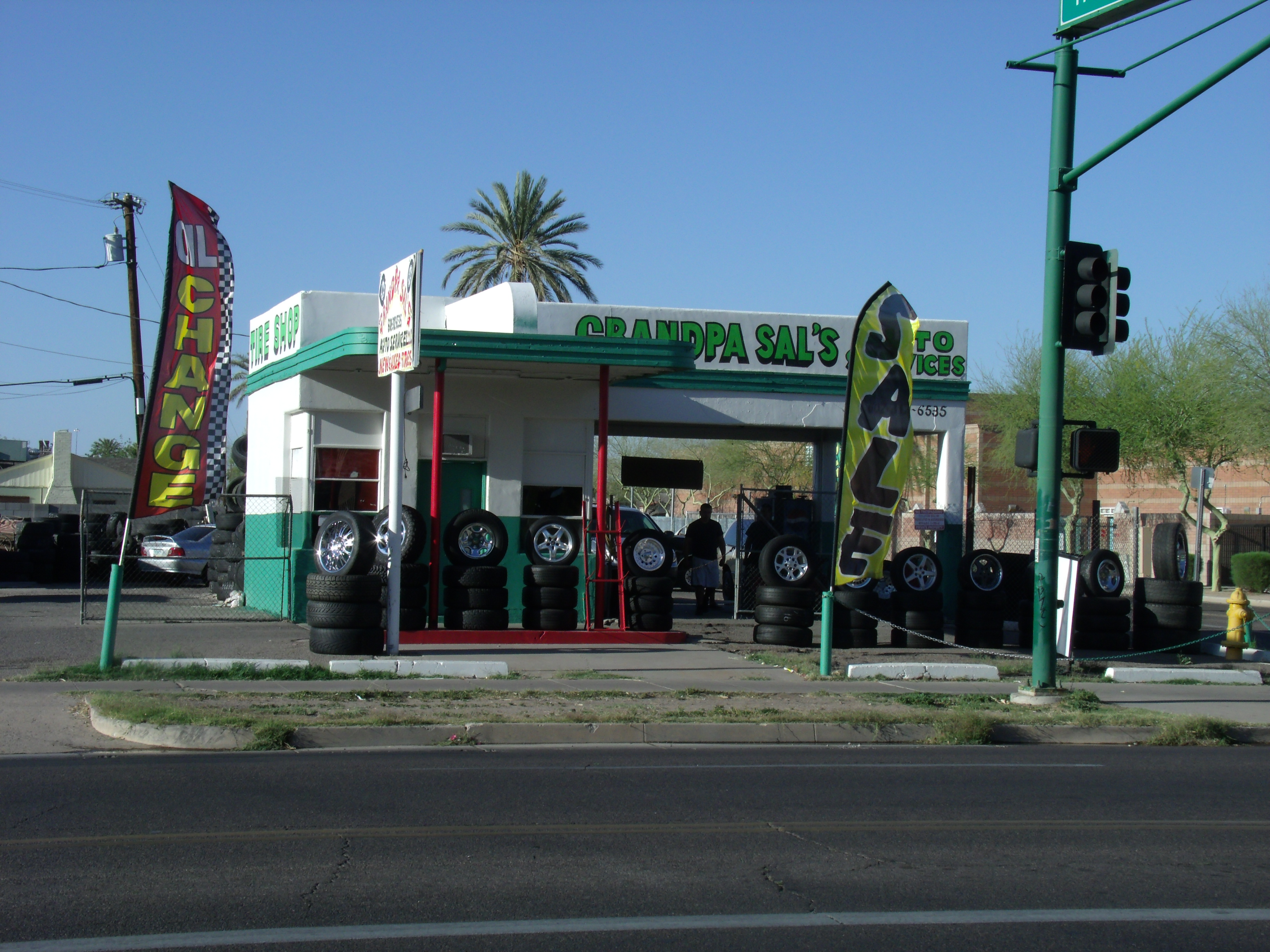

- Location within Arizona
- Location: 1702 W. Van Buren, Phoenix, Arizona
- Coordinates: 33°27′06″N 112°05′43″W
- Area: less than one acre
- Built: 1935
- Architectural style: Streamlined Modern
- MPS: Phoenix Commercial MRA
- NRHP reference No.: 85002054
- Added to NRHP: September 4, 1985

The Copeland & Tracht Service Station, in recent years Grandpa Sal's Tires, is located at 1702 W. Van Buren in Phoenix, Arizona and was built in 1935. It was originally the J.J. Fitzgibbon Service Station.

It was listed on the National Register of Historic Places in 1985.
