= Cave Creek Service Station =

- U.S. National Register of Historic Places
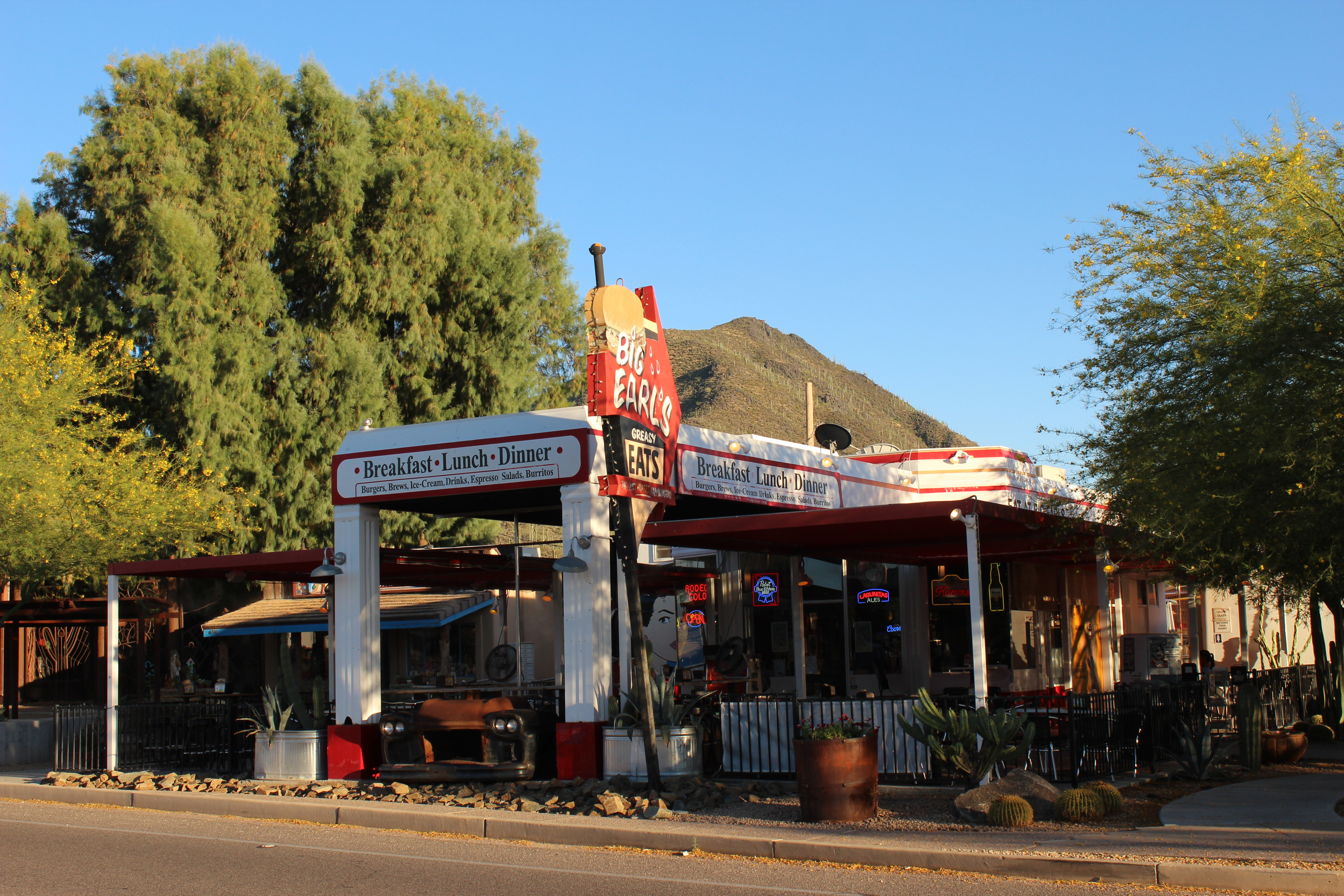

- Location within Arizona
- Location: 6141 Cave Creek Rd., Cave Creek, Arizona
- Coordinates: 33°49′55″N 111°56′51″W
- Area: less than one acre
- Built: 1936
- Built by: Aldrich, Ralph N.; Permutt, Gerry
- Architectural style: Moderne, International Style
- NRHP reference No.: 00001126
- Added to NRHP: September 22, 2000

The Cave Creek Service Station, at 6141 Cave Creek Rd. in Cave Creek, Arizona, was built in 1936. It was listed on the National Register of Historic Places in 2000.

According to its NRHP nomination, it is:

a good example of a style of automobile service station designed in 1935 and patented in 1936 by Ralph N. Aldrich for Standard Stations, Inc., a division of Standard Oil of California. The station is a prefabricated building consisting of galvanized steel panels on a frame of steel girders. The design reflects the Modern Movement, showing elements of the Streamline Moderne and International styles. Character-defining elements include the building's strong horizontal emphasis, smooth wall surface, flat roof with beveled coping at the roofline, extensive glazing, elongated canopy, minimal decoration, and streamlines on the canopy columns and entry surround. The station was originally erected in Phoenix circa 1936. In 1952 it was moved to Cave Creek, where it functioned as a service station until the late 1980s.
