= Gulf Oil Company Service Station (Paragould, Arkansas) =

- U.S. National Register of Historic Places
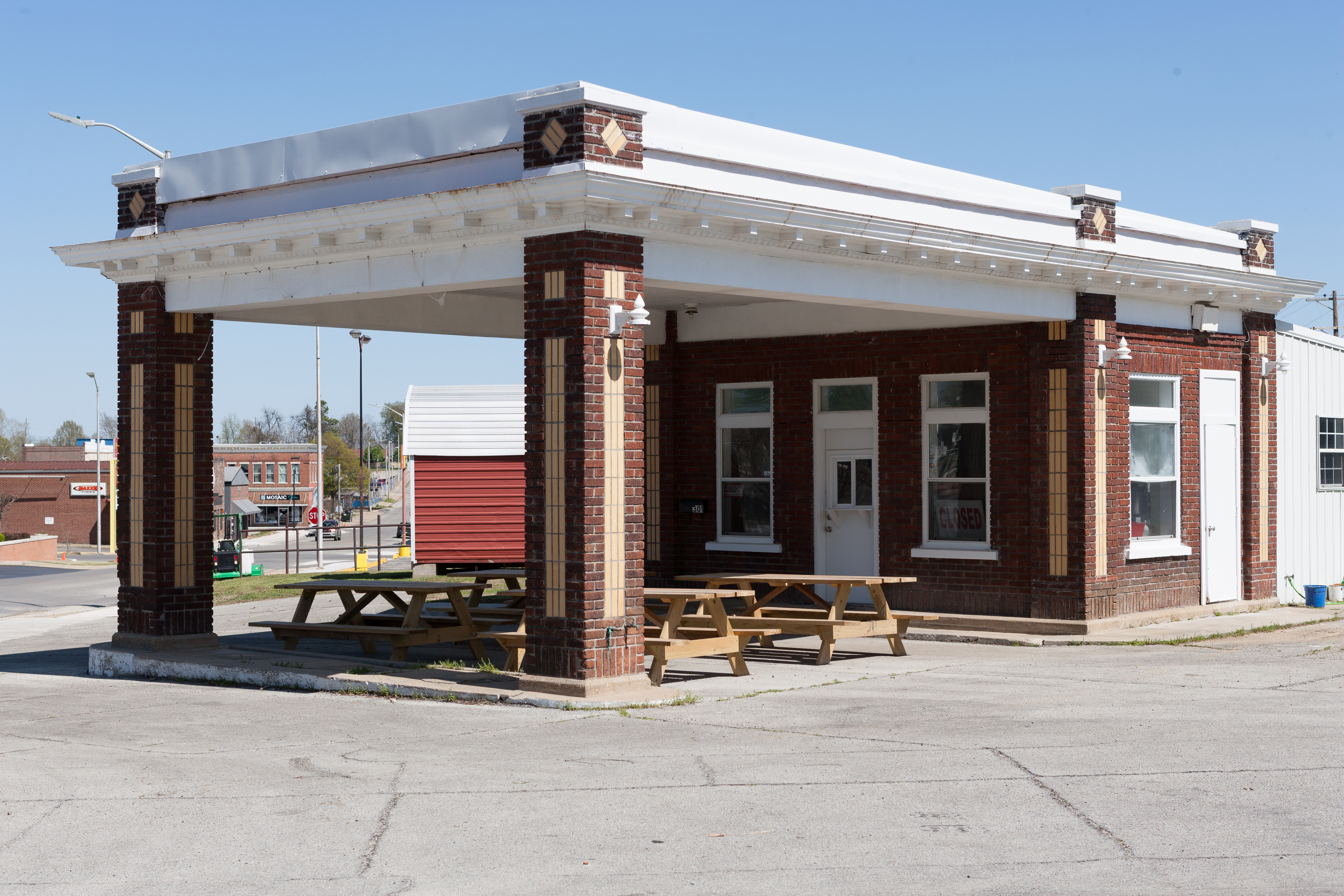

- Location within Arkansas Location within the United States
- Location: Jct. of Main and S. Third Sts., SE corner, Paragould, Arkansas
- Coordinates: 36°3′15″N 90°29′17″W
- Area: less than one acre
- Built: 1926
- Architectural style: Bungalow/craftsman, Mission/spanish Revival
- NRHP reference No.: 94000850
- Added to NRHP: August 16, 1994

The Gulf Oil Company Service Station is a former automotive service station at Main and South Third Streets in Paragould, Arkansas. Built in 1926, it is a single-story brick building, with a canopied area similar to a porte-cochere supported by brick columns. The building has stylistic elements giving it a vague Mediterranean appearance, including an entablature with egg-and-dart molding beneath a metal cornice and parapet. It is divided functionally into four rooms: an office, two restrooms, and a tool storage area. The building was used as a service station until 1969.

The building was listed on the National Register of Historic Places in 1994, at which time it was vacant; its owner since the 1940s refused offers to repurpose the building, preferring to keep it in pristine condition.

== See also ==
- National Register of Historic Places listings in Greene County, Arkansas
