= Pure Oil Service Station (Hartwell, Georgia) =

Historic place in Georgia, United States

- U.S. National Register of Historic Places
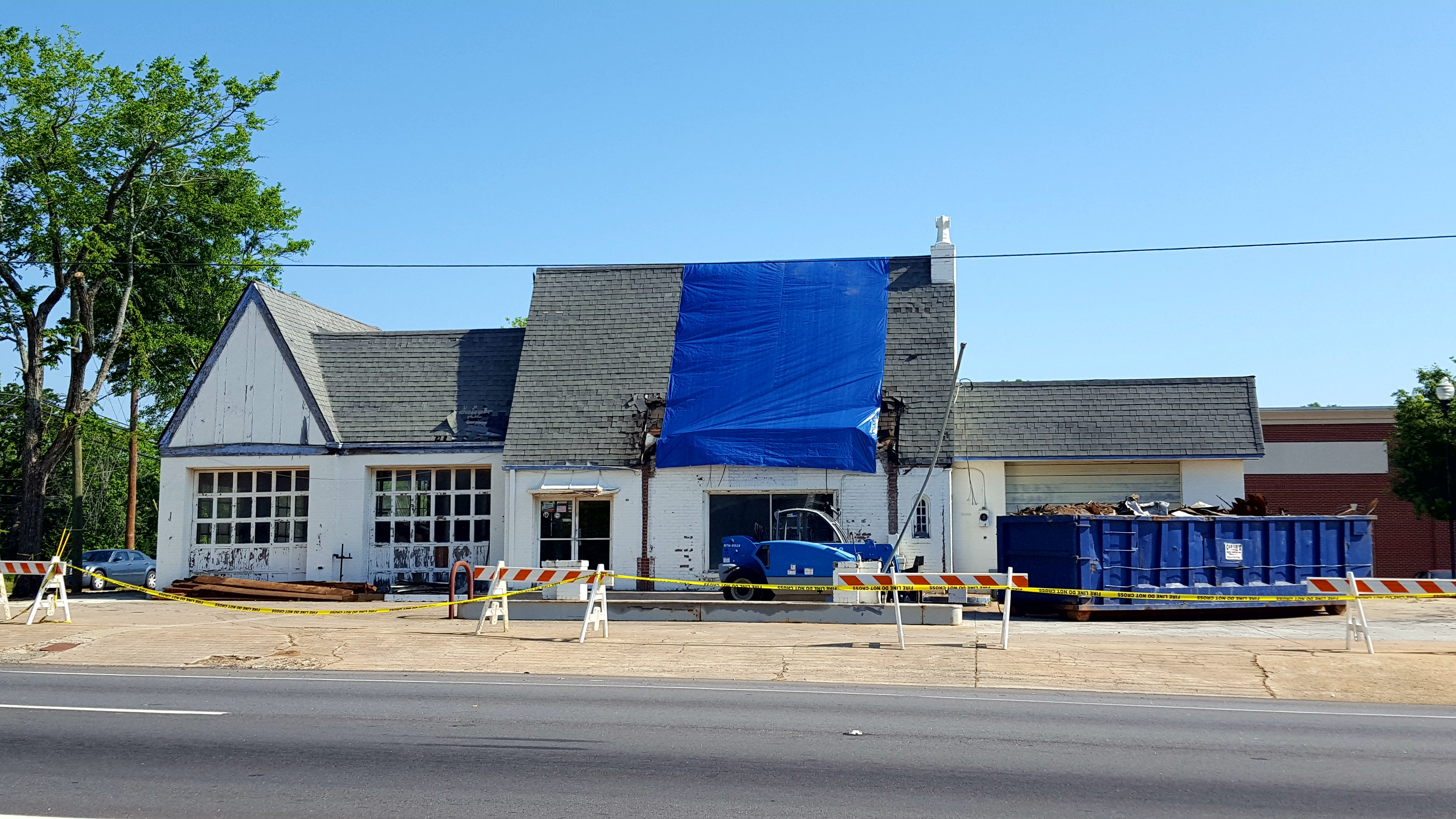

- Location within Georgia
- Location: Howell St. at Jackson St., Hartwell, Georgia
- Coordinates: 34°21′10″N 82°56′03″W
- Area: less than one acre
- Built: 1932
- Built by: Pure Oil Co.
- Architectural style: Tudor Revival
- MPS: Hartwell MRA
- NRHP reference No.: 86002047
- Added to NRHP: September 11, 1986

The Pure Oil Service Station in Hartwell, Georgia, on Howell St. at Jackson St., was built in 1932. It was listed on the National Register of Historic Places in 1986.

It has also been known as "White's Service Station & Muffler Shop" and "Willie's Service Station and Muffler shop". It is a one-story brick structure with styling derivative of English Tudor Revival architecture.
