= Pure Oil Service Station (Lavonia, Georgia) =

- U.S. National Register of Historic Places
- Location within Georgia
- Location: 56 West Ave., Lavonia, Georgia
- Coordinates: 34°26′07″N 83°06′28″W
- Area: less than one acre
- Built: 1935
- Architect: Pure Oil Co.
- MPS: Lavonia MRA
- NRHP reference No.: 83000216
- Added to NRHP: September 1, 1983

The Pure Oil Service Station in Lavonia, Georgia, located at 56 West Ave., was built in 1935. It was listed on the National Register of Historic Places in 1983.

It is a one-story brick building with a steep roof. It was operated as a service station until the 1970s.
