= Pure Oil Service Station (Saratoga Springs, New York) =

- Pure Oil Gas Station
- U.S. National Register of Historic Places
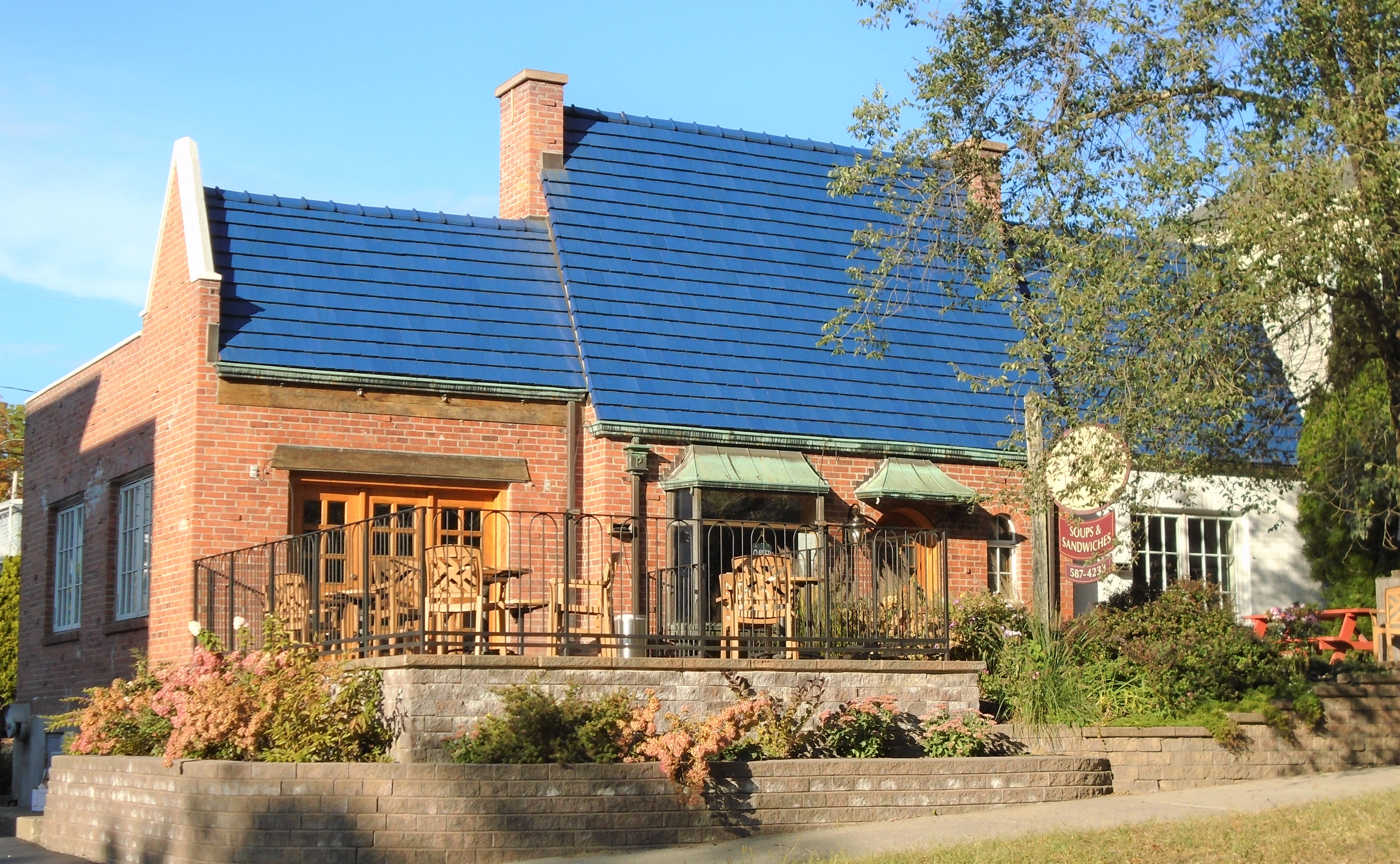
- (2020)

- Location within New York Location within the United States
- Location: 65 Spring Street; Saratoga Springs, New York
- Coordinates: 43°4′45″N 73°46′57″W
- Built: 1933
- Architect: Carl August Peterson
- Architectural style: Tudor Revival
- NRHP reference No.: 78001905
- Added to NRHP: October 18, 1978

The Pure Oil Service Station, located at 65 Spring Street in Saratoga Springs, Saratoga County, New York, is a historic service station. It was built in 1933 by the Pure Oil Co. in the Tudor Revival style. It was moved to its present location on Spring Street in 1978 after having been located at 522 Broadway. It is a one-story, brick building in three sections, measuring 34 feet by 27 feet. It consists of the main block housing the office with a rear wing and one stall garage. It features a steeply pitched roof of durable Ludowici tile.

It was listed on the National Register of Historic Places in 1978.

The building has now been adapted for reuse as a restaurant.
