= John A. Jakle =

American geography professor and author

- Born: John Allais Jakle; May 16, 1939 (age 87); Terre Haute, Indiana, U.S.
- Occupations: Geographer; professor; author
- Awards: J. B. Jackson prize; H.H. Douglas Award

John Allais Jakle (born May 16, 1939) is an American geographer. He is emeritus professor in the departments of geography and landscape architecture at the University of Illinois Urbana-Champaign.

== Early life and education ==
Jakle was born in 1939 in Terre Haute, Indiana. He grew up in Michigan and graduated from Culver Military Academy.

In 1961, Jakle graduated from Western Michigan University where he majored in geography and marketing. He received an MA from Southern Illinois University in 1963 and a PhD from Indiana University in 1967.

== Career ==
From 1965 to 1966, Jakle taught at the University of Maine. From 1966 to 1967, he taught at Western Michigan University. He then joined the geography faculty at the University of Illinois Urbana-Champaign. He was the department head from 1990 to 1994. He became professor emeritus in 2002.

Since 1996, Jakle has partnered with historic preservationist Keith Sculle, who worked for the Illinois Historic Preservation Agency, on nine books on the material culture of the American automobile. The "roadside America" books they have written include titles on gas stations, fast-food restaurants, motels, road signs, and parking lots.

Jake served on the committee which advocated for the Ohio River to be declared a National Heritage Corridor.

== Awards and honors ==
In 2001, Jakle was awarded the J.B Jackson prize of the American Association of Geographers for his book City Lights.

In 2004, Jakle received the H.H. Douglas Award of the International Society for Landscapes, Place, & Material Culture.

== Personal life ==
In 1958, Jakle married Cynthia Powell; they have two daughters.

== Books ==
- With Stanley Brunn and Curtis Roseman Human Spatial Behavior: A Social Geography (Duxbury Press, 1976)
- Images of the Ohio Valley: An Historical Geography of Travel, 1740–1860 (Oxford University Press, 1977)
- The American Small Town: Twentieth-Century Place Images (Archon Books, 1982)
- The Tourist: Travel in Twentieth-Century North America (University of Nebraska Press, 1985)
- The Visual Elements of Landscape (University of Massachusetts Press, 1987)
- With Robert Bastian and Douglas Meyer Common Houses in America's Small Towns: The Atlantic Seaboard to the Mississippi Valley (University of Georgia Press, 1989)
- With David Wilson Derelict Landscapes: The Wasting of America's Built Environment (Rowman & Littlefield, 1992)
- The Gas Station in America (Johns Hopkins University Press, 1994)
- with Keith A. Sculle and Jefferson Rogers The Motel in America (Johns Hopkins University Press, 1996)
- Fast Food Restaurants in the Automobile Age (Johns Hopkins University Press, 1999)
- With Keith A. Sculle Lots of Parking Land Use in a Car Culture (University of Virginia Press, 2004)
- City Lights: Illuminating the American Night (Johns Hopkins University Press, 2001)
- Postcards of the Night: Views of American Cities (Museum of New Mexico Press, 2003)
- With Keith A. Sculle Signs in America's Auto Age: Signatures of Landscape and Place (University of Iowa Press, 2004)
- My Kind of Midwest (University of Chicago Press, 2008)
- with Keith A. Sculle Motoring: The Highway Experience in America (University of Georgia Press, 2008)
- with Keith A. Sculle America's Main Street Hotels: Transiency and Community in the Early Auto Age (University of Tennessee Press, 2009)
- with Keith A. Sculle Remembering Roadside America: Preserving the Recent Past as Landscape and Place (University of Tennessee Press, 2011)
- with Keith A. Sculle Picturing Illinois: Twentieth-Century Postcard Art from Chicago to Cairo (University of Illinois Press, 2012)
- with Keith A. Sculle The Garage: Automobility and Building Innovation in America's Early Auto Age (University of Tennessee Press, 2013)
- with Keith A. Sculle Supplanting America's Railroads: The Early Auto Age, 1900-1940 (University of Tennessee Press, 2016)
