= Texaco Service Station =

Texaco Service Station may refer to:

- Harvey's Grocery and Texaco Station, Camden, Arkansas, listed on the National Register of Historic Places (NRHP)
- Rison Texaco Service Station, Rison, Arkansas, NRHP-listed
- Texaco Station No. 1, Paragould, Arkansas, NRHP-listed
- Ambler's Texaco Gas Station, Dwight, Illinois, NRHP-listed
- Deerfield Texaco Service Station, Deerfield, Kansas, NRHP-listed
- Dave's Texaco, Chinook, Montana, NRHP-listed
- Texaco Service Station (Bristow, Oklahoma), NRHP-listed
