= Paragould War Memorial =

- U.S. National Register of Historic Places
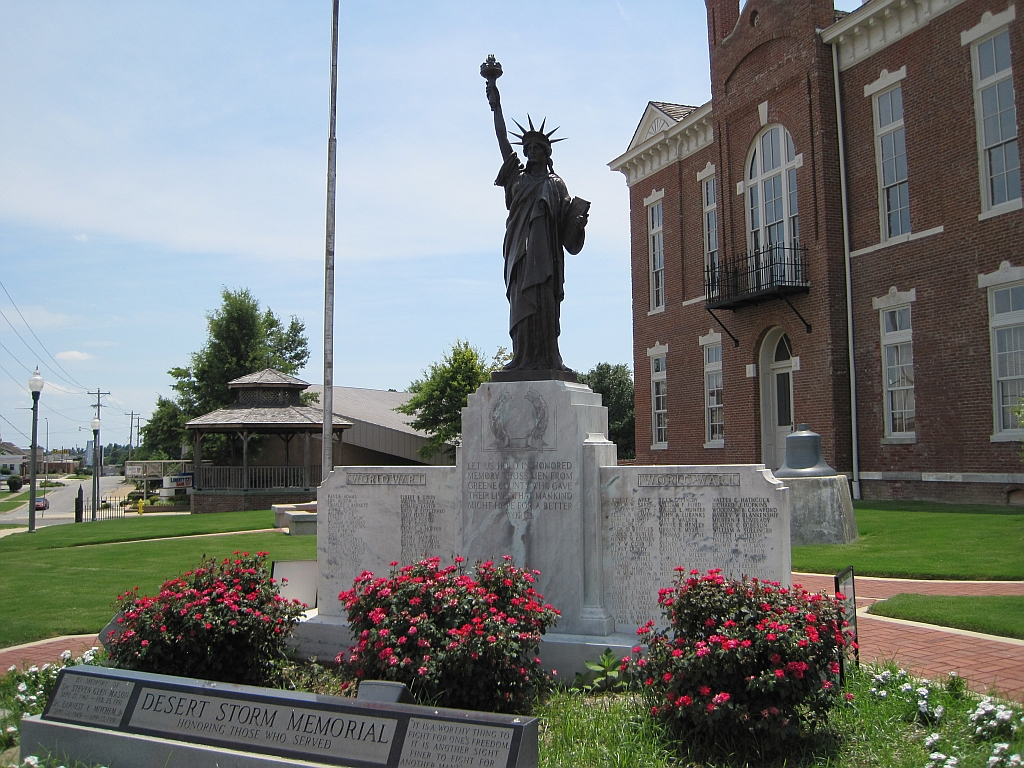

- Location within Arkansas Location within the United States
- Location: Jct. of 3rd and Court Sts., Paragould, Arkansas
- Coordinates: 36°3′21″N 90°29′20″W
- Area: less than one acre
- Built: 1924
- Built by: American Art Bronze Foundry
- Architect: John Paulding
- Architectural style: bronze statue
- NRHP reference No.: 97000554
- Added to NRHP: June 20, 1997

The Paragould War Memorial is a scaled-down replica of the Statue of Liberty, located in Courthouse Park near the Greene County Courthouse at the heart of Paragould, Arkansas. The statue is a bronze cast created by John Paulding and was cast at the American Art Bronze Foundry in Chicago, Illinois in 1920. The statue is 95 inches (2.4 m) high and is mounted on a rectangular marble base 80 inches (2.0 m) high. It was erected to honor the city's soldiers who participated in World War I, and is the only sculptural memorial in Arkansas from that war that is not a doughboy statue.

The memorial was listed on the National Register of Historic Places in 1997.

== See also ==
- National Register of Historic Places listings in Greene County, Arkansas
- Replicas of the Statue of Liberty
