= Linwood Mausoleum =

Historic site in Greene County, Arkansas

- U.S. National Register of Historic Places
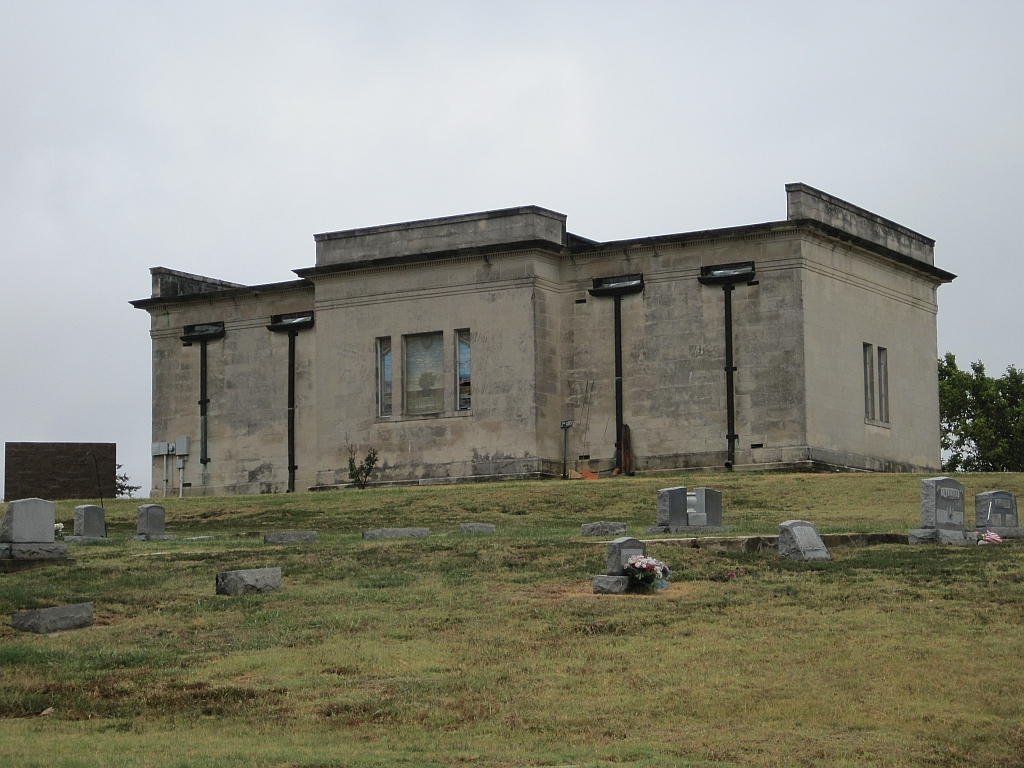

- Location within Arkansas Location within the United States
- Location: Jct. of W. Kingshighway and Linwood Dr., Paragould, Arkansas
- Coordinates: 36°3′4″N 90°30′11″W
- Area: less than one acre
- Built: 1920
- Built by: Southwest Mausoleum Co.
- Architectural style: Classical Revival
- NRHP reference No.: 06001314
- Added to NRHP: January 29, 2007

The Linwood Mausoleum is a massive limestone structure in Linwood Cemetery, Paragould, Arkansas. Occupying the highest ground in the cemetery, it is a rectangular single-story Classical Revival limestone structure, with stained-glass windows. Its interior walls are finished with gray-veined white marble. The entry is sheltered by a portico with Doric columns. The mausoleum houses 170 crypts. Built in 1920 by a group of private citizens, it was later conveyed to the city, and is (as of 2007) Arkansas' only known city-owned mausoleum. It is also architecturally distinctive in the region for its heavy limestone construction and Classical Revival features.

The building was listed on the National Register of Historic Places in 2007.

== See also ==
- Mount Holly Mausoleum: NRHP listing in Little Rock, Arkansas
- National Register of Historic Places listings in Greene County, Arkansas
