= Jackson–Herget House =

Historic house in Arkansas, United States

- U.S. National Register of Historic Places
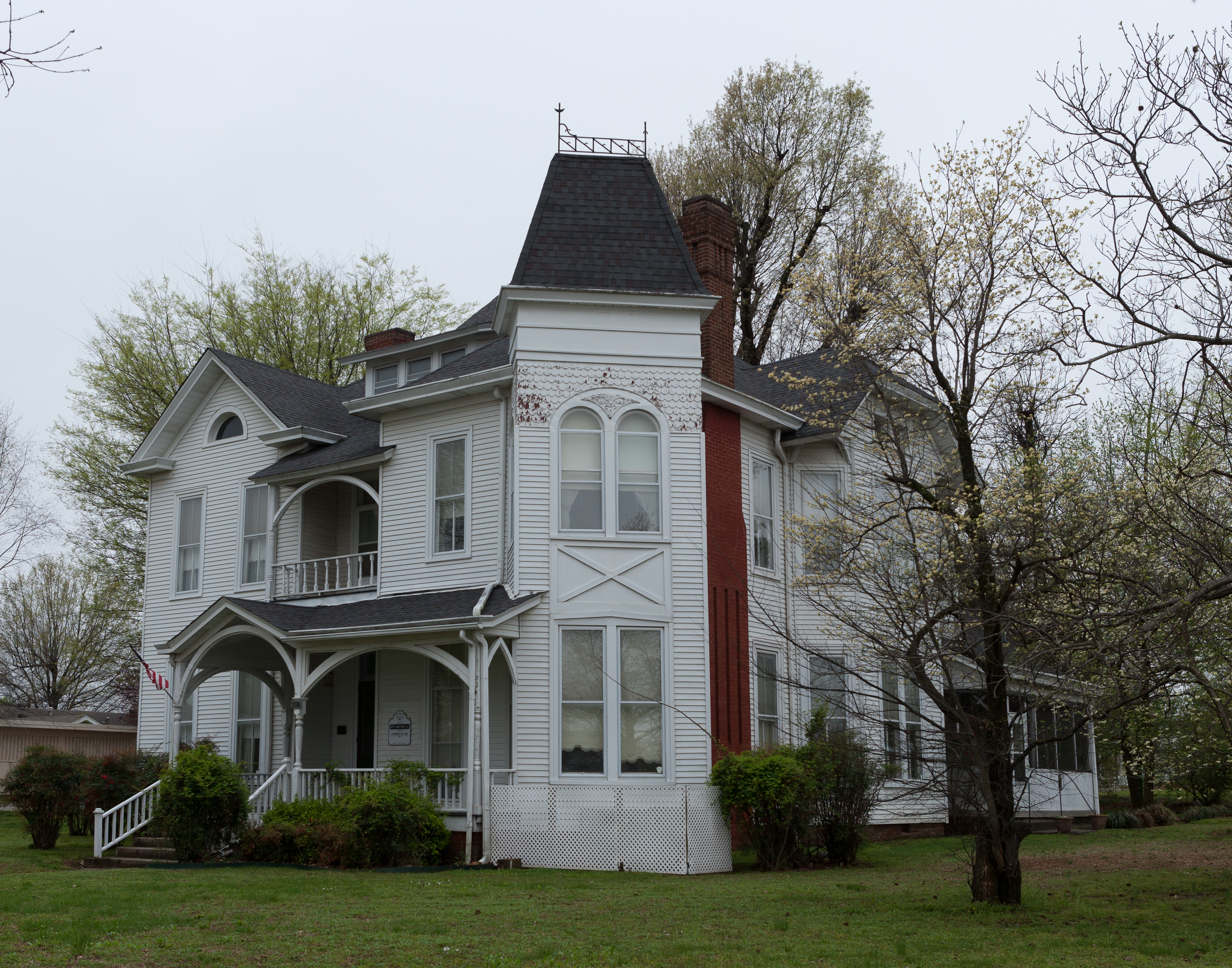

- Location within Arkansas Location within the United States
- Location: 206 S. 4th St., Paragould, Arkansas
- Coordinates: 36°3′18″N 90°29′26″W
- Area: 1 acre (0.40 ha)
- Built: 1890
- Architect: Thomas Harding Sr.
- Architectural style: Queen Anne
- NRHP reference No.: 92000907
- Added to NRHP: July 24, 1992

The Jackson–Herget House is a historic house at 206 South 4th Street in Paragould, Arkansas. It is a 2 1/2-story wood-frame structure, clad in aluminum siding. It has asymmetrical massing typical of the Queen Anne period, with a variety of gables, projecting sections, porches, and a three-story tower topped with a steeply pitched hip roof and wrought iron railing. It is one of the finest Queen Anne houses in Greene County, despite the aluminum siding, which was added in such a way to match the earlier clapboarding and without destroying some of the trim.

== Significance ==
The house is notable as the home of Richard Jackson, one of Paragould's leading businessmen and civic boosters.

The house was listed on the National Register of Historic Places in 1992. It is protected by The Arkansas Historic Preservation Program which identifies, evaluates, registers and preserves the State's Historic and Cultural Resources including the Jackson–Herget House.

== See also ==
- National Register of Historic Places listings in Greene County, Arkansas
