= Paragould Downtown Commercial Historic District =

Historic district in Arkansas, United States

- U.S. National Register of Historic Places
- U.S. Historic district
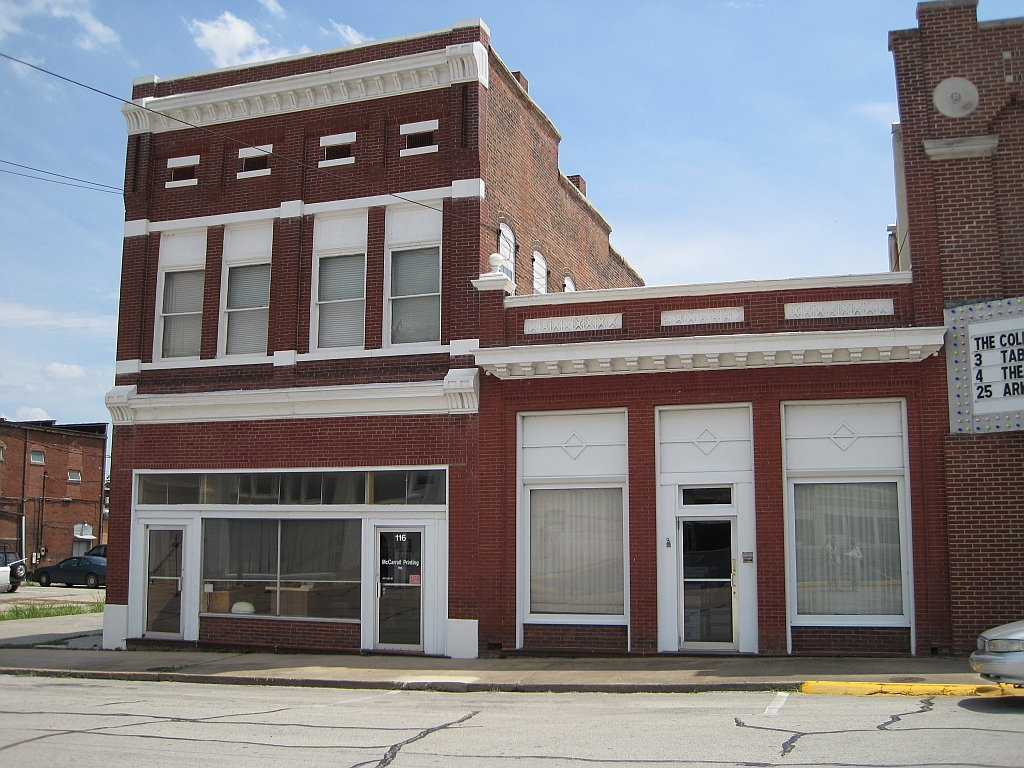

- Location within Arkansas Location within the United States
- Location: Roughly bounded by 3rd Ave., Kingshighway, 3 1/2 St., and W. Highland St., Paragould, Arkansas
- Coordinates: 36.05595°N 90.48622°W
- Area: 40 acres (16 ha)
- Built: 1883
- Architect: Boone & McGinnis; et.al.
- Architectural style: Early Commercial, Classical Revival
- NRHP reference No.: 03000646
- Added to NRHP: July 18, 2003

The Paragould Downtown Commercial Historic District encompasses the historic central business district of Paragould, Arkansas. The city was organized in 1882 around the intersection of two railroad lines, which lies in the southwestern portion of this district. The main axes of the district are Court and Pruett Streets, extending along Court from 3½ Street to 3rd Avenue, and along Court from King's Highway to Highland Street, with properties also on adjacent streets. Prominent in the district are the 1888 Greene County Courthouse, built during the city's first major growth spurt. Most of the district's buildings are one and two stories in height, and of masonry (mainly brick) construction. The National Bank of Commerce Building at 200 S. Pruett is a notable example of limestone construction, and of Classical Revival styling found in some of the buildings put up during the city's second major growth period in the 1920s.

The district was listed on the National Register of Historic Places in 2003.

== See also ==
- National Register of Historic Places listings in Greene County, Arkansas
