= St. Mary's Catholic Church (Paragould, Arkansas) =

Historic church in Arkansas, United States

- U.S. National Register of Historic Places
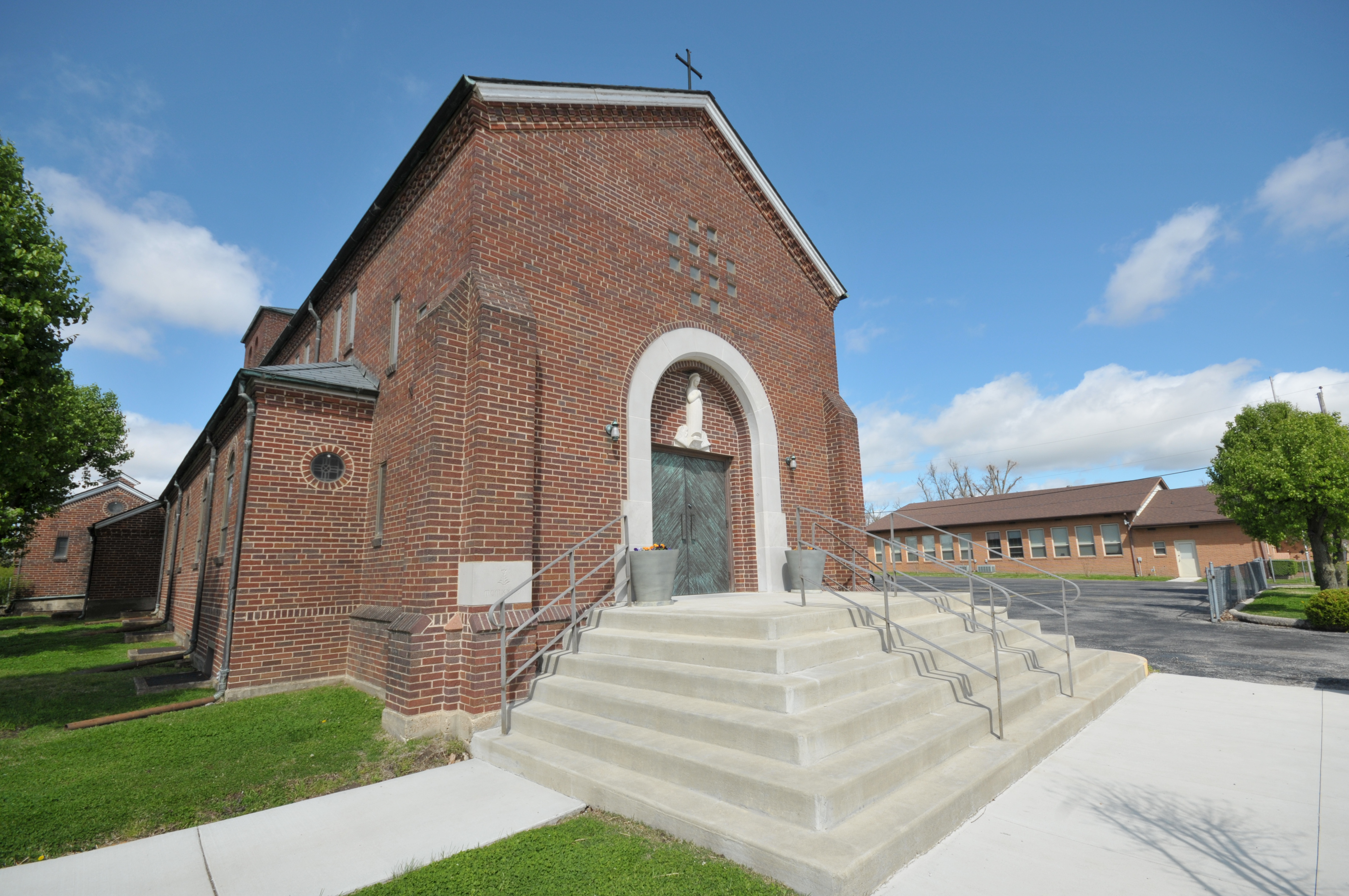

- Location within Arkansas Location within the United States
- Location: 301 W. Highland; Paragould, Arkansas
- Coordinates: 36°3′39″N 90°29′15″W
- Architect: Charles Eames
- NRHP reference No.: 14001198
- Added to NRHP: January 27, 2015

The St. Mary's Catholic Church is a historic church building at 301 W. Highland in Paragould, Arkansas. It was designed early in the career of Charles Eames, and is one of only two known church designs of his in Arkansas, the other being St. Mary's, Helena. Built in 1935, it is stylistically a modern reinterpretation of Romanesque Revival architecture. The congregation was organized in 1883; this is its second sanctuary.

The church was listed on the National Register of Historic Places in 1978.

== See also ==
- National Register of Historic Places listings in Greene County, Arkansas
