= Highfill-McClure House =

Historic house in Arkansas, United States

- U.S. National Register of Historic Places
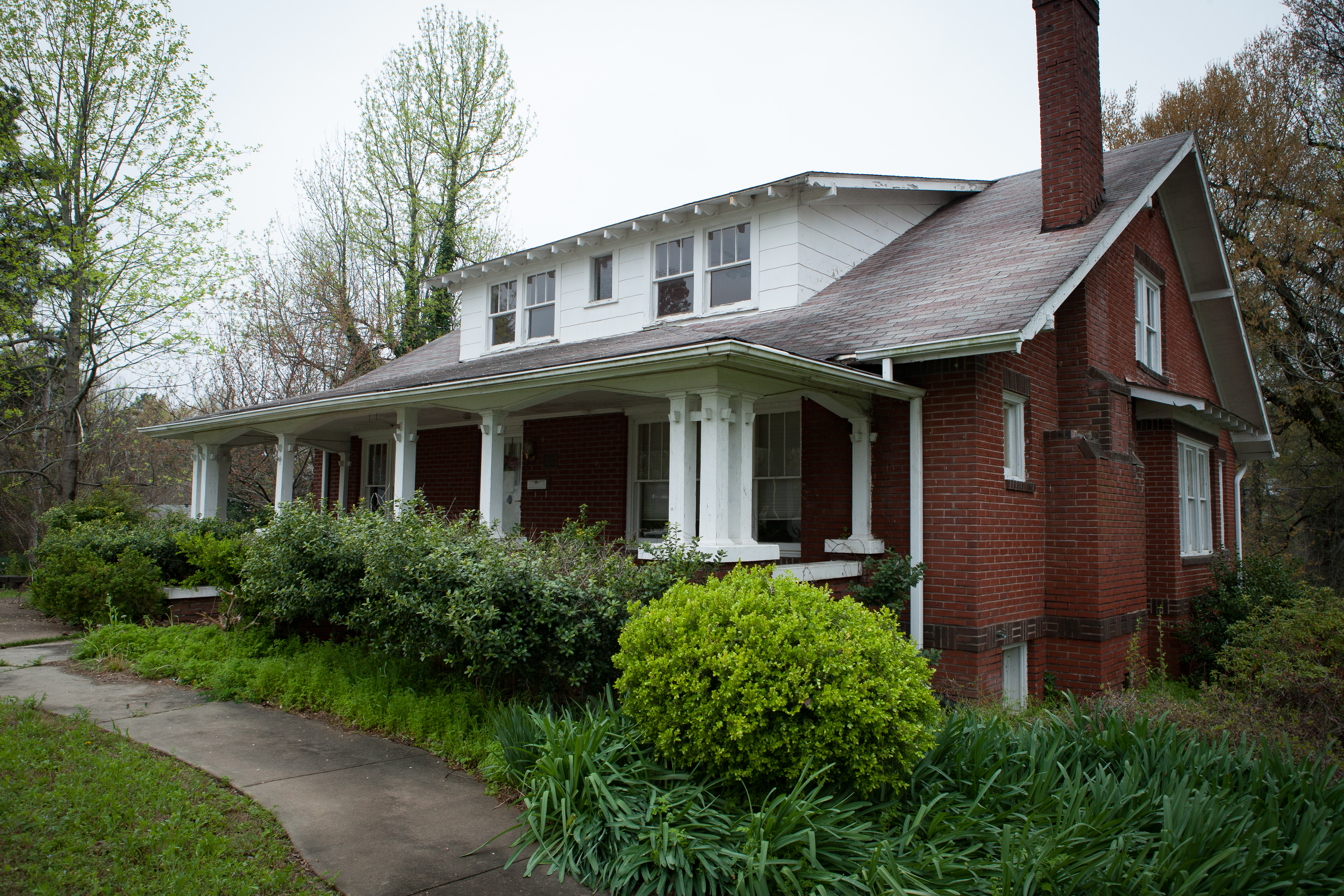

- Location within Arkansas Location within the United States
- Location: 701 W. Highland St., Paragould, Arkansas
- Coordinates: 36°3′28″N 90°29′40″W
- Area: less than one acre
- Built: 1937
- Built by: Alfred Thomas
- Architect: Alfred Thomas
- Architectural style: Bungalow/craftsman
- NRHP reference No.: 02000260
- Added to NRHP: March 28, 2002

The Highfill-McClure House is a historic house at 701 West Highland Street in Paragould, Arkansas. It is a 1 ½-story wood-frame structure, finished with a brick veneer. It is a well-preserved and high-quality example of Craftsman architecture, with a side-gable roof, exposed rafter tails, and a band of decorative brickwork along the basement line. The house was built in 1937 for Claude Highfill, and sold in 1969 to Gary McClure.

The house was listed on the National Register of Historic Places in 2002.

== See also ==
- National Register of Historic Places listings in Greene County, Arkansas
