= George Ray's Dragstrip =

- U.S. National Register of Historic Places
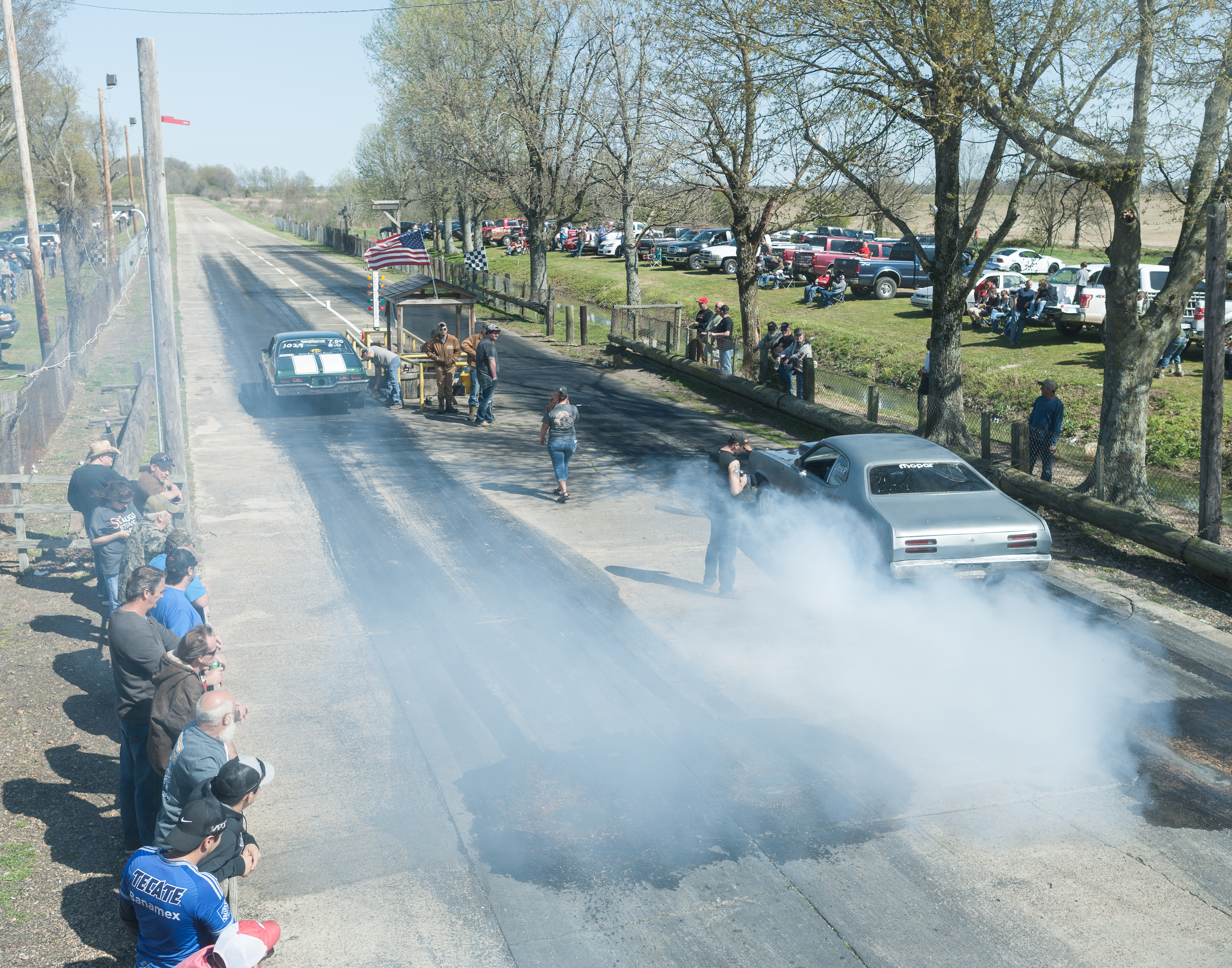

- Location within Arkansas Location within the United States
- Nearest city: Paragould, Arkansas
- Coordinates: 36.047222°N 90.434444°W
- Area: 22.5 acres (9.1 ha)
- Built: 1961
- Built by: George Ray
- NRHP reference No.: 06000075
- Added to NRHP: February 21, 2006

George Ray's Dragstrip is an automotive drag racing strip in Paragould, Arkansas. Built in 1961 by the famous George Ray, it is the oldest single-purpose drag racing facility in Arkansas. It is located on Arkansas Highway 135, east of Paragould, with racing occurring (in season and weather permitting) every Sunday. Its facilities include a concrete racing strip 2,960 feet (900 m) long and 31 feet (9.4 m) wide, with bleachers along the sides and a spectator catwalk (an original feature dating to its early years). The facility was listed on the National Register of Historic Places in 2006.

== See also ==
- National Register of Historic Places listings in Greene County, Arkansas
