= National Bank of Commerce Building (Paragould, Arkansas) =

- U.S. National Register of Historic Places
- U.S. Historic district – Contributing property
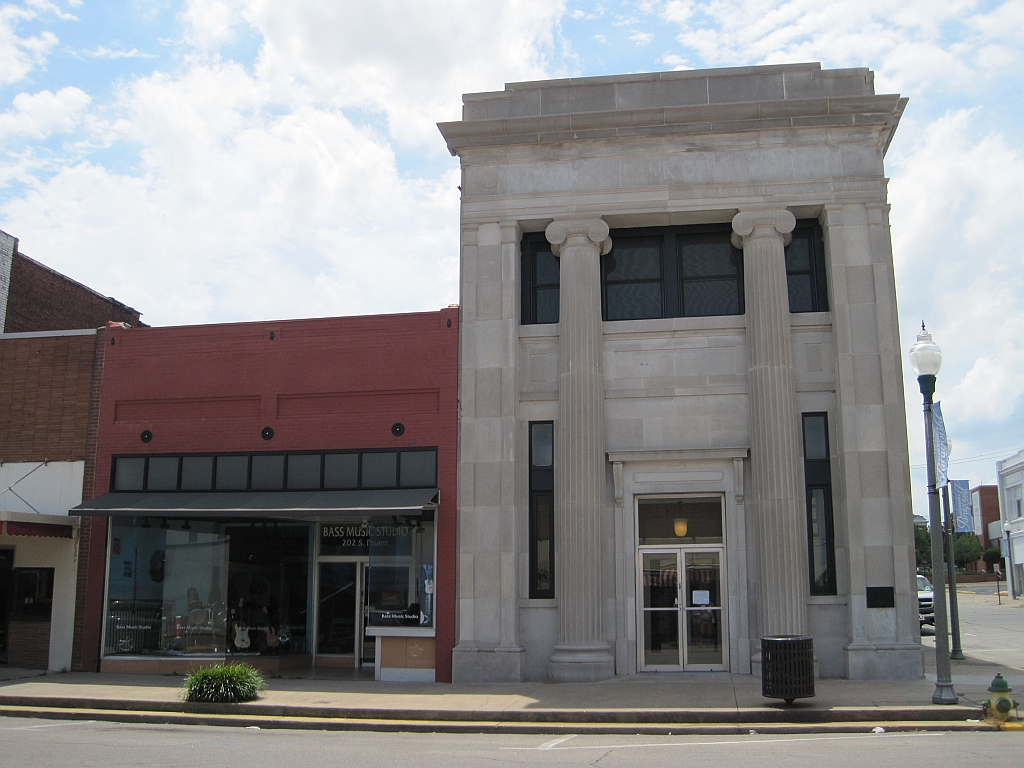

- Location within Arkansas Location within the United States
- Location: 200 S. Pruett St., Paragould, Arkansas
- Coordinates: 36°3′19″N 90°29′11″W
- Architect: Hankers and Cairns; Lesmeister
- Architectural style: Classical Revival
- Part of: Paragould Downtown Commercial Historic District (ID03000646)
- NRHP reference No.: 93000423

Significant dates
- Added to NRHP: May 14, 1993
- Designated CP: July 18, 2003

The National Bank of Commerce Building is a historic commercial building at 200 S. Pruett St. in downtown Paragould, Arkansas. It is a two-story structure, built out of cut stone, with a center entrance recessed in a two-story opening with flanking Ionic columns. This Classical Revival style building, probably the finest of its style in Greene County, and the least-altered bank building of the period in Paragould, was designed by the Memphis firm of Hankers and Cairns and was built in 1923.

The building was listed on the National Register of Historic Places in 1993.

== See also ==
- National Register of Historic Places listings in Greene County, Arkansas
