= Beisel-Mitchell House =

Historic house in Arkansas, United States

- U.S. National Register of Historic Places
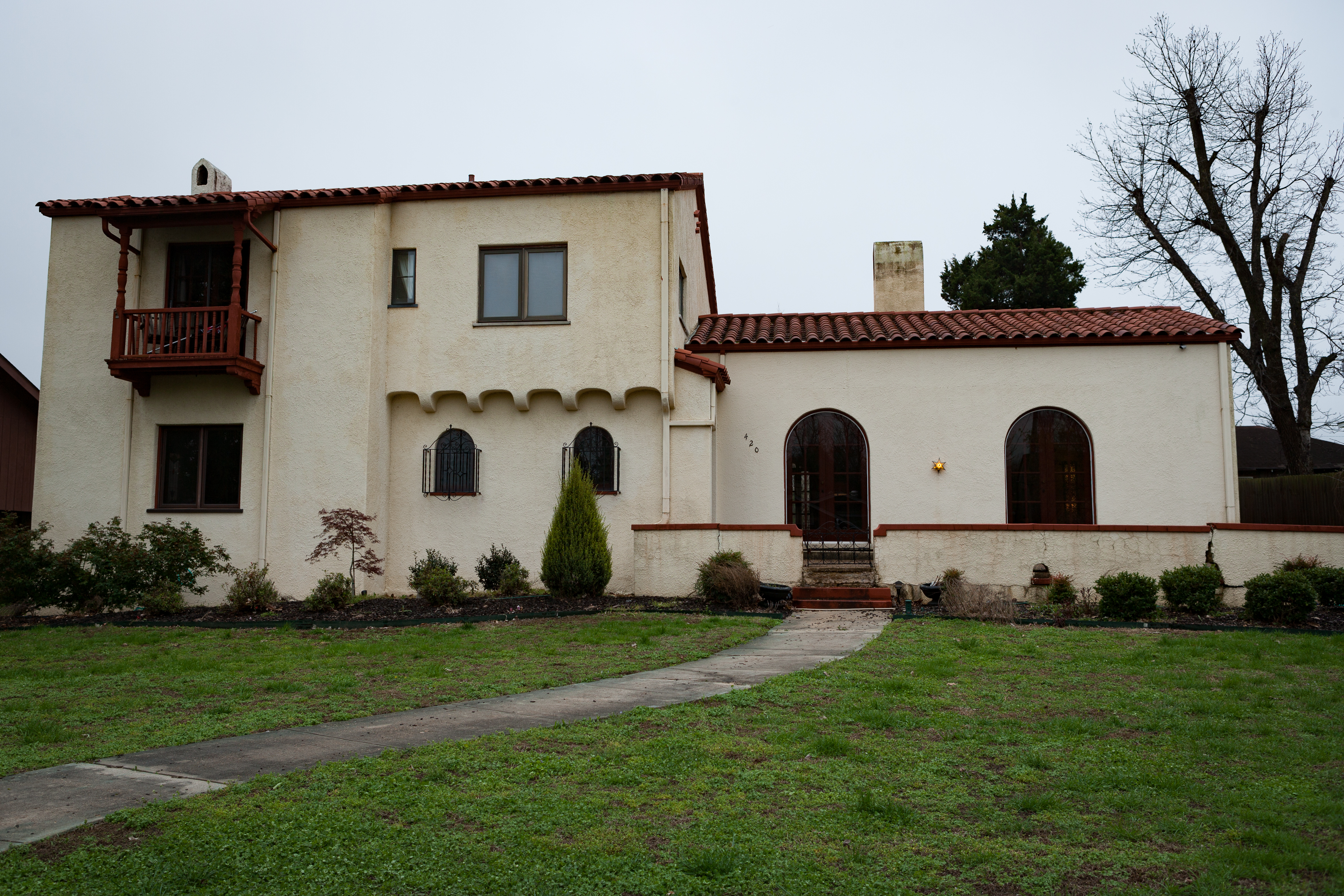

- Location within Arkansas Location within the United States
- Location: 420 W. Court St., Paragould, Arkansas
- Coordinates: 36°3′21″N 90°29′27″W
- Area: less than one acre
- Built: 1930
- Built by: Sax Branum
- Architectural style: Mission/Spanish Revival
- NRHP reference No.: 96001031
- Added to NRHP: September 27, 1996

The Beisel-Mitchell House is a historic house at 420 West Court Street in Paragould, Arkansas. It is a two-story L-shaped Spanish Revival structure with a white stucco exterior, and a low-pitch gable roof clad in red tile. The house was built in 1930 for E. N. Beisel as a wedding present for his wife, and apparently kicked off a minor building boom of similar Spanish Revival houses in the area. It is among the best-preserved and least-altered of those houses.

The house was listed on the National Register of Historic Places in 1996.

== See also ==
- National Register of Historic Places listings in Greene County, Arkansas
