= St. Mary Catholic Church (Helena-West Helena, Arkansas) =

Historic church in Arkansas, United States

- U.S. National Register of Historic Places
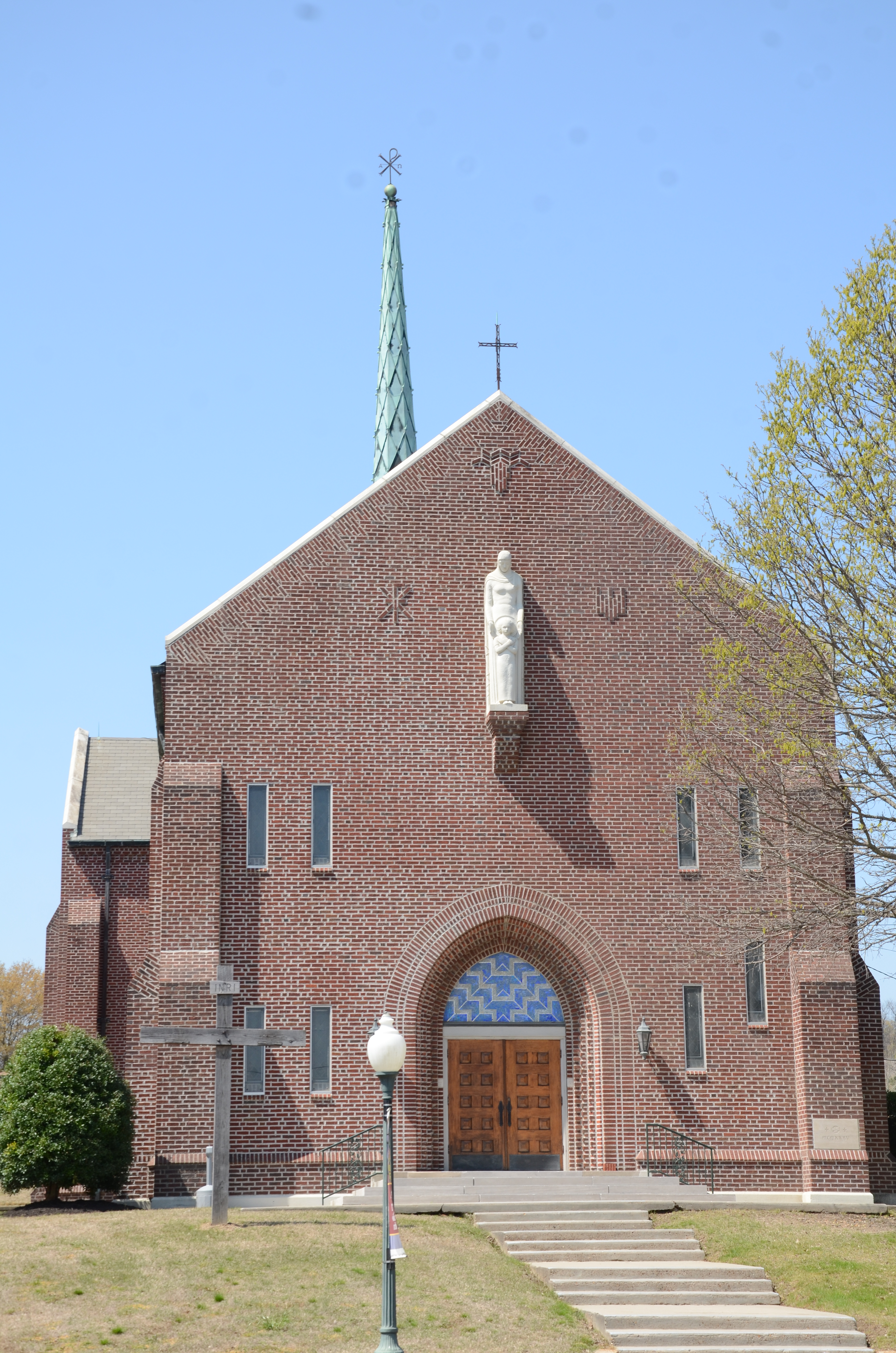

- Location within Arkansas Location within the United States
- Location: 123 Columbia, Helena-West Helena, Arkansas
- Coordinates: 34°31′22″N 90°35′31″W
- Area: less than one acre
- Built: 1936
- Architect: Charles Eames
- Architectural style: Late Gothic Revival
- NRHP reference No.: 06001278
- Added to NRHP: January 24, 2007

St. Mary Church is a Catholic parish in Helena-West Helena, Arkansas, in the North Delta deanery of the Diocese of Little Rock. It is located at 123 Columbia Street.

== History ==
Serious missionary work was undertaken in the early 19th century by the Lazarists. The first Catholic church in Helena was burned down in 1854 by the Know Nothings, replaced with a wood-frame church in 1856. The community did not gain a resident parish priest until July 18, 1858, when Bishop Andrew Byrne, first Bishop of Arkansas, appointed Rev. Patrick Behan.

The parish roll grew as Irish American immigrants settled in the area. In 1857, the Sisters of Charity of Nazareth arrived at the invitation of Bishop Byrne, who purchased 10 acres of land in Helena for them to build a convent and a Catholic school, which would become Sacred Heart Academy.

The school would move to a new building in 1918, but facing declining enrollment after World War II, it closed in 1968. The building was razed in 1973, and the Sisters donated the land to the parish that is now used as the church's parking lot.

The frame church was replaced with a brick church in 1889 near the school, which served the parish until 1934, when construction began on the large brick church which stands today.

St Mary's closed its boarding school in the 1950s and its day school in 1968, and the Sisters of Mercy donated the land to the parish.

== Architecture ==
At the behest of Fr. Thomas Martin, the church was designed by Charles Eames with his partner Robert Walsh in 1934; the team had also designed St. Mary's in Paragould, Arkansas.

Although Renaissance Revival architecture was in vogue at the time, Eames designed this church in a more austere style he believed was typical of churches in the early Christian era. The church is brick, painted dusky rose. The nave is flanked by stained glass windows by Emil Frei. Also notable are the intricate brass hanging lamps, designed by Eames himself, in form of dark globes. The steeple, buttresses, and arches echo Middle European traditions. Behind the sanctuary is a large mural in earth tones painted by Charles F. Quest.

The church was pivotal in Eames' career. The pews may have been his first experience with producing furniture in volume. More importantly, a writeup of the church was published in Architectural Forum, which caught the attention of Eliel Saarinen. Saarinen wrote a congratulatory letter to Eames and offered him a fellowship at Cranbrook Academy of Art to study architecture.

The church was listed on the National Register of Historic Places in 2007.

== See also ==
- National Register of Historic Places listings in Phillips County, Arkansas
