= Old Bethel Methodist Church (Arkansas) =

Historic church in Arkansas, United States

- U.S. National Register of Historic Places
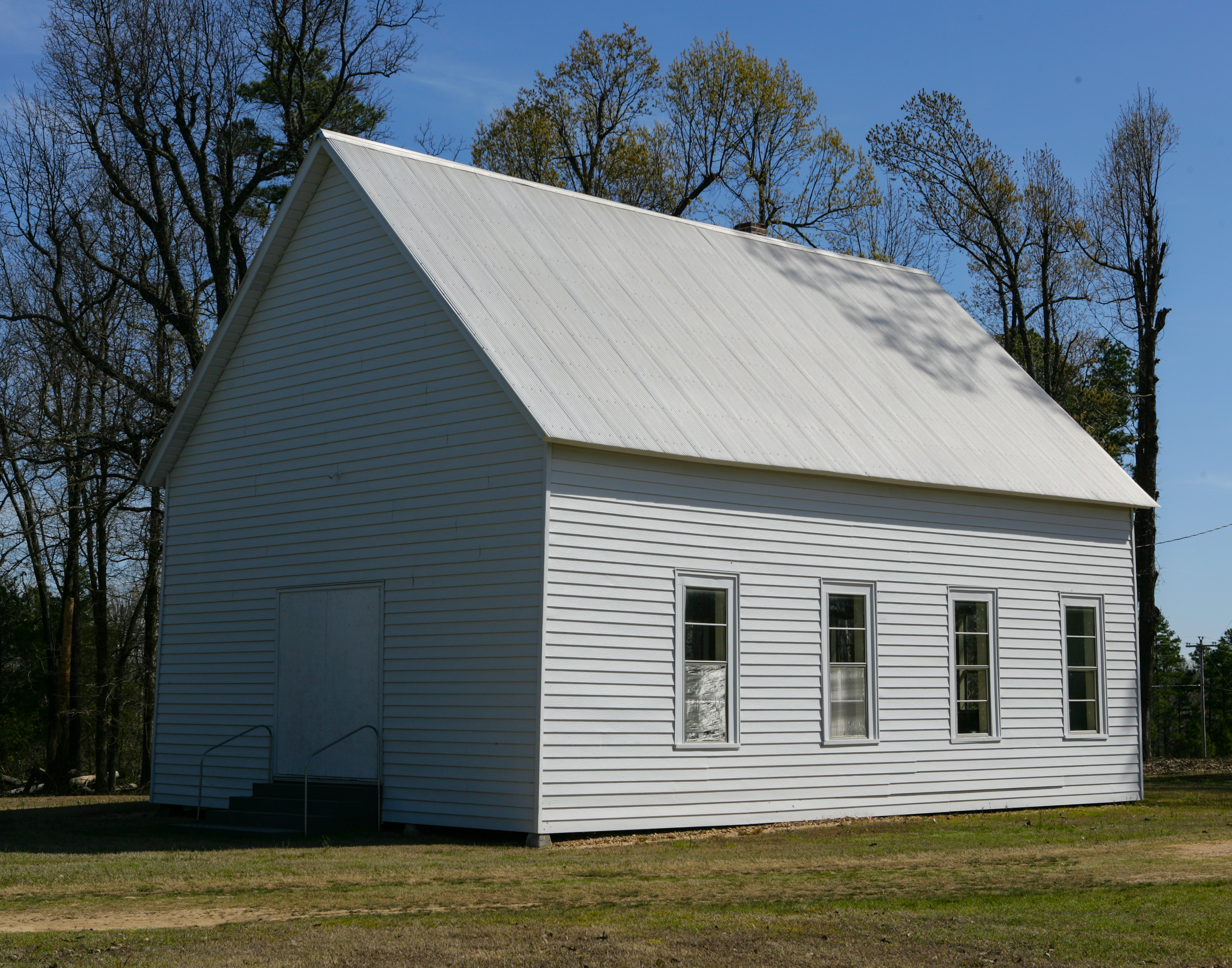

- Location within Arkansas Location within the United States
- Nearest city: Paragould, Arkansas
- Coordinates: 36°0′46″N 90°39′30″W
- Area: 2 acres (0.81 ha)
- Built by: George Russell
- NRHP reference No.: 78000590
- Added to NRHP: April 19, 1978

The Old Bethel Methodist Church, also known as the Old Bethel School, Church, & Cemetery, is a historic Methodist church, school and cemetery in rural Greene County, Arkansas. It is located on Highway 358,& Greene 712 Road in Paragould, Arkansas. It is a modest single-story wood-frame structure, built in 1901, and standing next to a cemetery established in 1882. The original Bethel Methodist Church was constructed in 1880, a small, onestory, white frame church. In 1900, a storm destroyed this building and in 1901 an almost identical building replaced the original structure. George Russell, a local carpenter, built the building using native materials of cypress and pine. It measures 20 feet by 40 feet and has a high pitched roof covered by tin. Exterior walls are covered with six inch beveled pine siding, while interior walls and ceiling are beaded pine wall board. Adjacent to it is a cemetery that dates to 1886. The first person buried here was Moss Widner in 1882. The building served the small community of Finch as not just a church, but also as a school, and was vacated in 1941. It was restored in the 1970s by a group of local concerned citizens, and is occasionally used for services.

The church was listed on the National Register of Historic Places in 1978.

== See also ==
- National Register of Historic Places listings in Greene County, Arkansas
