= James W. Wood =

- Born: August 9, 1924; Paragould, Arkansas, U.S.
- Died: January 1, 1990 (aged 65); Melbourne, Florida, U.S.
- Other name: James Wayne Wood
- Education: Air Force Institute of Technology, B.S. 1954
- Occupation: Test pilot
- Space career

USAF astronaut
- Rank: Colonel, USAF
- Selection: 1960 Dyna-Soar Group 1
- Missions: None

James Wayne Wood (August 9, 1924 – January 1, 1990; Colonel, USAF) was an American aeronautical engineer, U.S. Air Force officer, test pilot, and astronaut in the X-20 Dyna-Soar program.

== Early life and education ==
Wood was born on August 9, 1924, in Paragould, Arkansas. He considered Pueblo, Colorado his home town. Wood earned a Bachelor of Science degree in Aeronautical Engineering from the U.S. Air Force Institute of Technology in 1954. He was married and had three children.

== Test pilot ==
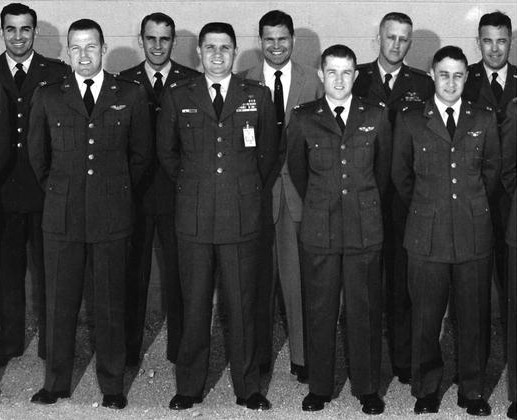
USAF Experimental Flight Test School Class 56D. Front row: Captains Gordon Cooper, James Wood, Jack Mayo and Gus Grissom.

Wood served in the U.S. Army Air Corps during World War II, and flew 10 combat missions. In the Korean War, he flew more than 100 combat missions.

As a USAF Test Pilot School graduate, he was serving as an experimental test pilot at the Air Force Flight Test Center, Edwards AFB, California when selected for the X-20 Dyna-Soar program in April 1960. However, before his selection, he had been an unsuccessful applicant for NASA Astronaut Group 1. Wood was the senior test pilot on the Dyna-Soar project and was slated to be the pilot on its first sub-orbital mission. If the program had not been cancelled, the first drop test would have been in July 1964. After the Dyna-Soar program was cancelled on December 10, 1963, he remained with the U.S. Air Force and served as Commander of Test Operations at Edwards Air Force Base until 1978. He retired from the U.S. Air Force with the rank of colonel. Wood later was test pilot and Director of Operations, Tracor Flight Systems Inc., in Newport Beach, California.

Wood served as the 1975 president of the Society of Experimental Test Pilots and was a Fellow of the organization.

== Death ==
Wood died in Melbourne, Florida, on January 1, 1990, of natural causes, aged 65.
