= Texaco Station No. 1 =

- U.S. National Register of Historic Places
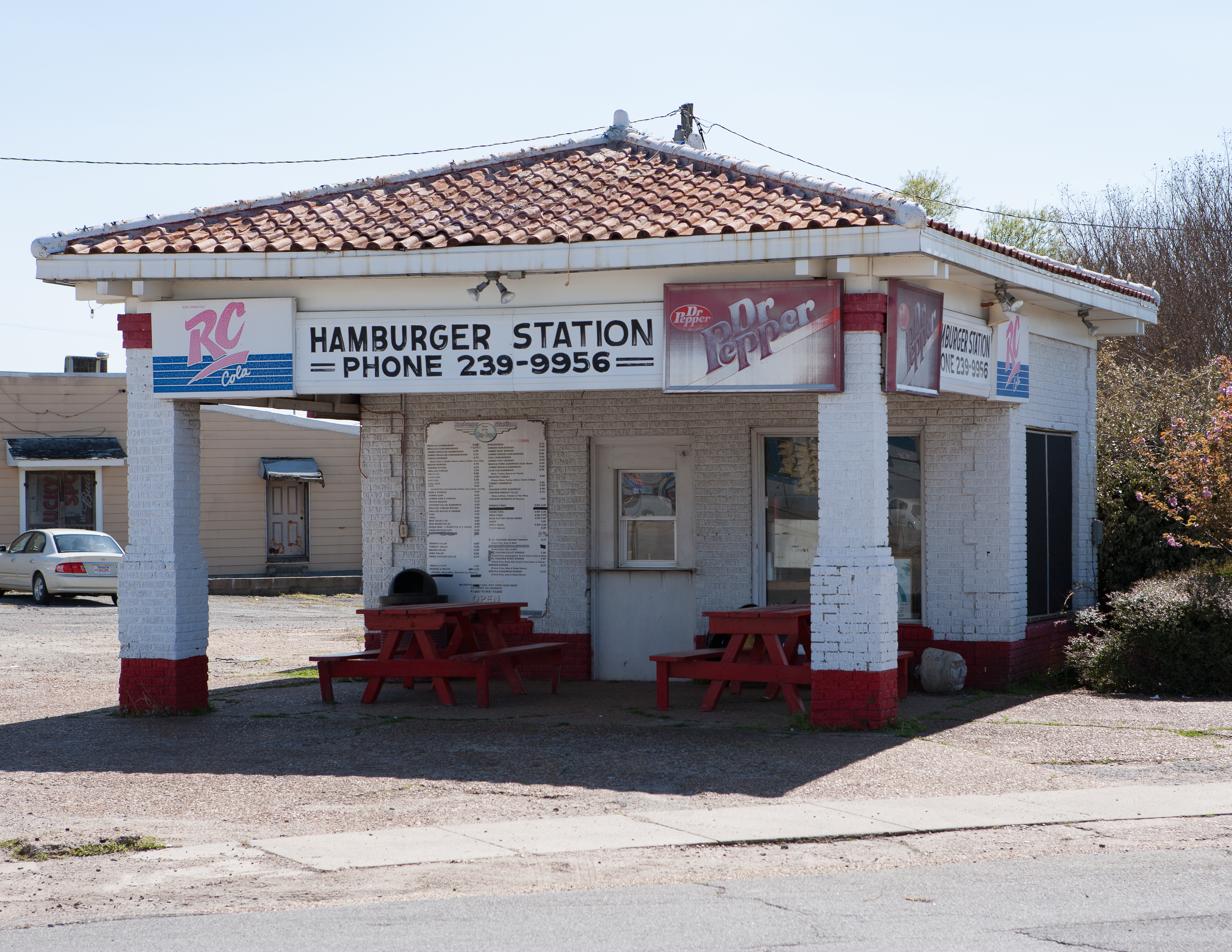

- Location within Arkansas Location within the United States
- Location: 110 E. Main St., Paragould, Arkansas
- Coordinates: 36°3′16″N 90°29′9″W
- Area: less than one acre
- Built: 1924
- Architectural style: Mission/Spanish Revival
- MPS: Arkansas Highway History and Architecture MPS
- NRHP reference No.: 01000718
- Added to NRHP: July 20, 2001

The Texaco Station No. 1 is a historic automotive service station at 110 East Main Street in Paragould, Arkansas. Built in 1925, it is a Mission-style brick building with a canopy extending to cover the service area. It is one of only two surviving early gas stations in the city, and was used as a service station until about 1970, going through a number of ownership and fuel supplier changes. In 1985 it was converted into the Hamburger Station, a restaurant.

The station was listed on the National Register of Historic Places in 2001.

== See also ==
- National Register of Historic Places listings in Greene County, Arkansas
