= National Register of Historic Places listings in Greene County, Arkansas =

Location of Greene County in Arkansas

This is a list of the National Register of Historic Places listings in Greene County, Arkansas.

This is intended to be a complete list of the properties and districts on the National Register of Historic Places in Greene County, Arkansas, United States. The locations of National Register properties and districts for which the latitude and longitude coordinates are included below, may be seen in a map.

There are 18 properties and districts listed on the National Register in the county.

Contents: Counties in Arkansas
- Arkansas
- Ashley
- Baxter
- Benton
- Boone
- Bradley
- Calhoun
- Carroll
- Chicot
- Clark
- Clay
- Cleburne
- Cleveland
- Columbia
- Conway
- Craighead
- Crawford
- Crittenden
- Cross
- Dallas
- Desha
- Drew
- Faulkner
- Franklin
- Fulton
- Garland
- Grant
- Greene
- Hempstead
- Hot Spring
- Howard
- Independence
- Izard
- Jackson
- Jefferson
- Johnson
- Lafayette
- Lawrence
- Lee
- Lincoln
- Little River
- Logan
- Lonoke
- Madison
- Marion
- Miller
- Mississippi
- Monroe
- Montgomery
- Nevada
- Newton
- Ouachita
- Perry
- Phillips
- Pike
- Poinsett
- Polk
- Pope
- Prairie
- Pulaski (Little Rock)
- Randolph
- St. Francis
- Saline
- Scott
- Searcy
- Sebastian
- Sevier
- Sharp
- Stone
- Union
- Van Buren
- Washington
- White
- Woodruff
- Yell

This National Park Service list is complete through NPS recent listings posted December 19, 2025.

== Current listings ==
	Name on the Register	Image	Date listed	Location	City or town	Description
1	Beisel-Mitchell House	Beisel-Mitchell House	September 27, 1996 (#96001031)	420 W. Court St. 36°03′21″N 90°29′27″W	Paragould	
2	Crowley's Ridge State Park-Bathhouse	Crowley's Ridge State Park-Bathhouse	May 28, 1992 (#92000537)	Main service center area access road in Crowley's Ridge State Park; 36°02′45″N 90°39′50″W	Walcott	
3	Crowley's Ridge State Park-Bridge	Crowley's Ridge State Park-Bridge	May 28, 1992 (#92000540)	Main service center area access road in Crowley's Ridge State Park; 36°02′42″N 90°39′47″W	Walcott	
4	Crowley's Ridge State Park-Comfort Station	Crowley's Ridge State Park-Comfort Station	May 28, 1992 (#92000538)	Campground and cabin area access road in Crowley's Ridge State Park; 36°02′37″N 90°39′37″W	Walcott	
5	Crowley's Ridge State Park-Dining Hall	Crowley's Ridge State Park-Dining Hall	May 28, 1992 (#92000536)	Employee housing area access road in Crowley's Ridge State Park; 36°02′59″N 90°39′48″W	Walcott	
6	George Ray's Dragstrip	George Ray's Dragstrip	February 21, 2006 (#06000075)	Highway 135, 0.5 miles south of U.S. Route 412; 36°02′50″N 90°26′04″W	Paragould	
7	Greene County Courthouse	Greene County Courthouse	August 11, 1976 (#76000412)	Court Sq. 36°03′14″N 90°29′12″W	Paragould	
8	Gulf Oil Company Service Station	Gulf Oil Company Service Station	August 16, 1994 (#94000850)	Southeastern corner of the junction of Main and S. 3rd Sts. 36°03′15″N 90°29′17″W	Paragould	
9	Highfill-McClure House	Highfill-McClure House	March 28, 2002 (#02000260)	701 W. Highland St. 36°03′28″N 90°29′40″W	Paragould	
10	Jackson-Herget House	Jackson-Herget House	July 24, 1992 (#92000907)	206 S. 4th St. 36°03′18″N 90°29′26″W	Paragould	
11	Linwood Mausoleum	Linwood Mausoleum	January 29, 2007 (#06001314)	Junction of W. Kingshighway and Linwood Dr. 36°03′04″N 90°30′11″W	Paragould	
12	National Bank of Commerce Building	National Bank of Commerce Building	May 14, 1993 (#93000423)	200 S. Pruett St. 36°03′19″N 90°29′11″W	Paragould	
13	Old Bethel Methodist Church	Old Bethel Methodist Church	April 19, 1978 (#78000590)	West of Paragould off Highway 141; 36°00′46″N 90°39′30″W	Paragould	
14	Paragould Downtown Commercial Historic District	Paragould Downtown Commercial Historic District	July 18, 2003 (#03000646)	Roughly bounded by 3rd Ave., Kings Highway, 3½ St., and W. Highland St. 36°03′19″N 90°29′13″W	Paragould	
15	Paragould War Memorial	Paragould War Memorial	June 20, 1997 (#97000554)	Junction of 3rd and Court Sts. 36°03′21″N 90°29′20″W	Paragould	
16	St. Mary's Catholic Church	St. Mary's Catholic Church	January 27, 2015 (#14001198)	301 W. Highland; 36°03′30″N 90°29′16″W	Paragould	
17	Standard Oil Company Oil Station Garage Building		September 16, 2022 (#100008154)	202 West Vine St. 36°03′05″N 90°29′17″W	Paragould	
18	Texaco Station No. 1	Texaco Station No. 1	July 20, 2001 (#01000718)	110 E. Main St. 36°03′16″N 90°29′09″W	Paragould	

== Former listings ==
	Name on the Register	Image	Date listed	Date removed	Location	City or town	Description
1	Big Slough Ditch Bridge		June 9, 2000 (#00000629)	September 24, 2004	County Road 855	Brighton vicinity	
2	Eight Mile Creek Bridge	Eight Mile Creek Bridge	April 6, 1990 (#90000524)	September 24, 2004	AR 135	Paragould vicinity	Replaced in 2001.

== See also ==
- List of National Historic Landmarks in Arkansas
- National Register of Historic Places listings in Arkansas
