= Mount Holly Mausoleum =

United States historic place in Arkansas

- U.S. National Register of Historic Places
- U.S. Historic district – Contributing property
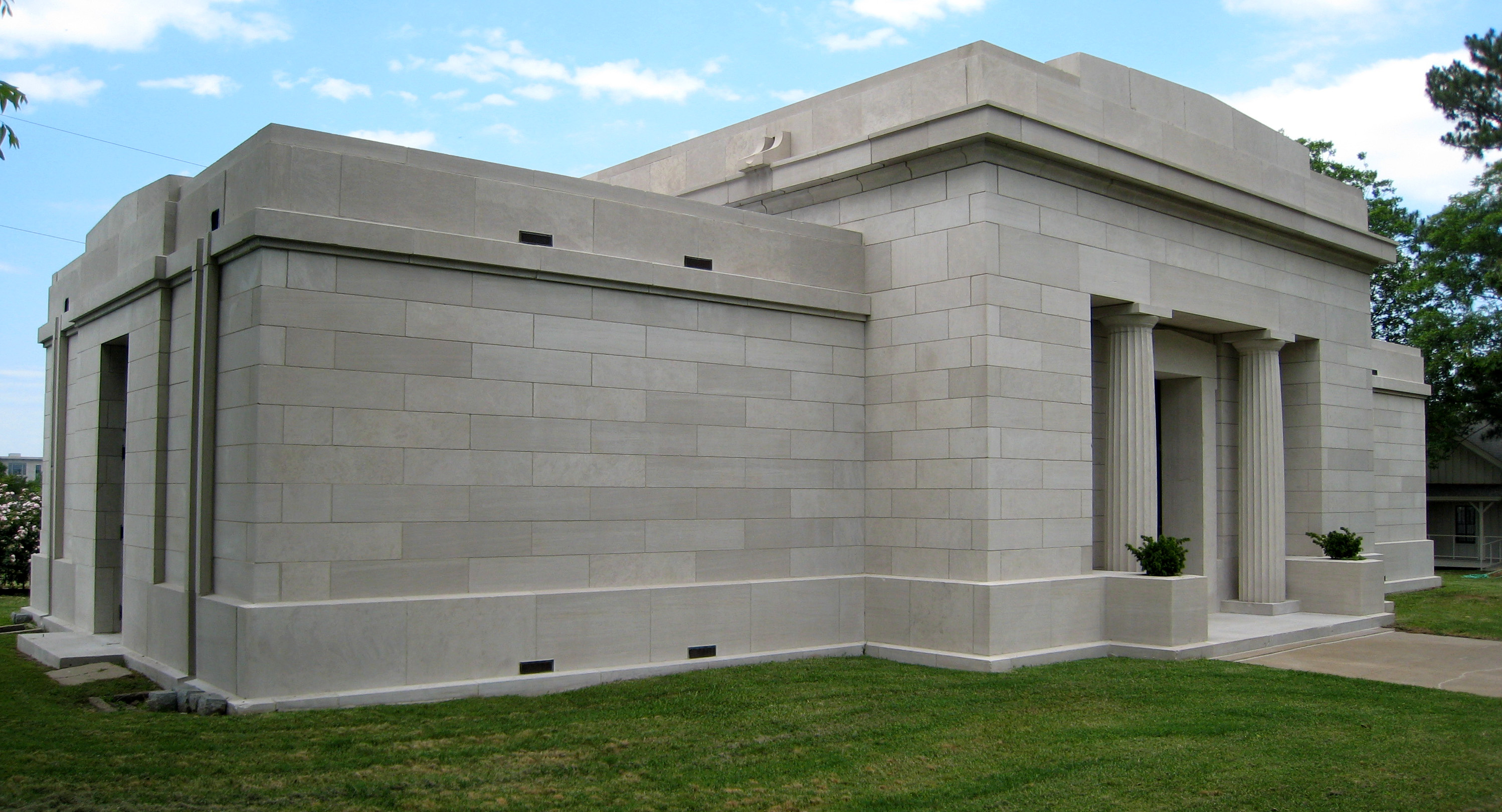
- Mount Holly Mausoleum

- Location within Arkansas Location within the United States
- Location: Mount Holly Cemetery, 12th and Broadway, Little Rock, Arkansas
- Coordinates: 34°44′19.91″N 92°16′44.23″W
- Area: less than one acre
- Built: 1917
- Architect: Thompson and Harding
- Architectural style: Greek Revival, Classical Revival
- Part of: Mount Holly Cemetery (ID82000912)
- MPS: Thompson, Charles L., Design Collection TR
- NRHP reference No.: 82000912

Significant dates
- Added to NRHP: December 22, 1982
- Designated CP: March 5, 1970

The Mount Holly Mausoleum was designed by architects Thompson and Harding in 1917 and is located in Little Rock, Arkansas. Its architectural significance lies in its austerity of simple Greek Revival design. The structure was added to the National Register of Historic Places in 1982. The mausoleum is located in the northwest corner of Little Rock's oldest and most picturesque cemetery, Mount Holly (which is also listed in the National Register of Historic Places).

Constructed of limestone, the building is composed of a central entrance block flanked by two smaller wings. The entrance is framed by two fluted Doric columns which have been set back into the structure and are flush with the outside wall. A simple cornice with cavetto molding wraps the entire central block; the simple parapet rises slightly higher over the entrance. The entrance features two double doors with multi paned leaded glass cames (grooved strips that hold together the panes) embellished with a laurel wreath motif in stained glass. Additionally, stained glass windows with predominant tones of gold, green, and lavender appear flanking the door and in the transom as well as at the rear of the main block.

== See also ==
- Linwood Mausoleum: NRHP listing in Paragould, Arkansas
- National Register of Historic Places listings in Little Rock, Arkansas
