= Dave's Texaco =

- Dave’s Texaco
- U.S. National Register of Historic Places
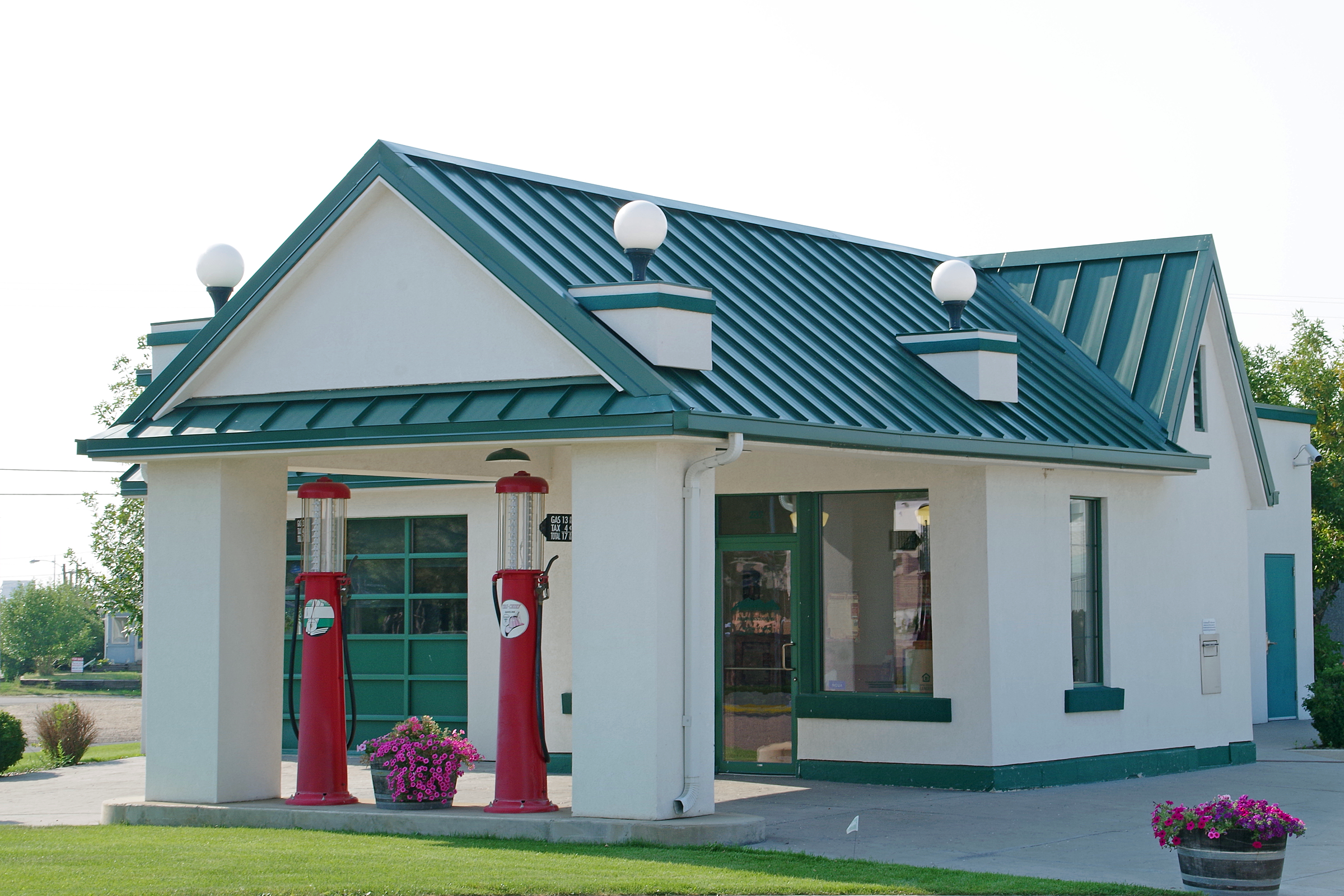

- Location within Montana Location within the United States
- Location: 237 Pennsylvania St., Chinook, Montana
- Coordinates: 48°35′35″N 109°13′54″W
- Built: 1927
- MPS: Roadside Architecture Along US 2 in Montana MPS
- NRHP reference No.: 94000862
- Added to NRHP: August 16, 1994

Dave's Texaco is a site on the National Register of Historic Places located in Chinook, Montana. It was added to the Register on August 16, 1994. The building was a gas station and has also been known as Dave's Exxon and as Dave's Conoco. The building is made of stucco on a concrete foundation and with an metal roof.

It was built in 1927 on U.S. Route 2 which has since been rerouted two blocks away. It sold Texaco products exclusively until 1978 when Texaco ceased doing business in Montana. Its third owner, David Sprinkle, operated the business from 1938 until at least 1993.

== See also ==
- Deerfield Texaco Service Station, 1923 station in Deerfield, Kansas
