= Deerfield Texaco Service Station =

- U.S. National Register of Historic Places
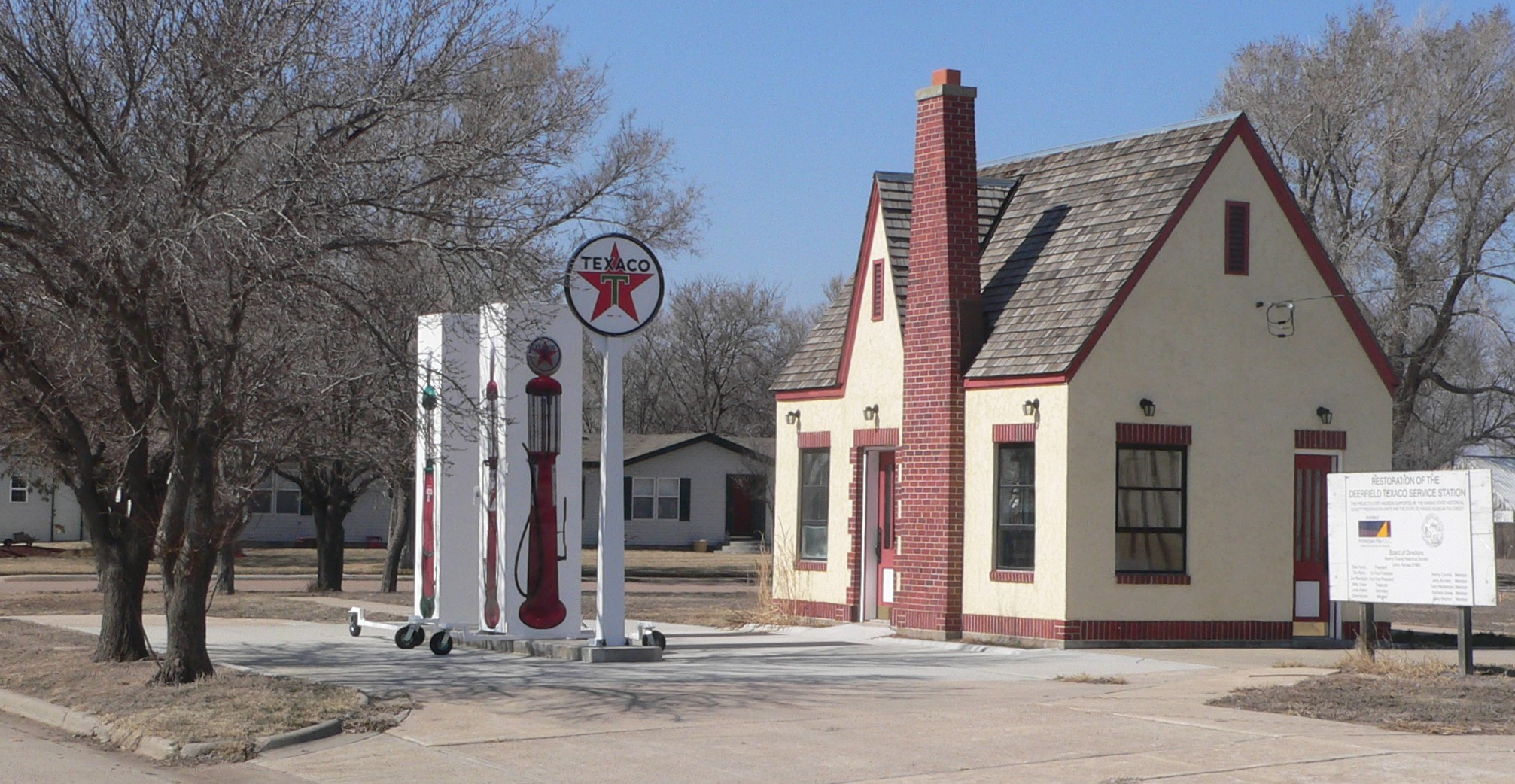

- Location within Kansas Location within the United States
- Location: 105 W. 6th., Deerfield, Kansas
- Coordinates: 37.979632°N 101.134216°W
- Area: less than one acre
- Built: 1923
- Architectural style: Tudor Revival
- NRHP reference No.: 07000603
- Added to NRHP: June 27, 2007

The Deerfield Texaco Service Station, at 105 W. 6th in Deerfield, Kansas, is a historic one-story service station built in 1923 on the old U.S. Highway 50. It was deemed significant for association with economic development and transportation in Deerfield, and for its Tudor Revival architecture.

It was listed on the National Register of Historic Places in 2007.

== See also ==
- Dave's Texaco, service station in Chinook, Montana
