= Greene County Courthouse (Arkansas) =

- U.S. National Register of Historic Places
- U.S. Historic district – Contributing property
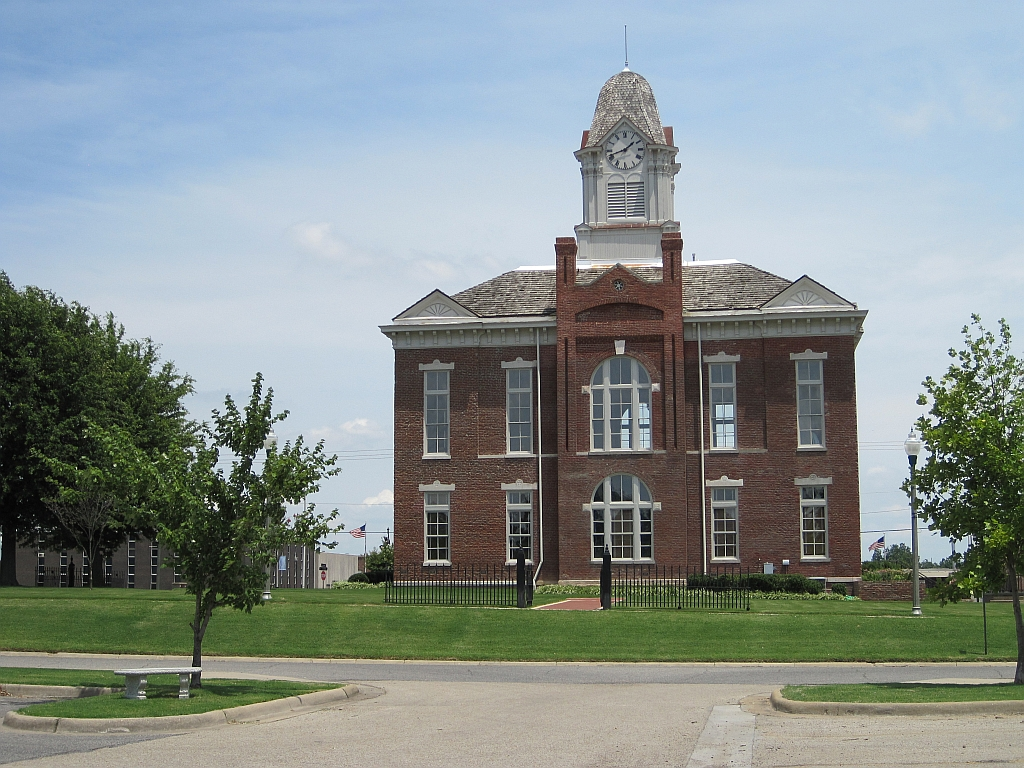

- Location within Arkansas Location within the United States
- Location: Courtsquare, Paragould, Arkansas
- Coordinates: 36°3′14″N 90°29′12″W
- Area: less than one acre
- Built: 1888
- Architect: J.E. Shane
- Architectural style: Georgian Revival
- Part of: Paragould Downtown Commercial Historic District (ID03000646)
- NRHP reference No.: 76000412

Significant dates
- Added to NRHP: August 11, 1976
- Designated CP: July 18, 2003

The former Greene County Courthouse is located at Courthouse Square in the center of Paragould, the county seat of Greene County, Arkansas. It is a large two-story Georgian Revival structure, built out of red brick. It has a low-pitch hip roof with small gables at three corners, as well as above the entrances. The roof is topped by a square tower with a clock and belfry, topped by an ogee roof and spire. It was built in 1887, and was the sixth courthouse built for the county, most of the others having been destroyed by fire.

The building was listed on the National Register of Historic Places in 1976. The current county courthouse is next door to the historic building, at 320 West Court Street; it was built in 1997.

== See also ==
- National Register of Historic Places listings in Greene County, Arkansas
