= Paragould, Arkansas =

- City
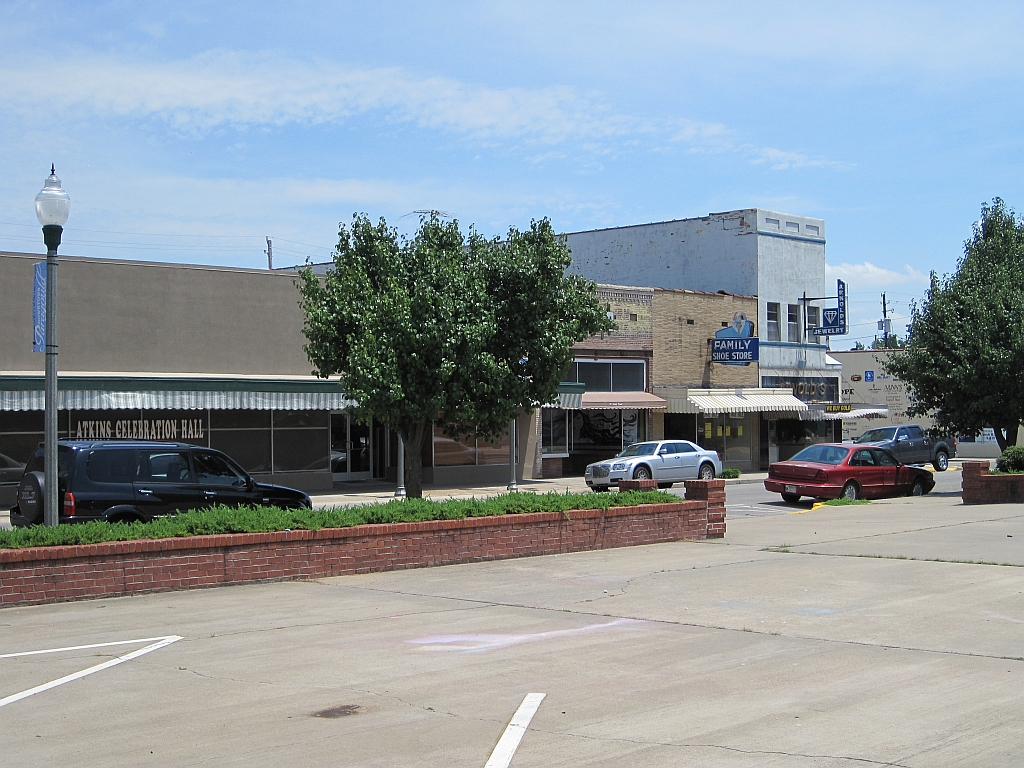
- South Pruett Street in Paragould

- Flag

- Location of Paragould in Greene County, Arkansas.

- Location in the United States
- Coordinates: 36°03′25″N 90°30′21″W
- Country: United States
- State: Arkansas
- County: Greene

Area
  - Total: 32.02 sq mi (82.93 km^{2})
  - Land: 31.86 sq mi (82.51 km^{2})
  - Water: 0.16 sq mi (0.42 km^{2})
- Elevation: 289 ft (88 m)

Population (2020)
  - Total: 29,537
  - Estimate (2025): 31,135 ▲
  - Density: 927.2/sq mi (357.99/km^{2})
- Time zone: UTC−6 (Central (CST))
  - Summer (DST): UTC−5 (CDT)
- ZIP codes: 72450-72451
- Area code: 870
- FIPS code: 05-53390
- GNIS feature ID: 2404471
- Website: cityofparagould.com

Paragould is a city in and the county seat of Greene County, and the 15th-largest city in Arkansas, in the United States. The city is located in northeastern Arkansas on the eastern edge of Crowley's Ridge, a geologic anomaly contained within the Arkansas Delta.

Paragould is the principal city of the Paragould, Arkansas Micropolitan Statistical Area and is also a part of the Jonesboro-Paragould Combined Statistical Area. The population of Paragould was 29,537 as of the 2020 Census, compared to 26,113 at the 2010 census.

== History ==
The city's name is a blend combining the last names of competing railroad magnates J. W. Paramore and Jay Gould. Paramore's Texas & St. Louis Railway (later the Cotton Belt) and Gould's St. Louis, Iron Mountain and Southern Railway (later the Missouri Pacific) intersected here in 1882. A group of citizens chose the name, and it is believed to be the only city in the world with this name. For a time, Gould objected to his name's being second and refused to list the new town on his schedules. In 1888, Paragould was the starting point for the Paragould and Buffalo Island Railway (later the Paragould Southeastern Railway), which eventually made its way to Blytheville, Arkansas.

=== Sundown town ===
From 1888 to 1908, Paragould experienced a series of incidents in which White residents threatened and attacked Black residents. Some Black residents were flogged, and some of their homes and churches were burned. Arkansas Governor Jeff Davis ordered the state militia not to intervene on behalf of Black citizens. On numerous occasions White residents ordered Black citizens to leave and never return. In 1908, they threatened them to leave or die, which resulted in an almost complete depopulation of African-Americans in the county, and earned Paragould the designation of a sundown town. Black children were not allowed to participate in any form of public education until 1948, and then by busing them out of the county to Booker T. Washington High School in Jonesboro. In 1957, facing mandated integration, Jonesboro terminated this practice. Prior to 1982, no hotel in Paragould would allow Black people to spend the night. In 1983, when two Black Union Pacific workers attempted to eat at a restaurant, they were locked out. When police reached the scene, they accused the workers of attempting to break into the restaurant. An informal ban on hiring African-Americans was alleged to exist in Paragould until at least 2002.

== Geography ==
Paragould is located southeast of the middle of Greene County. U.S. Routes 412 and 49 intersect in the city west of downtown. US 412 leads east 9 miles (14 km) to the Missouri state line at the St. Francis River, and a further 23 miles (37 km) northeast to Kennett, Missouri; to the west US 412 leads 26 miles (42 km) to Walnut Ridge. US 49 leads northeast 32 miles (51 km) to Piggott and southwest 20 miles (32 km) to Jonesboro. The closest major city is Memphis, Tennessee, 82 miles (132 km) to the southeast.

According to the United States Census Bureau, the city has a total area of 31.4 square miles (81.2 km^{2}), of which 31.2 square miles (80.8 km^{2}) is land and 0.2 square miles (0.4 km^{2}), or 0.52%, is water.

=== Climate ===
Paragould has a humid subtropical climate (Köppen climate classification Cfa).

Climate data for Paragould, Arkansas (1991–2020 normals, extremes 1979–present (Note: PARAGOULD 1892–1979, PARAGOULD 1 S 1979–PRESENT))
Month	Jan	Feb	Mar	Apr	May	Jun	Jul	Aug	Sep	Oct	Nov	Dec	Year
Record high °F (°C)	76 (24)	83 (28)	89 (32)	93 (34)	98 (37)	105 (41)	108 (42)	105 (41)	102 (39)	95 (35)	84 (29)	77 (25)	106 (41)
Mean maximum °F (°C)	66.0 (18.9)	70.2 (21.2)	77.1 (25.1)	83.7 (28.7)	89.2 (31.8)	94.9 (34.9)	97.0 (36.1)	97.0 (36.1)	93.1 (33.9)	86.4 (30.2)	76.4 (24.7)	67.3 (19.6)	98.4 (36.9)
Mean daily maximum °F (°C)	45.7 (7.6)	50.4 (10.2)	59.5 (15.3)	70.2 (21.2)	78.9 (26.1)	87.3 (30.7)	89.8 (32.1)	88.9 (31.6)	83.1 (28.4)	72.6 (22.6)	59.0 (15.0)	48.7 (9.3)	69.5 (20.8)
Daily mean °F (°C)	37.0 (2.8)	40.9 (4.9)	49.6 (9.8)	59.8 (15.4)	69.1 (20.6)	77.5 (25.3)	80.4 (26.9)	79.0 (26.1)	72.3 (22.4)	61.1 (16.2)	49.0 (9.4)	40.2 (4.6)	59.7 (15.4)
Mean daily minimum °F (°C)	28.2 (−2.1)	31.4 (−0.3)	39.7 (4.3)	49.3 (9.6)	59.3 (15.2)	67.8 (19.9)	71.0 (21.7)	69.1 (20.6)	61.5 (16.4)	49.6 (9.8)	39.0 (3.9)	31.7 (−0.2)	49.8 (9.9)
Mean minimum °F (°C)	13.2 (−10.4)	17.3 (−8.2)	24.1 (−4.4)	35.2 (1.8)	46.2 (7.9)	58.1 (14.5)	64.1 (17.8)	61.5 (16.4)	48.8 (9.3)	35.5 (1.9)	25.5 (−3.6)	18.0 (−7.8)	10.0 (−12.2)
Record low °F (°C)	−14 (−26)	−13 (−25)	5 (−15)	14 (−10)	34 (1)	46 (8)	49 (9)	48 (9)	30 (−1)	20 (−7)	7 (−14)	−6 (−21)	−14 (−26)
Average precipitation inches (mm)	3.89 (99)	4.03 (102)	4.88 (124)	5.19 (132)	5.14 (131)	3.56 (90)	4.24 (108)	3.84 (98)	3.31 (84)	4.40 (112)	4.64 (118)	4.62 (117)	51.74 (1,314)
Average snowfall inches (cm)	1.0 (2.5)	0.8 (2.0)	0.4 (1.0)	0.0 (0.0)	0.0 (0.0)	0.0 (0.0)	0.0 (0.0)	0.0 (0.0)	0.0 (0.0)	0.0 (0.0)	0.0 (0.0)	0.3 (0.76)	2.5 (6.4)
Average precipitation days (≥ 0.01 in)	10.0	9.4	11.3	10.4	11.4	8.8	8.9	8.6	6.9	8.7	9.8	11.2	115.4
Average snowy days (≥ 0.1 in)	0.6	0.6	0.2	0.0	0.0	0.0	0.0	0.0	0.0	0.0	0.0	0.5	1.9
Source: NOAA

== Demographics ==
Historical population
Census	Pop.	Note	%±
1890	1,666		—
1900	3,324		99.5%
1910	5,248		57.9%
1920	6,306		20.2%
1930	5,966		−5.4%
1940	7,079		18.7%
1950	9,668		36.6%
1960	9,947		2.9%
1970	10,639		7.0%
1980	15,248		43.3%
1990	18,540		21.6%
2000	22,017		18.8%
2010	26,113		18.6%
2020	29,537		13.1%
2025 (est.)	31,135	▲	5.4%
U.S. Decennial Census

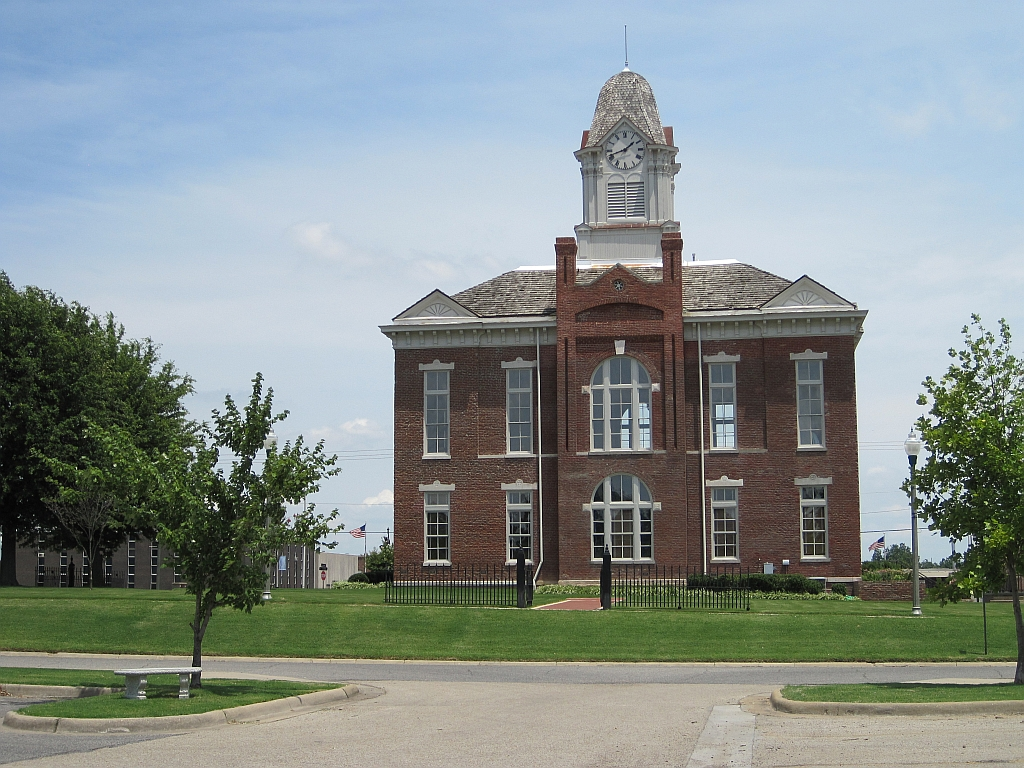
The former Greene County Courthouse is one of twelve sites in Paragould listed on the National Register of Historic Places.

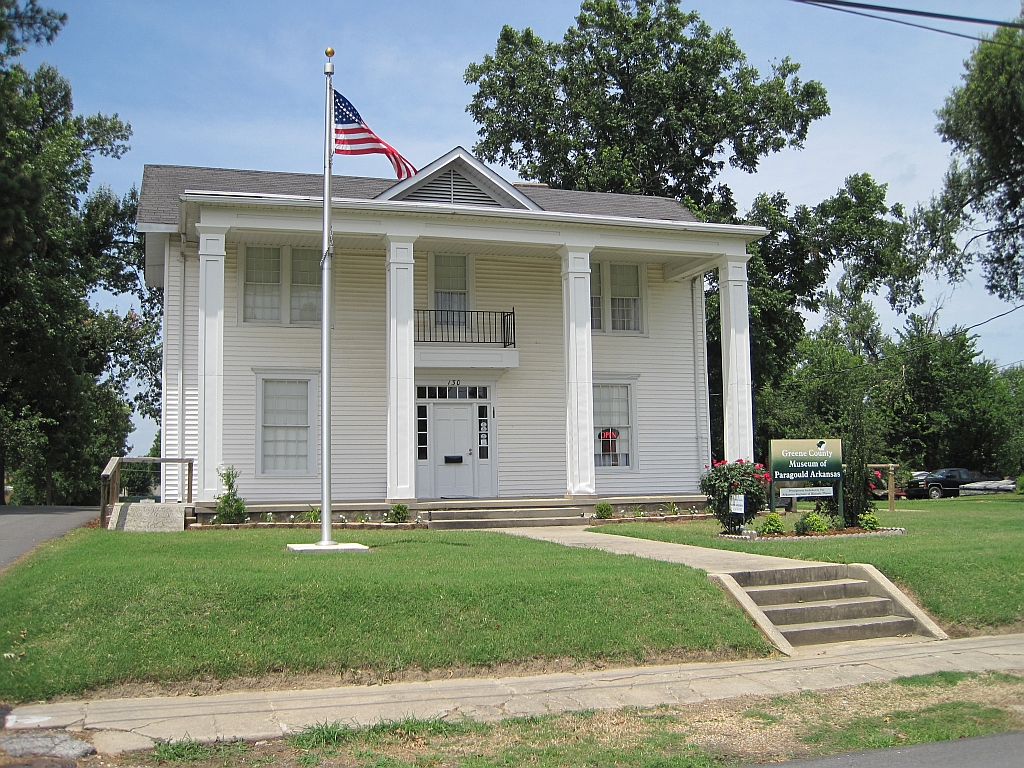
Greene County Museum

=== 2020 census ===
As of the 2020 census, Paragould had a population of 29,537. The median age was 36.3 years. 25.4% of residents were under the age of 18 and 16.2% of residents were 65 years of age or older. For every 100 females there were 93.7 males, and for every 100 females age 18 and over there were 90.2 males age 18 and over.

84.6% of residents lived in urban areas, while 15.4% lived in rural areas.

There were 11,327 households and 7,439 families in Paragould; 34.1% had children under the age of 18 living in them. Of all households, 46.1% were married-couple households, 17.0% were households with a male householder and no spouse or partner present, and 28.8% were households with a female householder and no spouse or partner present. About 27.7% of all households were made up of individuals and 12.2% had someone living alone who was 65 years of age or older.

There were 12,198 housing units, of which 7.1% were vacant. The homeowner vacancy rate was 2.5% and the rental vacancy rate was 7.7%.

Racial composition as of the 2020 census
Race	Number	Percentage
White	25,862	87.6%
Black or African American	877	3.0%
American Indian and Alaska Native	123	0.4%
Asian	156	0.5%
Native Hawaiian and Other Pacific Islander	285	1.0%
Some other race	576	2.0%
Two or more races	1,658	5.6%
Hispanic or Latino (of any race)	1,295	4.4%

=== 2010 census ===
As of the 2010 United States census, there were 26,113 people living in the city. The racial makeup of the city was 94.4% White, 0.8% Black, 0.4% Native American, 0.3% Asian, <0.1% Pacific Islander, <0.1% from some other race and 1.2% from two or more races. 2.8% were Hispanic or Latino of any race.

=== 2000 census ===
As of the census of 2000, there were 22,017 people, 8,941 households, and 6,133 families living in the city. The population density was 714.6 inhabitants per square mile (275.9/km^{2}). There were 9,789 housing units at an average density of 317.7 per square mile (122.7/km^{2}). The racial makeup of the city was 97.9% White, <0.1% Black or African American, 0.4% Native American, 0.2% Asian, <0.1% Pacific Islander, 0.6% from other races, and 0.9% from two or more races. 1.3% of the population were Hispanic or Latino of any race.

There were 8,941 households, out of which 31.9% had children under the age of 18 living with them, 53.7% were married couples living together, 11.4% had a female householder with no husband present, and 31.4% were non-families. 27.5% of all households were made up of individuals, and 13.0% had someone living alone who was 65 years of age or older. The average household size was 2.40 and the average family size was 2.92.

In the city, the population was spread out, with 24.8% under the age of 18, 9.6% from 18 to 24, 28.0% from 25 to 44, 21.7% from 45 to 64, and 15.8% who were 65 years of age or older. The median age was 36 years. For every 100 females, there were 90.7 males. For every 100 females age 18 and over, there were 86.9 males.

The median income for a household in the city was $30,815, and the median income for a family was $39,431. Males had a median income of $28,103 versus $20,623 for females. The per capita income for the city was $18,076. About 8.4% of families and 12.0% of the population were below the poverty line, including 12.1% of those under age 18 and 12.1% of those age 65 or over.

== Government and infrastructure ==
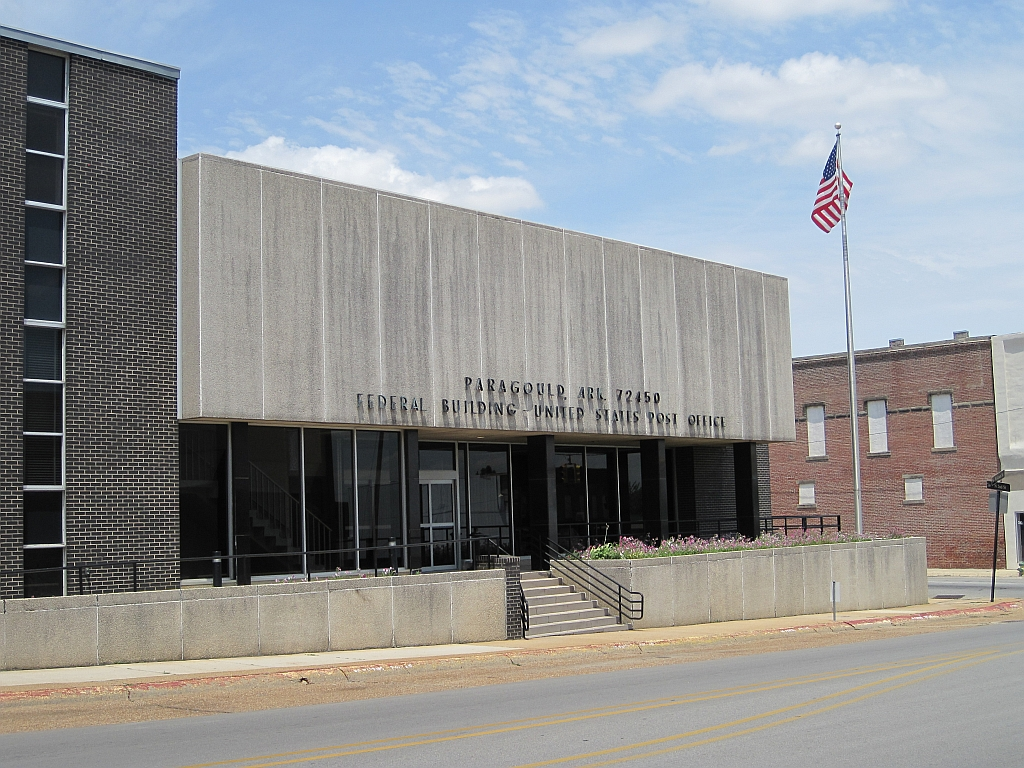
Federal Building and Post Office

Paragould is governed by a mayor and city council. Other city offices include an attorney, treasurer, and chief administrative officer. A city clerk records government activity and is a point of contact for citizens, while various boards and commissions assist with governmental functions.

The city's primary utility provider is Paragould Municipal Utilities. Its formerly used City Light and Water Building from 1938 faced demolition, but has been repurposed as an event venue.

== Education ==
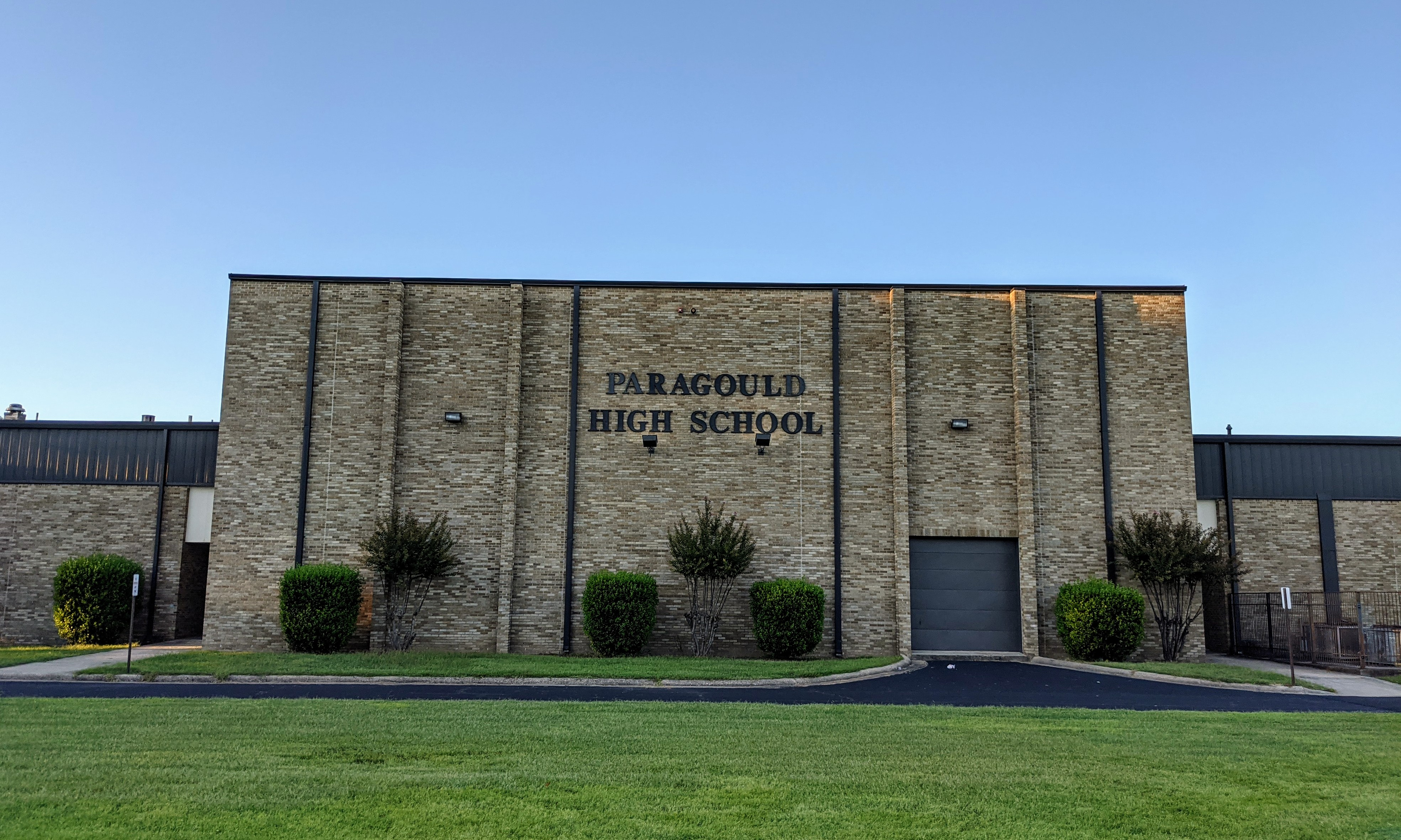
Paragould High School

Paragould is home to Crowley's Ridge College, and a campus of Black River Technical College.

Paragould has two public school districts serving different parts of the city: the Greene County Tech School District and the Paragould School District. It also has Crowley's Ridge Academy and St. Mary's Catholic School private school systems.

The Northeast Arkansas School District was formed on July 1, 1985, by the merger of the former Paragould School District with the Oak Grove School District. By 1997 the name of the new district became the Paragould School District.

== Television ==
KPMF-LD, a MyNetworkTV/Quest affiliated TV station serving the Jonesboro and Memphis markets, and owned by HC2 Holdings.

K17LV-D, translator station of ABC/NBC/CW+ affiliated station KAIT in Jonesboro, and owned by Atlanta-based Gray Television.

== Infrastructure ==
=== Transportation ===
==== Highways ====
- US 49
- U.S. Route 49B
- U.S. Highway 412
- Arkansas Highway 1
- Arkansas Highway 69
- Arkansas Highway 135
- Arkansas Highway 358

=== Health care ===
Arkansas Methodist Medical Center is Paragould's only hospital. The 127-bed acute-care hospital's campus includes a professional office building with a community wellness center.

=== Law enforcement ===
On December 15, 2012, it was announced that "beginning in 2013, the department would deploy a new street crimes unit to high crime areas on foot to take back the streets." The remaining town hall meetings to inform the public of the new plan were cancelled due to the volume of threats received as a result of national media exposure. This was done for public safety, as continuing to hold the meetings may have posed a danger to attendees. The planned unit was not deployed.

== Cultural appearances ==
The documentary short film Udaan (2021) was made by Pakistani film maker Amman Abbasi about Baneen Khan, a female Pakistani student from Karachi enrolling at Black River Technical College.

== Notable people ==
- Weldon Bowlin, Major League Baseball player
- Jeanne Carmen, actress, glamour girl and trick-shot golfer
- Iris DeMent, singer-songwriter
- Van Des Autels, film actor, radio announcer and TV news anchor
- Jimmie Lou Fisher, Arkansas State Treasurer, 2002 Democratic nominee for Governor of Arkansas
- Junius Marion Futrell, Governor of Arkansas, 1933–1937
- Trice Harvey, California politician
- Homer Lenderman, former state representative for Craighead and Greene counties
- Sam O'Steen, Academy Award-nominated editor
- Lee Purcell, Emmy Award-nominated actress
- Marlin Stuart, Major League Baseball player
- Marko Stunt, professional wrestler for All Elite Wrestling
- George Taylor, Medal of Honor awardee for his actions during the Civil War
- Richard Travis, actor from 1940s films
- James Wayne Wood, former aeronautical engineer, U.S. Air Force officer, test pilot and astronaut
