= Meadow Gold sign =

Tourist attraction in Tulsa, Oklahoma

Meadow Gold Sign
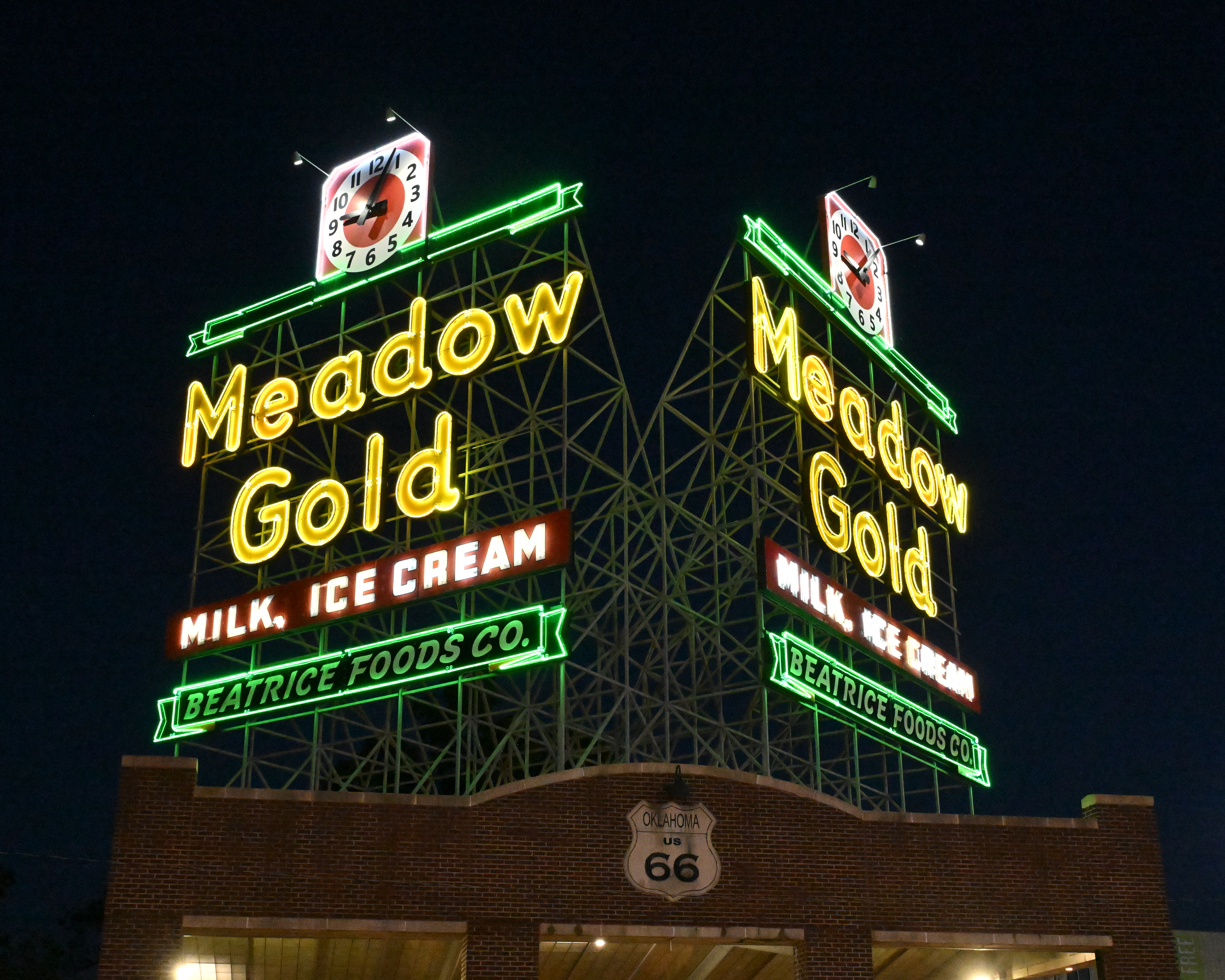
- Interactive map of Meadow Gold Sign
- Location: Tulsa, Oklahoma, United States
- Coordinates: 36.1478711°N 95.9746189°W
- Designer: Claude Neon company
- Type: Advertisement
- Completion date: 1934

The Meadow Gold Sign is a historic advertising sign and U.S. Route 66 landmark in the Pearl District of Tulsa, Oklahoma, United States. The sign is located at East 11th Street and South Quaker Avenue. The advertisement implements neon signage and was built to promote the Beatrice Dairy Company.

== History ==
The sign was built in 1934 by the Claude Neon company, hired by Early Cass as a promotional sign for Beatrice Dairy Company.

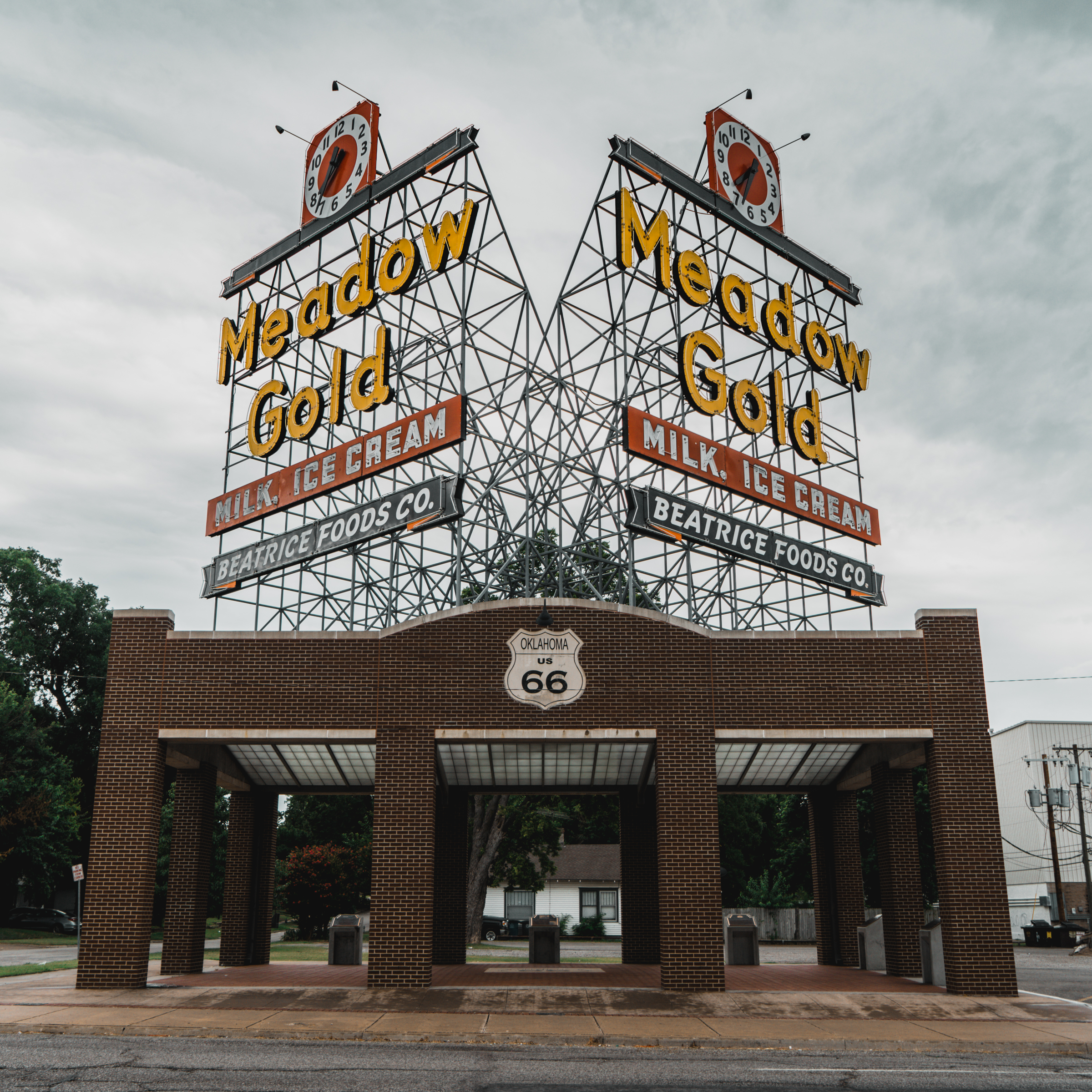
The Meadow Gold sign, 2018

In the 1990s, the sign's lights stopped glowing, and in 2004 the building on which the sign was on top of was sold and demolished. The Tulsa Foundation for Architecture attempted to prevent the demolition by persuading the new owners to let them dismantle the sign and install it in a different location. The TFA received a $15,000 grant from the National Park Service, arguing that the sign had become an art piece. The sign was moved to an open brick structure built specifically for it, with five informational plaques placed inside, the plot of land was donated by Markham Ferrell. Clocks were added to the top of the sign in 2016.

In August 2024, a 20-foot-tall (6.1 m) statue was installed in front of the store beside the sign, Meadow Gold Mack. The statue was built in the 1960s and had previously been located outside of a lumber store in Crystal Lake, Illinois.
