= The Oath Studio =

Historic house in Tulsa, Oklahoma

Coordinates: 36°08′50″N 95°58′36″W

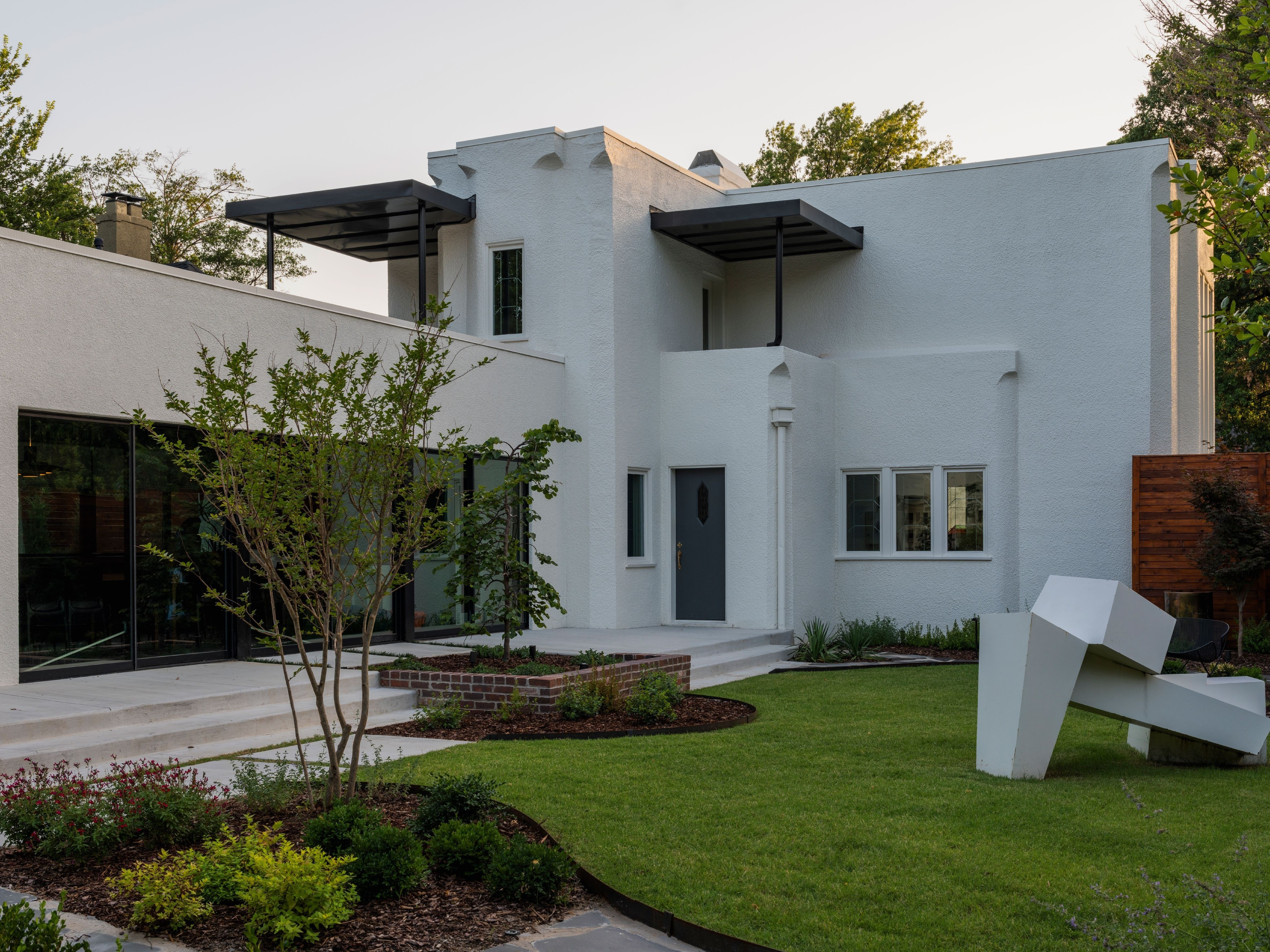
Adah Robinson House, 1119 S. Owasso Ave., Tulsa, Oklahoma.

The Adah Robinson House, now known as The Oath Studio, is a historic house and art studio located in Tulsa, Oklahoma, United States. The house was created in 1925 by architect Bruce Goff for artist and educator Adah Robinson. It is renowned for its early-modernist and distinctively quirky architecture, remarkable interior elements such as a great room that spans two stories and a discussion pit that is recessed into the ground, and its function as a cultural salon for Tulsa's intellectuals and artists. In the early 2020s, the building underwent restoration and was converted into The Oath Studio. It now functions as a creative retreat and event venue.

== History ==
A prominent artist, educator, and designer who made significant contributions to the arts education of the local and regional communities, Adah Robinson (1870–1962), was the recipient of the commission for the construction of the house and studio in 1925. Bruce Goff, who was just beginning his career as an architect at the time, was the one who came up with the design. Later on, he collaborated with Joseph Koberling, an architect, on other modern Tulsa buildings. Robinson used the facility as his main creative workstation, and it also served as a venue for salons and other meetings that brought together Tulsa's musicians, artists, and cultural leaders.

== Design and architectural significance ==
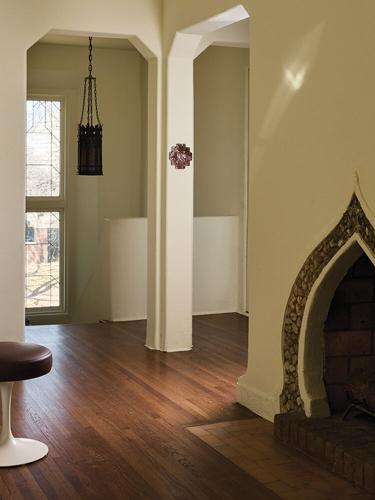
The home's original second-floor fireplace, located in the study, features inlaid stone in a spade-like shape.

The house is a prime example of Bruce Goff's early-modernist style, which encompasses the combination of uncommon materials and shapes with powerful spatial drama. A two-story great room, extensive use of terrazzo flooring, daring fireplace treatments, and the first instance of a conversation pit in American domestic architecture are all distinctive architectural aspects. The shape of the building and the interior layout both show a divergence from the prevalent historical restoration styles of the 1920s. This departure is indicative of Goff's inventive trajectory, which would eventually get national notice. Not only does the design express communication with regional creative trends, but it also depicts the local Art Deco context that existed in Tulsa during the time of the oil boom.

== Associations with artists and cultural figures ==
During the time that Adah Robinson was in charge of the house, it flourished into a hub for artistic expression and community interaction. Over the course of the twentieth century, the studio served as a gathering place for artists, students, and intellectuals, therefore contributing to the expansion of Tulsa's cultural network. The fact that Bruce Goff is associated with the house lends it an additional architectural value, establishing a connection between the property and Goff's larger body of work, which includes important works located throughout Oklahoma and the United States. Both the house's selection for public tours and its participation in Tulsa architectural programs reflect the creative history that the building carries.

== Renovations and restorations ==
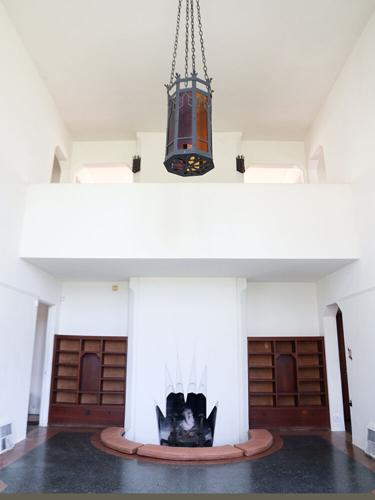
Inside the home before the renovation

Rod Yancy, the owner-restorer, had the task of completing a full restoration in the early 2020s. Justice Quinn and architect Philip Doyle contributed to the design of the restoration. A delicate adaptation of the building for modern use as a venue for events and retreats was the goal of the restoration project. The goal was to maintain character-defining aspects, such as the original floor treatments and spatial arrangements, while also adapting the house for current usage. The restoration of these connections was made possible by the preservation of traditional outdoor linkages and the introduction of complementary facilities for public programming, landscape, and courtyard interventions. Following the completion of the repair, the house reopened its doors as "The Oath Studio".

== Associations with non-profit activity and The Oath Foundation ==
After undergoing renovation, the building has been renamed The Oath Studio and is now affiliated with the Oath Foundation, which is a charitable organization that aims to provide financial assistance for artistic programs, residencies, and community activities. After its revival and transformation for communal use, the Oath Studio serves as a location for a variety of events, including public tours, creative retreats, and curated meetings. These events are planned in conjunction with local cultural groups, such as the Tulsa Foundation for Architecture.

== Legacy and preservation status ==
A significant example of Bruce Goff's early work, the Adah Robinson House is a tangible tribute to Adah Robinson's influence on the arts education of the surrounding area. It is also an important example of their early work. Architectural tours and publications that emphasize Tulsa's distinctive architectural legacy continue to promote the house as a focal point throughout the years. Preservation and adaptive reuse activities have been successful in preserving the building's architectural uniqueness while also offering a sustainable programmatic future via the management of nonprofit organizations and community involvement.

== See also ==
- Boston Avenue Methodist Church
