= Rushville Commercial Historic District =

Historic district in Indiana, United States

- U.S. National Register of Historic Places
- U.S. Historic district
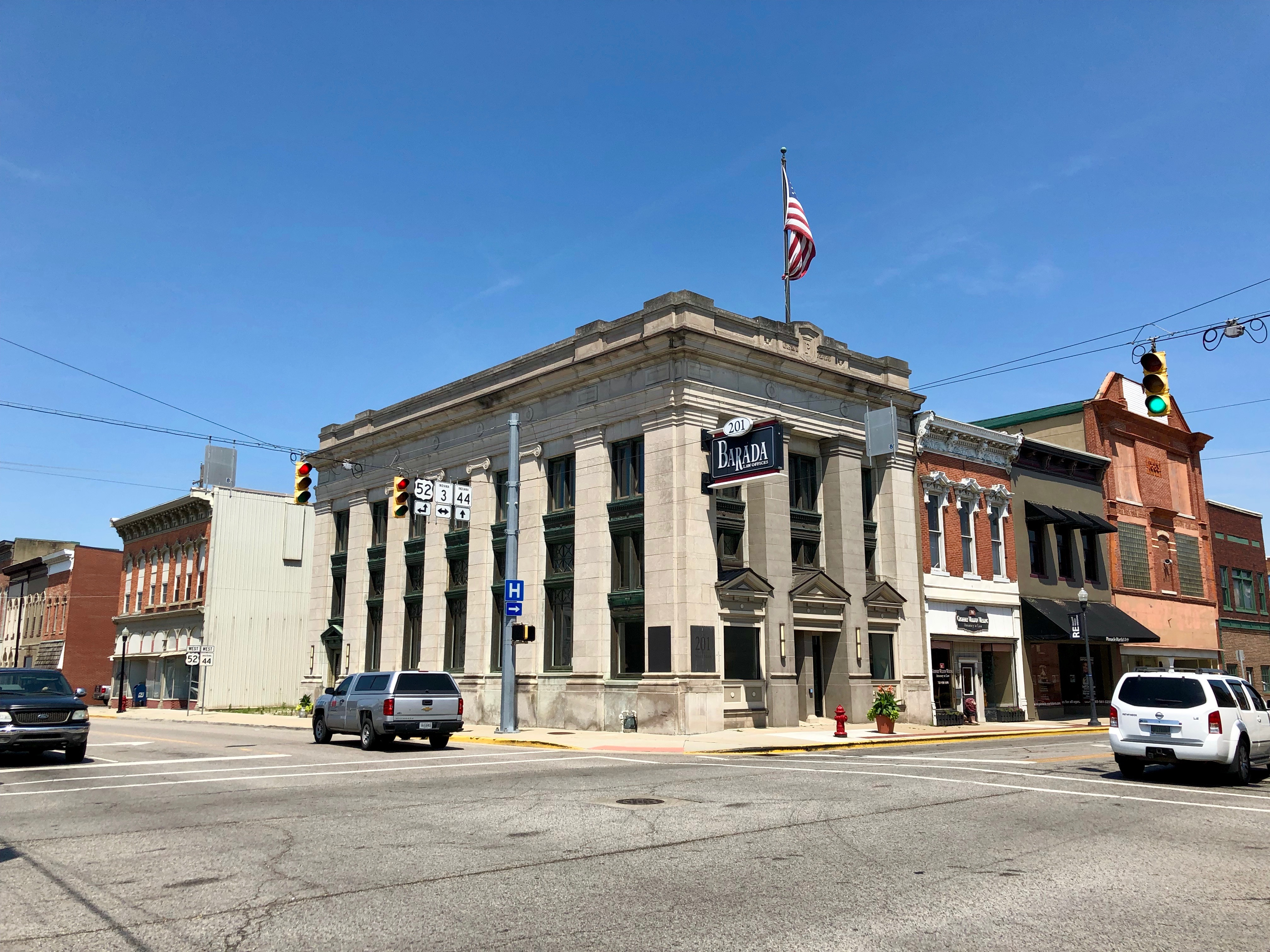
- Corner of Main Street and 2nd Street, July 2019

- Location within Indiana Location within the United States
- Location: Roughly bounded by Fourth, N. Morgan, First and N. Perkins Sts., Rushville, Indiana
- Coordinates: 39°36′30″N 85°26′42″W
- Area: 18 acres (7.3 ha)
- Architect: Multiple
- Architectural style: Multiple
- NRHP reference No.: 93001416
- Added to NRHP: December 27, 1993

Rushville Commercial Historic District is a national historic district located at Rushville, Indiana. The district encompasses 54 contributing buildings in the central business district of Rushville. The district developed between about 1847 and 1940 and includes notable examples of Greek Revival, Italianate, Romanesque Revival, Classical Revival, Collegiate Gothic, Commercial style, and Art Deco style architecture. Located in the district are the separately listed Durbin Hotel, Melodeon Hall, and Rush County Courthouse. Other notable buildings include the former Methodist Episcopal Church (1847–1850), Church of Christ / Boys' and Girls' Club (1850–1853), Beher-King Block (1883), Presbyterian Church (1892–1893), Rushville National Bank (1911), Phoenix Lodge (1913–1915), Rushville Public Library (c. 1930), and former Castle Theatre (1939).

It was listed on the National Register of Historic Places in 1993.
