= Tracy Park Historic District =

Historic district in Oklahoma, United States

- U.S. National Register of Historic Places
- U.S. Historic district
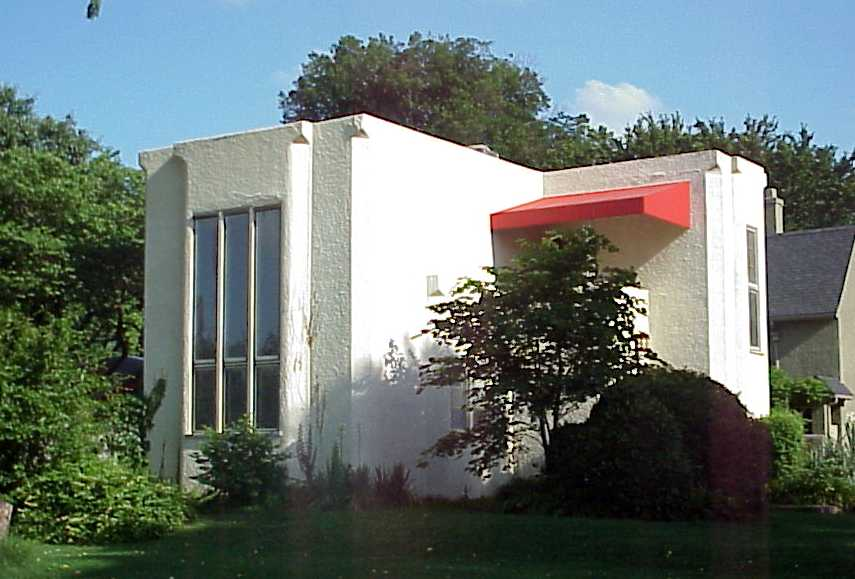
- Adah Robinson House; 1119 S. Owasso, Tulsa; May 31, 2007
- Location: Tulsa, Oklahoma
- Built: Early 1920s
- Architect: Multiple
- Architectural style: Multiple
- NRHP reference No.: 82003707
- Added to NRHP: September 20, 1982

Tracy Park is a historic neighborhood in Tulsa, Oklahoma. It is a relatively small neighborhood consisting primarily of single-family houses that were built in the Riverview Addition during the early 1920s. The Tracy Park Historic District was added to the National Register of Historic Places on September 20, 1982 with the NRIS number 82003707. The district is bounded on the north by 11th Street, on the east by Peoria Avenue, and on the south and west by the Inner Dispersal Loop. It was the first area in Tulsa to be nominated as a district on the National Register of Historic Places.

== Tracy Park ==
Tracy Park is a 3.3 acres (1.3 ha) neighborhood park, located at 1134 South Peoria Avenue. The park features a playground and picnic area, lighted tennis courts and a splash pool, and is administered by the Tulsa Parks and Recreation Department. The park also has formal gardens.

== History ==
The district covers the north half of an 80 acres (32 ha) allotment to Nola Childers Tracy, an orphaned girl of the Osage and Creek Nations, for whom the district and park are named. A lot sale was held in April, 1919, to open the subdivision for construction. Tracy Park subdivision was the first "standardized" subdivision (i.e. building restrictions limited the owners' options as to how to construct a dwelling on his lot).

The district was initially a part of the Ridgewood Subdivision and adjoined the Broadmoor Subdivision. At the opening, it contained 142 lots.

Construction of the Inner Dispersal Loop Expressway in the late 1960s caused many houses to be demolished. As a result, the district now covers only 68 surviving houses.

== Description ==
The district is primarily residential, composed of one and two-story houses that were designed for Tulsa's rapidly growing middle class market of the early 1920s. Architectural styles used were mainly Georgian Revival, Dutch Colonial, Spanish, Cottage and Bungalow. Exteriors were clapboard, stucco, and brick . Deed restrictions required that bungalows be built north of 12th Street and two-story houses could only be built south of 12th street.

In 1924, noted artist and teacher, Adah Robinson, built a combination residence and studio at 1119 Owasso Street. Bruce Goff and Joseph R. Koberling, Jr. both assisted in the design. (Note: Goff and Koberling were both students of Goff at Tulsa Central High School. Both later became notable architects themselves.) The house faces Tracy Park and is the most notable structure in the Tracy Park Historic District.

== Preservation status ==
Tracy Park was placed on the Oklahoma Landmarks Inventory in July 1978. It was added to the National Register of Historic Places under Categories A and C on September 20, 1982. Its NRIS number is 82003707.
