= Rush, Endacott and Rush =

American architectural firm

Rush, Endacott and Rush was an American architectural firm known for its designs in Tulsa, Oklahoma, from 1912 to 1929.

Principals A. William Rush, a civil engineer, and his son, Edwin Arthur Rush, were partners in the predecessor firm A.W. Rush and Son in Grand Rapids, Michigan, and later in Chicago, Illinois, between 1891 and 1912. The firm moved to Tulsa, Oklahoma, and formed Rush, Endacott and Rush with Asbury Endacott. A.W. Rush retired in 1913 and died in 1923, but his name remained on the firm until 1929.

Noted architect Bruce Goff was apprenticed at the age of 12 to Rush, Endacott and Rush, and briefly became a partner in the successor firm Rush, Endacott and Goff in Tulsa from 1929 to 1930.

== A.W. Rush and Son Works ==
- 4 story office building, Monroe St, Grand Rapids, Michigan (1891)
- Pythian Temple, Ionia Avenue at Monroe Avenue, Grand Rapids, Michigan (1894), designed by member A.W. Rush
- Union Depot, 610 Western Avenue, Muskegon, Michigan (1895), NRHP 00001489
- Pulaski County Courthouse, 112 East Main Street, Winamac, Indiana (1895), NRHP 07001282
- Fulton County Courthouse, 815 Main Street, Rochester, Indiana (1896), NRHP 00001138
- Rush County Courthouse, Courthouse Square, Rushville, Indiana (1898), NRHP 75000048
- Johnson County Courthouse, South Clinton Street, Iowa City, Iowa (1901), NRHP 75000692
- Carnegie Center for the Arts (originally Three Rivers Public Library), 107 North Main Street, Three Rivers, Michigan (1904)
- Iowa Apartment, Grand Rapids, Michigan (1905)

== Rush, Endacott and Rush Works ==
- Wright Building, 115 West 3rd Street, Tulsa, Oklahoma (1917)
- Tulsa Municipal Building, 4th at Cincinnati, Tulsa, Oklahoma (1917)
- First National Bank Building, Tulsa, Oklahoma (1919)
- Atlas Life Building, 415 South Boston Avenue, Tulsa, Oklahoma (1922), NRHP 09000358
- Tulsa Club, 115 East 5th Street, Tulsa, Oklahoma (1927)
- Page Warehouse, 2036 East 11th Street, Tulsa, Oklahoma (1927)
- Boston Avenue United Methodist Church, 1301 South Boston Avenue, Tulsa, Oklahoma (1927–29), NRHP 78002270, design credited to Bruce Goff and Adah Robinson
- Pittsburgh Equitable Meter Company building, 3130 Charles Page Boulevard, Tulsa, Oklahoma (1929)

== Gallery ==
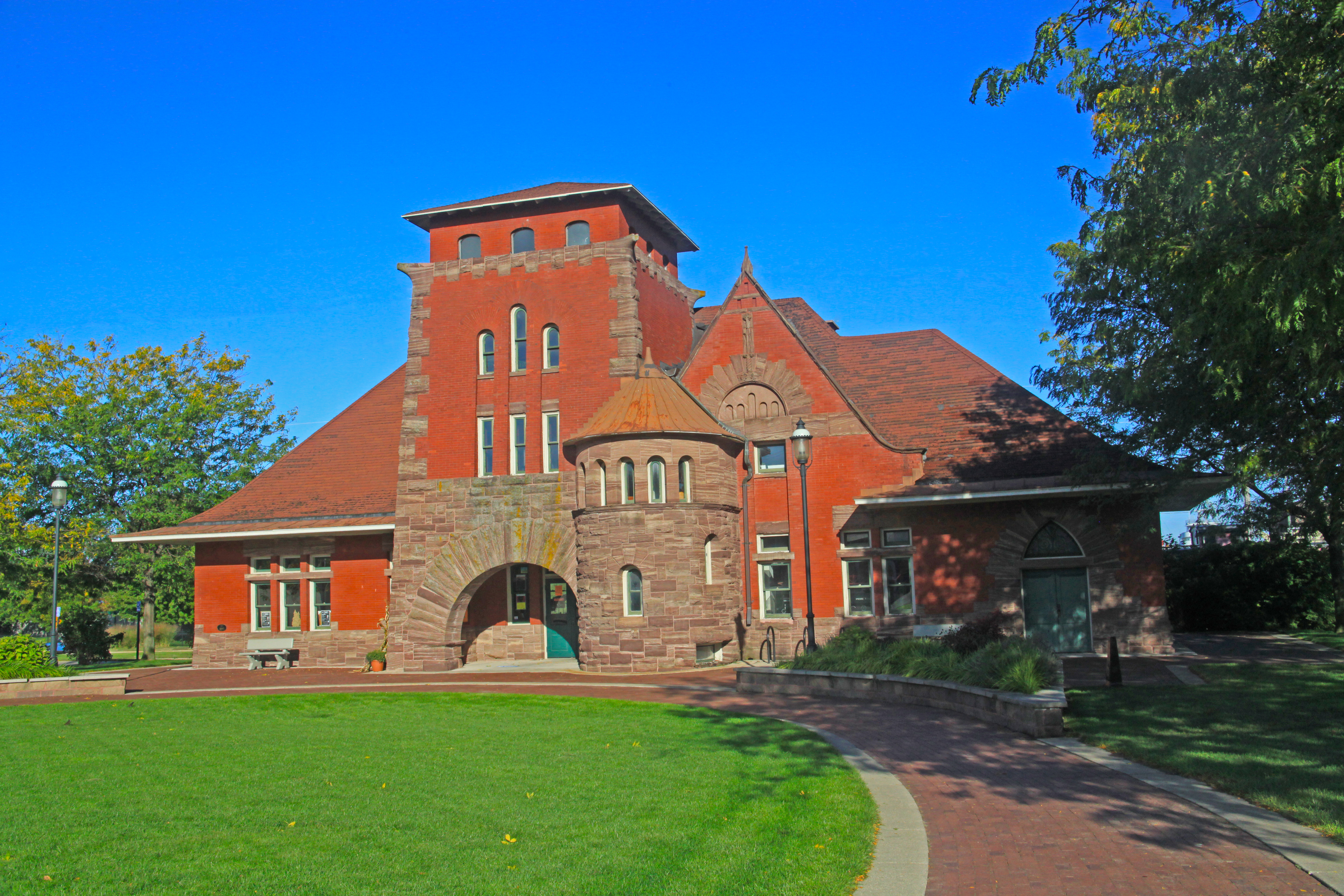
Muskegon Union Depot

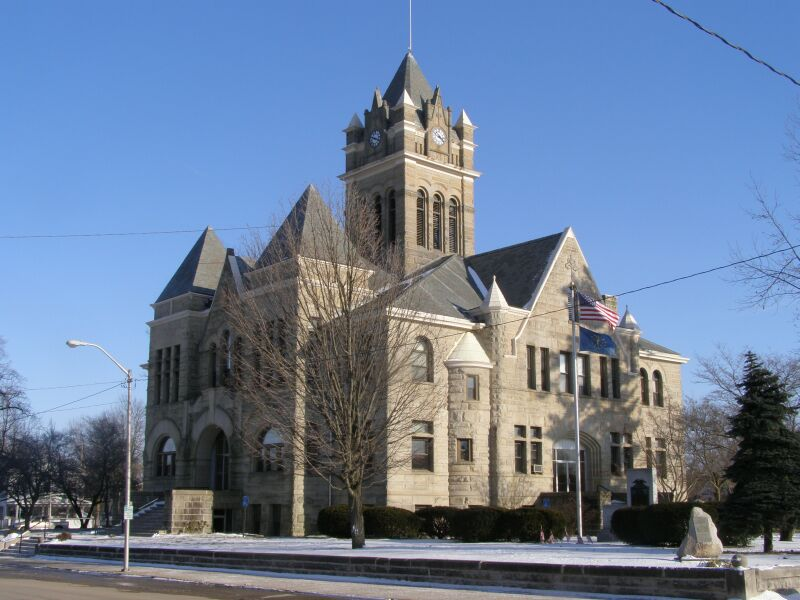
Pulaski County Courthouse

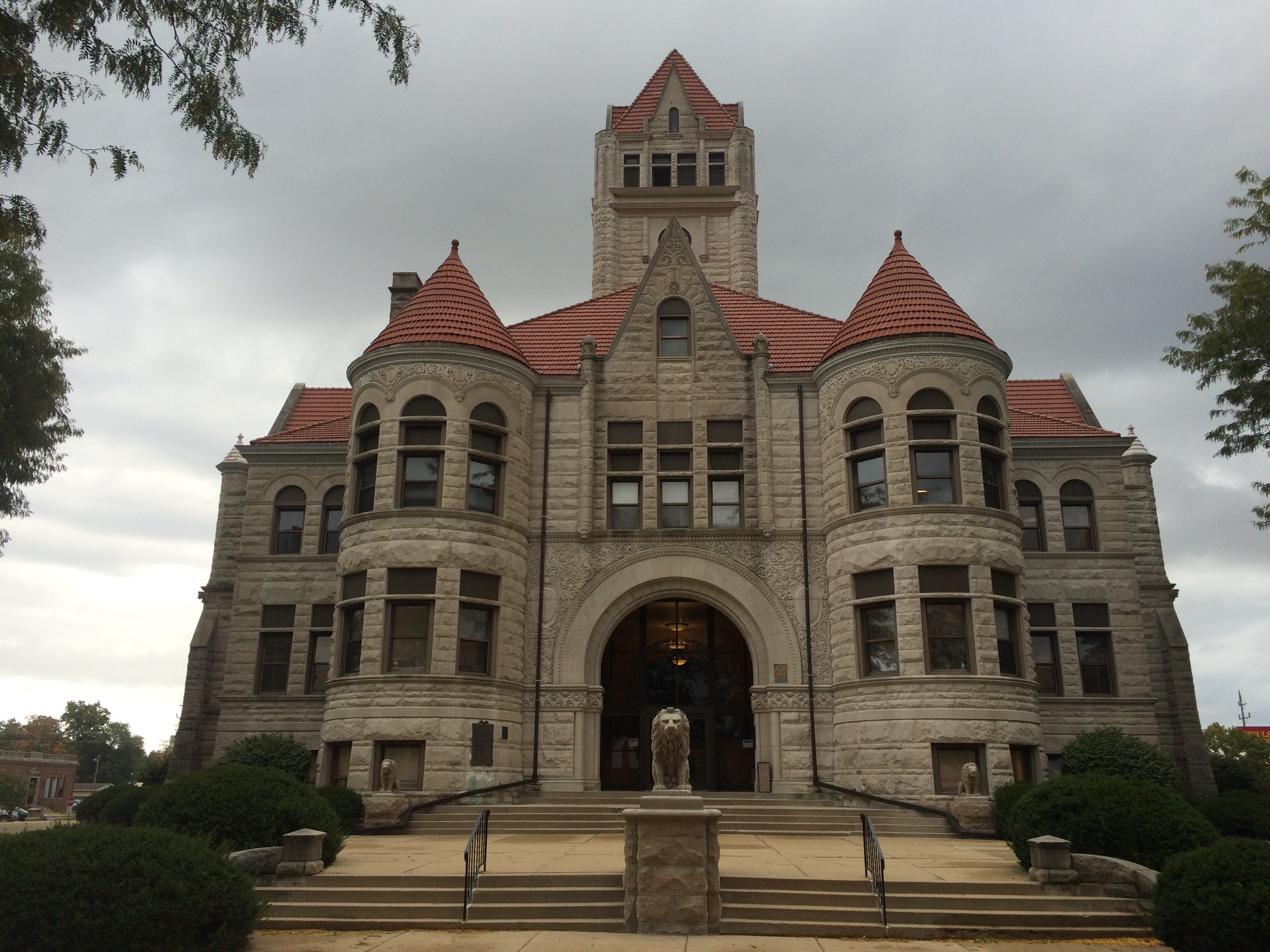
Fulton County Courthouse

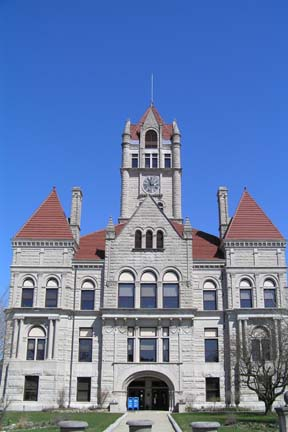
Rush County Courthouse

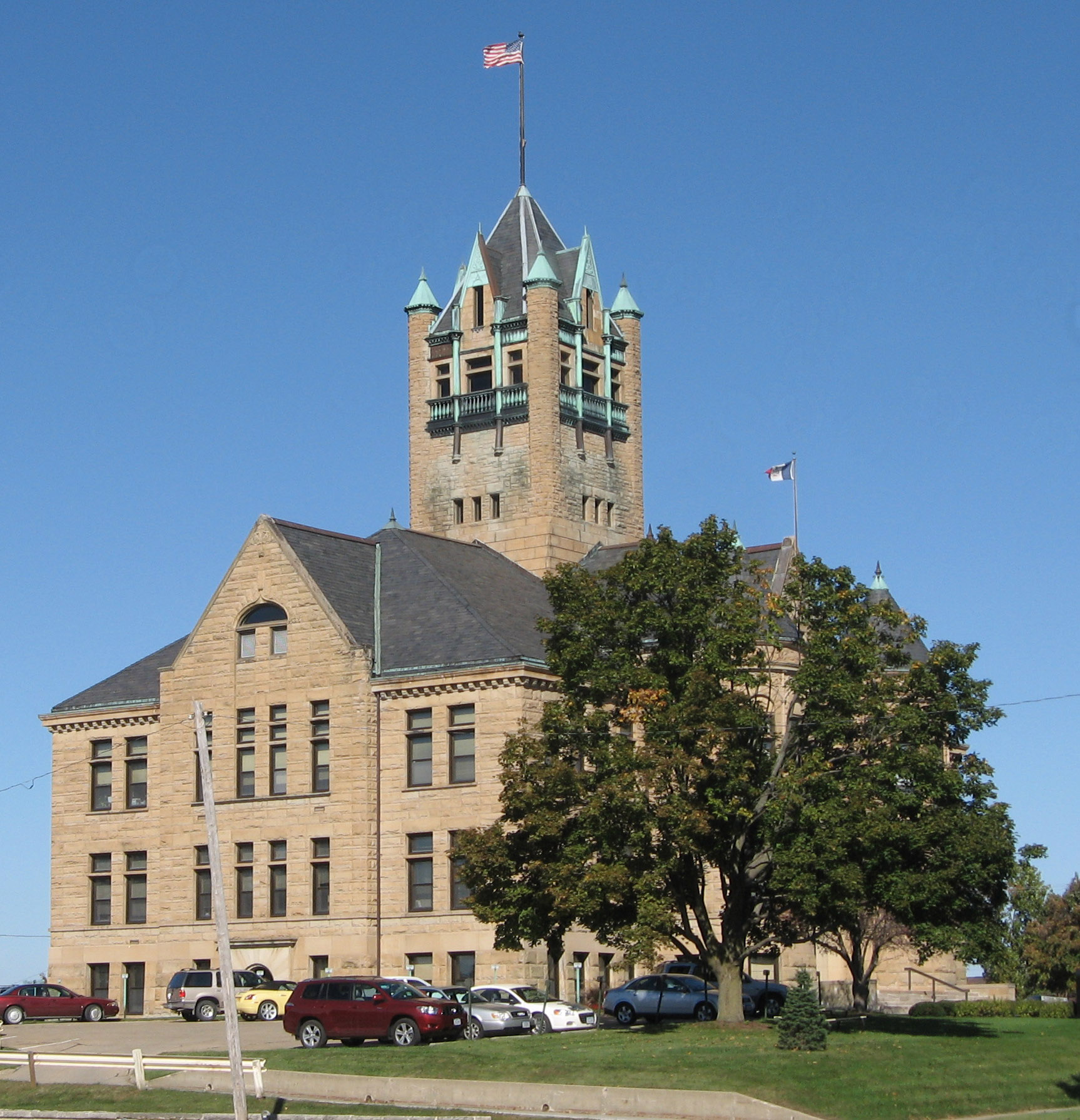
Johnson County Courthouse

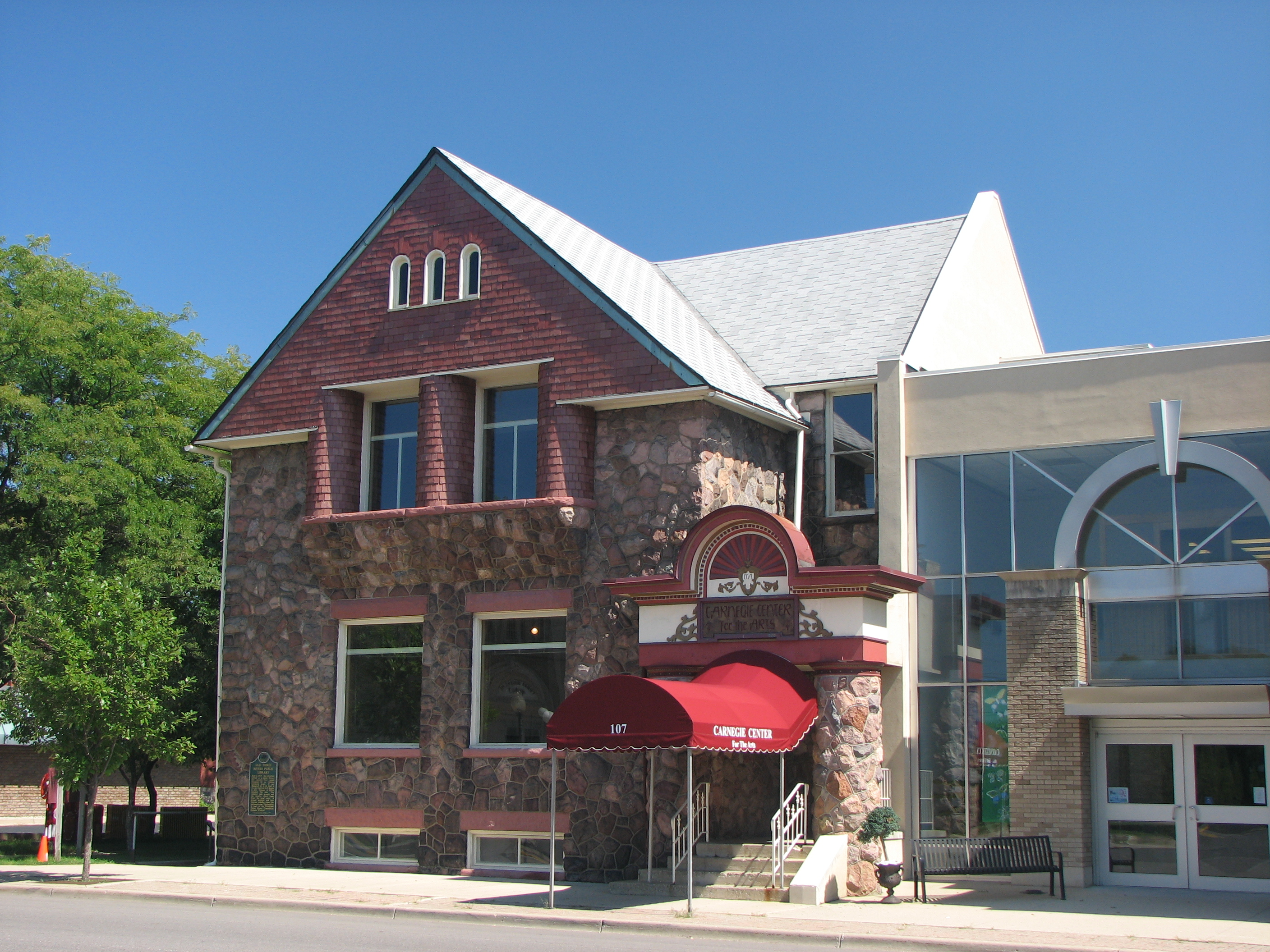
Carnegie Center for the Arts (Three Rivers Public Library)

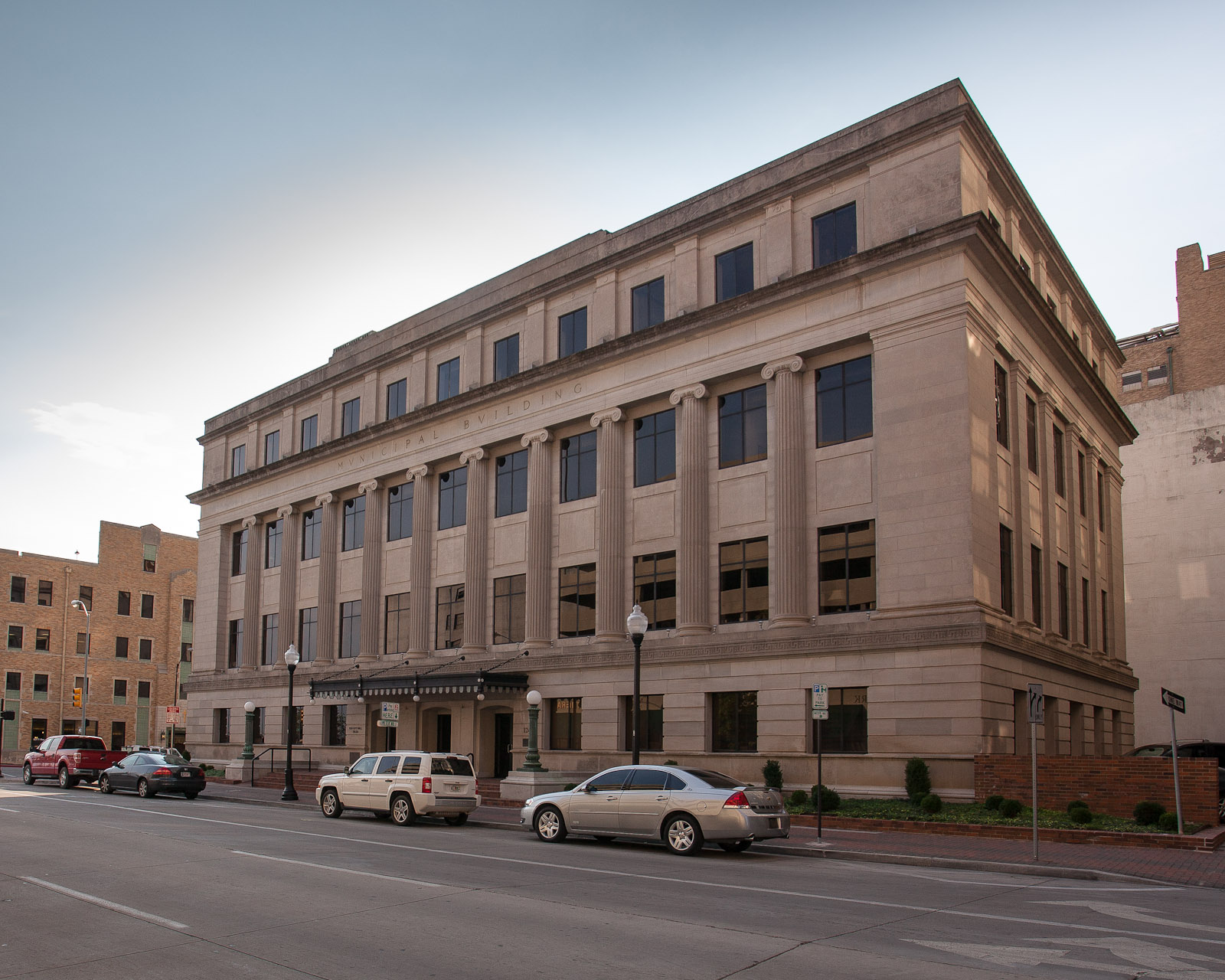
Tulsa Municipal Building

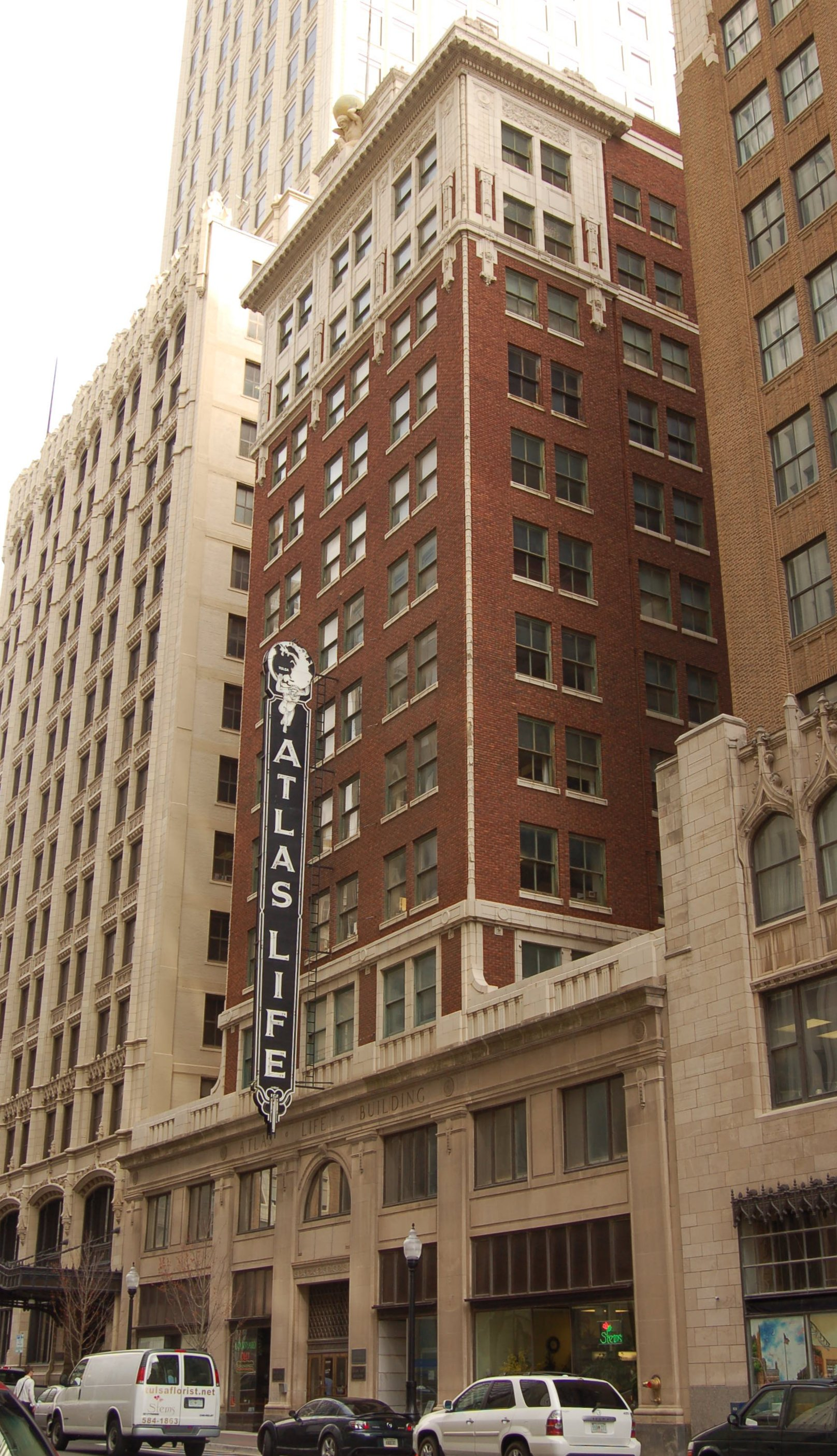
Atlas Life Building

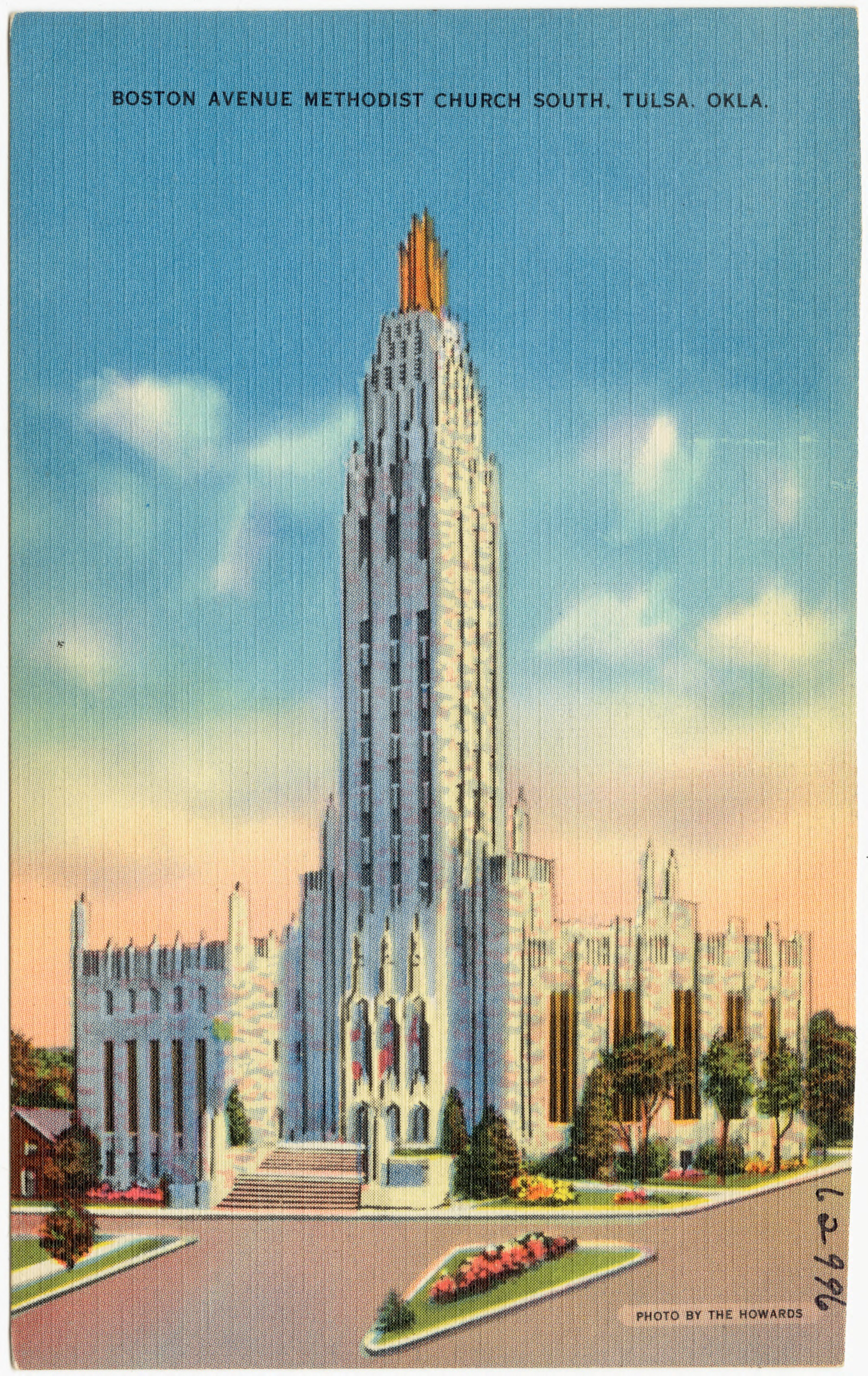
Boston Avenue Methodist Church South
