= Plum Creek Christian Church =

- Plum Creek Christian Church
- 39°41′27.8″N 85°22′06.7″W
- Location: 4011 E 550 N, Rushville, Indiana
- Country: United States
- Denomination: Christian

History
- Founded: December 1833

Plum Creek Christian Church is a church located in Rushville, Indiana. The church has a membership of 175, and a Sunday school enrollment of 200.

== History ==
Plum Creek Christian Church was established in December 1833 by a group of Christians. A little over a decade later, in 1844 or 1845, a church building was constructed near Shawnee Creek, about two miles from the original location. In 1874 a new location was sought, which resulted in the purchasing and conversion of an old Methodist church frame building.
