= Melodeon Hall =

- U.S. National Register of Historic Places
- U.S. Historic district – Contributing property
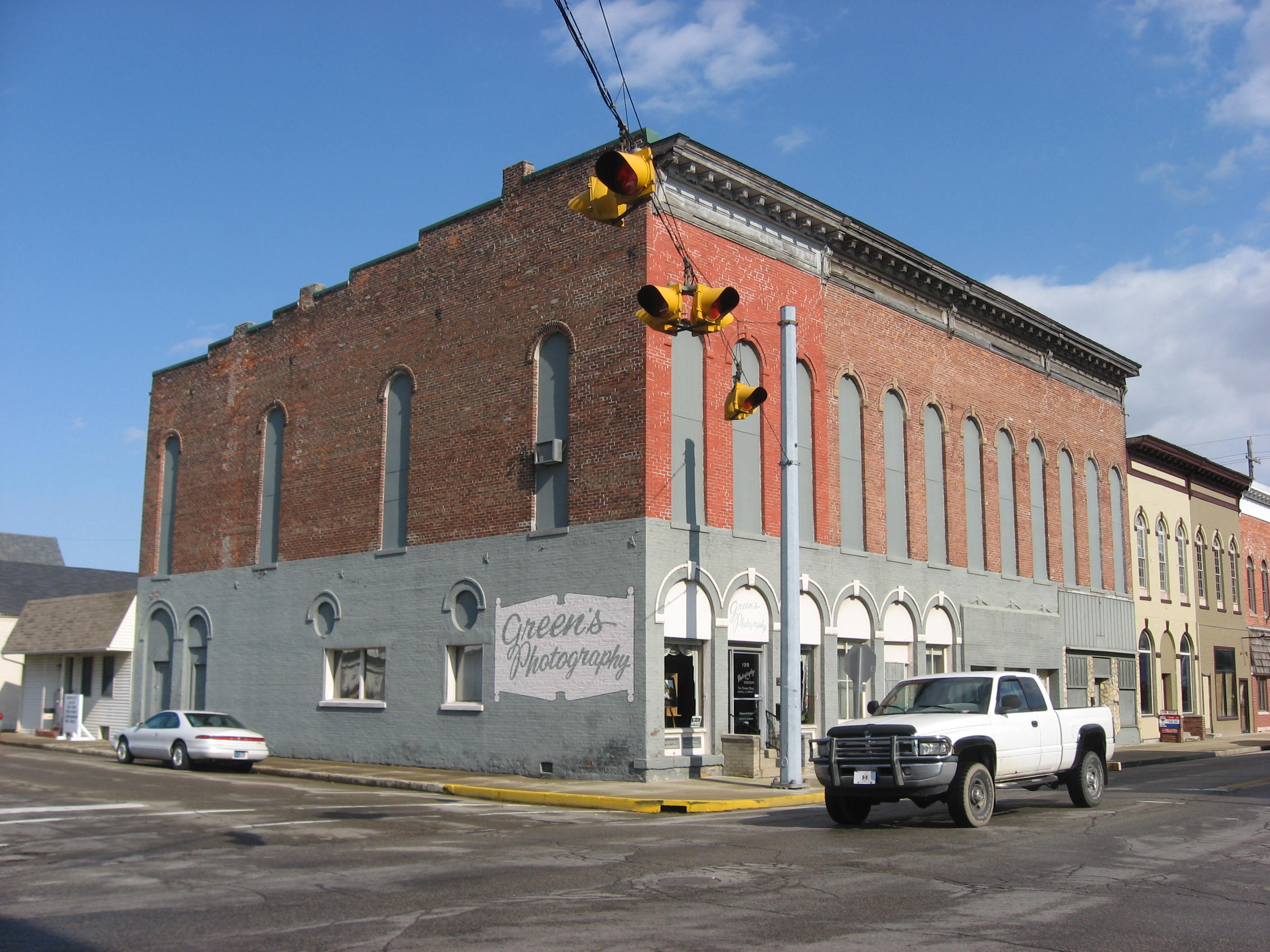
- Melodeon Hall, November 2009

- Location within Indiana Location within the United States
- Location: 210 N. Morgan St., Rushville, Indiana
- Coordinates: 39°36′30″N 85°26′46″W
- Area: 0.3 acres (0.12 ha)
- Built: 1872
- Architectural style: Late Victorian
- NRHP reference No.: 73000041
- Added to NRHP: November 15, 1973

Melodeon Hall is a historic meeting hall and theatre building located at Rushville, Indiana. It was built in 1872, and is a two-story, Late Victorian style brick building. The Melodeon Hall is located on the second floor and measures 58 feet wide by 42 feet long. The lower-level houses three shops.

It was listed on the National Register of Historic Places in 1982. It is located in the Rushville Commercial Historic District.
