= Durbin Hotel =

- U.S. National Register of Historic Places
- U.S. Historic district – Contributing property
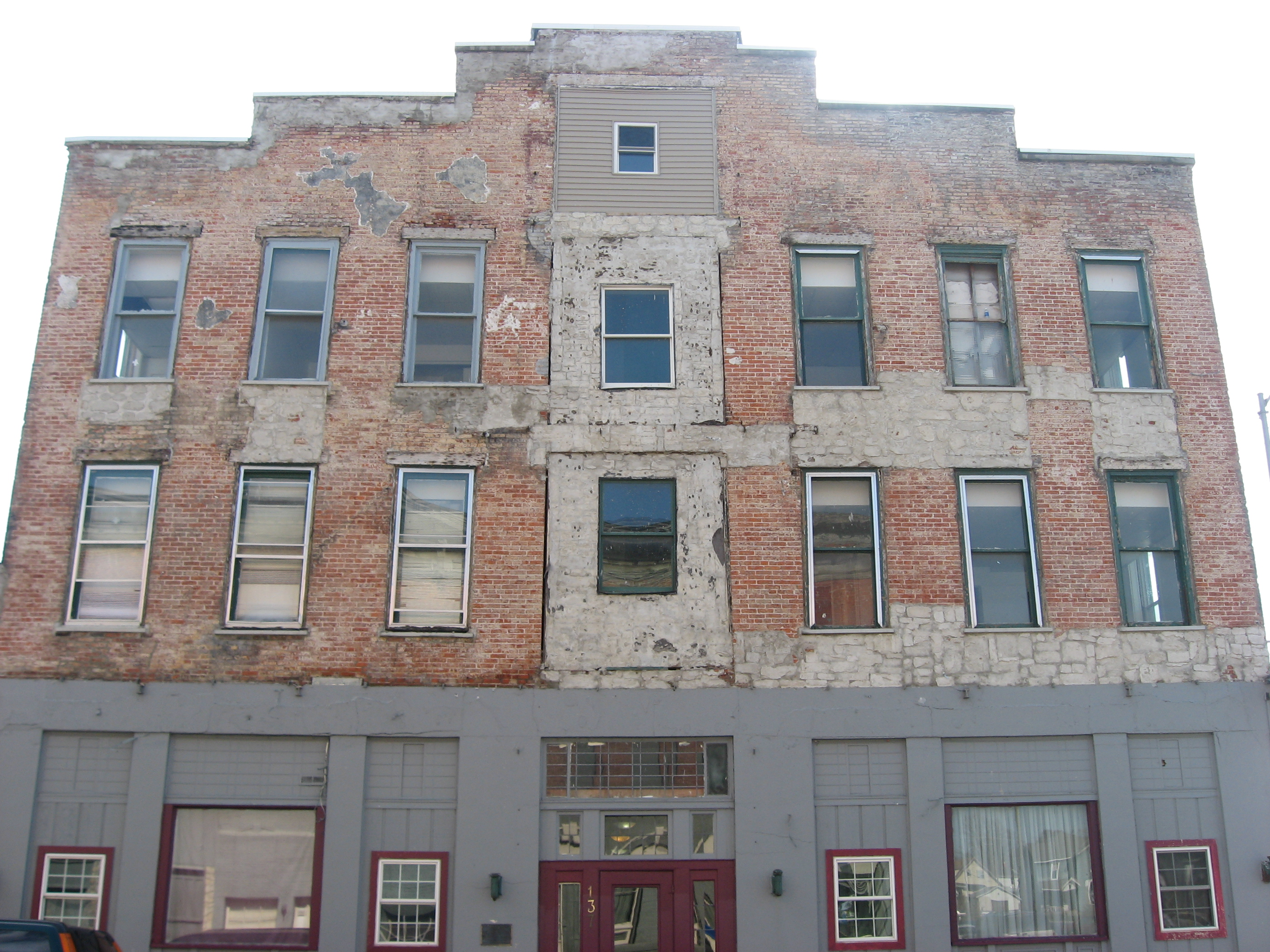
- The Durbin Hotel, c. 1855
- Location: 137 W. 2nd St., Rushville, Indiana
- Coordinates: 39°36′29″N 85°26′45″W
- Area: less than one acre
- Built: c.1855; 171 years ago 1885; 141 years ago (addition)
- NRHP reference No.: 82000072
- Added to NRHP: February 19, 1982

Durbin Hotel is a historic hotel building located at Rushville, Indiana. It was built about 1855, and is a three-story, brick building with a two-story rear addition constructed in 1885. It measures 115 by 200 ft (35 by 61 m). It features the original central doorway with sidelights and transom and a stepped front gable facade.

It was listed on the National Register of Historic Places in 1982. It is in the Rushville Commercial Historic District.
