= St. Paul Methodist Episcopal Church (Rushville, Indiana) =

Historic church in Indiana, United States

- U.S. National Register of Historic Places
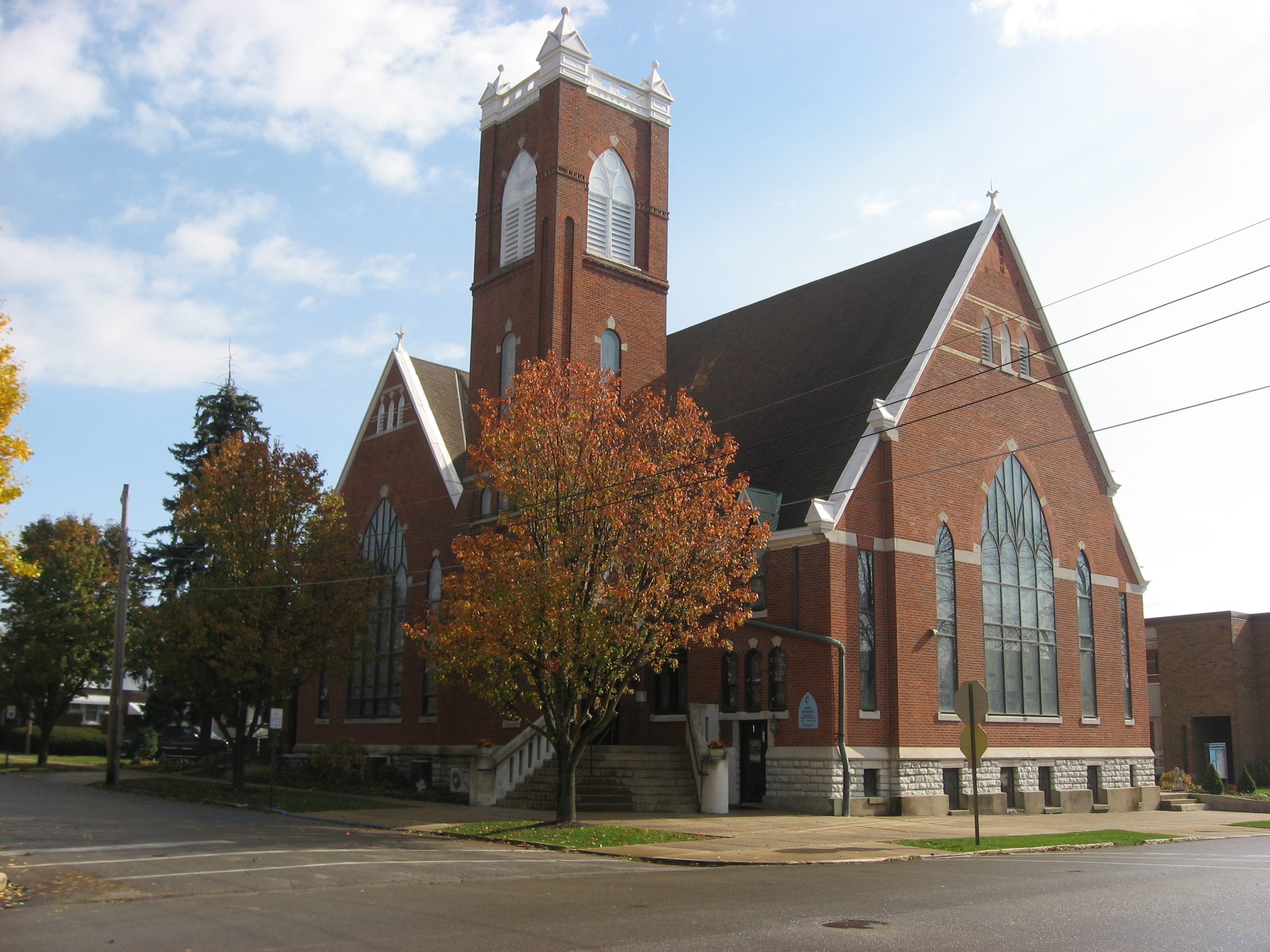
- St. Paul Methodist Church, November 2009

- Location within Indiana Location within the United States
- Location: 426 N. Morgan St., Rushville, Indiana
- Coordinates: 39°36′35″N 85°26′38″W
- Area: less than one acre
- Built: 1887
- Architect: McDaniel, David W.
- Architectural style: Gothic, Late Victorian
- NRHP reference No.: 97001536
- Added to NRHP: December 15, 1997

St. Paul Methodist Episcopal Church, also known as St. Paul United Methodist Church, is a historic Methodist Episcopal church located at Rushville, Indiana. It was built in 1887, and is a one-story, cruciform plan, Victorian Gothic style brick building with a steeply pitched gable roof. A basement was added in 1923. It features a square bell tower, Gothic arched windows, decorative stone bands, and terra cotta accents.

It was listed on the National Register of Historic Places in 1997.
