= Central High School (Tulsa, Oklahoma) =

Coordinates: 36.162761°N 96.026927°W

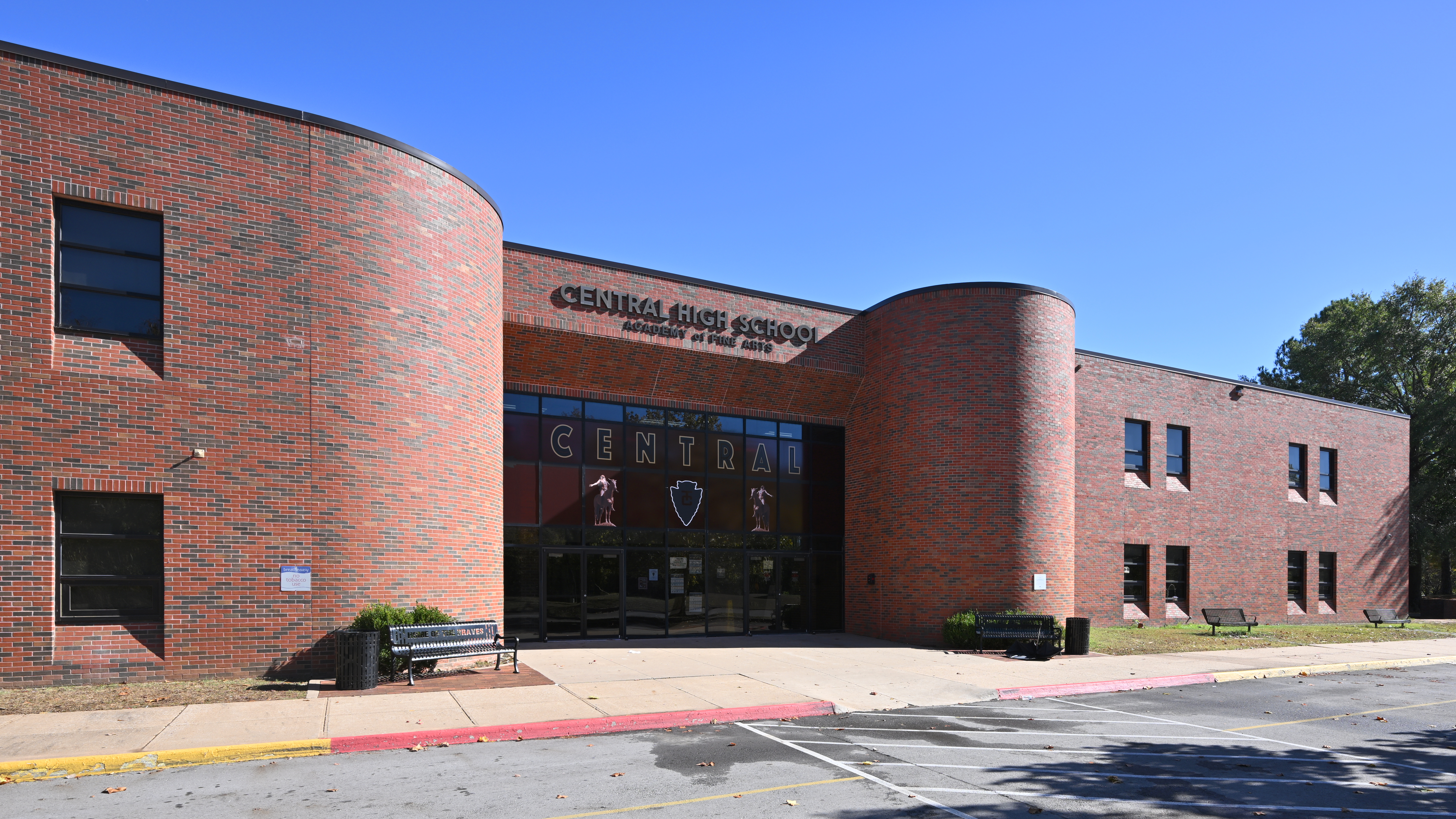
- 3101 West Edison Street; Tulsa, Oklahoma 74127

Information
- Type: Public fine arts and performing arts magnet school
- Established: 1906
- Principal: Jason Gilley
- Staff: 19.51 (on an FTE basis)
- Grades: 6–12
- Enrollment: 378 (2023–2024)
- Student to teacher ratio: 19.37
- Colors: Crimson and cream
- Mascot: Brave
- Website: http://central.tulsaschools.org

Central High School is the oldest high school in Tulsa, Oklahoma, United States. It was founded in 1906 as Tulsa High School, and located in downtown Tulsa until 1976. The school now has a 47-acre (19 ha) campus in northwest Tulsa. Tulsa Central is part of the Tulsa Public Schools, Oklahoma's largest school district, and is a public school for students from grades 6 through 12. Since 1997 it has served as a fine and performing arts magnet school.

== History ==
The original Tulsa High School was erected in 1906 at Fourth and Boston in downtown Tulsa. In 1913 it became the third school in the state to win accreditation. A new building opened in 1917 at the corner of Sixth and Cincinnati, and was enlarged in 1922. The Manual Arts building at Ninth and Cincinnati was added in 1925. Tulsa Central was at one time said to be the second largest high school in the country, and included an indoor pool, an indoor track, an extensive art collection, and a large pipe organ.

Central was Tulsa's only public high school for white students, and by 1938 it had grown to its peak enrollment of more than 5,000 students in grades 10–12. Finally, Tulsa opened two new high schools: Webster High School in West Tulsa (in 1938), and Will Rogers High School east of downtown (in 1939). Booker T. Washington High School was established for African American students in 1913. Tulsa's schools were legally racially segregated until 1955, and remained segregated de facto at least into the 1970s, due to population patterns and school policies.

The construction of Tulsa's Inner Dispersal Loop freeway impaired the school's access to the outdoor physical education facilities at Central Park and Tracy Park. The cost of downtown parking was also a problem. These factors led to the decision to move the school out of downtown. The new 47-acre (19 ha) campus was opened in 1976, at 31st West Avenue and Edison Street, in the portion of northwest Tulsa that is located in Osage County.

The old Central High School building at Sixth and Cincinnati was leased by Public Service Company of Oklahoma (PSO). After a complete renovation and extensive interior modifications in 1977, it now serves as PSO's headquarters. The renovated and adapted building has been named a Tulsa landmark by the Tulsa Foundation for Architecture. The former Manual Arts Building at Ninth and Cincinnati is now part of the downtown campus of Tulsa Community College. PSO terminated the old high school building lease and bought the building outright in 2013.

== Notable faculty ==
=== Adah Robinson ===
Adah Robinson, an art teacher at Tulsa Central for several years in the late 1910s, is credited with the design of the Boston Avenue Methodist Church, an outstanding example of religious Art Deco architecture that is now designated as a National Historic Landmark. Robinson's collaborator in the design was Bruce Goff, her former student at Tulsa Central, and an architectural prodigy who designed 61 Tulsa buildings between 1920 and 1931. The precise extent of Goff's and Robinson's respective contributions to the church remains controversial.

Goff and Robinson also collaborated on the design of Robinson's own house, built 1927–1929, and now listed as an Art Deco landmark in Tulsa's Tracy Park Historic District. The house was finished by another Robinson student, Joseph R. Koberling, Jr. who also became an important Tulsa architect and later worked on another city landmark, Will Rogers High School.

In 1928, Robinson established and headed the art department at the University of Tulsa. She redesigned the interiors of several other notable Tulsa churches. She received an honorary doctorate from the University of Tulsa in 1936. From 1945 to 1959 she chaired the art department at Trinity University, in San Antonio, Texas. She died in Tulsa in 1962.

=== Isabelle Ronan ===
Isabelle Ronan, who taught at Tulsa Central from 1922 to 1955, became a well-known mentor for students interested in performing arts and broadcasting. In the words of a 1997 Tulsa World article,

The Central High School of that era was known for its superior theater and drama department, a different discipline from "speech" connected with debate or oratory. The reason: A gifted and inspired teacher named Isabelle Ronan, who had a knack for recognizing students with theatrical talent and desire to perform. She was the MISS Ronan to students, other teachers and administrative staff as well.

==== Teacher of Paul Harvey ====
One of Ronan's most famous students was radio legend Paul Harvey, then named Paul Harvey Aurandt. Harvey credited Ronan with getting his career started at the age of 14. Harvey said that Ronan was "impressed by his voice".

She took me by the hand and marched me down to KVOO, and said this young man ought to be on the radio. She just wouldn't accept no. So I did my school chores in the daytime and hung around the radio station so many hours at night that they finally put me on the payroll to limit those hours.

Harvey told this story in repeated interviews. He also paid tribute to Ronan in a nostalgic 1994 radio broadcast delivered after he had returned to Tulsa for a fundraising banquet.

==== Other notable Ronan students ====
In addition to Paul Harvey, other Ronan students at Tulsa Central who went on to professional success in broadcasting or the performing arts included:

- Tony Randall (Arthur Leonard Rosenberg), stage, film, and television actor
- Mary Stuart (Mary Stuart Houchins), actress who starred for 35 years as the character Joanne Gardner on the soap opera Search for Tomorrow
- Danny Dark (Daniel Croskery), voiceover artist who was especially known for his work in famous commercials, including as the announcer who said "Sorry, Charlie" in the Charlie the Tuna commercials for StarKist Tuna

=== Notable coaches ===
Eddie Sutton began his head coaching career at Tulsa Central, where he coached 1959–1966 before going on to become one of only seven major men's college basketball coaches to have over 800 career wins.

Tommy Hudspeth coached football at Tulsa Central in 1956 before moving on to the college and professional ranks, most notably for eight years as the head coach at Brigham Young University.

Art Griffith was the wrestling coach at Tulsa Central for 15 years, winning ten state and two national wrestling tournaments. He moved on to Oklahoma State University in 1941, where he led the Cowboys to eight national championships and was elected to the National Wrestling Hall of Fame. Griffith's successor at Tulsa Central was Rex Peery, who later became the Pittsburgh Panthers wrestling coach, and was also elected to the National Wrestling Hall of Fame.

== Notable alumni ==
Other notable people who attended Tulsa Central include:

- William French Anderson, gene therapy pioneer
- Ralph Blane, composer and lyricist
- Daniel J. Boorstin, historian and 12th Librarian of Congress 1975–1987
- Joe Brainard, artist and poet, co-founder of The White Dove Review as a Central High student
- Jim R. Caldwell, Class of 1954, former member of the Arkansas State Senate; retired in Tulsa
- J. J. Cale, singer-songwriter, pioneer of The Tulsa Sound
- Rocky Frisco, rock music pianist
- Jim Hartz, television broadcaster, co-host of the Today Show
- Ben Graf Henneke, president of the University of Tulsa, 1958–1967
- Gary Howard, former head coach of the Central Oklahoma Bronchos football program
- Jim Inhofe, U.S. senator from Oklahoma
- Brandon Jenkins, singer-songwriter from Tulsa, Oklahoma who sang in the choir, and taught himself guitar
- George Kaiser, chairman of BOK Financial Corporation, philanthropist, one of the richest people in the world
- Leroy McGuirk, longtime professional wrestling promoter
- Shelby Metcalf, head basketball coach at Texas A&M 1963–1990
- Les Moss, major-league baseball player, 1946–1958
- Ron Padgett, poet and writer, co-founder of The White Dove Review as a Central High student
- Clinton Riggs, former assistant chief of the Tulsa Police Department
- James Robinson Risner, Korean War Flying ace, Vietnam War POW, double recipient of the Air Force Cross
- Charles Schusterman, oilman, founder of Samson Investment Company; philanthropist, founder of Charles and Lynn Schusterman Foundation
- Albert E. Schwab, World War II Medal of Honor recipient
- John Starks, NBA basketball player
- Patrick Suppes, philosopher of science
- Billy Tubbs, college basketball coach
- R. James Woolsey, Jr., director of Central Intelligence, 1993–1995
