= John K. Gowdy House =

Historic house in Indiana, United States

- U.S. National Register of Historic Places
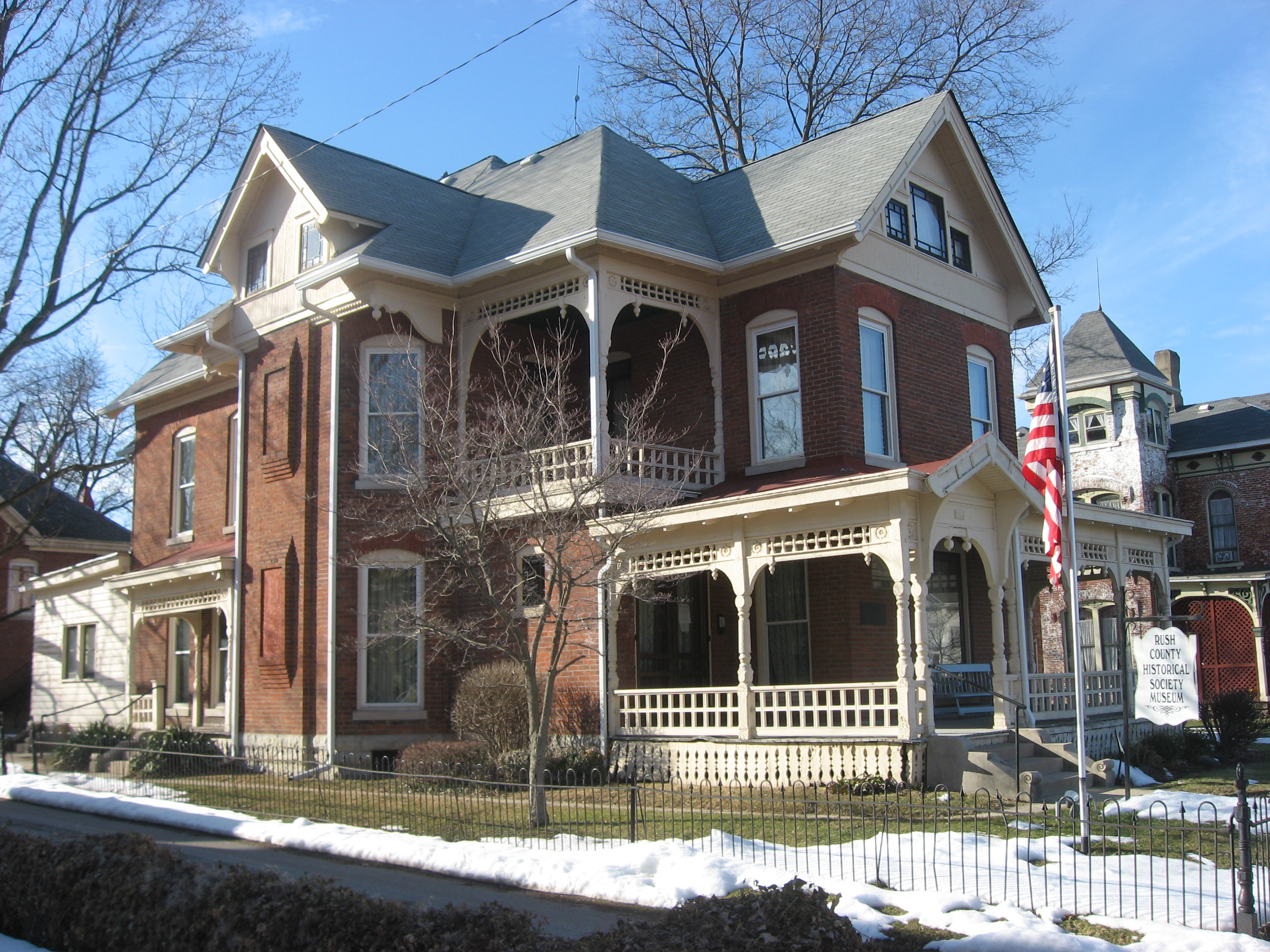
- John K. Gowdy House, March 2010

- Location within Indiana Location within the United States
- Location: 619 N. Perkins St., Rushville, Indiana
- Coordinates: 39°36′49″N 85°26′37″W
- Area: less than one acre
- Built: 1888, 1905-1908
- Architectural style: Queen Anne
- NRHP reference No.: 93001414
- Added to NRHP: December 10, 1993

John K. Gowdy House, also known as the Rush County Historical Society, is a historic home located at Rushville, Indiana. It was built in 1888, and is a two-story, Queen Anne style brick dwelling. It sits on a limestone foundation and has a complex hipped roof with asymmetrically placed gables. It features a wraparound porch and second story porch. Also on the property are the contributing carriage house (1905–1908), summer kitchen (1905–1908), pump, well, and rolled and cast-iron fence. It has housed the Rush County Historical Society since 1940.

It was listed on the National Register of Historic Places in 1993.
