= City Veterinary Hospital =

- U.S. National Register of Historic Places
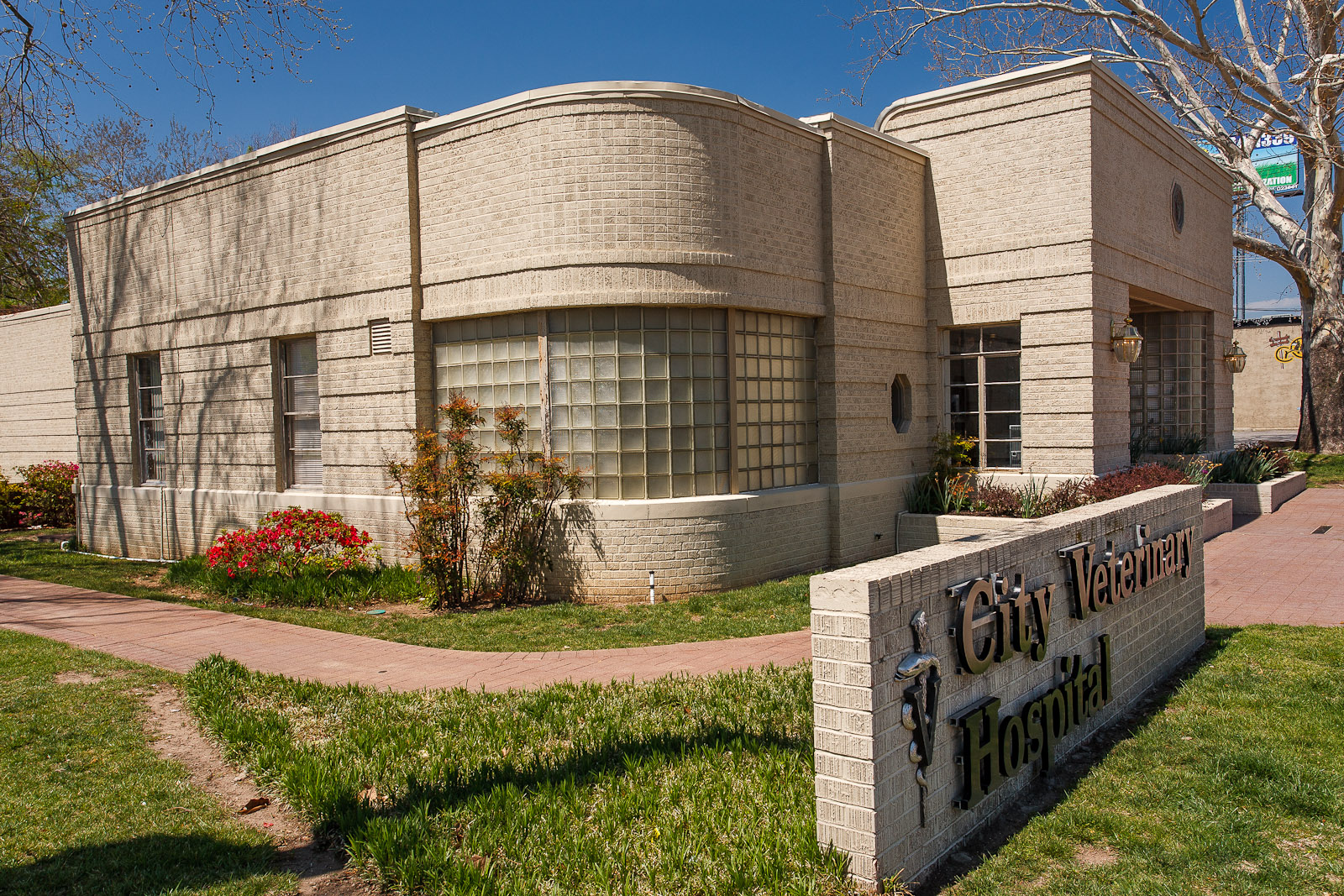

- Location within Oklahoma
- Location: 3550 S. Peoria Ave., Tulsa, Oklahoma
- Coordinates: 36.11181°N 95.97598°W
- Area: less than one acre
- Architect: Joseph R. Koberling, Jr.
- Architectural style: Streamline Moderne
- NRHP reference No.: 08000848
- Added to NRHP: August 26, 2008

The City Veterinary Hospital in Tulsa, Oklahoma was listed on the National Register of Historic Places in 2008.

It has a U-shaped one-story building constructed of light-colored brick in 1942. This is of Streamline Moderne style, with curved surfaces, designed by Hungarian-American Tulsa architect Joseph R. Koberling, Jr. The building still retains many of its original features and fixtures, only undergoing three major structural changes since its original construction.

It was designed and built for Dr. William F. Irwin, a local veterinarian, and as of 2023 was still in use as a veterinary hospital. It was deemed architecturally significant "as an excellent example of the Streamline Moderne style as applied to a small animal facility."

It is located at 3550 S. Peoria Ave. on a corner property. A standalone brick sign structure close to the corner, built later than the building, was recognized as compatible but deemed non-contributing in 2008, and it remains displaying "City Veterinary Hospital" in 2023.
