= Tulsa Club Building =

Building in Tulsa, Oklahoma, US

Tulsa Club Hotel
- Interactive map of the Tulsa Club Hotel area
- Former names: Tulsa Club Building

General information
- Status: Completed
- Architectural style: Zig Zag Art Deco
- Location: 115 East 5th Street, Tulsa, Oklahoma, U.S.
- Coordinates: 36.1524°N 95.9881°W

Technical details
- Floor count: 11
- Floor area: 92,220 square feet (8,568 m^{2})

Design and construction
- Architect: Bruce Goff
- Architecture firm: Rush, Endacott and Rush

Other information
- Number of rooms: 98

The Tulsa Club Building is an 11-story structure that stands on the northwest corner of Cincinnati Avenue and East Fifth Street, inside the Oil Capital Historic District of Tulsa, Oklahoma, United States. (Note: The location put it within easy walking distance of most of the city's major oil company offices.) Designed by Bruce Goff and constructed in 1927 by the architectural firm Rush, Endacott and Rush, it was a joint venture of the Tulsa Club and the Tulsa Chamber of Commerce. (Note: The Tulsa Club was organized in 1925 as a social club, primarily for businessmen related to the oil industry.)

After about 30 years, the Chamber of Commerce vacated its portion of the building, which the Tulsa Club took over. However, the domestic petroleum production industry began to shrink suddenly and sharply, cutting into the club's clientele and revenue. It vacated the entire building and went out of business in 1994. For nearly 20 years the building remained vacant, occupied mainly by squatters and vandals. Extensive damage was caused during this time. A few developers thought they could rehabilitate the structure, but found that it would cost more than they could afford. In 2014 the Ross Group, a company with experience and adequate financial backing from rehabilitating other historic structures, bought the derelict structure and began to turn it into a boutique hotel. The building reopened as the Tulsa Club Hotel in April 2019 as an affiliate of the Curio Collection by Hilton, a chain of boutique hotels. The cost of the renovation was reported to be $36 million.

== Building history ==
Initially, the Tulsa Chamber of Commerce owned 40 percent of the building and the club owned 60 percent. The Chamber of Commerce and other organizations used the lower five floors, while the Tulsa Club occupied the top six floors and a roof garden, which was the site of the inaugural meeting of the Society for the Preservation and Encouragement of Barber Shop Quartet Singing in America (SPEBSQSA), now the Barbershop Harmony Society, in April 1938. The club's portion included large and small dining rooms, a gymnasium, barber shop, and dorm-style rooms for overnight guests. The Grand Ballroom occupied the top floor and was named the Sky Terrace.

The Chamber of Commerce sold its section of the building to the Tulsa Club in 1966, replacing it with a new building on Boston Avenue for itself. (Note: One newspaper reported that the space vacated by the Chamber was rented as commercial offices.) The club continued operating the building until 1994, when it abandoned the structure. By then, the oil business had changed dramatically, shifting its focus to domestic operations in Houston and international operations in New York City. There was a sequence of real estate promoters and developers who bought the structure and described lofty visions for its renewal. The first developer was C. J. Moroney, a California investor who bought the building in 1997. Moroney soon stopped paying taxes on the property. In 1998, after multiple fires and an invasion by squatters, Tulsa declared the building a public nuisance and began billing Moroney for a fine of $1,000 per day pending the building's being brought up to code. When the unpaid fines reached $230,000, the city began foreclosure on the building. During this period, the building survived three significant fires during a two-week period in April 2010, with another large blaze occurring that October. Vandals stripped out everything of value and covered most of the interior walls with graffiti. Many of the ceilings had significant water damage, caused either by rain blowing through broken windows or by fire fighting efforts. The city received no acceptable bids from prospective redevelopers, so it scheduled the dilapidated structure for auction at a sheriff's fire sale.

In April 2013, local businessman Josh Barrett bought the almost-ruined property and announced his own restoration plan, describing a 98-room boutique hotel on floors 1 through 8, retail space and a restaurant on the ground floor, and a bar and restaurant on the 11th floor. (Note: It is unclear whether Barrett bought the building shortly before or during the proposed sheriff's auction, but in either case, Barrett's bid was accepted.) Updated cost estimates for the repair and restoration work apparently were well above Barrett's capabilities, so in July 2014 Barrett put the building up for sale at a cost of $1.35 million. In 2015, a developer known as the Ross Group bought the structure and took charge of the restoration project, planning to repurpose the building into a boutique hotel.

The Tulsa World reported that in 2015, the Ross Group had initially estimated that its own renovation project would cost $24 million. That year, Promise Hotels bought into the project as an equity partner with Ross. By 2018, the estimate had risen to $33 million, with a final cost of $36 million when renovations ended the following year.

== Building details ==
The building was originally constructed with a steel structure, which was then clad in Bedford limestone, laid in a vertical zigzag, Art Deco style. Steel casement windows that opened outward were aligned between pylons of stone to form a vertical stripe design extending the height of the building. The eleventh floor was set back from the main facade, creating a three-sided roof terrace called the "Sky Terrace".

The entry doors faced Fifth Avenue, which slopes downward from Boston Avenue east to Cincinnati Avenue. One entrance was on the ground level, while another entrance, near the western end of the south wall, opened onto the second floor. The second-floor lobby had a combination concierge and reception desk, where visitors could check their coats and briefcases. Then there were three passenger elevators and one service elevator, with human operators. (Note: These were converted to self-service elevators later, after the Chamber of Commerce vacated the building. At the same time, full building air-conditioning was installed.)

Other major changes to the building during the Tulsa Club's tenure include the installation of an elevator at its east end, the construction of a sky bridge across the alley to the Philtower Building on the west side, and a parking garage on the adjacent lot to the north, with its own entrance to the Tulsa Club.

== Project completion ==
When it opened formally on April 18, 2019, the 96-room Tulsa Club Hotel offered more than 7,000 square feet of meeting space, including a ninth-floor ballroom for up to 400 guests, a rooftop meeting space, and a fine dining restaurant, "Le Caveau", overlooking the Deco District. Pete Patel, the CEO and president of Promise Hotels, said the final cost of the project was $36 million. He was also quoted as saying that it was "the most expensive hotel in Tulsa, if not in Oklahoma."

Hilton added the Tulsa Club Hotel to its Curio Collection by Hilton brand.

== Other ==
The hotel was a member of the Historic Hotels of America but in 2022 is no longer listed.
