= Boston Avenue Methodist Church =

Church in Tulsa, Oklahoma

- Boston Avenue Methodist Episcopal Church, South
- U.S. National Register of Historic Places
- U.S. National Historic Landmark
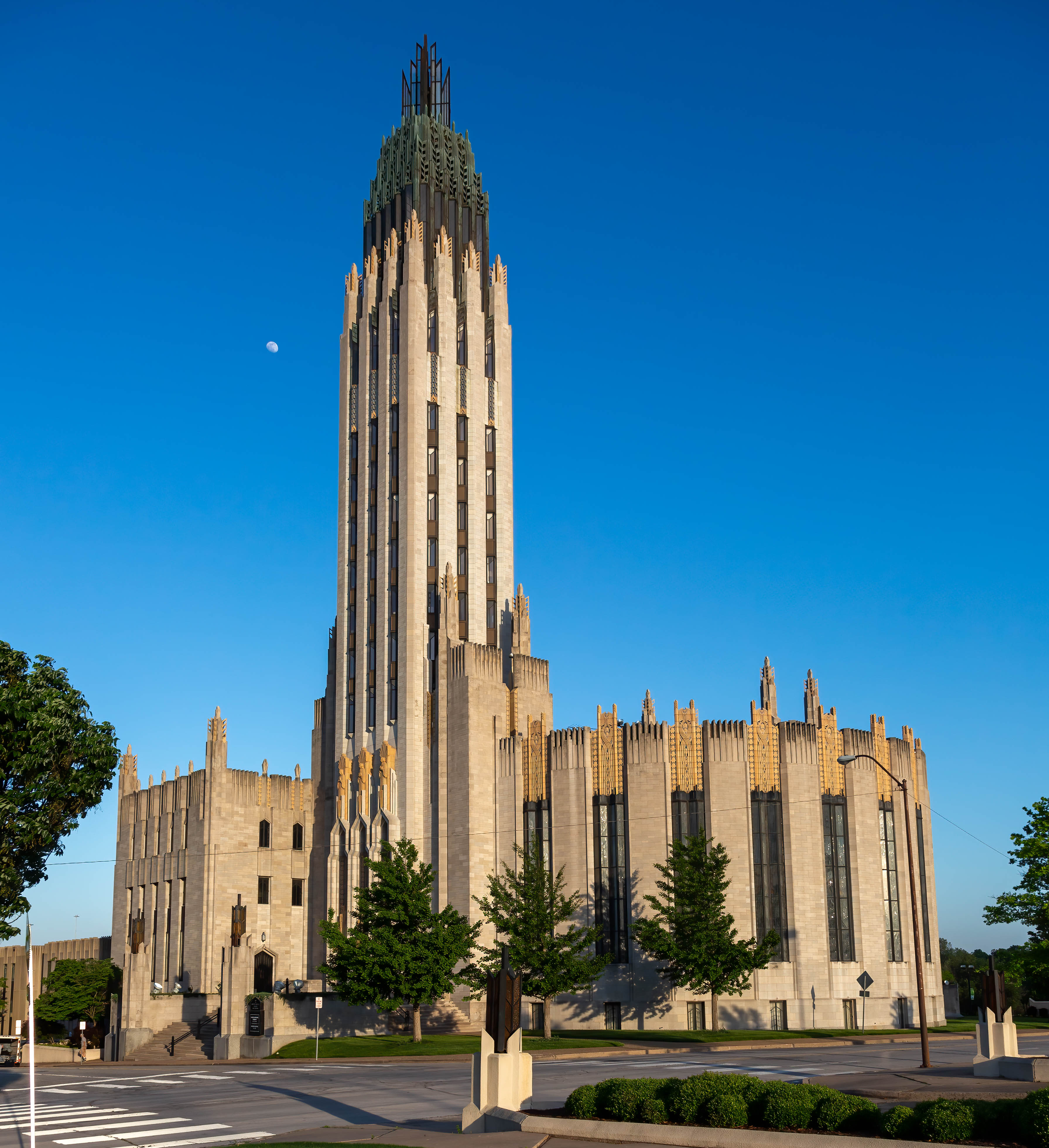
- The church in May 2022

- Location within Oklahoma Location within the United States
- Location: 1301 South Boston Ave., Tulsa, Oklahoma United States
- Coordinates: 36°8′38″N 95°59′4″W
- Built: 1927–1929
- Architect: Bruce Goff from a design by Adah Robinson
- Architectural style: Art Deco
- NRHP reference No.: 78002270

Significant dates
- Added to NRHP: August 31, 1978
- Designated NHL: January 20, 1999

The Boston Avenue United Methodist Church is a United Methodist congregation located in downtown Tulsa, Oklahoma.

== History ==
The design of the US$1.25 million edifice is credited to two individuals: Adah Robinson and Bruce Goff. Robinson was an art teacher at Central High School in Tulsa, and eventually was chair of the art department in the University of Tulsa. Robinson sketched the original ideas for the church. Bruce Goff, formerly one of her high school students, and the architect in 1924–1926 of her home and studio, then took the sketches and came up with the design for the church. Officially, the architecture firm credited is Rush, Endacott and Rush where Goff apprenticed (from age 12 and became a partner in 1930). There is still some debate over who was more responsible for the building. The church credits Adah Robinson with the design of this building, while Goff experts maintain that it is clearly his design. The definitive book on the subject, Tulsa Art Deco [see References, below] says of that issue that "it is not the purpose of this book to offer a resolution to that controversy."

The original building consisted of a semicircular auditorium, a soaring 225-foot (68.5 m) tower, and a wing containing class rooms. The soaring straight lines of the tower provide physical, visual, and philosophical linkage to the Gothic Cathedrals of past ages as well as allowing the designers to indulge in the Art Deco celebration of the vertical.

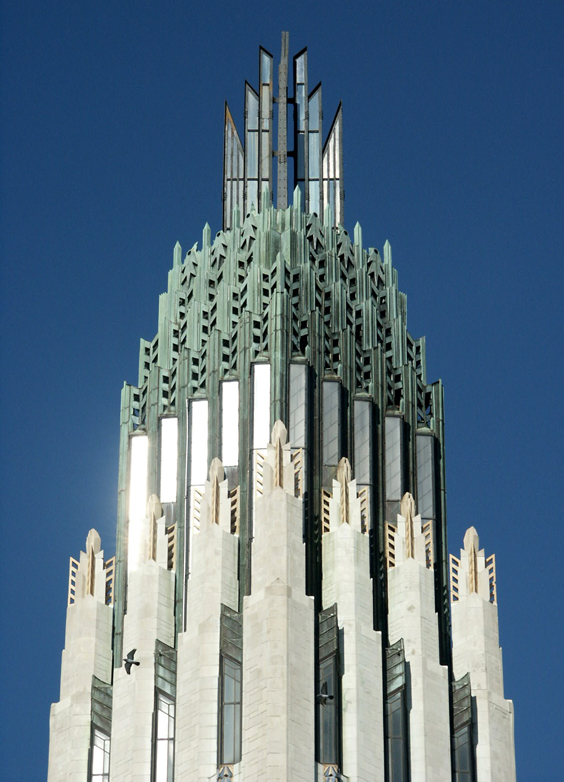
Tower detail

At the top of the tower, as well as on many of the other high points and used much in the same manner that churches in the Middle Ages utilized crockets and finials, is a stylized sculpture that represents two hands raised upward in prayer. This motif of praying hands is one that is echoed throughout the building and is one of the areas of design that can be traced back to the early drawings by Robinson.

While the building is in many ways unique, the idea of the large, semi-circular main auditorium has an earlier precursor in another Methodist church, Louis Sullivan's St. Paul's Methodist Church, designed in 1910 and built, somewhat modified, in Cedar Rapids, Iowa, in 1914.

Like many other Art Deco buildings, the Boston Avenue Church reveled in the use of various building materials, so metal, glass, terra cotta, Indiana limestone and Minnesota granite can all be found. The exterior is decorated with numerous terra cotta sculptures by the Denver sculptor, Robert Garrison, who had been a student of Adah Robinson's in Oklahoma City. These sculptures include several groups of people at prayer representing Spiritual life, Religious Education and Worship. In these groups again can be found the two hands together motif.

Above the south entrance are the equestrian Circuit Riders, statues of the early Methodists engaged in spreading the Good Word. Two of the three riders represent historic individuals, Bishop Francis Asbury, the first American Methodist bishop and Bishop William McKendree, while the third figure, the one in the center, is symbolic of all the other men of God who did His bidding from horseback. The face on this rider was created by Garrison using the church minister's father-in-law, the Rev. T.L. Darnell, of as his model. Rev. Darnell had in fact been a circuit rider for half a century. Over the north entrance of the building there can be found idealized statues of John Wesley his brother Charles Wesley and Susanna Wesley, their mother. Other places on the exterior reveal classic art deco styles organic plant designs, which. like the stained glass windows were based on designs drawn from Oklahoma flora, most notably the tritomas and coreopsis flowers.

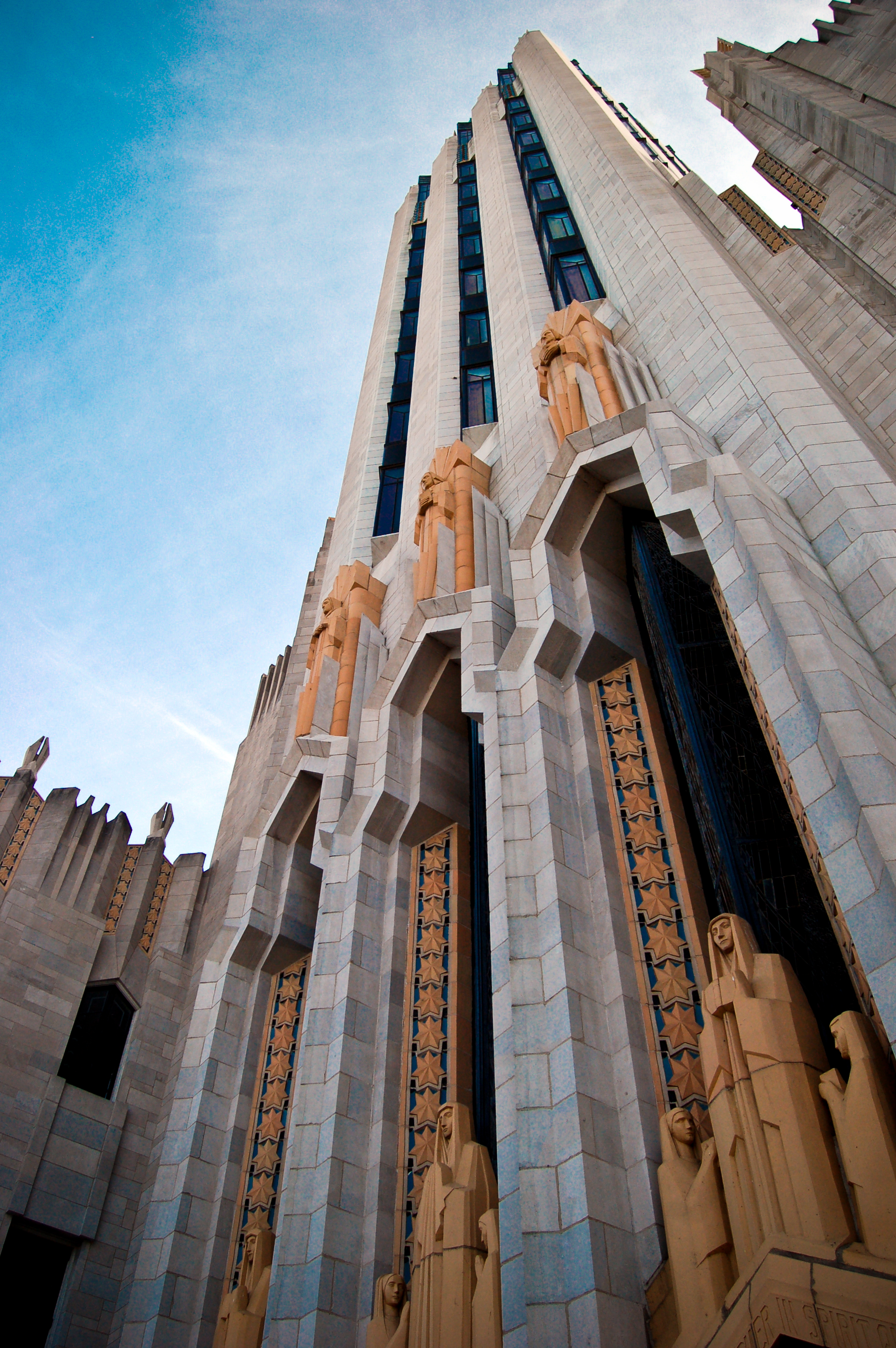
Detail above entryway

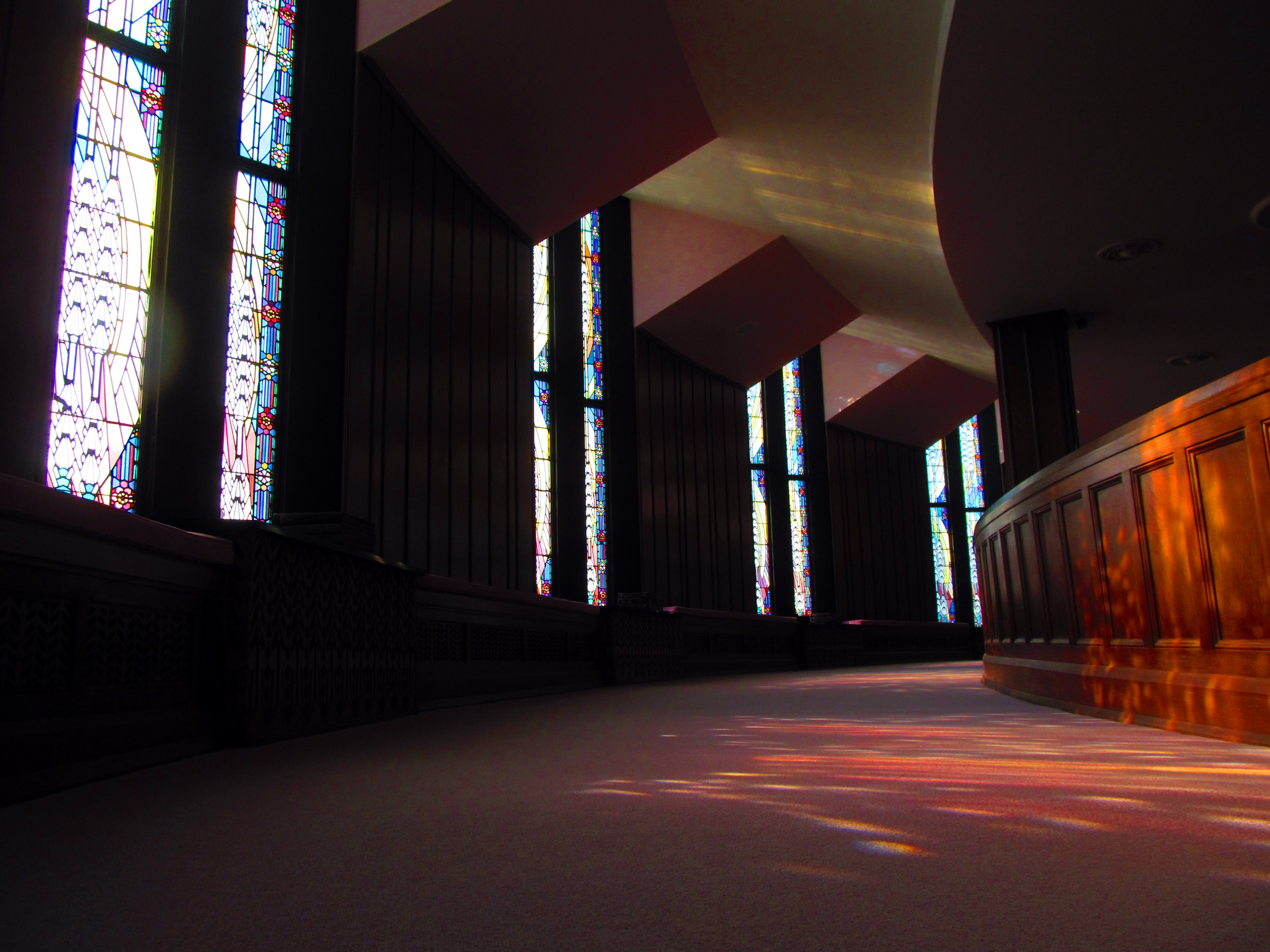
Church interior

The building was not long in making an impression on the architectural world. Influential art critic of the day, Sheldon Chaney, allows it 5 pictures in his book [see References. below] and praises it saying that, "its detail is daringly new, its ornamental idioms fresh and vital, its masses fairly well sculpted and perfectly expressive of the plan," and adding, "But why for the Methodists?"

In 1978 the building was listed on the National Register of Historic Places and was designated as a National Historic Landmark in 1999.

In 1993, murals were installed on the 100th anniversary of the founding of the congregation. They were designed by Chicago artist Angelo Gherardi who continued the Art Deco design to be consistent with the building's interior and exterior design.

The construction of a columbarium inside the building was completed in 2000. Designed by Tulsa architect Roger Coffey, it allowed for the cremains of church members and their immediate family members to be interred there. The columbarium contains a 6-foot (1.8 m) by 25-foot (7.6 m) cut glass window created by Richard Bohm of the Tulsa Stained Glass company.

A stone from the Boston Avenue United Methodist Church is one of the stones embedded in the walls of the Chicago Tribune Building, along with over 100 others picked from historic buildings and famous sites from around the world.

The Boston Avenue Church contains a 105 rank Möller pipe organ, dedicated in 1962 at 72 playable ranks of pipes and expanded in 1986. The organ was further modified in 1995 by Daniel Angerstein. In 1999 a new Trompette-en-chamade was added. A complete stoplist for the organ can be found on the Organ Page for the Boston Avenue Church. The church was built by W. S. Bellows Construction Corporation.

It was designated a National Historic Landmark in 1999. It is considered to be one of the finest examples of ecclesiastical Art Deco architecture in the United States, and has been placed on the National Register of Historic Places. It has 15 floors.

== Beliefs ==
=== Marriage ===
The church has an inclusive vision and celebrates both opposite-sex marriages and same-sex marriages.

== See also ==
- List of National Historic Landmarks in Oklahoma
- National Register of Historic Places listings in Tulsa County, Oklahoma
