= Adah Robinson =

American artist and teacher

- Born: Adah Matilda Robinson; July 13, 1882; Richmond, Indiana
- Died: March 10, 1962 (aged 79); Tulsa, Oklahoma
- Occupations: Artist, teacher

Adah Matilda Robinson (July 13, 1882 – March 10, 1962) was an American artist, designer and teacher, who influenced many other artists, especially architects, during the first half of the 20th century. Born in Indiana, she was educated in art schools in the Chicago area and received private lessons from noted artist there during the late 19th century. Adah moved with her family to Oklahoma City, where she began teaching art. Robinson moved to Tulsa and became the first art teacher at Tulsa High School. (Note: Tulsa High School was replaced in 1917 by Central High School.) One of the pupils in her first class was the aspiring artist, Bruce Goff. Later, she taught another student, Joseph R. Koberling, Jr., who would also become a noted architect. In 1928, she was hired as the founder and chairperson of the Art Department at the University of Tulsa.

Robinson never claimed to be an architect, nor did she have any formal training in the subject. She was primarily a painter and a printmaker, as well as an art teacher. Yet, she is best known for her role in designing the Boston Avenue Methodist Church in Tulsa, which is now a National Historic Landmark and considered an exceptional example of Art Deco architecture, although controversy surrounds whether she or her former student, Bruce Goff, deserves more credit for the church's distinctive design. During her lifetime, many people did not believe that a woman could be responsible for such a work.

In 1948, after a University of Tulsa official disputed her role in the design of the church, she resigned her position at the school and accepted a similar position at Trinity University in San Antonio, Texas. She retired from Trinity in 1959 and moved back to Tulsa, where she continued to work privately. Never married, she died in Tulsa on March 10, 1962.

== Early life ==
Adah Robinson was born to Francis Wills and Catherine Robinson on July 13, 1882, in Richmond, Indiana, where she attended Earlham College. She then studied at the Chicago Art Institute, then with artists Charles Hawthorne, George Elmer Browne, and John Carlson.

Both Adah and her brother were apparently physically frail in childhood. She had been selected as valedictorian of her high school class in Richmond, but an attack of rheumatoid arthritis forced her to miss the event. When she was 23, her brother became very ill, and his doctors recommended that the family move him to Oklahoma, thinking that the climate there would be better for him. Adah stopped her activities in Chicago and joined the family in the move to Oklahoma City. However, both were stricken with typhoid fever. Her brother died and she was left permanently weakened.

Adah began teaching art privately after moving to Oklahoma City. Then she taught at Epworth University (a predecessor of Oklahoma City University) for a short time, before becoming a public school teacher. In 1916–17, she was hired to teach art at Central High School in Tulsa. One of her art students during her first year at Central was an aspiring senior named Bruce Goff, Later, she taught another talented artist, Joseph R. Koberling, Jr., who would become a successful architect in Tulsa.

In 1928, Adah Robinson was hired as the founder and chairperson of the Art Department at the University of Tulsa. She was one of the founders of the Alpha Rho Tau art fraternity, and the Tulsa Art Association. She resigned this position in 1948 to accept a similar position at Trinity University in San Antonio, Texas.

== Robinson home ==
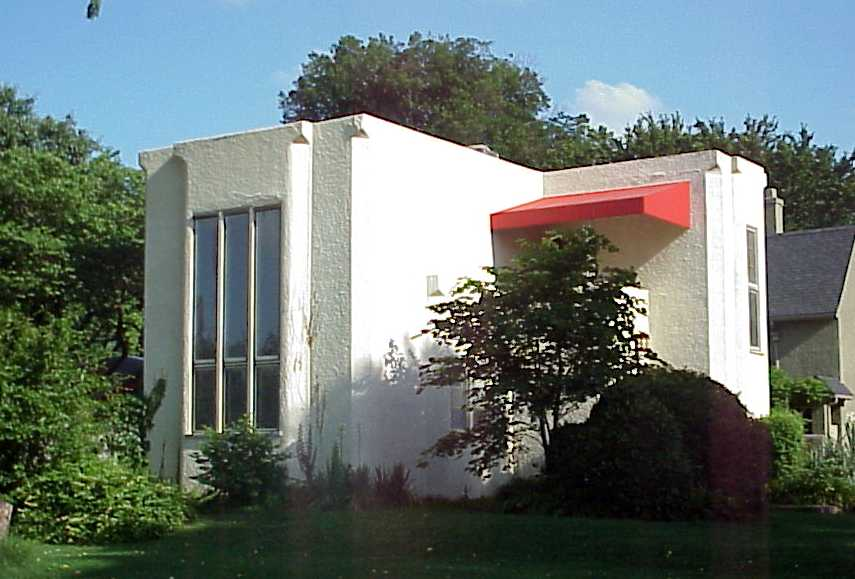
Adah Robinson House in Tulsa

Robinson had her own Art Deco style house built in 1924, with the assistance of her former students, architects Bruce Goff and Joseph A. Koberling, Jr. It is now owned by retired architect Thomas Thixton, who bought it in 1974. (Note: Thixton once was a student under Bruce Goff.) It is a contributing resource to the Tracy Park Historic District in Tulsa. The house is constructed of hollow tile with leaded glass windows and terrazzo floors. The living room is two stories high and has a sunken conversation area with a fireplace. An open balcony runs the length of the room.

According to Thixton, Robinson originally intended to use the building only as her studio, and made it her residence only after adding a kitchen. It offers 1,400 square feet (130 m^{2}) of living space. Thixton has done extensive maintenance since he bought the house, but retained its historic character. He added a sunroom and a carport in 1983. Otherwise, the living room, dining room, two tiled bathrooms and decks have been left as they were in 1924. He had the original stucco exterior sandblasted, applied sealant to the stucco, and covered with a cream-colored paint. He had to replace the roof in 1987, after a tree limb fell on the original roof during an ice storm.

== Boston Avenue Methodist Church ==
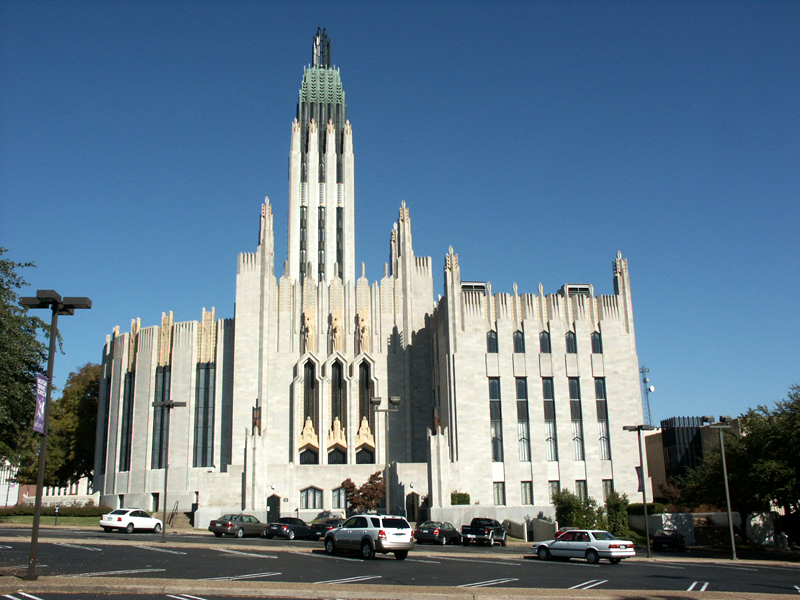
Boston Avenue Methodist Church in Tulsa, Oklahoma

Adah Robinson was probably best known for her design contributions to the Boston Avenue Methodist Church. In 1924, John A. Rice, the minister, appointed a 12-member committee, led by C. C. Cole. Audrey Cole, wife of C. C. Cole asked Adah Robinson for her help with the design. Robinson submitted her drawings for a radically different church design to Audrey Cole in 1926, who asked her to personally explain them to the committee. The committee liked the concepts well enough to consider hiring a professional architect to execute them, however, most established architects thought the concepts were too radical for a church and declined to bid on the work. Robinson then recommended that the board consider hiring her friend and former student, Bruce Goff, then working for Rush, Endacott and Rush. The contracts were signed July 26, 1926. The contracts stated that Adah Robinson "in charge of all things artistic, both inside and outside the building and for carrying out the wishes of the church. She would receive $5,000," Rush, Endacott and Rush were to "furnish preliminary sketches, contract and working drawings, detail drawings and specifications, and provide general supervision of the building operations. They would be paid 5 percent of the cost of the building, not to exceed $25,000."

Goff, a prodigy, had gone to work when he was only 12 years old as an apprentice at Rush, Endacott and Rush. He was working there as a draftsman when the contracts were signed with the church, and was not associated with the design process before then. He later claimed to be the primary designer of the church, and the company supported his claim. In 1930, after the church was completed, Goff was named a partner in the firm. A letter to The New York Times stated that the firm insisted on listing Goff's name as the designer on the church cornerstone. Instead of complying, the church simply did not install the stone. (Note: The author of this letter also stated, "the Boston Avenue Methodist-Episcopal Church is beautifully and extravagantly ornamented and one of the greatest examples of Expressionist-Art Deco architecture in America.")

== Later life ==
During her career, Robinson belonged to the Oklahoma and Tulsa Art Associations, American Federation of Arts, College Art Association, Prairie Print Maker's Society, National League of American Pen Women, and Society of Friends (Quakers).

Robinson continued teaching at Tulsa University. The University awarded her an honorary doctor of arts degree in 1936. She is also credited with redesigning the interiors of two other downtown Tulsa churches: First Church of Christ, Scientist (in 1936) and Second Church of Christ, Scientist (in 1951).

In 1945, Adah Robinson resigned from the University of Tulsa and moved to San Antonio, Texas, where she began developing Trinity University's Art Department. She retired from Trinity and returned to Tulsa in 1959, and continued to work until her death.

Philbrook Museum of Art owns some of her works.
