= Rush County Courthouse (Indiana) =

- U.S. National Register of Historic Places
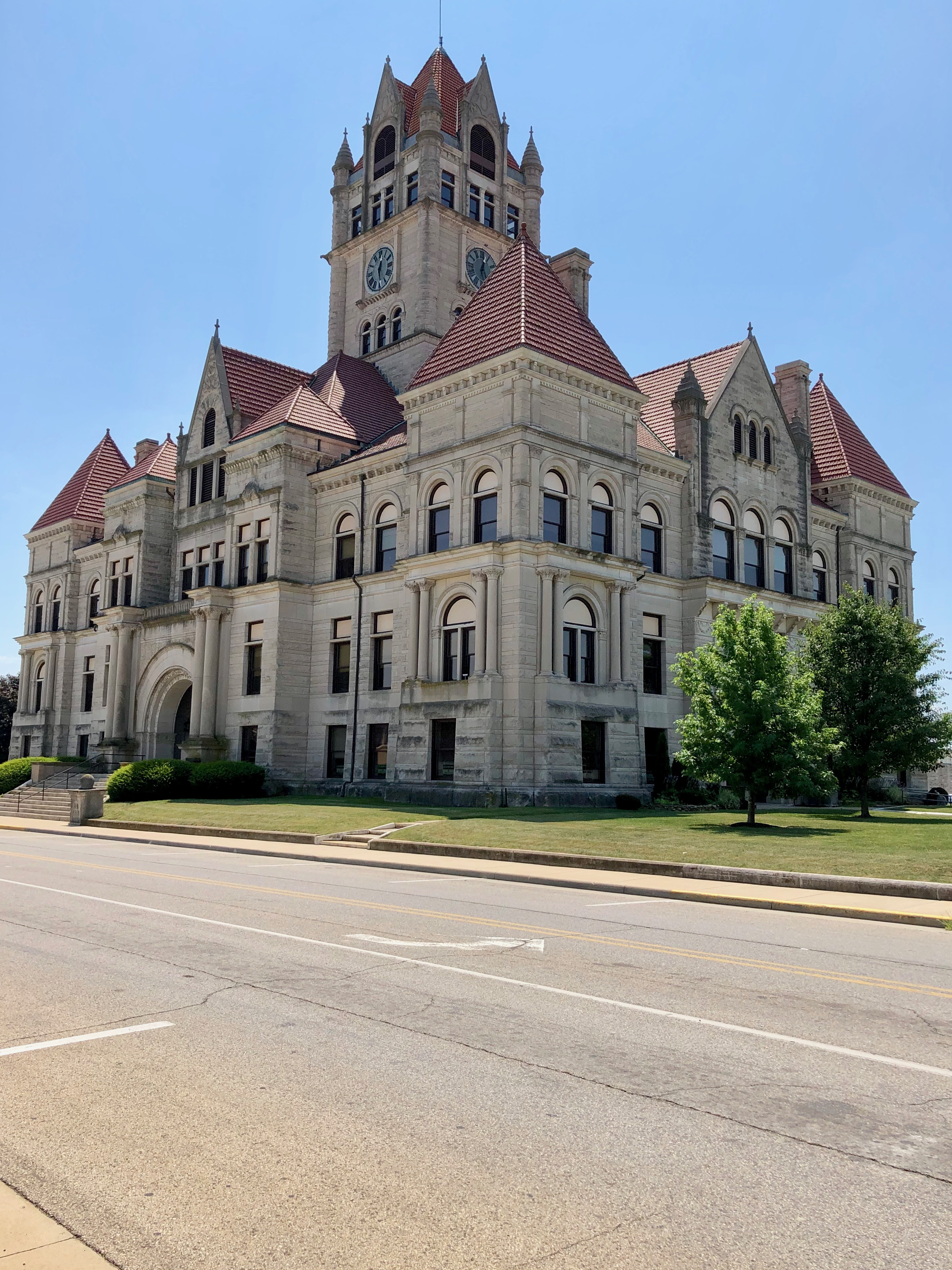
- Rush County Courthouse, July 2019

- Location within Indiana Location within the United States
- Location: Courthouse Sq., Rushville, Indiana
- Coordinates: 39°36′28″N 85°26′39″W
- Area: 1 acre (0.40 ha)
- Built: 1896
- Architectural style: Romanesque, Richardsonian Romanesque
- NRHP reference No.: 75000048
- Added to NRHP: October 10, 1975

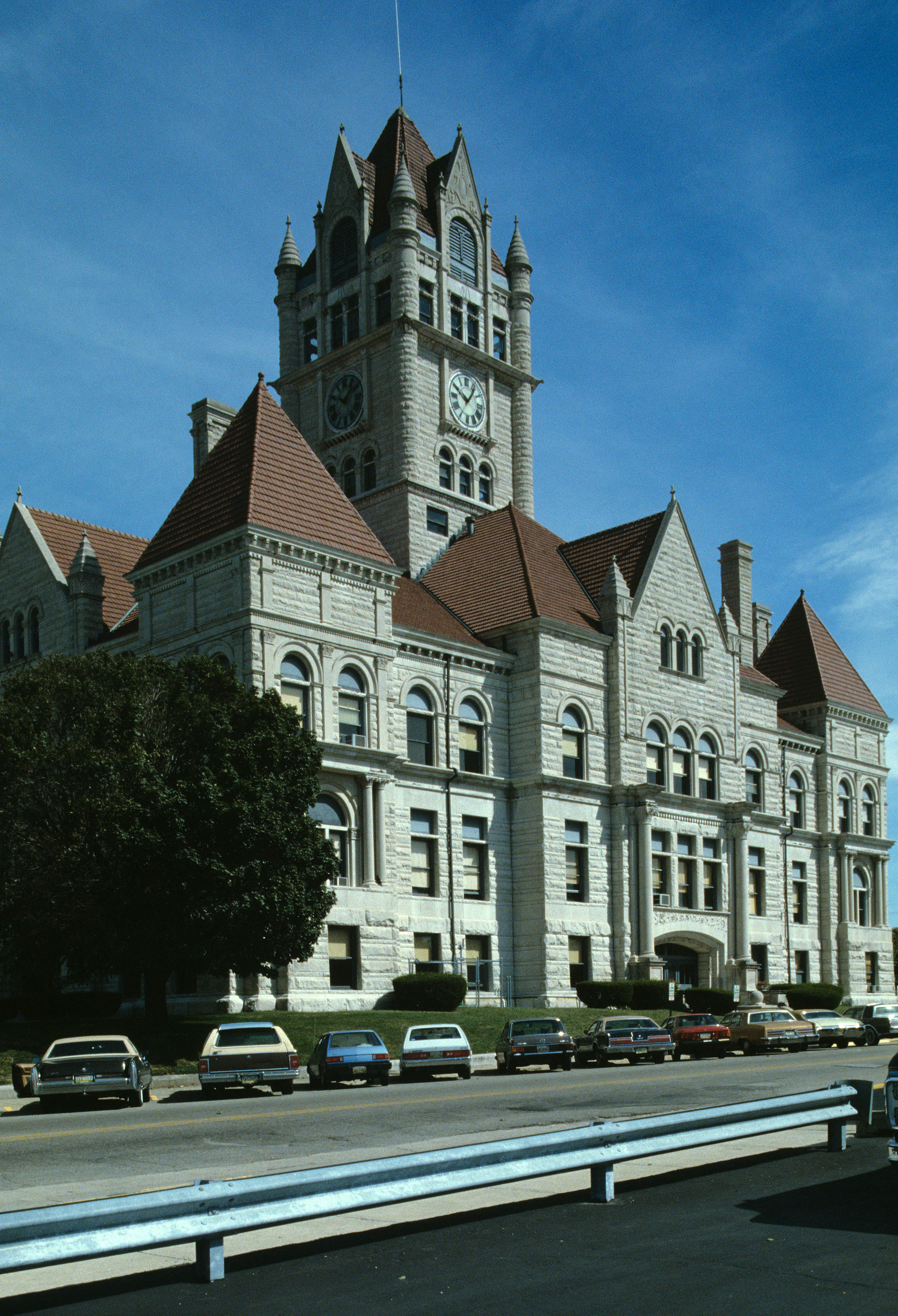
Rush County Courthouse

Rush County Courthouse is a historic courthouse located at Rushville, Indiana. It was designed by the architectural firm of A. W. Rush & Sons of Grand Rapids, Michigan, and was built in 1896, and is a 3 1/2-story, steel frame building sheathed in rock faced stone in the Richardsonian Romanesque style. The irregularly shaped building has four towers at each end of the building with pyramidal roofs. It features a 196-foot tall clock tower with a pyramidal roof and conical turrets.

It was listed on the National Register of Historic Places in 1975.
