= Joseph R. Koberling Jr. =

American architect

Joseph R. Koberling
- Born: May 27, 1900; Budapest, Hungary
- Died: June 8, 1990 (aged 90); Tulsa, Oklahoma, US
- Occupation: Architect

Joseph R. Koberling Jr. (27 May 1900 – 8 June 1990) was a Hungarian-American architect. Born in Budapest, Hungary, he emigrated to the United States, first to San Francisco, then, in 1917, to Tulsa, Oklahoma where he was a student of noted art teacher, Adah Robinson. He was in the first graduation class of Tulsa Central High School. He was then educated at the Armour Institute (later part of Illinois Institute of Technology) in Chicago, Illinois. He received a Bachelor of Arts in Architecture in 1925. He returned to Tulsa, where he began practicing. He received his Oklahoma license in architecture in 1929, which he maintained until his death.

Although much of his work was done solo, he was a principal in three partnerships in Tulsa:

- Redlich & Koberling, 1929-1931 (F. W. Redlich)
- Fleming & Koberling 1933-1937 (Noble B, Fleming)
- Koberling & Brandborg, 1946-1956 (Lennart Brandborg)

Even while he was working outside a partnership, Koberling collaborated with several other architects on notable projects. These included Frank W. Atkinson, Bruce Goff and Leon Senter.

== Notable projects ==
The table below lists some of the projects in which Koberling participated. He created several houses, especially in Tulsa, which are still in use as private residences. In 1924, before he received his license as an architect, he worked with Bruce Goff on the design of a residence and studio for their high school teacher, Adah Robinson. He is probably best known in architectural circles for his work designing Will Rogers High School in 1936. He is credited with designing what he called, "...101 features that we hoped would make an attractive as well as a functional building." This school, still in use, has been called "... one of the best examples of Art Deco high school architecture...in the United States." Koberling collaborated on the project with Frank Atkinson and Leon Senter. Koberling also designed the 1949 addition to the school.

Koberling played an active role in civic life, as a member of the Kiwanis Club, Tulsa Executive Association, and the Tulsa Chapter of the American Institute of Architects, serving as president of the Tulsa chapter. He was a member of the Tulsa Boys Home.

Notable buildings associated with Joseph R. Koberling Jr.
Name	Address	City	Year Built	Architectural style	Architects	Status	Notes
Eastside church of Christ (now called crosstown church of Christ); Medical Arts Building	6th & Boulder	Tulsa	1927	Art Deco	M. Atkinson, architect; J. Koberling, designer	Demolished 1966	
Genet Building (American Airlines Building)	Between 9th & 10th on Boston	Tulsa	1930	NA	N. Fleming, Architect; J. R. Koberling Jr., Designer	Demolished	
Public Service Company Building (Transok Pipeline Company Building)	southwest comer 6th & Main	Tulsa	1929	Art Deco	A. M. Atkinson, Architect; J. R. Koberling, Designer	Existing (Note: Building remodeled, and repurposed for residential use in 2016 and renamed as Art Deco Lofts and Apartments.)	
Palace Theater	Main between 1st & 2nd	Tulsa	1935	Remodel	J. R. Koberling Jr.	Demolished	
Will Rogers High School	3909 East 5th Place	Tulsa	1938	Art Deco	J. R. Koberling Jr. and L. B. Senter, Associated Architects; A. M. Atkinson, Supervising Architect	Existing; listed on NRHP	
John B. McGay Residence	1551 South Yorktown Place	Tulsa Gillette Historic District	1936	NA	J. R. Koberling Jr.	Existing	
City Veterinary Hospital	3550 South Peoria Avenue	Tulsa	1942	Art Deco (Streamline Moderne)	J. R. Koberling Jr.	Existing (as of 2023); listed on NRHP	
Chamber of Commerce Building	southwest corner 6th & Boston	Tulsa	1951	Art Deco	Koberling & Brandborg	Existing	
Oklahoma Osteopathic Hospital	9th & Jackson	Tulsa	1953	NA	J.R. Koberling Jr.	Demolished	
KVOO/KVOO-TV Brookside Broadcast Center facility	37th Street and Peoria Avenue	Tulsa	1951	Art Deco (Streamline Moderne)	Koberling & Brandborg	Existing	
Tulsa City-County Library	4th & Denver	Tulsa	1965	Mid-Century Modern	J.R. Koberling and Charles W. Ward, Associated Architects	Existing	
J. S. Childs Residence	1600 South Madison	Tulsa	NA	NA	J. R. Koberling Jr.	Existing	
Tribune House of Progress	2131 East 21st Street	Tulsa	1923	NA	J. R. Koberling Jr.	Existing	
Blue Jacket High School(Remodel)	NA	Blue Jacket, Oklahoma	1935	NA	Fleming & Koberling	Existing	
Joseph S. Koberling Jr. House	1543 South Swan Drive	Tulsa Swan Lake	1944	French Eclectic	Joseph S. Koberling Jr.	Existing	
William D. Whenthoff Residence	1142 South College Avenue	Tulsa	1935	Art Deco (Streamline Moderne)	Joseph S. Koberling Jr.	Existing	

== Death and burial ==
Koberling died June 8, 1990. His funeral was held at Christ the King Roman Catholic Church in Tulsa. Survivors included a daughter and a grandson. He was buried June 11, 1990, in Rose Hill Memorial Park, Tulsa.
