= Rushville, Indiana =

- City
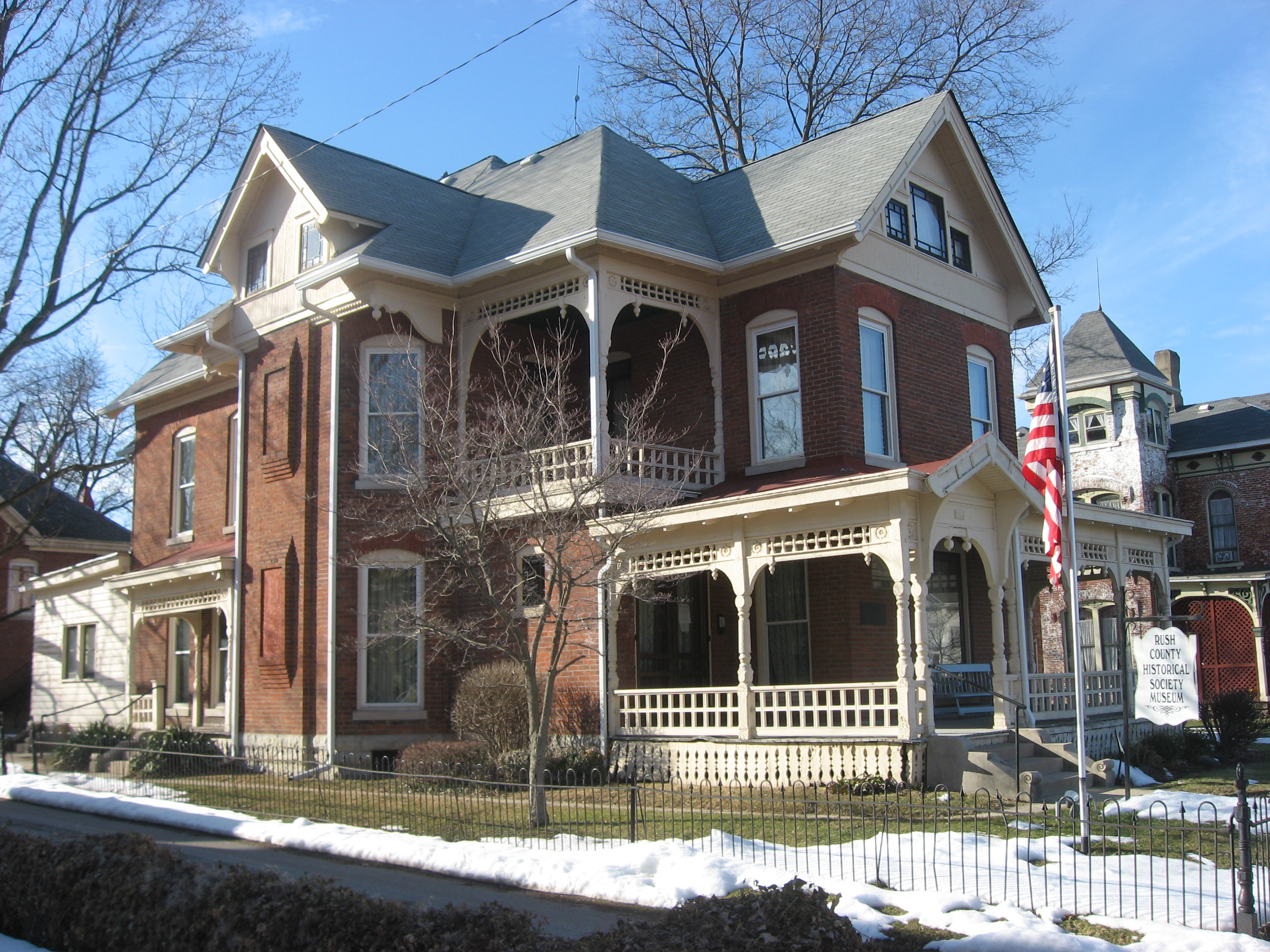
- The John K. Gowdy House in Rushville

- Flag Seal
- Motto: Leading the Way in Rural Indiana
- Location of Rushville in Rush County, Indiana.
- Coordinates: 39°37′32″N 85°26′45″W
- Country: United States
- State: Indiana
- County: Rush
- Township: Rushville
- Established: 1822

Government
  - Mayor: Mike Pavey (R)

Area
  - Total: 3.31 sq mi (8.56 km^{2})
  - Land: 3.31 sq mi (8.56 km^{2})
  - Water: 0 sq mi (0.00 km^{2}) 0%
- Elevation: 981 ft (299 m)

Population (2020)
  - Total: 6,208
  - Density: 1,877.8/sq mi (725.04/km^{2})
- Time zone: UTC-5 (EST)
  - Summer (DST): UTC-4 (EDT)
- ZIP code: 46173
- Area code: 765
- FIPS code: 18-66438
- GNIS feature ID: 2396452
- Website: www.cityofrushville.in.gov

Rushville is a city in Rushville Township, Rush County, Indiana, United States. The population was 6,185 at the 2020 census. The city is the county seat of Rush County. It, like the county, was named in honor of Dr. Benjamin Rush, who signed the Declaration of Independence.

== History ==
Rush County was formed from the unorganized Delaware County April 1, 1822. On July 29 town lots were sold and the town started to form. A school had already been started in 1821 by Dr. W.B. Laughlin, who was a member of the Legislature when the county was formed, and is considered the founding father of the town. A jail was built, Charles Veeder, was the first postmaster in 1822, and a courthouse was built in 1823. The Dog Fennel Gazette was published in 1823. The railroad was built in 1850 and after that a bank, factories, mills, and grain elevators sprang up.

The Rushville post office has been in operation since 1822.

Rushville was the campaign headquarters for Wendell Willkie's 1940 presidential campaign against Franklin Delano Roosevelt. Willkie is buried in the city's East Hill Cemetery.

The Durbin Hotel, John K. Gowdy House, Melodeon Hall, Rush County Courthouse, Rushville Commercial Historic District, St. Paul Methodist Episcopal Church, Booker T. Washington School, and Wendell Lewis Willkie House are listed on the National Register of Historic Places.

== Geography ==
Rushville is located along the Flatrock River.

According to the 2010 census, Rushville has a total area of 3.09 square miles (8.00 km^{2}), all land.

=== Climate ===
Climate data for Rushville, Indiana (1991–2020)
Month	Jan	Feb	Mar	Apr	May	Jun	Jul	Aug	Sep	Oct	Nov	Dec	Year
Mean daily maximum °F (°C)	34.4 (1.3)	38.9 (3.8)	49.9 (9.9)	62.5 (16.9)	72.6 (22.6)	80.7 (27.1)	83.4 (28.6)	82.3 (27.9)	77.0 (25.0)	64.8 (18.2)	50.7 (10.4)	39.5 (4.2)	61.4 (16.3)
Daily mean °F (°C)	26.7 (−2.9)	30.5 (−0.8)	40.2 (4.6)	51.5 (10.8)	62.2 (16.8)	70.7 (21.5)	73.5 (23.1)	72.0 (22.2)	65.5 (18.6)	53.9 (12.2)	41.6 (5.3)	32.3 (0.2)	51.7 (11.0)
Mean daily minimum °F (°C)	19.1 (−7.2)	22.2 (−5.4)	30.4 (−0.9)	40.5 (4.7)	51.8 (11.0)	60.8 (16.0)	63.6 (17.6)	61.7 (16.5)	54.1 (12.3)	43.0 (6.1)	32.6 (0.3)	25.1 (−3.8)	42.1 (5.6)
Average precipitation inches (mm)	3.58 (91)	2.47 (63)	3.51 (89)	4.85 (123)	5.13 (130)	5.09 (129)	4.27 (108)	3.62 (92)	3.10 (79)	3.19 (81)	3.62 (92)	3.18 (81)	45.61 (1,158)
Average snowfall inches (cm)	6.2 (16)	3.4 (8.6)	2.8 (7.1)	0.0 (0.0)	0.0 (0.0)	0.0 (0.0)	0.0 (0.0)	0.0 (0.0)	0.0 (0.0)	0.1 (0.25)	0.3 (0.76)	3.1 (7.9)	15.9 (40.61)
Source: NOAA

== Demographics ==
Historical population
Census	Pop.	Note	%±
1850	742		—
1860	972		31.0%
1870	1,696		74.5%
1880	2,515		48.3%
1890	3,475		38.2%
1900	4,541		30.7%
1910	4,925		8.5%
1920	5,498		11.6%
1930	5,709		3.8%
1940	5,960		4.4%
1950	6,761		13.4%
1960	7,264		7.4%
1970	6,686		−8.0%
1980	6,113		−8.6%
1990	5,533		−9.5%
2000	5,995		8.3%
2010	6,341		5.8%
2020	6,208		−2.1%
U.S. Decennial Census

=== 2020 census ===
As of the 2020 census, Rushville had a population of 6,208. The median age was 40.0 years. 22.9% of residents were under the age of 18 and 18.3% of residents were 65 years of age or older. For every 100 females there were 89.1 males, and for every 100 females age 18 and over there were 84.5 males age 18 and over.

99.5% of residents lived in urban areas, while 0.5% lived in rural areas.

There were 2,587 households in Rushville, of which 29.3% had children under the age of 18 living in them. Of all households, 38.7% were married-couple households, 18.1% were households with a male householder and no spouse or partner present, and 33.2% were households with a female householder and no spouse or partner present. About 31.8% of all households were made up of individuals and 14.8% had someone living alone who was 65 years of age or older.

There were 2,884 housing units, of which 10.3% were vacant. The homeowner vacancy rate was 2.8% and the rental vacancy rate was 9.9%.

Racial composition as of the 2020 census
Race	Number	Percent
White	5,792	93.3%
Black or African American	65	1.0%
American Indian and Alaska Native	5	0.1%
Asian	42	0.7%
Native Hawaiian and Other Pacific Islander	0	0.0%
Some other race	53	0.9%
Two or more races	251	4.0%
Hispanic or Latino (of any race)	119	1.9%

=== 2000 census ===
As of the 2000 census, there were 5,995 people, 2,434 households, and 1,552 families residing in the city. The population density was 2,668.8 inhabitants per square mile (1,030.4/km^{2}). There were 2,597 housing units at an average density of 1,156.1 per square mile (446.4/km^{2}). The racial makeup of the city was 94.5% White, 1.5% Black, 0.20% Indian, 0.85% Asian, 0.05% Pacific Islander, 0.13% from other races, and 3.8% from two or more races. Hispanic or Latino of any race were 2.4% of the population.

There were 2,434 households, out of which 31.2% had children under the age of 18 living with them, 46.9% were married couples living together, 12.7% had a female householder with no husband present, and 36.2% were non-families. 31.6% of all households were made up of individuals, and 15.2% had someone living alone who was 65 years of age or older. The average household size was 2.39 and the average family size was 2.99.

In the city, the population was spread out, with 25.2% under the age of 18, 8.6% from 18 to 24, 28.6% from 25 to 44, 20.2% from 45 to 64, and 17.5% who were 65 years of age or older. The median age was 37 years. For every 100 females, there were 89.0 males. For every 100 females age 18 and over, there were 85.0 males.

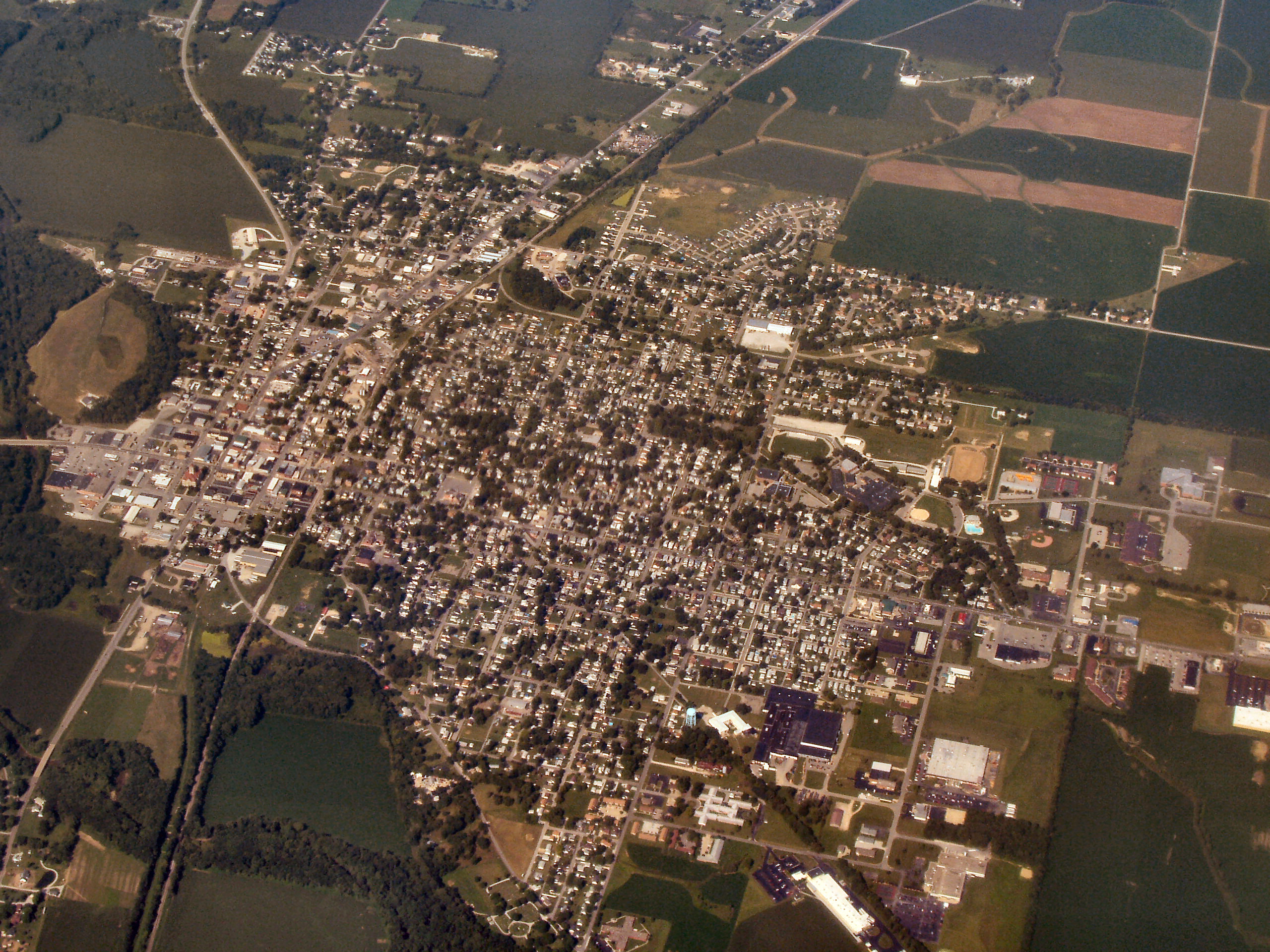
Rushville from the air, looking west

=== Income and poverty ===
The median income for a household in the city was $30,233, and the median income for a family was $36,646. Males had a median income of $30,127 versus $22,440 for females. The per capita income for the city was $17,072. About 8.1% of families and 11.0% of the population were below the poverty line, including 12.3% of those under age 18 and 12.0% of those age 65 or over.

== Education ==
The town has a lending library, the Rushville Public Library.

== Notable people ==
- Samuel Bigger, governor of Indiana
- Carmelita Geraghty, silent film actress
- Gerald Geraghty, screenwriter
- Maurice Geraghty, screenwriter
- Thomas J. Geraghty, screenwriter
- Janet Gray Hayes, 60th mayor of San Jose, California
- Joe Hogsett, politician, 49th and incumbent mayor of Indianapolis, Indiana, and lawyer
- Leonidas Sexton, 19th-century politician
- Knowles Shaw, author and composer
- Tony Stewart, NASCAR/NHRA driver, owner
- Frazier Thomas, television personality
- James E. Watson, U.S. senator from Indiana
- Philip Willkie, politician and businessman
- Wendell Willkie, presidential candidate, lawyer, businessman
- Edward H. Wolfe, Union Army general
