= Gorbunov =

Gorbunov (Russian: Горбунов), or Gorbunova (Горбунова; feminine), is a Russian surname. Notable people with the surname include:

- Aleksandr Gorbunov (born 1990), Russian cosmonaut and aerospace engineer
- Anastasiia Gorbunova (born 1995), Ukrainian alpine skier
- Anatolijs Gorbunovs (born 1942), Latvian politician
- Andrey Gorbunov (born 1983), Belarusian professional footballer
- Boris Gorbunov (1938–2022), Soviet-Russian farmer and politician
- Denis Gorbunov (1977–2006), Russian serial killer
- Dmitriy Gorbunov (born 1977), Russian professional darts player
- Igor Gorbunov (born 1994), Russian professional footballer
- Igor Gorbunov (politician) (1941–2022), Russian politician
- Ivan Gorbunov (1831–1896), Russian writer and stage actor
- Ivan Gorbunov (pilot) (1915–1953), Soviet flying ace
- Kirill Gorbunov (1822–1893), Russian portrait painter
- Nikolai Gorbunov (1892–1937), Soviet statesman and academician
- Oleksiy Gorbunov (born 1961), Ukrainian actor
- Pavel Gorbunov (born 1998), Russian football player
- Sergei Grigoryevich Gorbunov (born 1987), Russian professional football player
- Sergey Gorbunov, Canadian computer scientist
- Sergey Vladimirovich Gorbunov (1970–2001), Russian volleyball player
- Sergiy Gorbunov (born 1994), Ukrainian professional footballer
- Tatiana Gorbunova (born 1990), Russian gymnast and Olympic champion
- Tatyana Gorbunova (born 1995) Russian cross-country skier
- Valeri Gorbunov (1953–1996), Soviet footballer
- Vladimir Gorbunov (born 1982), Russian professional ice hockey player

== See also ==
- Gorbunov and Gorchakov, a poem by Joseph Brodsky
- Lavochkin-Gorbunov-Goudkov LaGG-1 a Soviet fighter aircraft of World War II
- Lavochkin-Gorbunov-Goudkov LaGG-3, another one
