= Henry Buttelmann =

American Korean War flying ace (1929–2019)

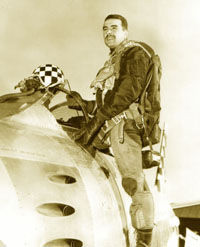
- Buttelmann with his F-86 Sabre in Korea
- Born: June 26, 1929; Corona, New York
- Died: September 16, 2019 (aged 90); Frankfort, Illinois
- Burial place: Abraham Lincoln National Cemetery
- Spouse: Audrey Buttelmann
- Military career
- Allegiance: United States
- Branch: United States Air Force
- Service years: 1952–1979
- Rank: Lieutenant colonel
- Nickname: Hank
- Units: 25th Fighter-Interceptor Squadron; 562d Tactical Fighter Squadron
- Conflicts: Korean War; Vietnam War
- Awards: Silver Star; Distinguished Flying Cross (4); Air Medal (25)

Henry "Hank" Buttelmann (June 26, 1929 – September 16, 2019) was a fighter pilot of the United States Air Force in the Korean War and Vietnam War. He achieved seven victories over enemy aircraft in Korea, making him a flying ace. He gained his fifth kill on June 30, 1953, just after his 24th birthday, which made him the youngest ace of the war.

Buttelmann was born in Corona, Queens, New York City, and attended the University of Bridgeport for two years. He was sent to Korea in December 1952, flying as a wingman in the F-86 Sabre jet against MiG-15s in "MiG Alley", the area around the border between North Korea and China. He shot down his first plane on June 19 of the next year, and he scored his fifth victory eleven days later. He added two more in July, days before the end of hostilities. He served two tours during the Vietnam War, flying the F-105 Thunderchief and F-100 Super Sabre. He retired from the Air Force in 1979 after a career total of 286 combat missions.

== Early life and education ==
Buttelmann was born to German immigrants on June 26, 1929, in Corona, a neighborhood in the New York City borough of Queens. His first introduction to aviation was when he had a neighbor who was an American Airlines pilot.

He began attending the University of Bridgeport in Connecticut in 1948, and he also served as a private in the 514th Troop Carrier Group of the Air National Guard, after having worked as a lifeguard to save for flying lessons. In 1950 he was called to active duty when the Korean War broke out. He then went to Big Spring Air Force Base in Texas and then Nellis Air Force Base in Nevada for three months of advanced gunnery training.

== Military career ==
=== Korean War ===
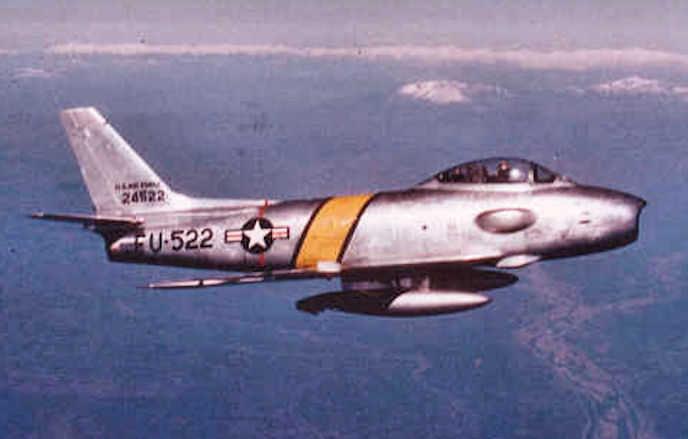
An F-86 Sabre, the type of aircraft Buttelmann flew in the Korean War

He joined the 25th Fighter-Interceptor Squadron of the 51st Fighter-Interceptor Group in November 1952, where he had to be trained in air-to-air combat because he had only learned air-to-ground at Nellis. He was sent to Suwon Air Base, South Korea, on December 23, where he completed several check flights in the F-86 Sabre before doing his first combat mission on January 15, 1953.

He flew in "MiG Alley", the nickname given to the area around the border between North Korea and China near the Yalu River where American pilots fought Chinese, Soviet, and North Korean MiG-15 planes. The war was winding down into a stalemate by the time Buttelmann arrived, so there were few MiGs in the skies. Because of this, he flew aggressively, venturing north of the Yalu, into Chinese territory, but he still only saw MiGs twice during his first five months, when he was a wingman. On his 50th mission, he came across a formation of MiGs but had to break off because he had reached "bingo" state, which meant he was below the minimum 1,200 pounds (540 kg) of fuel needed to get back to base safely. The airstrip was covered in clouds when he returned, and Buttelmann said he was lucky to have been able to land in those conditions while low on fuel.

On June 19, his 55th mission and first as an element leader (which meant he was in the shooting position), he made his first kill.

His fifth victory came on June 30, 1953, making him a flying ace. He was the USAF's 36th ace and the youngest ace of the war at 24 years and 4 days.

On July 19, he was in a flight of four F-86s led by future astronaut John Glenn that ran into a group of MiGs. In the ensuing skirmish, Glenn, Buttelmann, and Glenn's wingman were each credited with a victory. Glenn said that "the MiGs' tactics were so poor I could only imagine it was a training flight, or they were low on fuel, but we were unbelievably lucky". In another flight with Glenn three days later, he scored his seventh and final victory—also the last day of aerial combat in the war. After coming home from Korea with 65 combat missions, Buttelmann returned to Nellis to serve as an instructor.

=== Vietnam War ===
Buttelmann was stationed at McConnell Air Force Base in Kansas when he was sent to Takhli Royal Thai Air Force Base in Thailand in April 1965, after the outbreak of the Vietnam War. As part of the 562d Tactical Fighter Squadron, he logged 46 missions in the F-105 Thunderchief during his four-month deployment. In May 1969, he returned for a twelve-month second tour of duty. In the F-100 Super Sabre, he flew 232 combat missions while commanding the Misty Forward Air Controllers and the 308th Tactical Fighter Squadron.

He retired from the Air Force in October 1979 as a lieutenant colonel, having flown 286 combat missions over the two wars.

== Later life ==
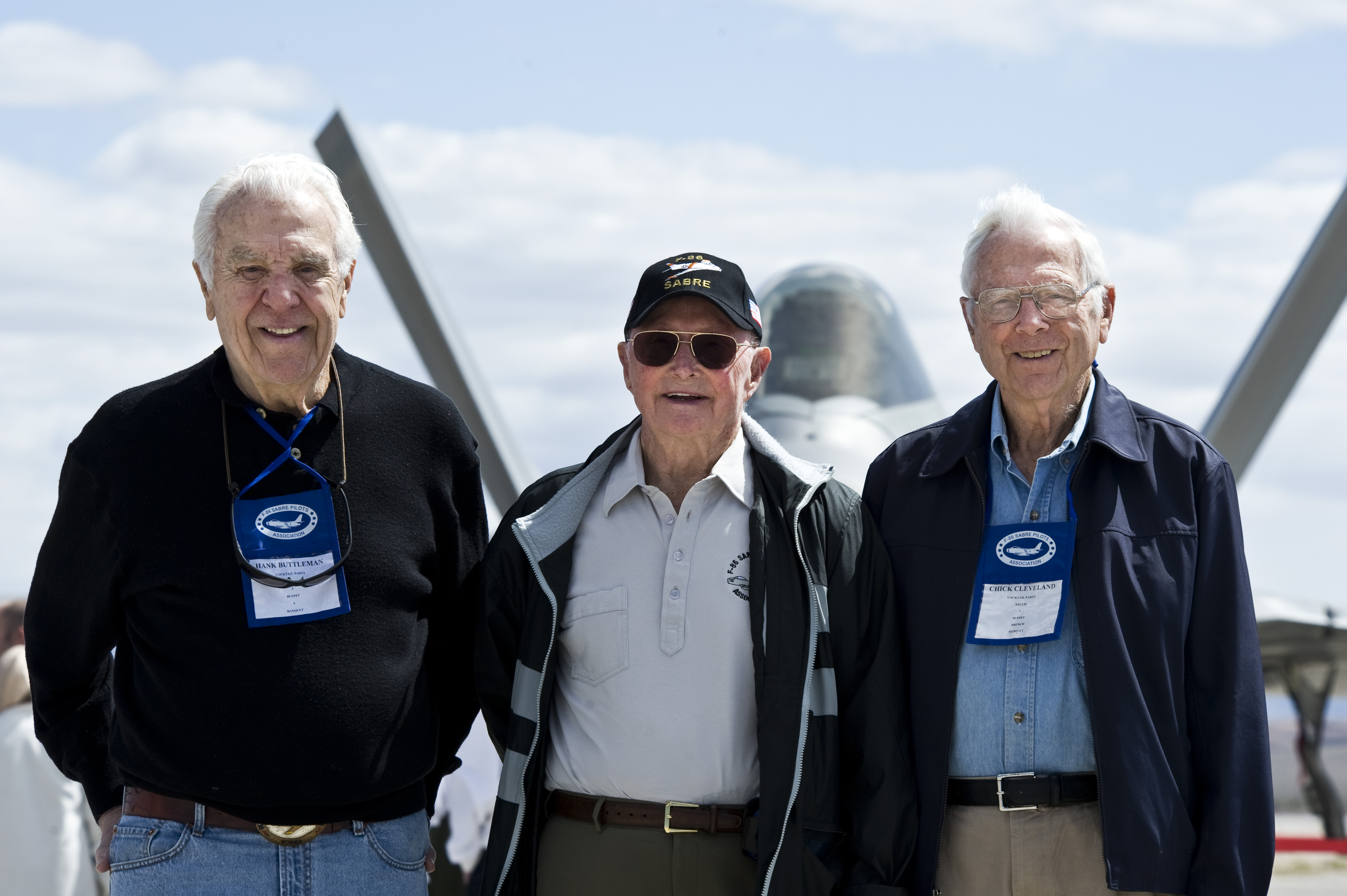
Buttelmann (left), along with fellow aces Cecil G. Foster and Charles G. Cleveland, at Nellis Air Force Base in 2013

In May 2015, he was awarded the Congressional Gold Medal by Nevada Senator Dean Heller for "his role as an American Fighter Ace during the Korean and Vietnam Wars".

Buttelmann died on September 16, 2019, at the age of 90. He died in Frankfort, Illinois, where he and his wife, Audrey Buttelmann, moved in 2018. Buttelmann was one of two surviving Korean War aces when he died; the other is Charles G. Cleveland Buttelmann was interred at Abraham Lincoln National Cemetery.

== Awards and decorations ==
His decorations include:

US Air Force Command Pilot Badge

Silver Star
Distinguished Flying Cross with ”V” device and three bronze oak leaf clusters
Air Medal with four silver oak leaf clusters
Air Medal with three bronze oak leaf clusters (second ribbon required for accouterment spacing)
Air Force Commendation Medal
National Defense Service Medal with bronze service star
Korean Service Medal with bronze campaign star
Vietnam Service Medal with four bronze campaign stars
Air Force Longevity Service Award with silver leaf cluster
Republic of Korea Presidential Unit Citation
Republic of Vietnam Gallantry Cross
United Nations Service Medal for Korea
Vietnam Campaign Medal
Korean War Service Medal

== Aerial victory credits ==
Throughout his career, Buttelmann was credited with seven victories, all of them in the Korean War.

Date	No.	Type	Location	Aircraft flown	Unit
June 19, 1953	1	MiG-15	Uiju, North Korea	F-86 Sabre	25 FIS
June 22, 1953	1	MiG-15	Yangsi, North Korea	F-86 Sabre	25 FIS
June 27, 1953	1	MiG-15	Yonsu-dong, North Korea	F-86 Sabre	25 FIS
June 29, 1953	1	MiG-15	Ch'eyung, North Korea	F-86 Sabre	25 FIS
June 30, 1953	1	MiG-15	Uiju, North Korea	F-86 Sabre	25 FIS
July 19, 1953	1	MiG-15	Sakchu, North Korea	F-86 Sabre	25 FIS
July 22, 1953	1	MiG-15	Tongsong-ni, North Korea	F-86 Sabre	25 FIS

== See also ==
- List of Korean War flying aces

== Bibliography ==
- Thompson, Warren (2012). F-86 Sabre Aces of the 51st Fighter Wing. Oxford, England: Osprey Publishing. ISBN 978-1-78200-743-2.
