= Kenneth Weiss =

Kenneth Weiss may refer to:

- Kenneth M. Weiss, professor of anthropology and genetics at Pennsylvania State University
- Kenneth P. Weiss, American entrepreneur, human factors engineer and inventor
- Kenneth R. Weiss, (born 1957) investigative journalist for the Los Angeles Times
