= William J. Hovde =

American fighter ace

William Johnston Hovde
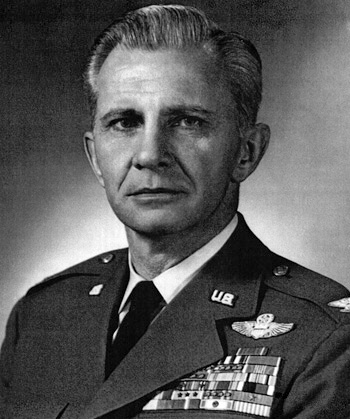
- Colonel William J. Hovde, U.S. Air Force
- Born: April 4, 1917; Crookston, Minnesota
- Died: March 13, 1996 (aged 78); San Antonio, Texas
- Burial place: Arlington National Cemetery
- Relatives: Norma Hovde (wife)
- Military career
- Allegiance: United States
- Branch: United States Air Force
- Service years: 1943–1967
- Rank: Colonel
- Nickname: Billy
- Units: 355th Fighter Group; 4th Fighter-Interceptor Wing
- Commands: 358th Fighter Squadron; 357th Fighter Squadron; 335th Fighter-Interceptor Squadron; Ethan Allen Air Force Base; 14th Fighter Group
- Conflicts: World War II; Korean War
- Awards: Distinguished Service Cross; Silver Star; Legion of Merit; Distinguished Flying Cross (6); Air Medal (10)
- Other work: President of American Fighter Aces Association

William Johnston Hovde (4 April 1917 – 13 March 1996) was a United States Air Force colonel and a World War II flying ace. Hovde served two tours in the 355th Fighter Group and commanded the 358th Fighter Squadron, ending the war with 10.5 victories. He also served in the Korean War, claiming another victory while in command of the 335th Fighter Squadron. After serving as an attaché in Mexico, Hovde commanded Ethan Allen Air Force Base and the 14th Fighter Group. He retired in 1967, and worked in the liquor business before finally retiring and moving to San Antonio. Hovde became president of the American Fighter Aces Association.

== Early life ==
Hovde was born on 4 April 1917 in Crookston, Minnesota to Ole, a Norwegian immigrant salesman, and Lou Hovde. He graduated from Central High School there in 1935 and attended the University of North Dakota between 1936 and 1938, receiving a freshman scholarship award.

== Military service ==
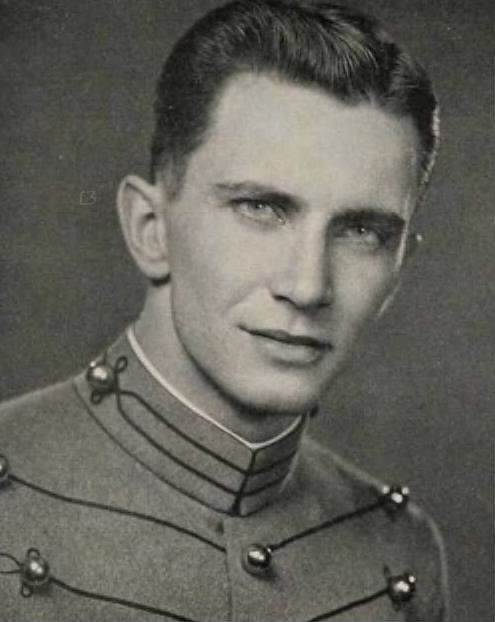
Hovde at the United States Military Academy

He enlisted in the Minnesota National Guard on 1 September 1932 and served with the 205th Infantry until separating from the military on 17 April 1937. He then joined the university ROTC program. Hovde successfully applied for the United States Military Academy and attended the Silverman Preparatory School in New York City after receiving his appointment to West Point. Hovde was entered as a cadet at West Point in July 1939. At West Point, he participated in athletics, including boxing.

=== World War II ===
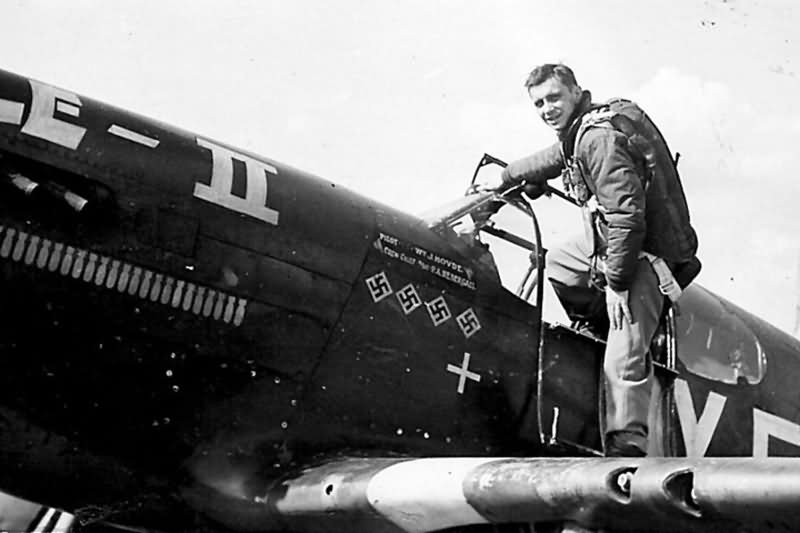
Flying ace William J. Hovde with the 355th Fighter Group in 1944

Hovde entered pilot training and received his wings on 13 December 1942. He was commissioned into the United States Army Air Forces as a second lieutenant on 19 January 1943. He completed Republic P-47 Thunderbolt training at Spence Field. In May, he was assigned to the 358th Fighter Squadron, 355th Fighter Group in England, serving as a flight leader. The squadron deployed to England in July at RAF Steeple Morden.

On 15 February 1944, Hovde was awarded the Distinguished Flying Cross, "for extraordinary achievement", completing 50 missions or the equivalent. Hovde claimed his first air victory as a fighter pilot, a Focke-Wulf Fw 190 over the Münster area, on 22 February 1944. The 358th Fighter Squadron began converting to the North American P-51 Mustang in March. He was promoted to major on 9 March. On 18 March, Hovde flew a P-51 in a penetration and target support mission for heavy bombers attacking a target in Germany. During the withdrawal from the target, Hovde spotted fifteen enemy Fw 190s attacking the American bombers, leading his flight in the attack and claiming one victory. This enabled the bombers to continue their flight back to England. The German fighters attacked again while Hovde reformed his flight. He then shot down another Fw 190. While returning from this action, he was attacked by two enemy fighters, one of which he heavily damaged before running out of ammunition. On 5 June, he was awarded the Silver Star "for gallantry in action".

On 4 April, Hovde claimed a fourth victory. The next day, he received a Bronze Oak Leaf Cluster in lieu of another DFC for completing forty missions and shooting down the German aircraft. In May, Hovde's first tour of duty ended and he returned to the continental United States for rest and recuperation, and then volunteered for a second tour. Hovde returned to the squadron as its commander on 10 July. On 19 July, Hovde downed a German Messerschmitt Bf 109 over Augsburg, becoming the group's eighth ace. On 27 July, he was awarded a second Bronze Oak Leaf Cluster to his DFC, "for heroism and extraordinary achievement", claiming three victories.

He commanded the 358th Fighter Squadron until 2 August 1944, subsequently serving as the squadron operations officer.

On 15 September, Hovde received a third Bronze Oak Leaf Cluster to his DFC, "for heroism and extraordinary achievement", shooting down three enemy aircraft. On 5 December, during a bomber escort mission over Berlin, Hovde led the group in an attack on more than 100 Bf 109s and Fw 190s, shooting down five and sharing a sixth. In this action, his aircraft developed mechanical difficulties and his fuel reserve became critically short. On 13 March 1945, Hovde was awarded the Distinguished Service Cross for extraordinary heroism.

On 30 March, he was awarded a fourth Bronze Oak Leaf Cluster to his DFC, "for extraordinary achievement" in combat missions. Hovde was credited with 10.5 victories in air combat and another damaged, as well as two resulting from airfield strafing. Hovde again commanded the 358th Fighter Squadron between 7 May and August 1945.

=== Interbellum ===
Hovde was deputy commander of the 355th Fighter Group, between October 1945 and March 1946, serving on occupation duty in Germany. In Augsburg, he met Norma Gentner (died October 2000), a dancer whom he married in 1949. Hovde commanded the 357th Fighter Squadron between March and September. He then served with the 71st Fighter Squadron and the 12th Reconnaissance Squadron at March Field for the next two years. In September 1948, he went to Ecuador to serve as an advisor to the Ecuadorian Air Force for P-47 training.

=== Korean War ===
Hovde was sent back to the United States in September 1950. In October, he was stationed in Korea. In Korea, he was an operations officer, executive officer, and the commander of the 335th Fighter Squadron, 4th Fighter Group, flying the North American F-86 Sabre (F-86 Sabrejet) since it arrived in Korea in December. His command of the squadron ended after he was court-martialed in July 1951 for buzzing the Johnson Air Base golf course while the base commander was playing golf. Later that year, he was executive officer of the 4th Fighter-Interceptor Wing.

Hovde flew 44 combat missions in Korea between October 1950 and August 1951, and claimed one victory, a Russian made Mikoyan-Gurevich MiG-15, on 24 April 1951. Hovde was awarded a Silver Oak Leaf Cluster in lieu of a sixth DFC, "for extraordinary achievement" while the commander of the 335th Fighter Squadron in Korea. He returned to the United States from Korea, and attended the Strategic Intelligence School at Fort Myer. In December 1951, he was assigned as the American Air attaché in Mexico City.

=== Post-war ===
He was the American Air attaché in Mexico City until March 1955. On 20 April 1955, he was promoted to colonel. Hovde became operations director of the 4709th Air Defense Wing at McGuire Air Force Base between April 1955 and May 1956. Hovde took command of the 14th Fighter Group and simultaneously was base commander at Ethan Allen Air Force Base until August 1958. He then attended the Air War College, graduating in July 1959.

Hovde served at the USAF Headquarters on the National Security Council's Evaluation Subcommittee in the Pentagon until September 1962, when he entered the Defense Intelligence School Attaché course, completing it in February 1963. Hovde served as air attaché in Mexico City again until retiring on 30 June 1967.

== Later years ==
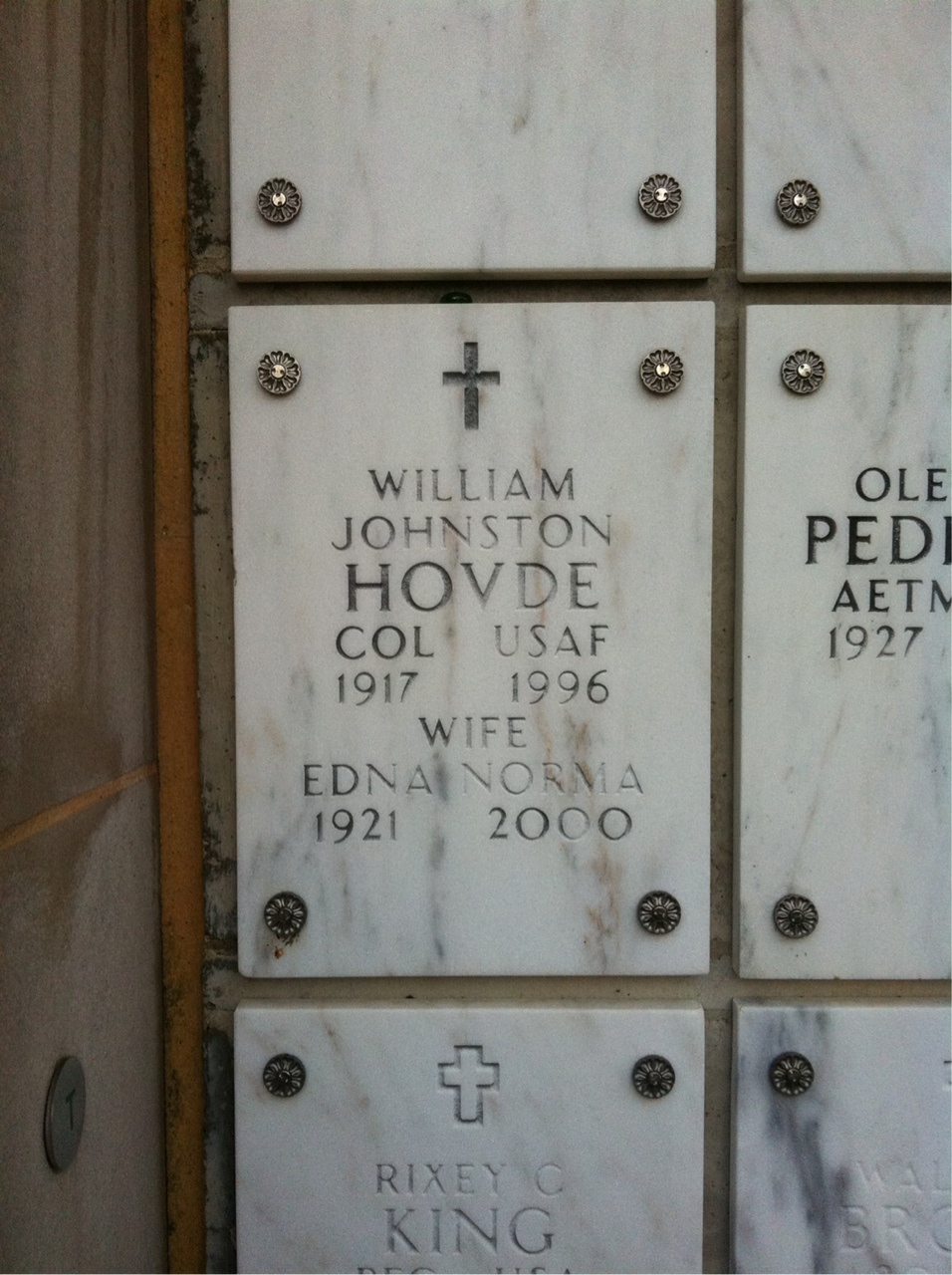
Hovde's tombstone at Arlington National Cemetery

Hovde spent nine years in the liquor business, and then retired to San Antonio. He became president of the American Fighter Aces Association, and died on 13 March 1996. Hovde was buried at the Arlington National Cemetery.

== Aerial victory credits ==
Chronicle of aerial victories
Date	#	Type	Location	Aircraft flown	Unit Assigned
February 22, 1944	1	Focke-Wulf Fw 190	Münster, Germany	P-47 Thunderbolt	358 FS, 355 FG
March 18, 1944	2	Fw 190	Augsburg, Germany	P-51 Mustang	358 FS, 355 FG
April 8, 1944	1	Messerschmitt Bf 109	Brunswick, Germany	P-51 Mustang	358 FS, 355 FG
July 19, 1944	1	Bf 109	Augsburg, Germany	P-51 Mustang	358 FS, 355 FG
December 5, 1944	5.5	Fw 190	Berlin, Germany	P-51 Mustang	358 FS, 355 FG
April 24, 1951	1	Mikoyan-Gurevich MiG-15	Sinuiju, North Korea	F-86 Sabre	355 FIS, 4 FIW

SOURCES: Air Force Historical Study 85: USAF Credits for the Destruction of Enemy Aircraft, World War II and Air Force Historical Study 81: USAF Credits for the Destruction of Enemy Aircraft, Korean War, Freeman 1993

== Military awards ==
Hovde's military decorations and awards include:

Command Pilot Badge
Distinguished Service Cross
Silver Star
Legion of Merit
Distinguished Flying Cross with silver oak leaf cluster
Air Medal with one silver and three bronze oak leaf clusters
Air Medal (second ribbon required for accouterment spacing)
Army Commendation Medal
Air Force Presidential Unit Citation with three bronze oak leaf clusters
American Defense Service Medal
American Campaign Medal
European-African-Middle Eastern Campaign Medal with one silver and two bronze service stars
World War II Victory Medal
Army of Occupation Medal with 'Germany' clasp
National Defense Service Medal with bronze service star
Korean Service Medal with three bronze service stars

Air Force Longevity Service Award with silver oak leaf cluster
Small Arms Expert Marksmanship Ribbon
French Croix de Guerre with silver star
Ecuador Order of Abdon Calderón, Third Class
Republic of Korea Presidential Unit Citation
United Nations Service Medal
Korean War Service Medal

=== Distinguished Service Cross citation ===

Hovde, William J.,
Major (Air Corps), U.S. Army Air Forces
358th Fighter Squadron, 355th Fighter Group, 8th Air Force
Date of Action: December 5, 1944

Citation:

The President of the United States of America, authorized by Act of Congress, July 9, 1918, takes pleasure in presenting the Distinguished Service Cross to Major (Air Corps) William Johnston Hovde, United States Army Air Forces, for extraordinary heroism in connection with military operations against an armed enemy while serving as Pilot of a P-51 Fighter Airplane in the 358th Fighter Squadron, 355th Fighter Group, Eighth Air Force, in aerial combat against enemy forces on 5 December 1944, during an air mission over Berlin, Germany. On that date, while acting as Group Leader on a bomber-escort mission, Major Hovde directed an attack by his group on superior numbers of enemy aircraft. Despite the fact that his aircraft developed mechanical difficulties and his fuel reserve was critically short, he relentlessly pursued the enemy, personally destroying five of them and sharing in the destruction of a sixth. The outstanding heroism and determination to destroy the enemy displayed by Major Hovde on this occasion are in keeping with the highest traditions of the Armed Forces of the United States.
