= Warren Thompson =

Warren Thompson is the name of:

- Warren A. Thompson (1802–1891), explorer and original citizen of Butler County, Alabama
- Warren T. Thompson, American photographer
- Warren Thompson (American football) (born 1963), American football player in the 1987 New York Giants season
- Warren Thompson (boxer) (born 1956), amateur boxing champion
- Warren Thompson (rugby league) (born 1990), professional rugby league player
- Warren Thompson (demographer) (1887–1973), demographer, see demographic transition
- Warren Thompson (fighter)
- Warren E. Thompson, author of military history
- Warren Thompson, the main character of Warren

== See also ==
- Warren Thomson (1935–2015), Australian pianist, music editor, music educator and piano competition juror
