= Lawrence Technological University =

Private university in Southfield, Michigan, US

Coordinates: 42°28′29″N 83°14′56″W

- Former name: Lawrence Institute of Technology (1932–1989)
- Motto: Theory and Practice
- Type: Private university
- Established: 1932; 94 years ago
- Founder: Russell E. Lawrence
- Accreditation: Higher Learning Commission
- Academic affiliations: AITU; NASAD; ABET; MICO
- Endowment: $90.88 million (2021)
- President: Tarek Sobh
- Academic staff: 315
- Students: 3,154
- Undergraduates: 2,314
- Postgraduates: 673
- Location: Southfield, Michigan, United States
- Campus: Suburban 107 acres (43.3 ha)
- Colors: Royal Blue & White
- Nickname: Blue Devils
- Sporting affiliations: NAIA – WHAC (primary); NAIA – MSFA (football); *ACHA Division 3 – MCHC (*men's hockey)
- Mascots: Blue, the Blue Devil
- Teams: 30 varsity teams
- Website: www.ltu.edu

Lawrence Technological University (Lawrence Tech, LTU) is a private university in Southfield, Michigan. It was founded in 1932 in Highland Park, Michigan, as the Lawrence Institute of Technology (LIT) by Russell E. Lawrence. The university moved to Southfield in 1955 and has since expanded to 107 acres (43 ha). The campus also includes the Frank Lloyd Wright designed Affleck House in Bloomfield Hills. The university offers associate, bachelor's, master's, and doctoral programs through its five colleges.

== History ==
=== Early years ===
In 1932, at the height of the Great Depression, Lawrence Tech's founding president Russell E. Lawrence envisioned a new model of higher education that could serve both traditional students as well as working adults, and combined a teaching philosophy espousing both "theory and practice," a phrase that continues a phrase that continues to serve as LTU’s official motto.

Lawrence believed engineering and technological achievements would be what would spur economic recovery, both for the region and the nation. Henry and Edsel Ford agreed to lease their former Henry Ford Trade School building, a part of their Model-T assembly complex in Highland Park, to the new university, which began operations with a few hundred students. The institution's enrollment dropped during World War II but surged immediately thereafter as veterans enjoyed the education benefits of the G.I. Bill. The college established a four-quarter academic calendar in 1935 and scheduled a portion of classes in the evening to accommodate working students.

=== Postwar growth ===
In 1955, Lawrence Institute of Technology (LIT) moved to a campus in then rural Southfield. The Engineering building was chosen as the first building to be constructed at the new campus. The campus master plan was created by professor Earl W. Pellerin, who also led the teams that designed the Architecture and Science Buildings, the university's first residence hall on Ten Mile Road, University Housing-South, and what was originally the president's residence on nearby Circle Drive.

A marker designating the college as a Michigan Historic Site was erected by the Michigan Historical Commission in 1986. The inscription reads:

Lawrence Tech was chartered in 1932 by the Lawrence brothers, Russell E. and E. George. The college was located in Highland Park on Woodward Avenue until 1955, when the first building opened on this campus. Lawrence Tech, founded as an undergraduate college of engineering, later added programs in architecture, management, arts and science, and various technological fields. The college pioneered in scheduling evening programs for working students and in 1935 developed the four-quarter academic calendar. "Theory and Practice" has been the motto of the college since its founding. Application of classroom theories to real situations involving the community or Michigan industries has been its goal. Lawrence Institute of Technology is a nonprofit independent college.

Starting in 1989, LIT began offering multiple master's degree programs through its colleges, in disciplines such as business, architecture, sciences, and technology. In recognition of these post-baccalaureate programs, LIT changed its name to Lawrence Technological University (LTU) on January 1, 1989.

During the 1999-2000 academic school year, Lawrence Tech professor Dr. Chan-Jin Chung founded Robofest, an autonomous robotics competition for 4^{th} – 12^{th} graders. The contest has since expanded internationally, with twenty-six countries eligible to send representatives to a worldwide competition hosted on Lawrence Tech’s campus.

Beginning in 2008, Lawrence Tech opened the Center for Innovative Materials Research. The university's Research + Economic Development department also operates the Construction Safety Research Center (CIMR), Healthcare Violence Reduction Center (HVRC), Healthy Aging Innovation Center, Transportation Institute, and Wearable Technology Innovation Center.

In 2017, Lawrence Tech, in collaboration with the Michigan Economic Development Corporation, launched the Centrepolis Accelerator, headquartered on their campus in Southfield. The accelerator, which has received both public and private funding, aims to provide small manufacturers and hardware entrepreneurs with resources like technical support, expert guidance, and networking opportunities.

== Academics ==
=== Undergraduate admissions ===
Undergraduate admissions statistics
- 2025 entering class
- Admit rate: 81.1 (▼ −1.5)
- Yield rate: 22.2 (▼ −3.7)

Test scores middle 50%
- SAT Total: 1040-1250
- ACT Composite: 22-28

For the Class of 2028 (enrolled fall 2024), Lawrence Tech received 3,412 applications and accepted 2,764 (81%). Of those accepted, 379 enrolled, a yield rate (the percentage of accepted students who choose to attend the university) of 13.7%. Lawrence Tech's freshman retention rate is 75.89%, with 60.84% going on to graduate within six years.

The enrolled first-year class of 2025 had the following standardized test scores: the middle 50% range (25th percentile-75th percentile) of SAT scores was 1040–1250, while the middle 50% range of ACT scores was 22–28.

Fall First-Time Freshman Statistics
	2025	2024	2023	2022	2021	2020
Applicants	3,412	2,980	2,121	2,537	2,641	2,588
Admits	2,206	2,206	1,702	2,078	2,141	2,134
Admit rate	81	74	80	81.2	81.1	82.5
Enrolled	379	390	305	420	475	371
Yield rate	13.7	17.6	18	20.2	22.2	17.4
ACT composite* (out of 36)	22-28	N/A	20-26	22-30	22-28	21-29
SAT composite* (out of 1600)	1040-1250	1040-1250	1020-1280	1020-1270	1030-1280	1040-1250
* middle 50% range

=== Academic divisions ===
School	Founded
College of Architecture and Design	1962
College of Arts and Sciences	1967
College of Business and Information Technology	1952
College of Engineering	1932

The university offers more than 100 academic programs through its five Colleges, Architecture and Design, Arts and Sciences, Business and Information Technology, Engineering, and Health Sciences.

In 1950, associate degree programs were added to LTU's baccalaureate programs and in 1952, what is today the College of Business and Information Technology was established. LTU started offering multiple master's degree programs from the early 1990s. Master's degree programs in business were created in 1989, engineering in 1990, Architecture in 1993 and arts and sciences in 1997. Its most popular undergraduate majors, in terms of 2021 graduates, were:

Mechanical Engineering (68)
Architectural and Building Sciences/Technology (46)
Electrical and Electronics Engineering (43)
Computer Science (41)

=== Accreditation ===
Lawrence Tech University has been accredited by the Higher Learning Commission since 1967.

The College of Business and Information Technology (CoBIT) is accredited by the Association to Advance Collegiate Schools of Business (AACSB). The Bachelor of Science in Chemistry is approved by the American Chemical Society (ACS). Within the College of Health Sciences (CoHS), established in 2023, the Bachelor of Science in Nursing is accredited by the Commission on Collegiate Nursing Education. The Physician Assistant Program, also housed in CoHS, is accredited by the Accreditation Review Commission on Education for the Physical Assistant (ARC-PA).

=== Rankings ===
In its 2027 rankings, U.S. News & World Report ranked Lawrence Tech as tied for #34 in "Regional Universities Midwest." LTU also made U.S. News’ Top Private Schools, Best Value Colleges, Best Colleges for Veterans, and Top Performers for Social Mobility lists among its peer group of Midwestern universities. Lawrence Tech is also included in The Princeton Review's "The Best 389 Colleges" list for 2027.

== Athletics ==
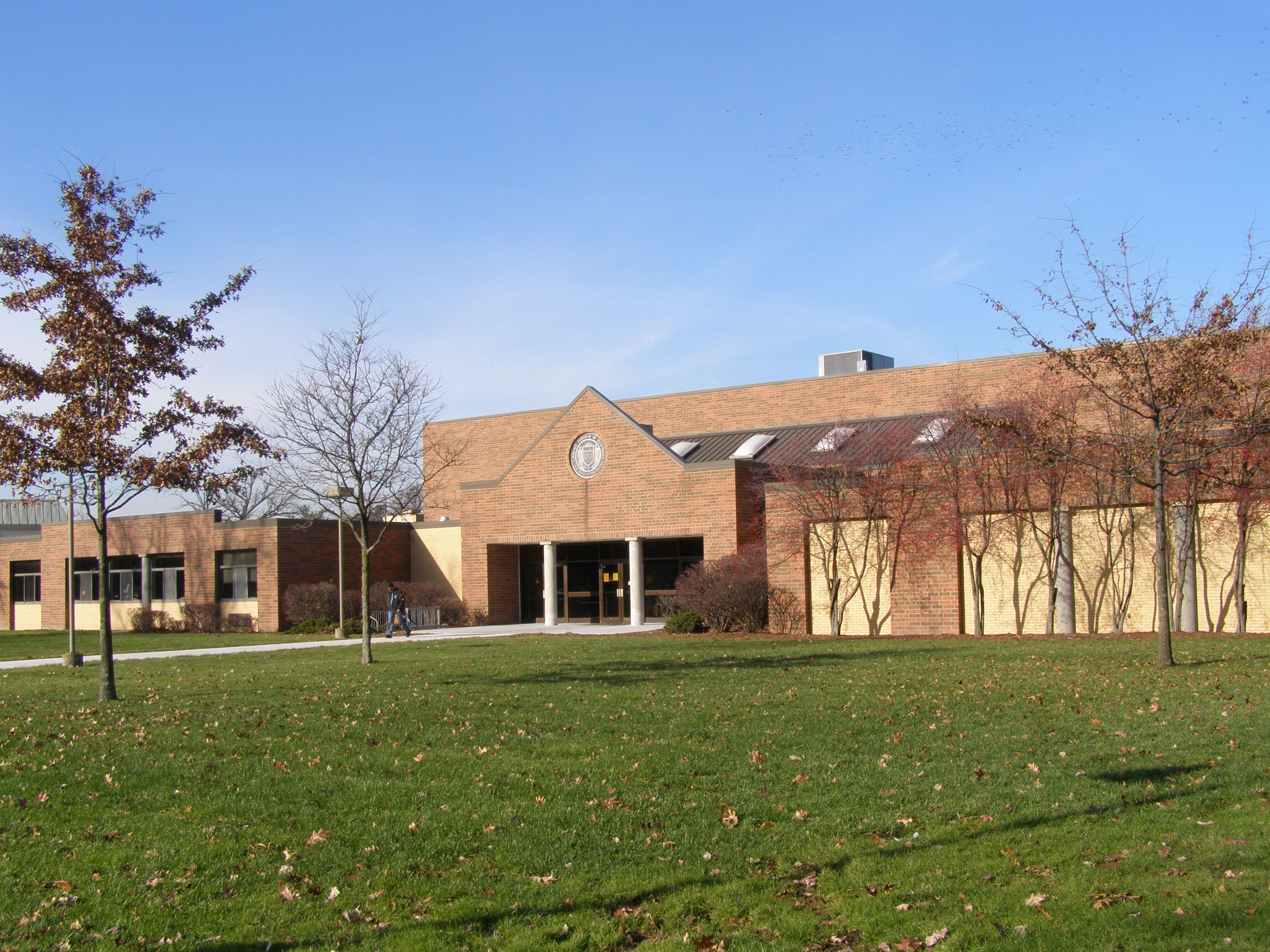
The Don Ridler Field House

The Lawrence Tech athletic teams are called the Blue Devils. The university is a member of the National Association of Intercollegiate Athletics (NAIA), primarily competing in the Wolverine–Hoosier Athletic Conference (WHAC) for most of its sports since the 2012–13 academic year; while the university's second men's ice hockey team is a member of the American Collegiate Hockey Association (ACHA) at the Division III level as a member of the Michigan Collegiate Hockey Conference (MCHC); and its football team competes in the Mideast League of the Mid-States Football Association (MSFA). The Blue Devils previously competed as an NAIA Independent within the Association of Independent Institutions (AII) during the 2011–12 school year (when the school re-instated back its athletics program).

Lawrence Tech competes in 26 intercollegiate varsity sports: Men's sports include baseball, basketball, bowling, cross country, football, golf, ice hockey (D-I and D-III), lacrosse, soccer, tennis, track & field (indoor and outdoor) and volleyball; while women's sports include basketball, bowling, cross country, golf, ice hockey, lacrosse, soccer, softball, tennis, track & field (indoor and outdoor) and volleyball.

=== History ===
Lawrence Tech fielded athletic teams throughout its history from 1930 to 1962. The 1950–51 men's basketball team played the 1951 National Invitation Tournament, held at Madison Square Garden in New York. Lawrence Tech was defeated by Dayton, 71–77 in the opening round of the tournament. Blaine Denning, an alumnus from the 1951 team, went on to play professional basketball with the Baltimore Bullets of the NBA.

Lawrence Tech reinstated athletic programs in 2011 and joined the NAIA. Men's soccer and bowling, along with women's volleyball, joined the already established men's ice hockey team for the university's athletic offerings during the 2011–12 academic year. During its fifth season in the NAIA, the university fielded teams in men's baseball, basketball, bowling, cross country, golf, hockey, volleyball, lacrosse, soccer and tennis, and women's basketball, bowling, cross country, golf, lacrosse, soccer, softball, tennis and volleyball.

Thanks to a $1 million gift from an anonymous donor, during the summer of 2016 Lawrence Tech constructed an AstroTurf surface athletic field at the Point, the part of campus at the intersection of Northwestern Highway and 10 Mile Road. LTU's men's and women's soccer and lacrosse teams began playing on this field in August 2016. The project also includes a 40-car parking lot. In the summer of 2018, lighting for night games, a new scoreboard with a video replay display, temporary seating for 2,000 fans and a press box were constructed in preparation for the inaugural 2018 season of LTU's football team. The first football game, held Sept. 1, 2018, drew an overflow crowd of more than 3,800 fans. Future plans for the site include permanent stadium seating for 4,000 fans, a two-story team building with locker rooms, a weight room, and offices for trainers and coaches, and a concession and restroom building.

In January 2017, Lawrence Tech announced that it would resume intercollegiate football competition, after a hiatus of more than 70 years dating back to just after World War II. The university admitted two recruiting classes of about 90 student-athletes for a team that competed as an independent squad in the fall of 2018, and which began playing a full varsity schedule in the Mid-States Football Association of the NAIA in the fall of 2019. LTU's first head coach was Jeff Duvendeck. The Blue Devils finished 5–3 in their abbreviated first season, and attracted nearly 4,000 fans to their first game on Sept. 1, 2018. The 2021 LTU football squad finished 7–4 overall, 3–4 in the Mid-States Football Association.

In 2021, the university added more teams, including eSports, women's hockey, cheerleading and men's volleyball, and adding to existing programs in women's bowling and track and field. LTU now supports over 30 varsity men's and women's teams in baseball, basketball, bowling, cross country, eSports, football, golf, ice hockey, lacrosse, soccer, softball, tennis, track and field, and volleyball—along with a pep band, a marching band, and cheer and dance teams.

In 2024 Men's Hockey DIII won the ACHA national championship defeating GVS 4–2.

Lawrence Tech’s eSports teams compete within the following titles: Overwatch, Overwatch 2, Super Smash Bros., Tom Clancy's Rainbow Six Siege, Valorant, League of Legends, and Rocket League. In 2026, the Blue Devils claimed a victory in the 2026 Valorant WHAC championship. Also in 2026, LTU entered a partnership with Team Liquid, a multi-national, professional e-sports organization.

== Student life ==
=== On-campus housing ===
Lawrence Tech operates four student housing facilities. As of 2025, 68.9% of first-time, first-year students live in either dormitory or apartment-style units operated by the university.

=== Student organizations ===
Lawrence Tech offers more than 40 student clubs and organizations, including competition teams, Greek life organizations, religious groups, and student interest clubs. Student Government represents all organizations on campus. The university generally allows new student clubs in any interest area if they are supported by a student petition with at least 30 signatures.

=== Fraternities and sororities ===
Fraternities operating at Lawrence Tech University include: Alpha Sigma Phi, Phi Beta Sigma, Phi Kappa Epsilon, and Sigma Phi Epsilon. The sororities represented on campus include Chi Omega Rho, Delta Phi Epsilon, Delta Sigma Theta, Delta Tau Sigma, and Kappa Beta Gamma.

== Notable alumni ==
- Steven A. Ballmer (born 1956), while still simultaneously enrolled in high school, participated in Lawrence Tech's Summer Science Institute, then spent a year at the university, excelling in six of Lawrence Tech's top mathematics classes. Ballmer is the former CEO of Microsoft and current owner of the NBA's Los Angeles Clippers.
- John Z. DeLorean (1925–2005), B.S. Industrial engineering 1948 – Former GM executive who created the first muscle car and an American businessman who founded the DeLorean Motor Company based in Northern Ireland.
- Harvey Ferrero (born 1934), B.S. Architectural Engineering 1955 - American architect, architectural illustration expert, the founder of Ferrero Architects, and a former adjunct professor of Lawrence Technological University.
- A. Alfred Taubman (1924–2015),
- Lewis Veraldi (1930–1990), B.S. Mechanical Engineering 1968.
- Sue Allor, MBA, is an American politician from Michigan. A Republican, Allor has been a member of the Michigan House of Representatives since 2017, elected from District 106.
- Rosemary Bayer, MBA 2003, is an American politician from Michigan and is currently a Michigan senator representing District 12.
- Harold Varner (1935–2013), B.S. 1965, architect in Detroit.

== Presidents ==
The following persons have served as president of Lawrence Technological University:

No.	President	Term start	Term end	Ref.
1	Russell E. Lawrence (Note: Founder)	1932	1934	
2	E. George Lawrence (Note: Brother of Russell E. Lawrence)	1934	1964	
3	Wayne H. Buell	1964	1977	
4	Richard E. Marburger	1977	1993	
5	Charles M. Chambers	1993	January 31, 2006	
interim	Lewis N. Walker	February 1, 2006	June 30, 2006	
6	Lewis N. Walker	July 1, 2006	June 30, 2012	
7	Virinder K. Moudgil	July 1, 2012	December 31, 2021	
8	Tarek M. Sobh	January 1, 2022	present	

Table notes:

== Photo gallery ==
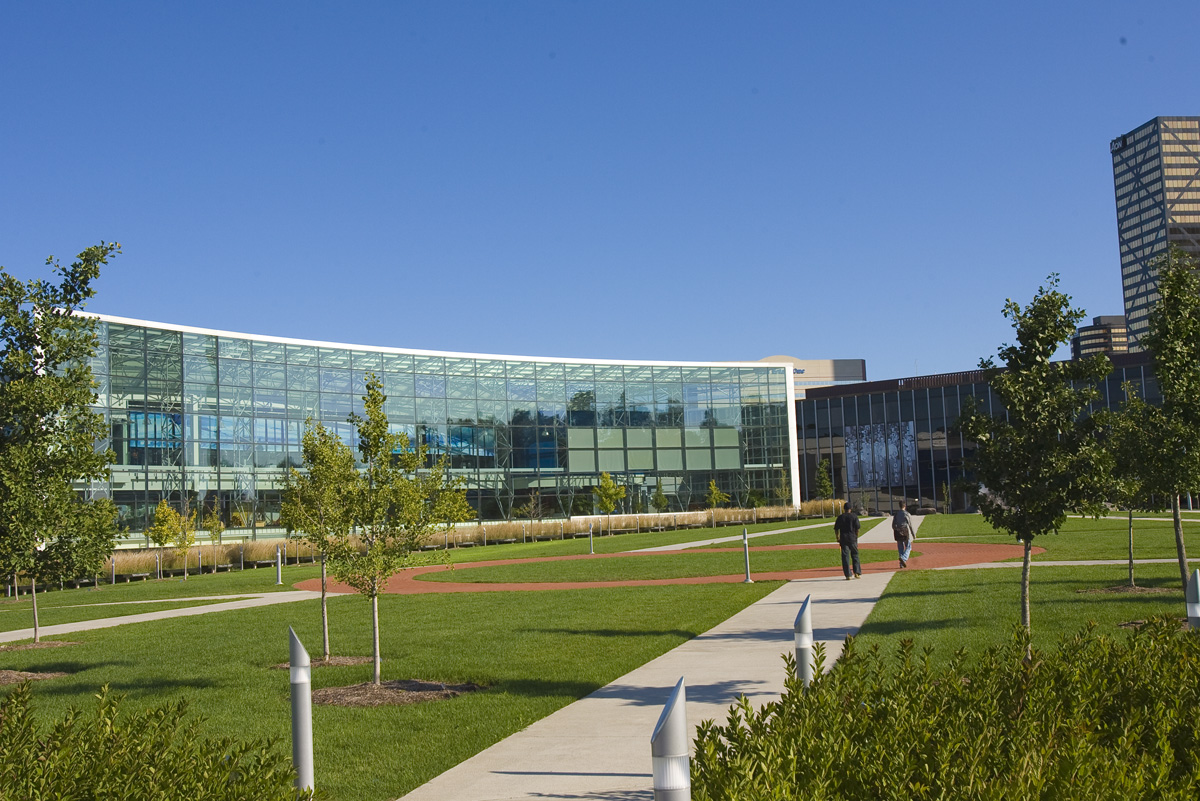
Lawrence Tech's redesigned quad and the Taubman Center.

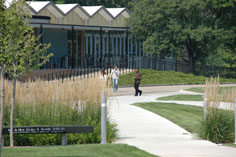
Architecture building.

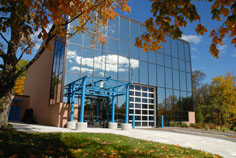
The Nabil Grace Center for Innovative Materials Research.

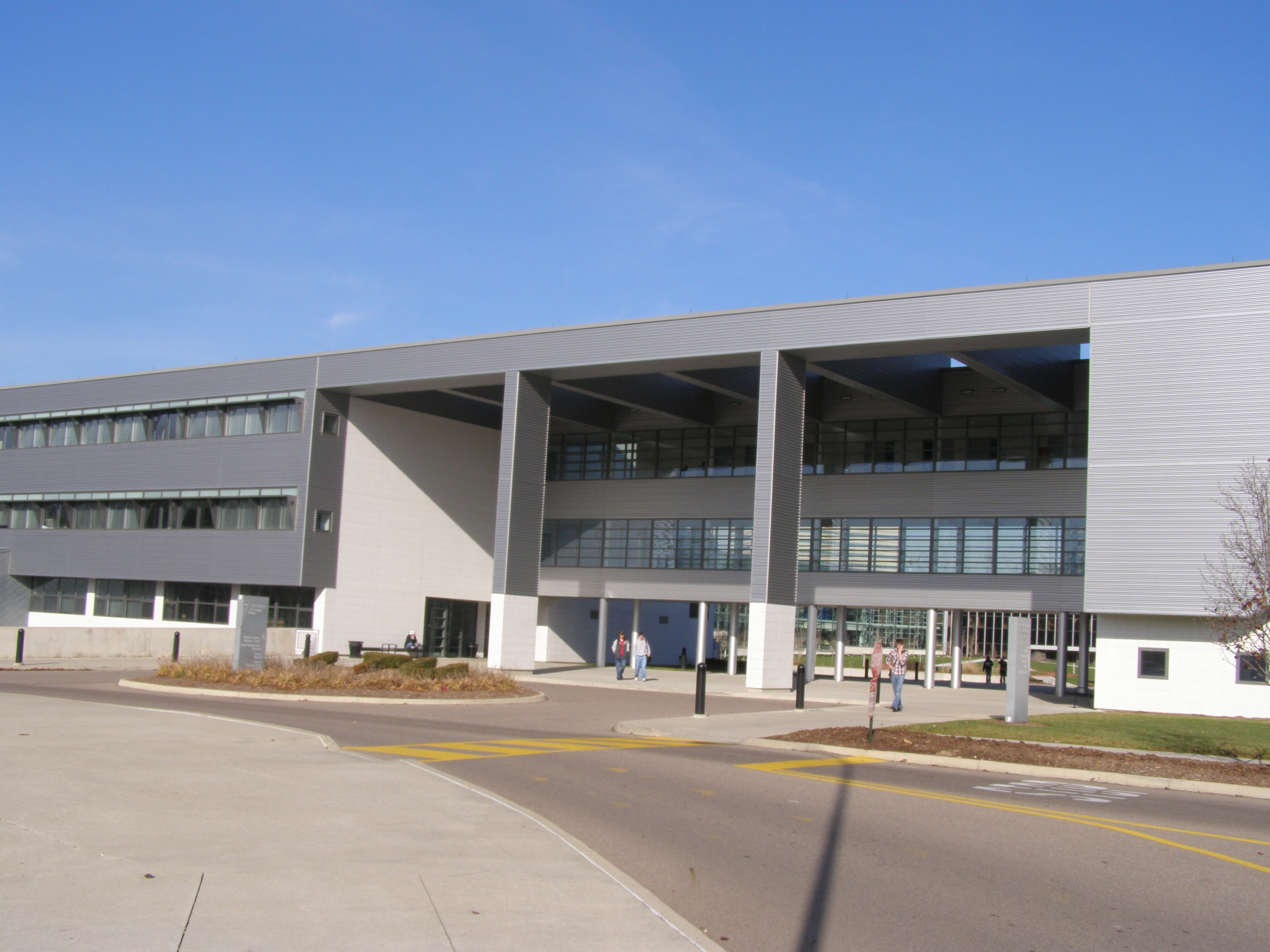
University Technology and Learning Center.

== See also ==
- Association of Independent Technological Universities
