= Charles G. Cleveland =

USAF pilot and Lieutenant general (1927–2021)

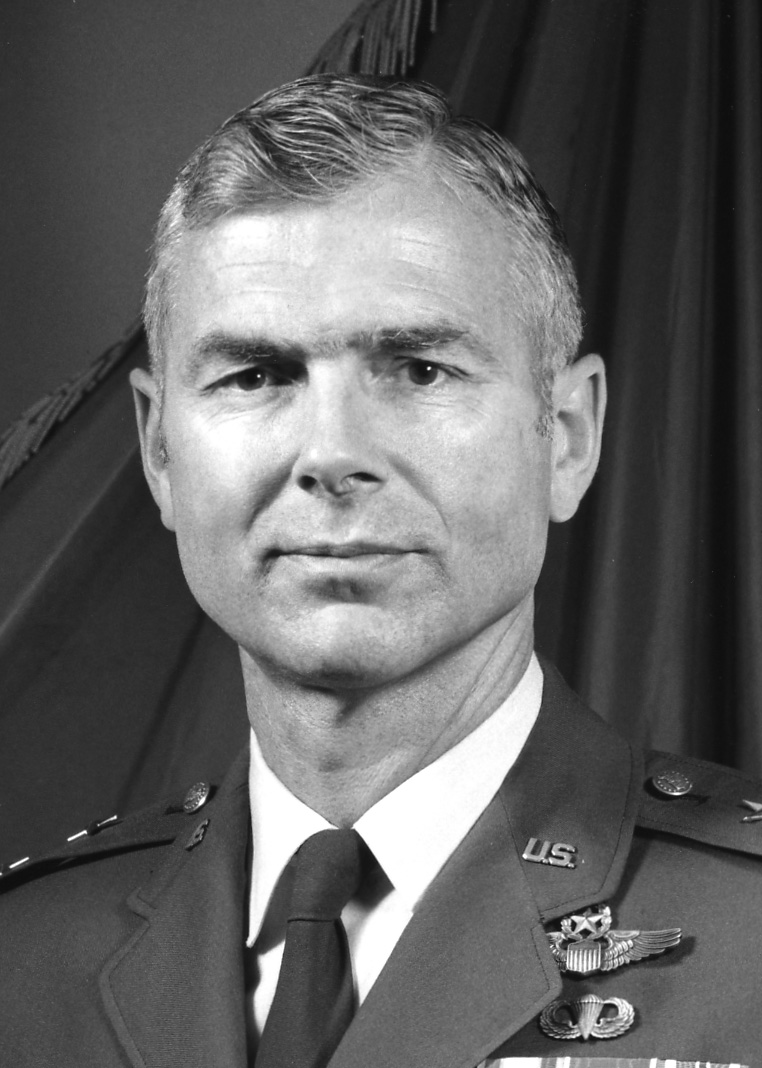
- Born: November 13, 1927; Honolulu, Hawaii
- Died: May 22, 2021 (aged 93); Montgomery, Alabama
- Burial place: Arlington National Cemetery
- Military career
- Allegiance: United States
- Branch: United States Air Force
- Service years: 1949–1984
- Rank: Lieutenant general
- Nickname: Chick
- Units: 334th Fighter Interceptor Squadron; 4th Fighter Interceptor Wing
- Commands: 92nd Tactical Fighter Squadron; 20th Tactical Fighter Wing; 3535th Navigator Training Wing; Air Training Command; Air University
- Conflicts: Korean War; Vietnam War
- Awards: Air Force Distinguished Service Medal (2); Silver Star; Legion of Merit; Distinguished Flying Cross (2); Meritorious Service Medal; Air Medal (4)
- Other work: President of the American Fighter Aces Association

Charles Goold Cleveland (November 13, 1927 – May 22, 2021) was an American Air Force lieutenant general and flying ace who was commander of the Air University, Maxwell Air Force Base, Alabama. He was the longest lived American fighter ace of the Korean War. After the death of Wang Hai in August 2020, he was the last living flying ace from the Korean war. He was the recipient of the Silver Star, the Air Force Distinguished Service Medal and the Meritorious Service Medal.

== Biography ==
Cleveland was born in Honolulu in 1927. He graduated from the United States Military Academy, West Point, New York, in 1949, earned his master's degree in political science at Xavier University, Cincinnati, in 1966 and attended the six-week advanced management program at Harvard University in 1969.

He entered Air Force basic pilot training in June 1949 at Randolph Air Force Base, Texas, and received his wings in September 1950 upon completion of advanced pilot training at Williams Air Force Base, Arizona. He then served as a pilot with the 31st Strategic Fighter Wing at Turner Air Force Base, Georgia.

Cleveland transferred to South Korea in March 1952, where he flew F-86s as a flight commander with the 334th Fighter-Interceptor Squadron of the 4th Fighter-Interceptor Wing at Kimpo Air Base. During his combat tour of duty, he shot down five MiG-15s and was credited with one probably destroyed and four damaged.

He returned to Turner Air Force Base in November 1952, where he again served in the 31st Strategic Fighter Wing. In July 1957 he transferred to Bergstrom Air Force Base, Texas. While there he served in various operations assignments with the 27th Fighter-Bomber Wing, 522nd Fighter-Bomber Squadron and the 481st Tactical Fighter Squadron.

Cleveland went to England in February 1959 as a flight commander and operations officer in the 78th Tactical Fighter Squadron at RAF Woodbridge. From 1962 to 1963, he commanded the 92nd Tactical Fighter Squadron at RAF Bentwaters. He then returned to the United States and served at the Tactical Air Command Systems Office at Wright-Patterson Air Force Base, Ohio, as F-111 project officer. In May 1966 he transferred to the Republic of Vietnam as executive assistant to General William Westmoreland, commander, Military Assistance Command, Vietnam.

Returning to England in June 1967, he became a student at the Royal Air Force College of Air Warfare, the top RAF service school. Upon graduation in December 1967, he went to RAF Bentwaters, England, where he became special assistant to the director of operations for the 81st Tactical Fighter Wing. In July 1968 he was assigned to the staff of Headquarters Third Air Force at RAF South Ruislip, England. He served there as director of tactical evaluation, and then as special assistant for F-111 matters. Cleveland became vice commander of the 20th Tactical Fighter Wing at RAF Upper Heyford, England, in April 1970. During this period the wing converted from F-100s to F-111s.

In June 1971 Cleveland assumed command of the 3535th Navigator Training Wing at Mather Air Force Base, California. He headed the U.S. Air Force School of Navigation there. He transferred to Air Training Command headquarters at Randolph Air Force Base as chief of staff.

In June 1972, he assumed duties as deputy chief of staff for technical training in February 1974. In July 1975 he became director of personnel programs, Office of the Deputy Chief of Staff, Manpower and Personnel, Headquarters U.S. Air Force, Washington, D.C. He was named vice commander of Air Training Command in March 1979, and then he assumed command of Air University at Maxwell AFB, Alabama in July 1981. LGen Cleveland held that position until his retirement from active duty in July 1984.

He was a command pilot with more than 4,300 flying hours, including more than 3,700 in jet aircraft, such as F-80s, F-84s, F-86s, F-100s, F-101s, F-4s and F-111s. His military decorations and awards include the Distinguished Service Medal (Air Force), Legion of Merit, Distinguished Flying Cross with oak leaf cluster, Meritorious Service Medal with oak leaf cluster, Air Medal with three oak leaf clusters, Air Force Commendation Medal, Army Commendation Medal and Republic of Korea Order of Military Merit, Chung Mu.

He was promoted to lieutenant general on August 1, 1981, with date of rank July 28, 1981.

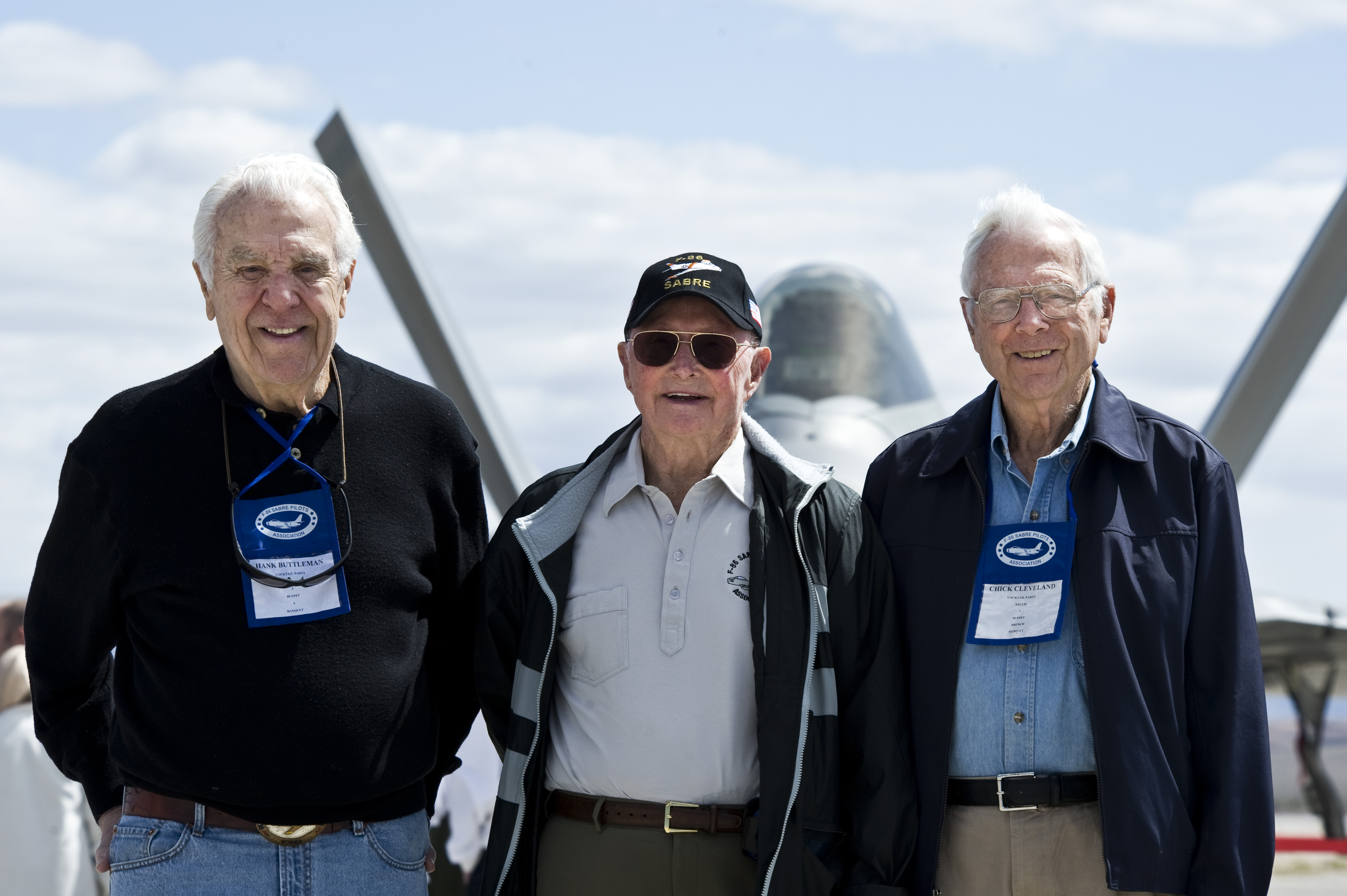
Cleveland (right), along with fellow aces Henry Buttelmann and Cecil G. Foster, at Nellis Air Force Base in 2013

In 2008, Cleveland was recognized by the Air Force as its 40th jet fighter ace of the Korean War 55 years after the armistice of July 1953. Newly discovered documentation from the Russian Air Force, as well as eyewitness accounts by Cleveland's wingmen, provided evidence to support converting one of his 'two probably destroyed' into his fifth confirmed kill from dog fights over Mig Alley during the Korean War.

In October 2008, he was awarded a Silver Star for his actions in Korea on September 21, 1952.

On May 20, 2015, Cleveland was one of 77 American flying Aces to receive the Congressional Gold Medal in a ceremony in Washington D.C. The Congressional Gold Medal is the highest honor Congress can bestow on behalf of the American people.

Following the death of fighter ace Henry Buttelmann in September 2019, Cleveland became the last living American jet ace of the Korean War.

Cleveland died on May 22, 2021, at the age of 93. He was buried at Arlington National Cemetery on September 10, 2021.

== Awards and decorations ==
His awards include:

== See also ==
- List of Korean War flying aces
