= University of Bridgeport =

Private university in Bridgeport, Connecticut, US

- Former name: Junior College of Connecticut (1927–1947)
- Type: Private university
- Established: 1927; 99 years ago
- Parent institution: Goodwin University
- Accreditation: NECHE
- Academic affiliations: Space-grant; NEASC; CIC
- Endowment: $34.133 million
- President: Danielle Wilken
- Faculty: 147 full-time
- Undergraduates: 3,152
- Postgraduates: 2,282
- Location: Bridgeport, Connecticut, U.S. 41.1648°N 73.1907°W
- Campus: Midsize city, 86 acres (350,000 m^{2})
- Colors: Purple & white
- Nickname: Purple Knights
- Sporting affiliations: NCAA Division II CACC
- Mascot: Purple Knight
- Website: bridgeport.edu
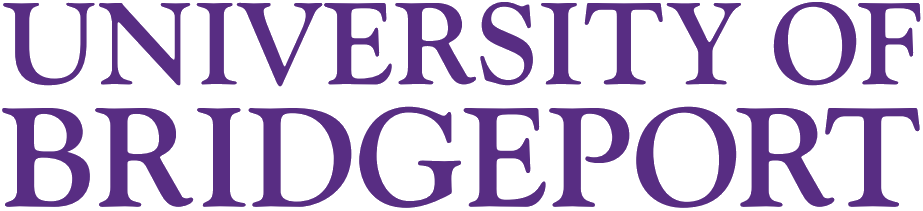

The University of Bridgeport (UB or UBPT) is a private university in Bridgeport, Connecticut, United States. The university is accredited by the New England Commission of Higher Education. In 2021, the university was purchased by Goodwin University; it retained its own name, brand, and board of trustees.

Founded originally as the Junior College of Connecticut, it is the only university in Bridgeport. The university offers more than 60 degree programs to over 5,000 students at the bachelor's, master's, and doctoral levels. This includes the only Chinese medicine program in Connecticut and one of the few chiropractic schools on the East Coast. The university hosted a program in naturopathic medicine until it was discontinued in 2019.

E. Everett Cortright, Alfred Fones, and former Raybestos President Sumner Simpson opened the Junior College of Connecticut, the first of its kind in the Northeastern United States. The school purchased the former P. T. Barnum estate and neighboring property adjacent to Seaside Park and became a four-year institution in 1947, when it was renamed the University of Bridgeport.

== History ==
=== Origins ===
The university began in 1927 as the first junior college in Connecticut. Founders E. Everett Cortright, Alfred Fones, and Sumner Simpson saw a need in Bridgeport, then one of only six American cities of more than 100,000 residents lacking a college or university. The school expanded significantly, adding dormitories and a school of business. The school purchased the former P. T. Barnum estate and neighboring property adjacent to Seaside Park and became a four-year institution in 1947, when it was renamed the University of Bridgeport.

=== Naming and development ===
Founder and first President Everett Cortright and Alfred Civillion Fones chartered the Junior College of Connecticut in November 1927 to expand the academic opportunities for local Connecticut youth. It was the first junior college chartered in the Northeastern United States. Cortright, the former superintendent of schools in Bridgeport and a professor of education at Columbia University, knew there was a great desire for higher education, given there were no colleges easily accessible to people in the region.

On the twentieth anniversary of the Junior College of Connecticut in 1947, the governor of Connecticut chartered the institution as a four-year university with authority to grant the baccalaureate degree. By that time, the P.T. Barnum estate at Seaside Park had been purchased. The Junior College of Connecticut was retained and the College of Arts and Sciences and the Colleges of Business Administration were established at once. These were followed soon after by the Colleges of Nursing, Education and Engineering. The legislature of Connecticut acknowledged the school's growth by renaming the institution "University of Bridgeport" in 1947.

The university's merger with the Weylister Secretarial Junior College of Milford, Connecticut, afforded additional expansion. The school became a division of the Junior College of Connecticut, as did the Fones School of Dental Hygiene which, at its inception in 1949, was the only such school in Connecticut and the second in New England.

The school began awarding master's degrees in 1951. Under President James Halsey, the university was among the first American universities to enroll a significant number of international students. In 1953, Arnold College merged with and was incorporated into the College of Education. Founded in 1886, Arnold was the oldest co-educational school of physical education in the United States. It was directed for many years by E. Herman Arnold, an eminent and pioneering educator.

The university had moved all of its operations from its Fairfield Avenue location to the campus at Seaside Park by 1950. There it occupied 22 acres of land that now has grown to 52 acres. An enrollment of almost 3,500 students included the first influx of international students. The university awarded its first master's degree in 1951 and its first doctoral program in Educational Leadership in 1979, and added a Ph.D. degree program in Computer Science and Engineering in 2006. Two terminal, professional, alternative medicine programs in Chiropractic and Naturopathic Medicine were established in 1991 and 1996 respectively. The naturopathic medicine program was discontinued in 2019.

=== Affiliation with the Unification Church (1992–2002) ===
In 1990, after severe endowment losses, discussion began about affiliating or possibly merging the university with either the University of New Haven or Sacred Heart University. The university was approached by the Professors World Peace Academy (PWPA), an affiliate of the Unification Church, but its offer to bail out the university was spurned by the trustees who said the school was "not going to have anything to do with the offer" and were concerned that such an affiliation would damage the university's reputation.

Problems continued to plague the university; enrollment fell to 1,300 in 1991. Debt rose to over $22 million in 1991–92. Serious plans to merge the university with Sacred Heart fell through in 1992; the law school instead wanted to associate with Quinnipiac University, but Sacred Heart maintained that any takeover would have to include the Law School. There were other universities willing to take over the school, but were unwilling to take on its debt. The university's charter required the trustees to enter into "serious negotiations", and they accepted the offer, giving the PWPA sixteen spots as trustees, constituting a majority. The PWPA invested $50.5 million in the university on May 30, 1992, enabling the university to keep its accreditation.

A two-year faculty strike, started in the midst of the university's financial troubles, intensified when the trustees gave control to the PWPA. Eventually, sixty-six professors and librarians agreed to a "divorce" with the university in return for compensation of up to a year's salary. In a similar move, the Law School decided to cut ties with the university, separating from it. In order for the law school to remain open it had to merge with a financially sound university. The law school faculty and students voted to merge with Quinnipiac University and the name was officially changed to the Quinnipiac University School of Law.

Once PWPA-appointed trustees constituted a majority on the board of trustees, the trustees retained the president at the time, Edwin G. Eigel Jr. (1932–2008). Eigel served as president until 1995. He was succeeded by distinguished Holocaust scholar, professor emeritus at Florida State, and former PWPA president Richard L. Rubenstein, who served from 1995 to 1999. Neil Albert Salonen, a member of the Unification Church, was the chairman of the university's board of trustees when he was chosen to serve as ninth University president in 1999. He had earlier managed several Unification Church related organizations, and had served as president of the Unification Church of the United States from 1973 to 1980, and as chairman of the International Cultural Foundation, prior to becoming the chief executive of the university. Salonen retired in 2018.

Since 2003 the university has been financially independent from PWPA after having received funding from the PWPA from 1992 until 2002. It has remained non-sectarian throughout. Turnover on the board of trustees had led, over time, to a very different composition, when compared to the 1991 board. As he retired, Salonen stated that "2 or 3" members of the board of trustees were church members. Under his successor, Laura Skandera Trombley, the board of trustees was enlarged to 36 members. She announced, in an email to faculty, staff, and students on May 24, 2019, that "During the May 17 meeting of the UB Board of Trustees, the body unanimously voted to amend the university's bylaws to remove any references to and governance rights of the Professors World Peace Academy, an affiliate of the Unification Church...This amendment finalizes a termination process, which was long under way. The board expressed its gratitude for previous support."

=== Present day ===
Enrollment grew from 1,383 total students in 1992 to 5,323 students in fall 2008, a trend which continued throughout the decade, with 5,434 students enrolled in fall 2018. In 1991, the school added a chiropractic program, the first university-affiliated program of its kind in the U.S. Additional doctoral programs in naturopathic medicine and computer science and engineering were added in 1996 and 2006. The Physician Assistant Institute matriculated its first class at the university in January 2011. In 2014, the school partnered with the Peace Corps to offer New England's first Peace Corps Preparatory Program. In 2014, the School of Nursing at Bridgeport Hospital began a merger with the university which was completed over the next few years.

As of 2014, the university consisted of thirteen schools, institutes and colleges:

- School of Arts and Sciences
- Ernest C. Trefz School of Business
- College of Public and International Affairs (CPIA)
- School of Engineering
- Shintaro Akatsu School of Design (SASD)
- Fones School of Dental Hygiene
- School of Continuing and Professional Studies
- College of Chiropractic
- School of Education
- College of Naturopathic Medicine
- Acupuncture Institute (UBAI)
- Nutrition Institute
- Physician Assistant Institute (PAI)
- School of Nursing (In April 2014 the University of Bridgeport and Bridgeport Hospital announced an agreement to absorb the Bridgeport Hospital School of Nursing into the university, forming the University of Bridgeport School of Nursing.)

In 2018, the university reorganized these colleges and schools into three colleges (with constituent programs and schools), in order to encourage interdisciplinary collaboration, streamline administrative channels, and create clarity and identity for current and potential students:

- The College of Arts & Sciences
- The College of Business, Education, & Engineering
- The College of Health Sciences

In 2019, the university announced that the College of Naturopathic Medicine would be discontinued.

On July 25, 2019, the University of Bridgeport and Marlboro College announced plans to enter into a merger that would create an expanded university with deeper connections between professional programs and the liberal arts. It was announced in September 2019 that the merger was no longer in the works. On April 2, 2020, Laura Skandera Trombley resigned as president to assume the presidency of Southwestern University in Texas. Provost Stephen Healey was appointed interim president, and Tarek Sobh, vice president for research & economic development and dean of the College of Business, Education, and Engineering, was appointed interim provost.

In January 2021, it was announced that the non-profit Goodwin University would be taking over the University of Bridgeport, and operating it as a subsidiary, although UB would retain its own name and brand. Goodwin University's provost and dean of faculty, Danielle Wilken, was named as UB’s 12th president.

Two months later, Paier College (formerly Paier College of Art) announced plans to move its campus to Bridgeport, into facilities formerly used by the University of Bridgeport, before the start of the fall 2021 session.

== Region and campus ==
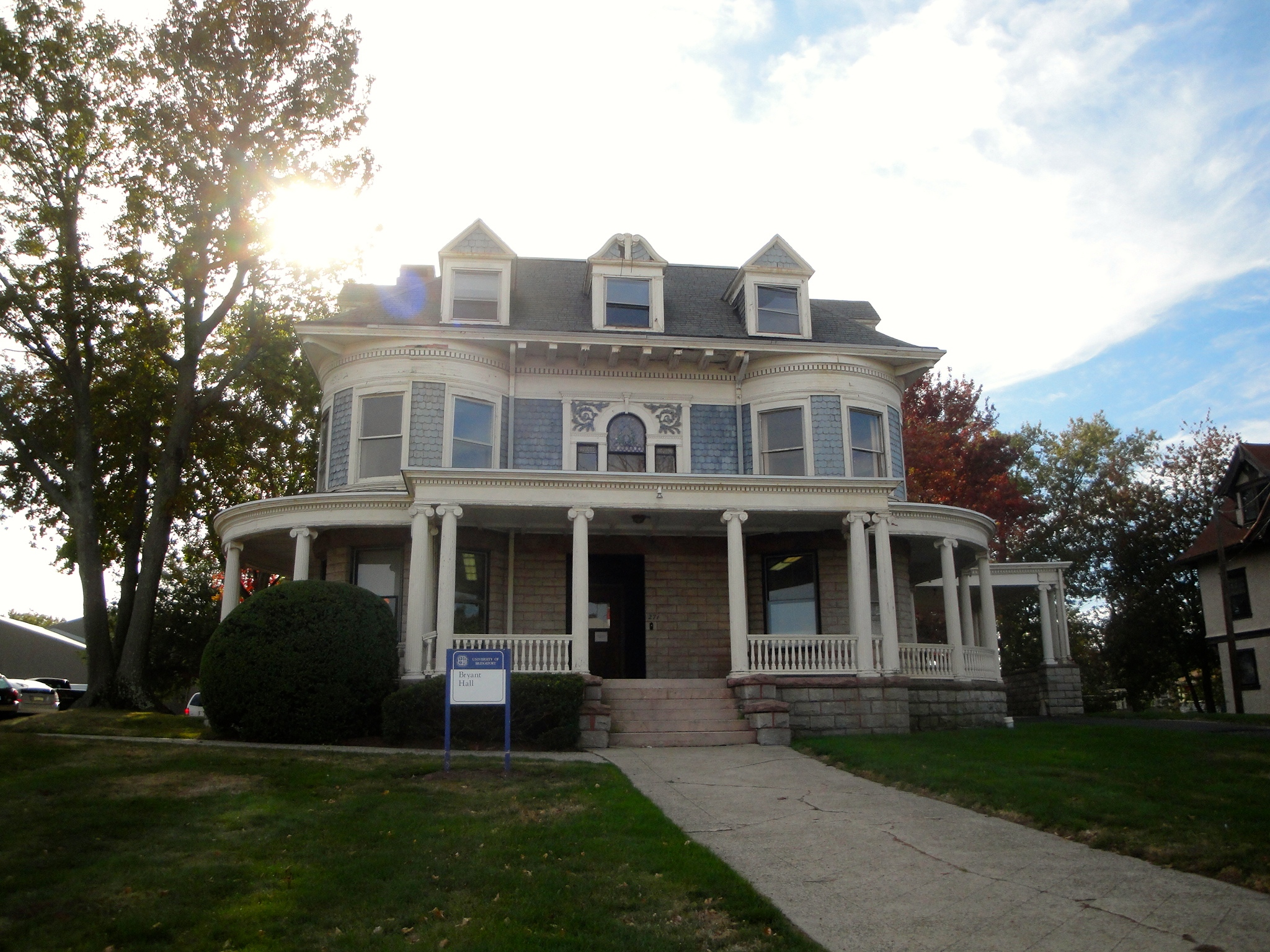
University of Bridgeport Bryant Hall.

University of Bridgeport Cortright Hall.

The stately old Victorian homes on campus date from the late 1800s to the early 1900s, some owned by leading area industrialists and some by family and friends of showman P. T. Barnum. The university has restored two of the homes, and done substantial work on a third. These homes, as well as a newer 1937 home in International style, form the Marina Park Historic District, which is on the National Register of Historic Places.

== Academics ==
Academic rankings

National
- U.S. News & World Report: 389
- Washington Monthly: 378
- WSJ/College Pulse: 600

The University of Bridgeport is accredited by the New England Association of Schools and Colleges. The university is also accredited by the board of governors of the Connecticut Department of Higher Education.

Academic programs range from associate degrees in areas such as Business Administration and Dental Hygiene, to Bachelor of Arts, Bachelor of Fine Arts, Bachelor of Music, and Bachelor of Science degrees in areas such as Accounting, Psychology, Graphic Design, Computer Science, Mathematics, Biology, Music, Computer Engineering, and International Business. The school also offers master's and doctoral programs in areas such as business, counseling, engineering, and education. UB also has adult and continuing education/distance learning programs on their main campus, as well as their Waterbury branch campus, with a total of 125 different programs of study.

For undergraduates, as of 2004, the school started an honors program that allows for the awarding of an honors degree upon graduation, if certain honors course requirements and academic standards (such as a cumulative grade point average of at least 3.0) have been maintained. The program also offers additional course options to students enrolled in the honors program.

In its 2013 rankings, the online graduate computer information technology program was ranked #4 by U.S. News & World Report and it was ranked # 1 in its 2012 rankings while the online bachelor's degree program at UB was ranked #12. The online master's degree in engineering was also ranked #16 in 2013.

In 2021, the University of Bridgeport was ranked #298–#389 in National Universities by U.S. News & World Report.

== Athletics ==
The University of Bridgeport competes in NCAA Division II athletics and has eight women's sports, and five men's sports. The Women's Soccer Team were the 2018 National NCAA Division II Champions.

== Student life ==
Student body composition as of May 2, 2022
Race and ethnicity	Total
Black	34%
Hispanic	30%
White	23%
Foreign national	4%
Asian	4%
Other (Note: Other consists of Multiracial Americans & those who prefer to not say.)	1%
Economic diversity
Low-income (Note: The percentage of students who received an income-based federal Pell grant intended for low-income students.)	56%
Affluent (Note: The percentage of students who are a part of the American middle class at the bare minimum.)	44%

=== Greek life ===
Recognized fraternities and sororities at the university include:

Sororities	Fraternities
Alpha Kappa Alpha	Alpha Phi Alpha
Chi Upsilon Sigma	
Delta Sigma Theta	
Lambda Pi Upsilon	
Sigma Gamma Rho	
Zeta Phi Beta	

=== Campus safety ===
Around 2000, to address safety concerns both on and off-campus, the university instituted a program where students are issued a portable alarm unit (PAL) that pinpoints their position and enables campus security to get to them in under two minutes. This system works immediately on the university campus, and in the neighborhood surrounding campus. Further, the Campus Security Department has 40 unarmed personnel that provide security services 24 hours a day, with both on-foot and on-bicycle patrols. In 2018, in the midst of a rapid gentrification in the neighborhood surrounding the campus, the global security firm ADT ranked UB as the safest campus in Connecticut. In 2019, the university discontinued the use of PALs in favor of the LiveSafe app for mobile devices.

=== Palmetto ===
In front of the Eleanor N. Dana Hall at the College of Naturopathic Medicine, there is a Sabal Palmetto, a small palm about six feet in height with a spread of five feet. This tree is notable for growing so far north from it common cultivation range., which ends at about Virginias eastern shore. What is also notable is it is growing in USDA zone 7a-7b, while palmettos usually grow in 8a and higher. This tree suffered die-back over the harsh 2017–2018 winter and its height was reduced from about 8 feet using the tip of the tallest frond. This Sabal Palmetto was grown from seed from collected in Sun City Center, FL, in 2005. It was planted outside in its current location in 2009 by Eugene Zampieron. It is in a favorable microclimate, very close to a south-facing masonry wall, and is about 500 ft from Long Island Sound with it getting protection each winter. It is listed by Connecticut's Notable Trees website as the first plant of its species and the first palm tree on the database. It is also a Connecticut champion tree.

== Traditions ==
=== University seal ===
Bridgeport's seal combines four core elements of its traditions and distinct character. In the upper left quadrant, the lamp of learning, which has been an element of the official Bridgeport's seal since 1931, is shown. In the upper right quadrant of the seal, the tree of life is shown, symbolizing personal and institutional growth. The lower left shows Bridgeport's seascape, illustrating the university's campus on Long Island Sound. The lower right quadrant shows the Perry Arch, representing tradition, solid foundations, and performance.

== Notable people ==
=== Alumni ===
- Manute Bol, former professional basketball player
- George Dixon, former professional football player, collegiate football coach, and Canadian Football Hall of Fame member
- Kenichi Ebina, winner of America's Got Talent (season 8)
- Tommy Edison, YouTuber and radio presenter known for his blindness and internet presence
- Lee Harry, director
- Henry Buttelmann, flying ace during the Korean and Vietnam War
- Michael J. Jarjura, mayor of Waterbury, Connecticut
- Lamont Jones (born 1972), basketball player
- David Mosser, biologist
- George Logan, member of the Connecticut Senate from the 17th district
- Norman Taylor, basketball player
- Bill Smitrovich, actor
- Dave Weckl, jazz drummer
- Tom Shopay, left-handed hitter who played outfield for the New York Yankees
- Lili Qiu, computer scientist known for her research on wireless networks
- Irwin Chusid, journalist, music historian, radio personality, and record producer
- Ernesto Pernia, former Director-General of the National Economic and Development Authority
- Mark Lasky, cartoonist known for having succeeded Ernie Bushmiller on Nancy
- Jerry Penacoli, host with the US syndicated magazine show Extra
- Joe Tacopina, attorney
- Faisal Shahzad, terrorist
- Kenneth P. Weiss, Entrepreneur
- Shishir Khanal, Minister of Foreign Affairs (Nepal)

=== Gallery ===
Notable Bridgeport alumni include:

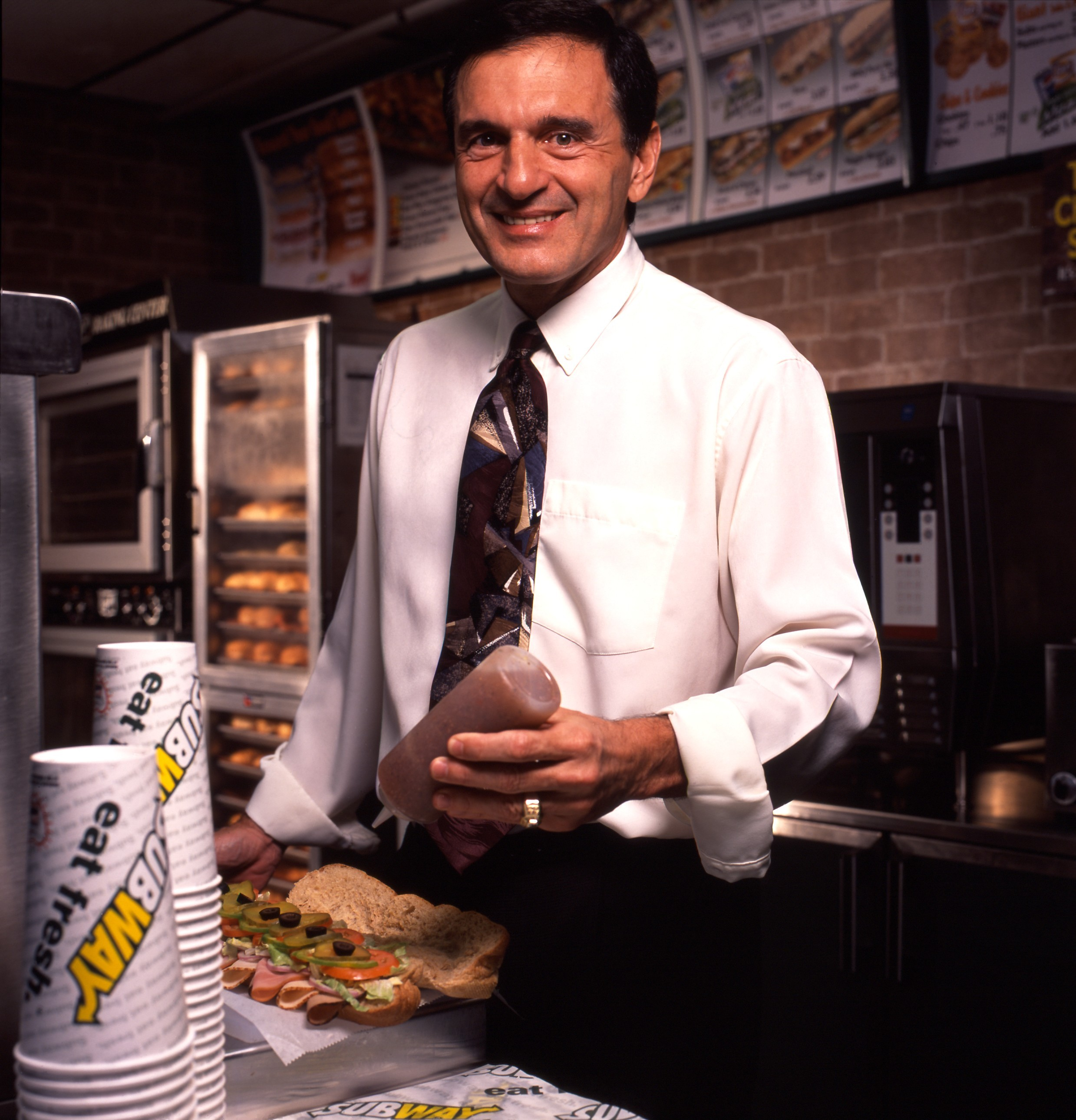
Fred DeLuca (Note: co-founder of the Subway franchise of sandwich restaurants)

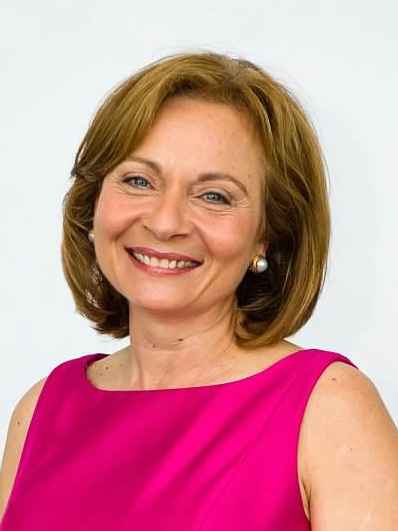
Ellen Alemany (Note: CEO, former chairman and CFO of Citizens Financial Group)

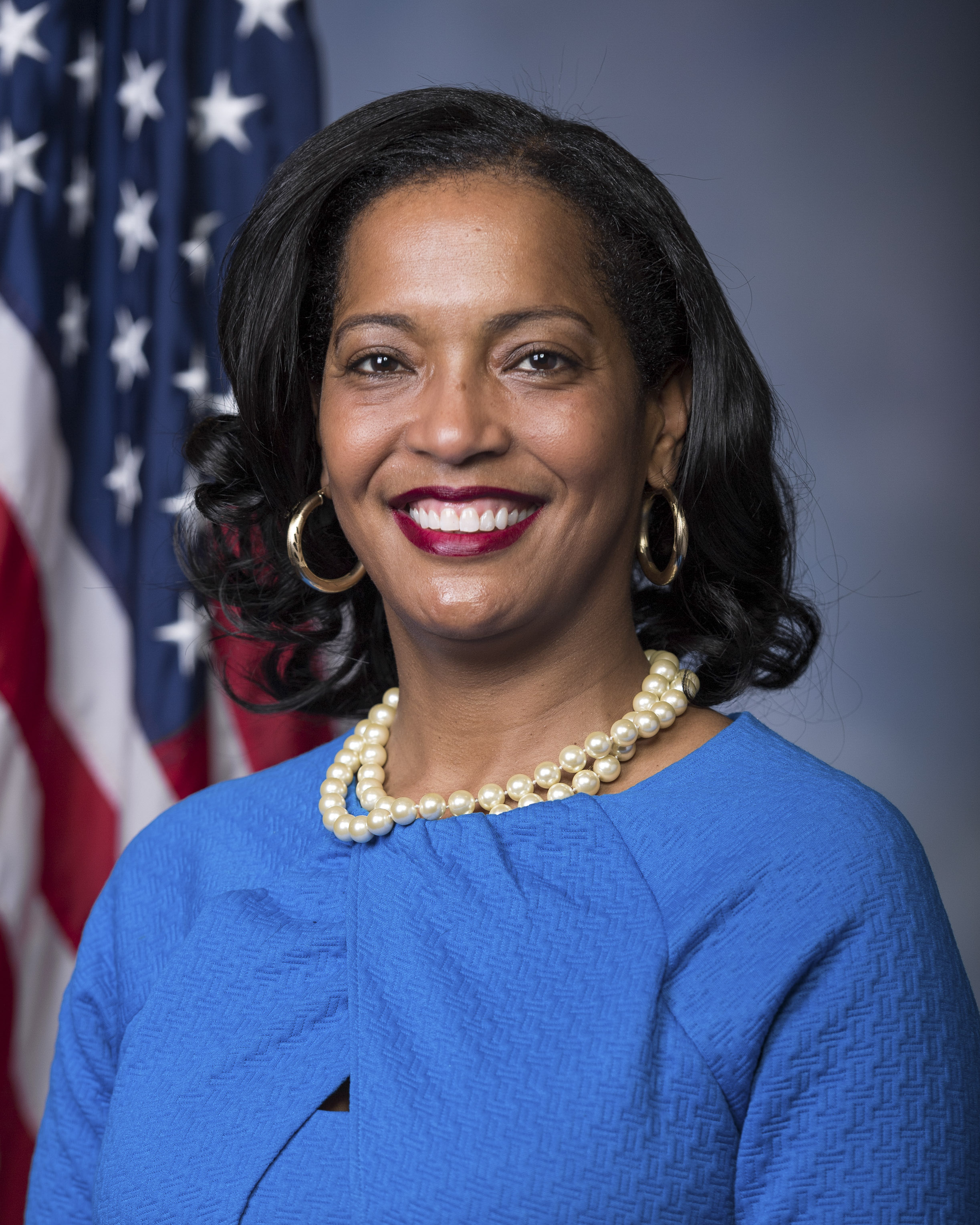
Jahana Hayes (Note: member of the U.S. House of Representatives from Connecticut's 5th district, first African-American woman and African-American Democrat to represent Connecticut in Congress, and National Teacher of the Year in 2016.)

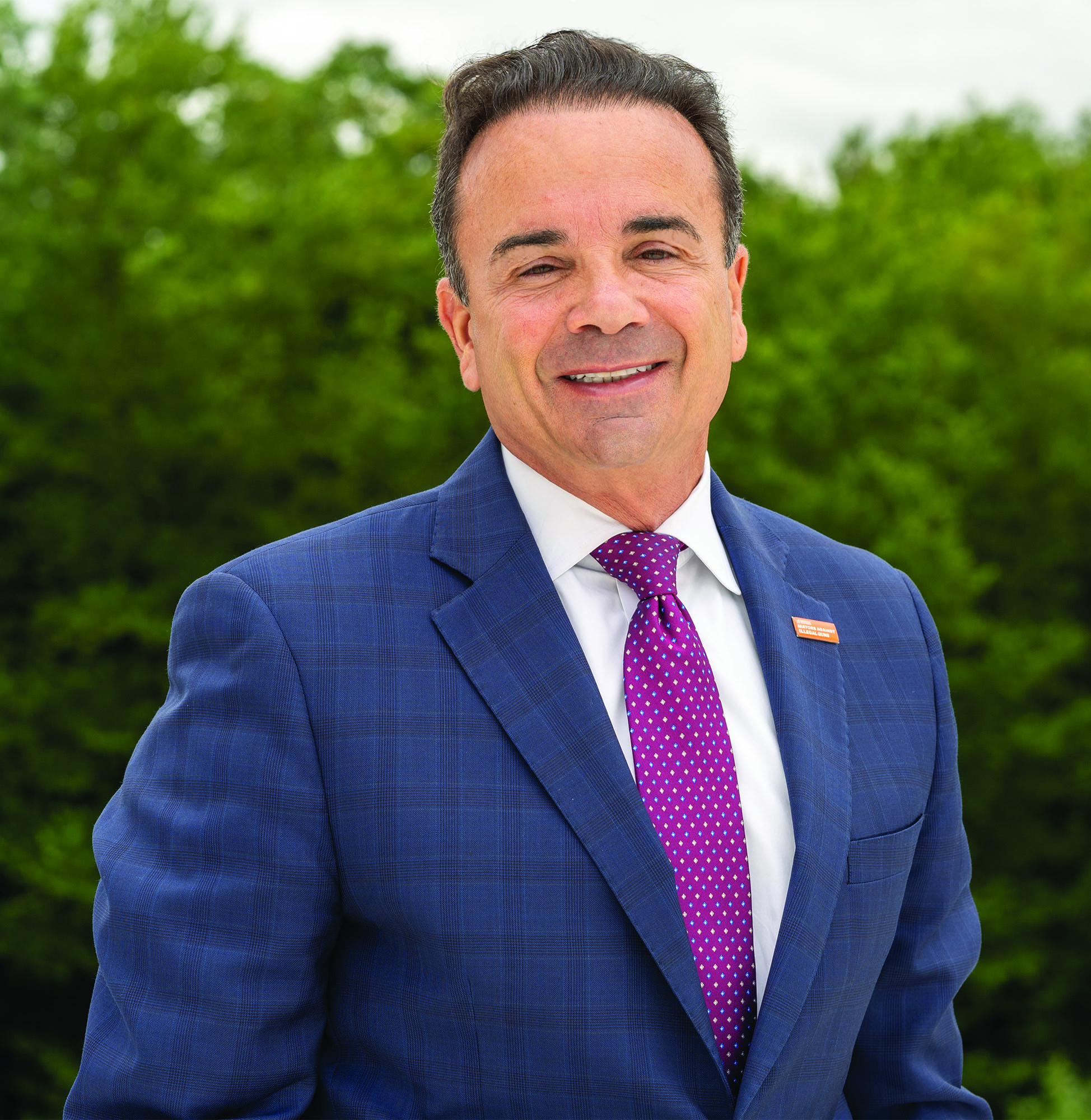
Joe Ganim (Note: 51st, 54th, and current mayor of Bridgeport)

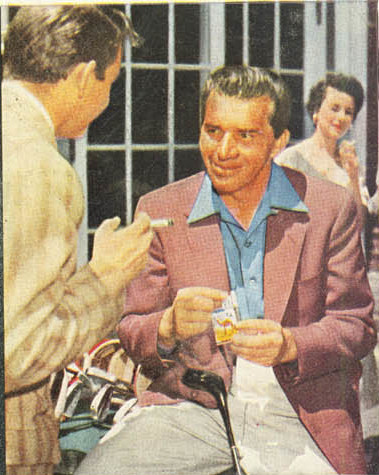
Julius Boros (Note: former professional golfer, winner of 18 PGA Tour events)

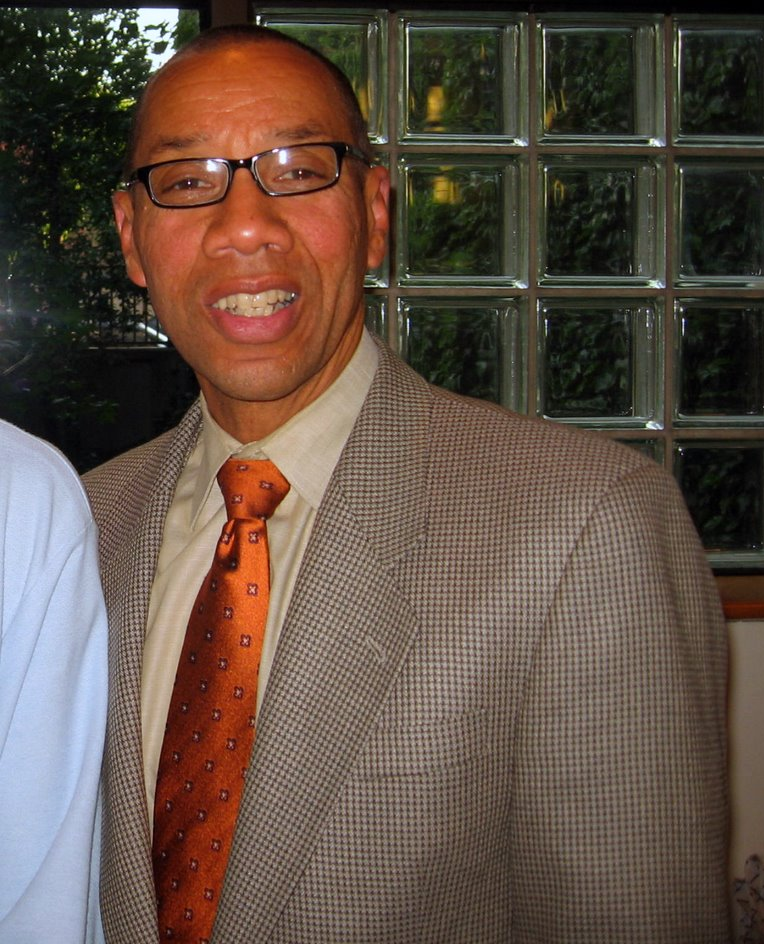
Dennis Walcott (Note: past chancellor of the New York City Department of Education)

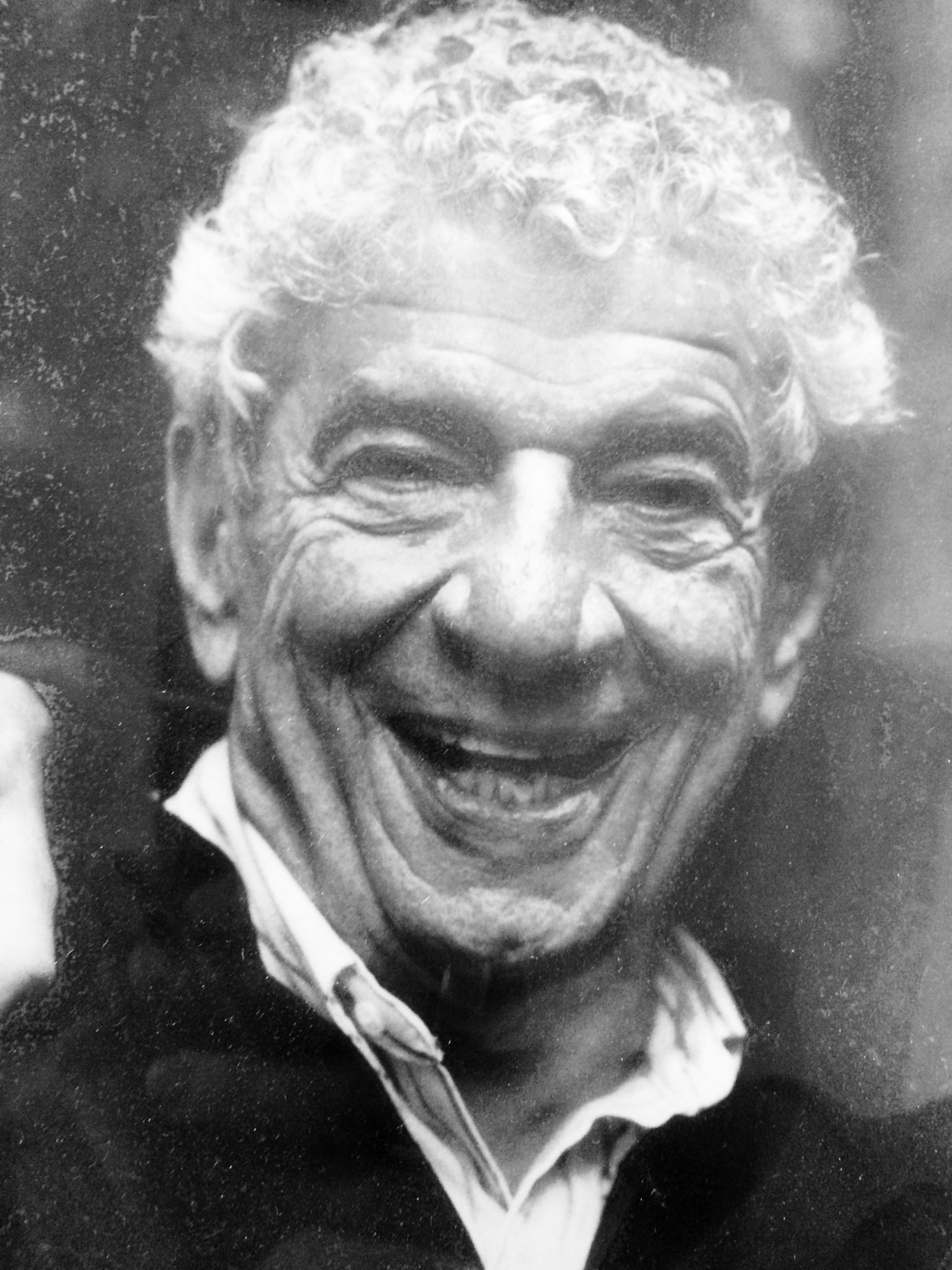
John Rassias (Note: linguist and Dartmouth faculty member)

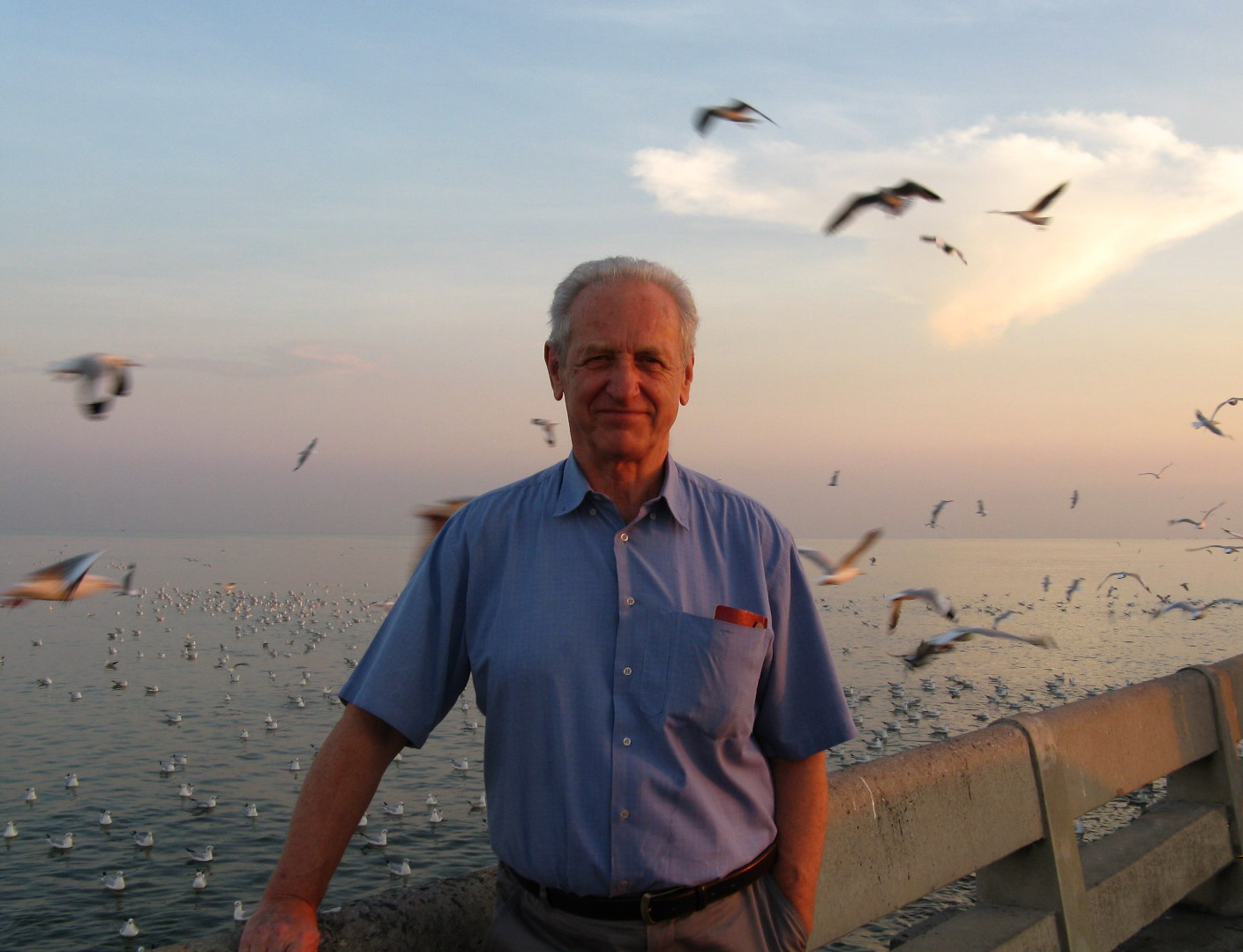
logician Robert Kowalski

=== Faculty ===
- Dick Allen (poet), poet and literary critic
- Robert V. Bruce, 1988 winner of the Pulitzer Prize for History
- Bill Finegan, jazz bandleader, pianist, arranger, and composer.
- Seth Roland (born 1957), soccer player and coach
- Sal Salvador, bebop jazz guitarist and music educator.
- James Shomate, pianist
- Igor Sikorsky, aviation pioneer
- Clark L. Wilson, psychologist
- John Worley, saxophonist
- Denis Collins, business ethicist
- Douglas Townsend, composer and musicologist
- Tarek Sobh, former Dean of the College of Engineering, Business, and Education of the University of Bridgeport, current president of Lawrence Technological University
