= Lewis Veraldi =

Automotive engineer (1930–1990)

- Born: Lewis C. Veraldi; July 16, 1930
- Died: October 13, 1990 (aged 60)
- Education: Lawrence Technological University
- Occupations: Automobile engineer and executive
- Known for: Leadership in the creation of the Ford Taurus

Lewis C. Veraldi (July 16, 1930 – October 13, 1990) was a Ford Motor Company automotive engineer who was a key leader behind the creation of the Ford Taurus.

Veraldi was the son of working-class Italian immigrants who managed to get Lewis and his brother Frank into the Henry Ford Trade School with both working at Ford afterwards. Lewis would attend Lawrence Technological University while working at Ford. Earlier in his career, Veraldi designed a more efficient steering linkage and led the platform team for the Ford Fiesta MKI.

In 1979, Ford Motor Company was in danger of going bankrupt thanks to a moribund product line and increased competition from foreign automakers. Philip Caldwell, Ford's CEO at the time, put Veraldi in charge of a new car to turn Ford's fortunes around, aware that the future of the company would be riding on it.

The Taurus would be a sales success, and set the path for a revitalized Ford Motor Company going into the 1980s and the 1990s.

Often called the "father of the Taurus," Veraldi ended his career as Ford Motor Company vice president in charge of car development, and retired in 1989. He would die from a heart attack one year later in 1990.

== Honors ==
- Automotive Executive of the Year 1987
- Man of the Year 1987 - Automotive Industries magazine
- Eli Whitney Productivity Award 1987 - Society of Manufacturing Engineers
- Lawrence Technological University - Veraldi Instructional Technology Resource Center (VITRC)

== See also ==
- Ford Taurus
