= Michigan Collegiate Hockey Conference =

- Conference: ACHA
- Founded: 1991
- Commissioner: Chris Van Timmeren
- Division: Division 3
- No. of teams: 14
- Headquarters: Holland, Michigan
- Region: North
- Most recent champions: Hope Flying Dutchman (6th title)
- Most titles: Hope Flying Dutchman (6 titles)
- Website: Official Site

The Michigan Collegiate Hockey Conference (MCHC) is a Men's ACHA Division 3 conference made up of smaller colleges and universities in the state of Michigan.

== Championship history ==
=== ACHA National Champions ===
The MCHC has produced fifteen National Championship teams, the most of any Division 3 conference, including Ferris State (1994), Muskegon Community College (2003), Calvin College (2004), Saginaw Valley State (2009, 2010), Adrian College-Gold (2012, 2013, 2014), Michigan State (2015), Oakland (2016), Hope College (2018, 2021, 2022), Michigan (2023) and Lawrence Tech (2024). SVSU became the first school in Division 3 history to not only win two National Championships, but to do it in back-to-back years. Adrian College-Gold later became the first school in Division 3 history to not only make three straight National Championship Games, but to win all three.

=== ACHA National Runners-up ===
The MCHC has produced fourteen National Runners-up including Hope College (2003, 2010, 2011, 2014, 2023), Northwood (2006), Davenport (2012), Michigan-Flint (2013), Aquinas College (2016), Calvin (2017), Oakland (2018), Grand Valley State (2019, 2024) and Michigan (2022). Hope College is the first school in Division 3 to make it to four National Championship games.

=== ACHA National Championship Game ===
The ACHA Division 3 National Championship game has featured two MCHC teams (*) eleven times since 2003. However, a MCHC team has been in the Nation Championship every year since 2009. Lawrence Tech is currently defending champions.

- 2003: Muskegon Community College (1) defeated Hope College.*
- 2009:Saginaw Valley State (1) defeated Florida Gulf Coast.
- 2010: Saginaw Valley State (2) defeated Hope College.*
- 2012: Adrian College-Gold (1) defeated Davenport.*
- 2013: Adrian College-Gold (2) defeated Michigan-Flint.*
- 2014: Adrian College-Gold (3) defeated Hope College.*
- 2015: Michigan State (1) defeated Florida Gulf Coast.
- 2016: Oakland (1) defeated Aquinas College.*
- 2017: Aquinas College (1) defeated Calvin.*
- 2018: Hope College (1) defeated Oakland.*
- 2021: Hope College (2) defeated Arkansas.
- 2022: Hope College (3) defeated Michigan.*
- 2023: Michigan (1) defeated Hope College.*
- 2024: Lawrence Tech (1) defeated Grand Valley State.*

=== Vezina Cup Champions ===
Year	Champion	Runner-up
2024	Hope College	Lawrence Tech
2023	Hope College	Michigan
2022	Grand Valley State	Hope College
2021	N/A	(COVID)
2020	Central Michigan	Michigan
2019	Hope College	Michigan
2018	Central Michigan	Michigan State
2017	Aquinas College	Adrian College-Gold
2016	Oakland	Aquinas College
2015	Hope College	Oakland
2014	Davenport	Oakland
2013	Adrian College-Gold	Davenport
2012	Saginaw Valley State	Hope College
2011	Davenport	N/A
2010	Saginaw Valley State	N/A
2009	N/A	N/A
2008	Hope College	N/A
2007	Hope College	N/A
2006	Calvin	Hope College
2005	Lansing Community College	N/A
2004	Hope College	N/A
2003	Hope College	N/A

Totals

Team	Titles
Hope College	6
Central Michigan	2
Davenport	2
Saginaw Valley State	2
Aquinas College	1
Grand Valley State	1
Oakland	1
Adrian College-Gold	1
Calvin	1

== Current teams ==
East Division

Institution	Location	Founded	Affiliation	Enrollment	Nickname	Colors
Adrian College	Adrian, MI	1859	Private/Methodist	1,700	Bulldogs	
Central Michigan University	Mount Pleasant, MI	1892	Public	27,069	Chippewas	
Lawrence Tech University	Southfield, MI	1932	Private/Non-sectarian	4,000	Blue Devils	
University of Michigan	Ann Arbor, MI	1817	Public	43,651	Wolverines	
University of Michigan-Flint	Flint, MI	1956	Public	8,000	Victors	
Oakland University	Rochester Hills, MI	1957	Public	17,737	Golden Grizzlies	
Saginaw Valley State University	Kochville Township, MI	1963	Public	10,498	Cardinals	

West Division

Institution	Location	Founded	Affiliation	Enrollment	Nickname	Colors
Calvin University	Grand Rapids, MI	1876	CRC	4,075	Knights	
Davenport University	Grand Rapids, MI	1866	Private/Non-profit	12,471	Panthers	
Ferris State University	Big Rapids, MI	1884	Public	10,361	Bulldogs	
Grand Valley State University	Allendale, MI	1960	Public	24,408	Lakers	
Hope College	Holland, MI	1960	RCA	3,200	Flying Dutchmen	
Michigan State University	East Lansing, MI	1855	Public	48,000	Spartans	
Western Michigan University	Kalamazoo, MI	1903	Public	16,643	Stallions	

== Former members ==
- Indiana Institute of Technology
- Northwood University
