= Tarek Sobh =

Egyptian American professor

Tarek M. Sobh
- طارق صبح

8th President of Lawrence Technological University
- Incumbent
- Assumed office January 1, 2022
- Preceded by: Virinder K. Moudgil

Personal details
- Occupation: Academician; Scientists; Engineer
- Scientific career
- Education: Alexandria University, University of Pennsylvania
- Alma mater: Alexandria University
- Fields: computer science
- Workplaces: University of Bridgeport; Lawrence Technological University; University of Utah
- Thesis: Active observer: A discrete event dynamic system model for controlling an observer under uncertainty (1991)
- Doctoral advisor: Ruzena Bajcsy

Tarek M. Sobh (Arabic: طارق صبح) is an Egyptian-American professor of Electrical Engineering and Computer Science. He was the former Dean of the College of Engineering, Business, and Education of the University of Bridgeport and he is the current president of Lawrence Technological University.

== Education ==
He obtained his first degree, B.Sc. in Engineering in Computer Science and Automatic Control from the Alexandria University, Egypt in 1988. He obtained his M.Sc and Ph.D. in Computer and Information Science from University of Pennsylvania in 1989 and 1991.

== Career ==
He is currently the President and Professor of Electrical and Computer Engineering at Lawrence Technological University (LTU) in Southfield, MI. He is Distinguished Professor and Dean of Engineering Emeritus at the University of Bridgeport, Connecticut.

He was the Provost at Lawrence Technological University (2020 - 2021) and has served at the University of Bridgeport (UB) Executive Vice President, Research and Economic Development and the Founding Dean of the College of Engineering, Business, and Education (2018 - 2020). He was the Founding Director of the Interdisciplinary Robotics, Intelligent Sensing, and Control (RISC) Laboratory (1995-2020), the Founder of the High-Tech Business Incubator at UB (CTech IncUBator) (2010 - 2011) and the Founding Director of the UB Innovation Center (2019 - 2020). From 1992-1995 he was a research Assistant Professor of Computer at the University of Utah. He was an associate professor at the University of Bridgeport between 1995-1999. In 2000 he became a professor at the same institution.

At Bridgeport University, he was the Senior Vice President for Graduate Studies and Research (2014-2018), Vice President (2008-2014), Vice Provost (2006-2008), Dean of the School of Engineering (1999-2018), Interim Dean of the School of Business, Director of External Engineering Programs, Interim Chair of Computer Science and Computer Engineering, and Chair of the Department of Technology Management. He also served as a Professor of Computer, Electrical and Mechanical Engineering and Computer Science (2000-2010) and an Associate professor of Computer Science and Computer Engineering (1995-1999). At the University of Utah, he was a Research Assistant Professor of Computer Science at the Department of Computer Sciences, College of Engineering (1992-1995) and a Research Fellow at the General Robotics and Active Sensory Perception (GRASP) Laboratory of the University of Pennsylvania (1989-1991).

== Fellowship and membership ==
Sobh is a member of the Association of Egyptian American Scholars, the Society of Manufacturing Engineers (SME), Society for Industrial Computing, International Society for Optical Engineering, Association for Computing Machinery (ACM), the American Society of Quality Control (ASQC), the Society of Manufacturing Engineers (SME), and the Arab Science and Technology Foundation (ASTF).

Sobh is also a member of the Institute of Electrical and Electronics Engineers (IEEE), alongside the following affiliated organizations: IEEE Computer Society, IEEE Control Systems Society (CSS), Computer-Aided Control Systems Technical Committee, and the IEEE Robotics and Automation Society.

== Research Interests ==
Sobh has authored over 380 academic works, including, conference papers, and journal articles. His academic papers have been featured in publications like the Journal of Intelligent & Robotic Systems, Journal of STEM Education, and Springer Science & Business Media.

According to his website, Dr. Sobh’s current research interests include: “reverse engineering and industrial inspection, CAD/CAM and active sensing under uncertainty, robots and electromechanical systems prototyping, sensor-based distributed control schemes, unifying tolerances across sensing, design, and manufacturing, hybrid and discrete event control, modeling, and applications, and autonomous mobile robotic manipulation.”
