= Jeff Duvendeck =

American football coach (born c. 1977)

Current position
- Title: Offensive coordinator
- Team: Carthage
- Conference: CCIW

Biographical details
- Born: c. 1977 (age 48–49); Flushing, Michigan, U.S.
- Education: Central Michigan University (2000); Michigan State University (2016)

Playing career
- 1996–2000: Central Michigan
- Position: Running back

Coaching career (HC unless noted)
- 2001 (spring): Central Michigan (assistant)
- 2001: Tiffin (GA)
- 2002: Grand Valley State (GA)
- 2003–2005: Michigan Tech (OL)
- 2006–2009: Northern Michigan (OC/OL)
- 2010: Michigan State (GA)
- 2011–2016: Culver–Stockton
- 2017–2019: Lawrence Tech
- 2020: Eastern Michigan (OA)
- 2021–2023: St. Thomas (MN) (OL)
- 2024–present: Carthage (OC)

Head coaching record
- Overall: 20–65

Jeffrey Duvendeck (born c. 1977) is an American college football coach. He is the offensive coordinator for Carthage College, a position he has held since 2024. He was the head football coach for Culver–Stockton College from 2011 to 2016 and Lawrence Technological University from 2017 to 2019. He also coached for Central Michigan, Tiffin, Grand Valley State, Michigan Tech, Northern Michigan, Michigan State, Eastern Michigan, and St. Thomas (MN). He played college football for Central Michigan as a running back.

== Head coaching record ==
Year	Team	Overall	Conference	Standing	Bowl/playoffs
Culver–Stockton Wildcats (Heart of America Athletic Conference) (2011–2016)
2011	Culver–Stockton	1–10	1–8	T–9th	
2012	Culver–Stockton	3–8	2–7	8th	
2013	Culver–Stockton	2–9	2–7	T–8th	
2014	Culver–Stockton	6–5	4–5	T–6th	
2015	Culver–Stockton	1–11	0–5	6th (North)	
2016	Culver–Stockton	1–10	0–5	6th (North)	
Culver–Stockton:		14–53	9–37		
Lawrence Tech Blue Devils (NAIA independent) (2018)
2018	Lawrence Tech	5–3			
Lawrence Tech Blue Devils (Mid-States Football Association) (2019)
2019	Lawrence Tech	1–9	0–6	7th (MEL)	
Lawrence Tech:		6–12	0–6		
Total:		20–65			
