= David Mosser =

American cell biologist

David M. Mosser
- Occupations: Researcher, academic and author

Academic background
- Education: B.S., M.S. (1975); Ph.D. (1983)
- Alma mater: University of Bridgeport; North Carolina State University; Harvard Medical School

David M. Mosser is an American researcher, academic and author. He is professor of cell biology and molecular genetics at University of Maryland and the director of Maryland Pathogen Research Institute. Mosser's research is primarily in the field of immunology. He is most known for the discovery and characterization of macrophages with anti-inflammatory and growth-promoting activity, termed regulatory macrophages. He has written over 150 articles in scientific journals that have been cited over 25,000 times.

== Education ==
Growing up in Scotch Plains, New Jersey, Mosser attended Seton Hall Preparatory School in West Orange, New Jersey. Mosser received his B.S. and M.S. from University of Bridgeport in 1975 where he was a scholarship athlete on the football team. He received his Ph.D. in immunology from North Carolina State University in 1982. He completed his postdoctoral training at Harvard Medical School.

== Career ==
In 1985, Mosser joined Cornell University as an assistant professor. He left Cornell University in 1988 and joined Temple University Medical School, where he rose to the rank of full professor in 1999. In 2000, he joined the University of Maryland as professor of cell biology and molecular genetics. In 2005, he was appointed as the director of Maryland Pathogen Research Institute.

In 2003, Mosser served as the president of Society for Leukocyte Biology. He was the chair of Division E (Immunology) of the ASM (2012) and a member of the NIH, NIAID Board of Scientific Councilors (2005-2010). He has been on the editorial boards of the Journal of Biological Chemistry (2007-2012), the Journal of Immunology (2008-2012), Infection and Immunity (2005-2008), and the Journal of Leukocyte Biology (2004-2009). He continues to serve on the editorial boards of mBio (since 2010), Frontiers in Immunology (since 2010), and of Microbiology Spectrum (since 2014). Mosser was appointed as the chair of Maryland Stem Cell Commission in 2017.

=== Research ===
==== Regulatory macrophages ====
Mosser's laboratory has studied the heterogeneity of macrophages, and the roles these cells play in positively or negatively influencing adaptive immune responses. Mosser is generally credited with identifying and characterizing a population of macrophages with anti-inflammatory and immunoregulatory activity, termed Regulatory Macrophages (R-MΦ). They hypothesize that the generation of these cells can be exploited to mitigate autoimmunity. Conversely, the deletion of these cells may potentiate immune responses.

==== Macrophage cytokine production ====
Macrophages are secretory cells, and the cytokines they produce play an important role in modifying innate and adaptive immune responses. Mosser and his colleagues have examined cytokine production by macrophages and have characterized the transcription factors and signaling pathways involved in cytokine production by differentially stimulated macrophages. Their research has shown that NF-kB p50 homodimers are uniquely involved in IL-10 induction in macrophages, that activation of the MAPK p38 is required for IL-12 production in macrophages, and that macrophage secretory products can exert an intrinsic influence on cytokine production.

==== Transcriptomic studies to better understand macrophages ====
Mosser has utilized high throughput RNA sequencing to examine the transcriptomes of the various macrophage subpopulations, and to better understand the dynamics of intracellular infections in macrophages. He provided a simultaneous analysis of macrophages and parasite transcripts over time as L. major established an in vitro infection in human macrophages. Mosser and his lab analyzed L. major gene expression during differentiation. They have profiled host and parasite transcripts in lesions of patients with cutaneous L. braziliensis infections and with diffuse cutaneous infections with L. amazonensis.
