= James Shomate =

James Shomate (November 29, 1914 in Bakersfield, CA – October 13, 2001 in Manhattan) was an American pianist and voice teacher. He was particularly known for his work as an accompanist; notably playing in concerts and recitals for famous singers like Pierre Bernac, Richard Bonelli, Brenda Lewis, Anna Moffo, Lily Pons, Yvonne Printemps, Elisabeth Söderström, Gérard Souzay, Risë Stevens, and Jennie Tourel among others. For many years he served as a member of the voice faculty at the University of Bridgeport.
