= Pavel Gorbunov =

Russian footballer

Personal information
- Full name: Pavel Andreyevich Gorbunov
- Date of birth: 13 May 1998 (age 28)
- Place of birth: Tolyatti, Russia
- Height: 1.82 m (6 ft 0 in)
- Position: Defender

Youth career
- FC Lada-Tolyatti

Senior career*
Years	Team	Apps	(Gls)
2017–2018	FC Lada-Tolyatti	12	(0)
2018	FC Akron Tolyatti (amateur)		
2019–2021	FC Akron Tolyatti	11	(0)
2021	→ FC Lada Dimitrovgrad (loan)	7	(0)
2021	FC Lada-Tolyatti	19	(1)
- * Club domestic league appearances and goals

Pavel Andreyevich Gorbunov (Russian: Павел Андреевич Горбунов; born 13 May 1998) is a Russian former football player.

== Club career ==
He made his debut in the Russian Football National League for FC Akron Tolyatti on 8 August 2020 in a game against FC Shinnik Yaroslavl, he substituted Maksim Yeleyev in the 78th minute.
