= Boris Gorbunov =

Russian farmer and politician

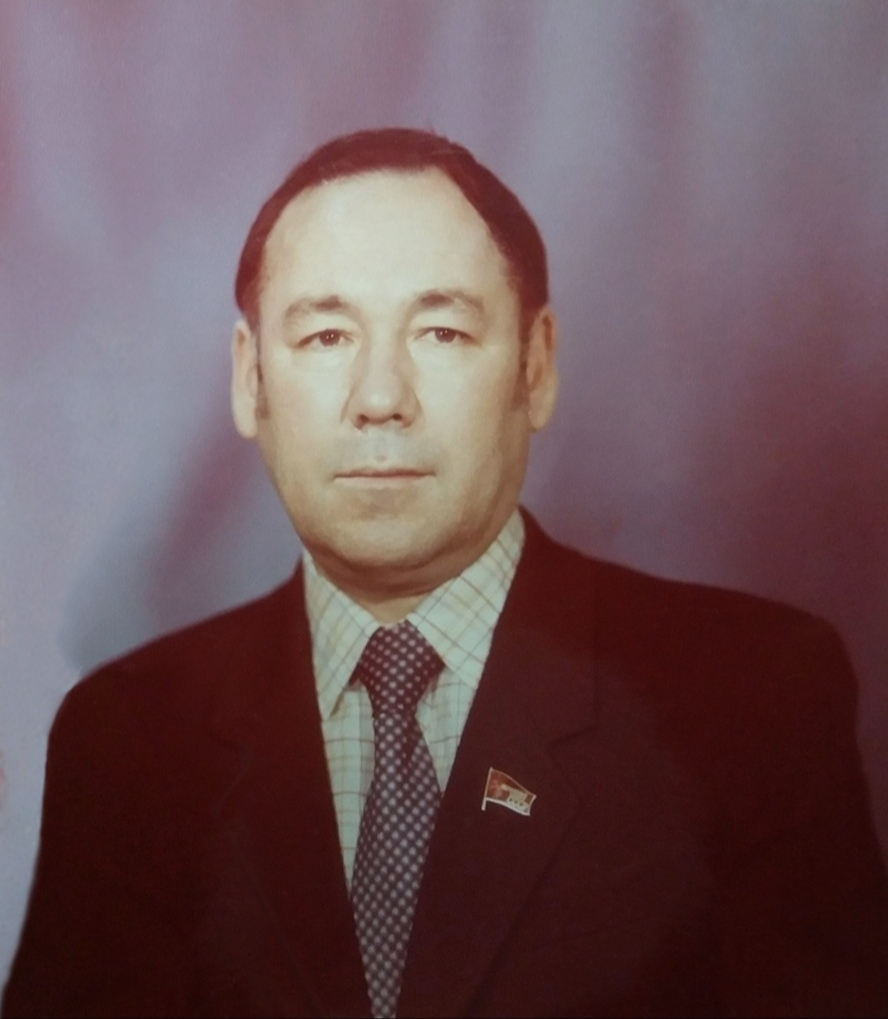

Member of the Supreme Soviet of the Soviet Union
- In office 1979–1989

Personal details
- Born: Boris Dmitrievich Gorbunov; 10 September 1938 Sibatorkino, Gornomariysky District, Mari El, Russian SFSR, Soviet Union
- Died: 15 November 2022 (aged 84)
- Party: CPSU
- Education: Gorky Agricultural Institute
- Occupation: Farmer

Boris Dmitrievich Gorbunov (Russian: Борис Дмитриевич Горбунов; 10 September 1938 – 15 November 2022) was a Soviet-Russian farmer and politician. A member of the Communist Party, he served on the Supreme Soviet of the Soviet Union from 1979 to 1989.

Gorbunov died on 15 November 2022 at the age of 84.
