= Ivan Gorbunov (pilot) =

Soviet World War II flying ace

- Born: 25 May 1915; Stuzhen village, Kursk Governorate, Russian Empire
- Died: 29 June 1953 (aged 38) North Korea
- Allegiance: Soviet Union
- Branch: Soviet Air Force
- Service years: 1935–1953
- Rank: Lieutenant Colonel
- Conflicts: World War II; Korean War †
- Awards: Hero of the Soviet Union

Ivan Mikhailovich Gorbunov (Russian: Иван Михайлович Горбунов; 25 May 1915 – 29 June 1953) was a Soviet flying ace awarded the title Hero of the Soviet Union during World War II. He remained in the military after the war and went on to fly in the Korean War, where he was killed in action on 29 June 1953.

== Early life ==
Gorbunov was born on 25 May 1915 to a Russian peasant family in Stuzhen village. After completing secondary school and veterinary technical school he was drafted into the military. Sent to the Yeisk Naval Aviation School on a Komsomol ticket, he graduated from the institution in 1937, after which he worked at the Konotop Military Aviation School as a flight instructor before being promoted flight commander in a fighter squadron associated with the institution.

== World War II ==
After the German invasion of the Soviet Union, Gorbunov began to participate in sorties as part of his flight school's squadron, but it was not until August 1942 that he was formally deployed to the frontlines as a fighter pilot in the 8th Fighter Aviation Regiment, which was honored with the guards designation and renamed as the 42nd Guards Fighter Aviation Regiment on 8 February 1943. Less than a week before the regiment's official renaming, he gained his first aerial victory - a courier plane over Timashevskaya. The following month during a sortie to attack an enemy airfield, his Yak-1 was hit by enemy anti-aircraft fire, but he managed to cross fly his stricken plane into friendly territory to make an emergency landing and extinguish the fire. Throughout the year he rapidly increased his tally of aerial victories, resulting in him being nominated for the title Hero of the Soviet Union in July 1943. By then, he had reached the rank of senior lieutenant and been promoted to the position of deputy squadron commander. When he was awarded the title Hero of the Soviet Union on 2 September 1943 his tally then stood at 15 solo plus one shared victory, and he continued to accumulate additional shootdowns until 1944, his last aerial victory being a Bf 109 over Zander on 13 April 1944. When the war ended he was a squadron commander with the rank of captain, having gained 24 solo plus one shared aerial victories. While he piloted both the Yak-1 and Yak-9 in the war, all of his shootdowns took place while piloting the Yak-1.

== Korean War ==
After the end of the war, Gorbunov remained in the air force and went on to graduate from the Air Force Academy in 1949. Later he was deployed to the warfront of the Korean War in mid 1952 as deputy commander of flight training in the 676th Fighter Aviation Regiment; there, he conducted sorties on the MiG-15, but gained no aerial victories.

=== Last flight and death ===
On 29 June 1953 Gorbunov, then a lieutenant colonel, participated in a sortie over Korea that resulted in air-to-air combat with American Sabers. While aiding a more inexperienced Russian pilot, he was shot down by an American plane. While he did survive the shootdown by ejecting, he was shot in his parachute, likely by American ace Henry Buttelman; US aircraft gun cameras were designed in such a way that they would only run while the aircraft gun was running, forcing pilots to fire in order to photograph proof of a shootdown. He was buried in the city cemetery of Voroshilov-Ussuriysky.

== Awards ==
- Hero of the Soviet Union (2 September 1943)
- Order of Lenin (2 September 1943)
- Three Order of the Red Banner (9 September 1942, 5 April 1943, 15 April 1944)
- Order of Alexander Nevsky (17 June 1943)
- Order of the Red Star (15 November 1950)
- campaign medals
