= Greek life =

Greek life can refer to:

- Culture of Greece
- College fraternities and sororities
