= Cecil G. Foster =

WWII Ace

- Foster in his personalized F-86 Sabre.
- Born: Cecil Glen Foster; August 30, 1925; Porter Township, Midland County, Michigan
- Died: July 5, 2016 (aged 90); Sparks, Nevada
- Burial place: Arlington National Cemetery
- Relatives: Wife: Ramona
- Military career
- Allegiance: United States
- Branch: Army Air Forces Corps
- Service years: 1943-1975
- Rank: Lieutenant Colonel
- Unit: 16th Fighter-Interceptor Squadron
- Commands: 390th Tactical Fighter Squadron
- Awards: Congressional Gold Medal; 2 Silver Stars; Purple Heart

Cecil Glen Foster (August 30, 1925 – July 5, 2016) was a veteran of the Korean War and the 23rd United States Ace: he shot down 9 Mig-15s. He was a recipient of the American Fighter Aces Congressional Gold Medal, the Distinguished Flying Cross, two Silver Stars and a Purple Heart. During the Korean War Foster flew 200 combat sorties. He was also commanded the 390th Tactical Fighter Squadron during the Vietnam War.

== Education ==
- Midland High School (graduated in 1943)
- Aviation Cadet Training Program (USAAF) (1945)

== Career ==
in 1943 Foster joined the Army Air Force and held the rank of private. He earned his wings in 1948 and resigned his commission in 1950. After two years in civilian life the Korean War began and in 1951 Foster was recalled to active duty.

He saw action in the Korean War where he shot down 9 planes which places him 12th on the list of 38 Korean War aces. During the Korean War he piloted an F-86 Sabre and he flew 200 combat sorties.

During the Vietnam War Foster was the commander of the 390th Tactical Fighter Squadron in DaNang in 1968. He retired in 1975 with the rank of lieutenant colonel.

On May 20, 2015 Foster traveled to Washington D.C. to receive the Congressional Gold Medal. He was one of 36 former combat pilots representing the American Fighter Aces Association.

In 2001 he published his memoirs entitled: MiG Alley to Mu Ghia Pass: Memoirs of a Korean War Ace.

== Awards ==
- Congressional Gold Medal (2015)
- Silver Star (Note: "The President of the United States of America, authorized by Act of Congress July 9, 1918, takes pleasure in presenting the Silver Star to First Lieutenant Cecil Glen Foster (AFSN: AO-2054256), United States Air Force, for gallantry in action against an enemy of the United Nations as a Pilot of an F-86 aircraft, 16th Fighter-Interceptor Squadron, 51st Fighter-Interceptor Wing, Fifth Air Force, on 26 September 1952. On that date, while leading an element of two F-86E type aircraft on a fighter sweep, Lieutenant Foster was attacked by six MIG-15s, and as they passed over, he pursued them. The MiGs then turned and closed on Lieutenant Foster. Although outnumbered and outgunned, he held his course toward the enemy. As they drew together, the MiGs fired across the nose of his aircraft. Lieutenant Foster returned the fire, hitting the enemy flight leader in the tail section, and his wingman in the nose section. Lieutenant Foster's hits on the enemy flight leader caused the MIG to explode. The second MIG began to smoke while the rest of the flight left the area. Lieutenant Foster made another firing pass on the crippled MIG, raking the entire length of the fuselage, and causing the pilot to parachute. As a result of his disregard for personal safety, superior flying skill and marksmanship, Lieutenant Foster was responsible for the destruction of two MIG-15s, and reflected great credit upon himself, the Far East Air Forces, and the United States Air Force.")
- Purple Heart

== Personal ==
Foster was born in Porter Township Michigan. He went to Midland High School and graduated in 1943. His mother died from polio and he moved in with his grandparents and lived on their farm. After high school he joined the Aviation Cadet Training Program (USAAF). On January 13, 1945 he married Margaret Mary Née Frazer: together they had five sons.

== See also ==
- List of Korean War flying aces

== Bibliography ==
- Foster, Cecil G. (2001). MiG Alley to Mu Ghia Pass: Memoirs of a Korean War Ace. Jefferson, North Carolina: McFarland and Company Inc. ISBN 978-0786409952.
