= Kenneth P. Weiss =

American businessman

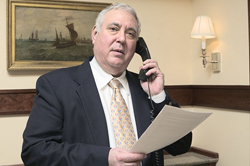
Kenneth P. Weiss

Kenneth P. Weiss was an American entrepreneur, human factors engineer and inventor. He invented the SecurID Card, now a trademark of RSA Security.

== Career ==
Weiss held a bachelor's degree from the University of Bridgeport, continued graduate studies and research at the University of New Hampshire and Temple University, and received a doctorate from the Neotarian Fellowship.

He founded Security Dynamics in 1984, and served as CEO until 1986, and chairman of the board and CTO until 1996. He initiated the purchase in 1993 of RSA Security, then a small encryption company working in internet commerce. In 1994, Security Dynamics went public on the NASDAQ stock exchange. Weiss was the company's largest individual shareholder.. The company developed and sold the SecurID Card and RSA encryption technologies for computer security, electronic commerce and identity authentication. He resigned in 1996 citing policy disagreements with directors and with the company's operations and policies, when the company had achieved a market capitalization of more than $4 billion In 2006 the company was purchased by EMC Corporation.

In 1994 he published an article enumerating what he regarded as seven significant flaws in the Clipper chip initiative. Weiss’ position and the article contributed to the abandonment of the multibillion-dollar U.S. government program, which Weiss asserted would have allowed electronic eavesdropping on any US citizen with a surveillance chip embedded in private electronic communication equipment.

Weiss had taught at Penn State, the University of Bridgeport, Nasson College, and at King's College, where he was chairman of the psychology department for seven years as a professor and textbook author.

He was on the editorial board of the Journal of Information Systems Security, and was chairman of the identification and authentication division of the American Defense Preparedness Association's committee on computer security. He was also a member of the Technology and Ethics Committee of the Information Systems Security Association (ISSA).

Until his death on 8 February 2025, Weiss was the founder and CEO of Universal Secure Registry (USR), a company based in Newton, Massachusetts, that develops technologies for identification, authentication and mobile phone applications.

He held 22 U.S. patents, as well as foreign patents.

== Awards and recognition ==
Weiss was a member of the American Association for the Advancement of Science, and the honor societies Sigma Xi and Psi Chi.

== Philanthropic work ==
Weiss was also involved philanthropic work for the Cape Ann Symphony, Rockport Chamber Music Society, Gloucester Stage Co., the Gloucester Schooner Festival, historical meeting house restoration, the Cape Ann Historical Association, the Perfect Storm Foundation, Addison Gilbert and Beverly Hospitals, the Lahey Clinic, and political action groups.
