= American Fighter Aces Association =

American non-profit

The American Fighter Aces Association logo

American Fighter Aces Association is a 501(c)(3) non-profit organization which recognizes the 1,485 combat American pilots (referred to as Aces) who have had five or more aerial victories in combat.

== History ==
The American Fighter Aces Association was founded in 1960 to honor the 1,450 American "Ace" pilots. On September 23, 1960, The AFAA held its first reunion in San Francisco, Calif. To be a member honored by the association a pilot needs to have shot down at least five enemy aircraft in combat.

Since July 1984, the organization has maintained its status as a 501(c)(3) tax-exempt nonprofit.

~~The association reported for the year 2023 total revenue of $36,337 and total expenses of $63,838, with total assets amounting to $1,846,000 and total liabilities to $146,000.~~

=== Mission ===
The mission of the organization is to preserve the records of American combat fighter Aces. Part of the mission is also to educate future generations. The AFAA also awards scholarships each year.

Many of the Association's presidents have usually been aces. The organizations members are dying. In 2014 Lt. Gen. Charles "Chick" Cleveland served as president. Clayton Kelly Gross served as president in 2016 Rear Admiral Edward Feightner also served the AFAA as president.

In 2023, Dr. Randy "Duke" Cunningham was designated as president, while Colonel J. Ward Boyce Jr. was selected as vice president and Gregg P. Wagner was appointed treasurer. Cunningham died on August 27, 2025.

== Current living members ==
=== World War II ===
There are no living members from World War II following the death of Ens. Donald M. McPherson in 2025.

=== Korean War ===
There are no living members from the Korean War following the death of Lt. Gen. Charles G. Cleveland in 2021.

=== Vietnam War ===
Name	Organisation	Aerial victories
Col. Charles B. DeBellevue	USAF	6
Brig. Gen. Richard Stephen Ritchie	USAF	5
Lt. Col. Jeffrey Feinstein	USAF	5
CDR. William P. Driscoll	USN	5

== American Fighter Aces Congressional Gold Medal Act ==
The American Fighter Aces Congressional Gold Medal was awarded to every American Fighter Ace, on May 23, 2014, by the 113th Congress. President and CEO of the AFAA attended a White House ceremony with President Barack Obama to sign the bill into law.

== See also ==
- List of World War II aces from the United States
- List of World War II flying aces
