= Warren E. Thompson =

Warren E. Thompson is an author of military history, specializing in aviation and the Korean War. He has written for Osprey Publishing.

== Bibliography ==
- (with David R. McLaren) MiG Alley-Sabres vs. MiGs Over Korea. Specialty Press, 2002. ISBN 1-58007-058-2 OCLC 49226012
- F-80 Shooting Star Units over Korea. Oxford: Osprey Aviation, 2001. ISBN 1-84176-225-3 OCLC 46395019
- Bandits Over Baghdad: Personal Stories of Flying the F-117 Over Iraq. Specialty Press, 2000. ISBN 1-58007-031-0 OCLC 46079106
- F-84 Thunderjet Units over Korea. Oxford: Osprey Aviation, 2000. ISBN 1-84176-022-6 OCLC 43186482
- F-86 Sabre Fighter-bomber Units over Korea. Oxford: Osprey, 1999. ISBN 1-85532-929-8 OCLC 42444867
- F-51 Mustang Units over Korea. Oxford: Osprey, 1999. ISBN 1-85532-917-4 OCLC 41257485
- P-61 Black Widow Units of World War II. Botley: Osprey, 1998. ISBN 1-85532-725-2 OCLC 41833195
- F-86 Sabres of the 4th Fighter Interceptor Wing. Oxford: Osprey, 2002. ISBN 1-84176-287-3 OCLC 49240154
- B-26 Invader Units Over Korea. Oxford: Osprey, 2000. ISBN 1-84176-080-3 OCLC 44604510
