= Warner Bros. Discovery Global Experiences =

Division of Warner Bros. Discovery

- Formerly: Warner Bros. Global Brands and Experiences (2018–2020); Warner Bros. Global Brands and Franchises (2020–2022); Warner Bros. Discovery Global Brands and Experiences (2022–2024)
- Type: Division
- Predecessor: Warner Bros. Global Brands and Experiences; Discovery Global Enterprises
- Founded: September 13, 2018; 8 years ago December 13, 2022; 3 years ago (merger with Discovery Global Enterprises)
- Successor: Warner Bros. Global Experiences
- Headquarters: Burbank, California, United States
- Key people: Pam Lifford (president, WBGBE); Peter van Roden (SVP, Themed Entertainment); Jess Priore (VP, Themed Entertainment)
- Services: Consumer products, theme parks, attractions, publishing, recreation, and hospitality
- Parent: Warner Bros. Discovery (2022–2026); Skydance Corporation (2026–present)
- Divisions: Warner Bros. Discovery Global Consumer Products; Warner Bros. Discovery Global Themed Entertainment
- Subsidiaries: DC Comics

Warner Bros. Discovery Global Experiences is one of Warner Bros. Discovery's major business segments and divisions. It was formed in September 2018 by merging Warner Bros. Consumer Products and Warner Bros. Themed Entertainment. In April 2022, following the merger of parent company WarnerMedia and Discovery, Inc., Warner Bros. Global Brands and Franchises merged into Discovery Global Enterprises with both companies' theme park and consumers products merged as well.

== History ==
=== Predecessors ===
==== Warner Bros. Consumer Products ====
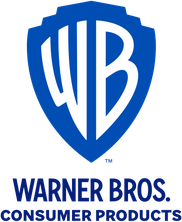
Warner Bros. Consumer Products logo

Beginning in 1984, as Warner Bros. Consumer Products was created by Dan Romanelli to license the rights of the Warner Bros. library to other companies to make merchandise. When the 1989 Tim Burton Batman film was in production, WBCP became increasingly relevant. The merchandising campaign was the largest one in history to promote a feature film. Through Warner Bros. Consumer Products licensing the rights to Batman, the studio made over $500 million through the merchandise alone.

In 1998, when Warner Bros. sold their 49% stake in Six Flags, Warner Bros. Consumer Products, Inc. began licensing the characters of Warner Bros. such as Bugs Bunny, Daffy Duck, Batman and Superman for use in the parks.

Under Romanelli, Consumer Products oversaw the licensing of Warner Bros. properties, and Warner Bros. Studio Stores. Under Mr. Romanelli's guidance, Warner Bros. Consumer Products had grown from a small licensing enterprise to a multi-business powerhouse that included Warner Bros. Worldwide Licensing, Inc., Warner Bros. Studio Stores, Inc., wbstore.com, Worldwide Publishing, Warner Bros. Interactive Entertainment, Inc., Kids' WB! Music, Warner Bros. Toys and the recently announced Live Events department.

Romanelli announced he was stepping down June 20, 2006. Brad Globe who joined Consumer Products in February 2005 as the Executive Vice President was appointed to replace him.

Brad Globe, who was made President in 2006, announced August 28, 2015, that he would be stepping down. Diane Nelson, President of DC Entertainment, took over in interim. In 2007, Warner Bros. Consumer Products licensed the theme park rights to Harry Potter to Universal Parks & Resorts for purposes of building the Wizarding World of Harry Potter at Universal Orlando Resort.

In January 2016, it was announced by Nelson that Pam Lifford, would be the new President of Warner Bros. Consumer Products, replacing Globe. On March 16, 2016, it was announced by Lifford, that Disney veteran Soo Koo who was the North American Vice President of Creative for Fashion and Home at Disney Consumer Products and Disney Stores, was joining as the new CCO for Warner Bros. Consumer Products.

==== Warner Bros. Themed Entertainment ====
The themed entertainment branch of Warner Bros. began in the early 1970s with the development of their first theme park Warner Bros. Jungle Habitat. The park opened to the public July 19, 1972. Located in West Milford, New Jersey, the 1,000-acre park was a wildlife preserve and drive through safari park. Under the leadership of President Rafael De La Sierra, the park saw over 500,000 guests in its first year.

Although initially successful, the park failed to attract repeat visitors. In 1975 Warner Bros. proposed a $20 million expansion to the park. The city was divided on the expansion fearful that it would cause further congestion on the roadways. On November 2, 1976, the town narrowly voted against the park expansion. Following the vote Warner Bros. announced the closure of the park, and that they would sell off the land.

In the late 1980s, Warner Bros. Recreational Enterprises was created due to a new partnership which was forming between them and Village Roadshow Theme Parks. It is responsible for the construction of Warner Bros. Movie World, former Warner Bros. park Warner Bros. Movie World Germany, Warner Bros. World Abu Dhabi, as well as Parque Warner Madrid.

It wasn't until the late 1980s when Warner Bros. began dabbling in the theme park industry again. Terry Semel President and Chief Operating Officer of Warner Bros. had a great working relationship with Graham Burke an executive from Village Roadshow. Together the two of them came up with the idea for a theme park on the Gold Coast of Australia. Since theme park veteran and former President of Disneyland was already employed with the company, Semel and Burke went to C. V. Wood with their idea. Once he was on board, Wood was appointed the President of the newly created Warner Bros. Recreational Enterprises to oversee the design, development and construction of the new park dubbed Warner Bros. Movie World.

The new park opened June 3, 1991 after nearly two years of construction. The 415-acre (168 ha) park, which focused on the film industry was a massive success. Unfortunately, Wood died less than a year after the opening of the park. But advisor under Wood, Nicholas Winslow was appointed the new president. Due to the success of the first park, expansion became the overall goal and Winslow along with his team began scouting locations for more parks.

In 1993, the perfect location was found in Germany with the former Bavaria Film Park in Bottrop-Kirchhellen, which had closed earlier that year. The site was selected for its high population, its convenient site access and the incentives given by the German government. At a press conference in December 1993, Warner Bros. announced its plans for the second Movie World park. The company went on to invested $250 million into the demolition of the old park and construction Warner Bros. Movie World Germany. The construction lasted roughly two years and the park's grand opening happened June 29, 1996.

By the time Parque Warner Madrid was in development, TimeWarner decided they wanted to get out of all of their fixed asset businesses, i.e. their theme parks as well as their Warner Bros. Studio Store's. By 1999 Warner Bros. had shrunk Warner Bros. International Recreational Enterprises until it was nothing more than a division under Consumer Products. Six Flags went on to complete the construction of Parque Warner Madrid and operate it. Until 2004 when they sold their shares of the park to Warner Bros.

It was announced May 2, 2016, that Peter Van Roden was appointed Senior Vice President of Warner Bros. Themed Entertainment.

=== Merged entity ===
On September 13, 2018, Pam Lifford, who originally ran the consumer products arm of the company, was promoted to head the newly created division Warner Bros. Global Brands and Experiences. The new division was created to oversee Warner Bros. Consumer Products, Warner Bros. Themed Entertainment, DC Entertainment and a newly created global franchise team for all Warner IP except for the Harry Potter/Wizarding World franchise. The Wizarding World franchise would continued to be handled by Harry Potter Global Franchise Development president Josh Berger, who would continue to report to WB chairman/CEO Kevin Tsujihara. The creation of the new division was part of a new initiative to move Warner Bros. businesses and products closer to the customer than ever before. With the March 2019, WarnerMedia reorganization of its direct reporting units, Warner Bros. received consumer product responsibility from all WarnerMedia units.

In April 2022, following the merger of parent company WarnerMedia and Discovery, Inc., Discovery Global Enterprises and Discovery Consumer Products were merged into Warner Bros. Global Brands and Franchises. The division's theme parks unit was folded into Warner Bros. Themed Entertainment as the theme park attractions and the division's consumer products unit was folded into Warner Bros. Consumer Products. The Discovery Destinations parks joined the theme park division, while Discovery Consumer Products (founded on April 6, 2018) merged/folded into Warner Bros. Consumer Products to form Warner Bros. Discovery Global Consumer Products.

== Warner Resorts ==
=== Current operations ===
Locations of current Warner Bros. resorts.

==== Warner Bros. Movie World ====
A joint effort between Warner Bros. Recreational Enterprises and Village Roadshow Theme Parks, a concept for a theme park began forming in 1989. Warner Bros. Movie World was envisioned by C. V. Wood and opened on June 3, 1991, in Gold Coast, Queensland, Australia. The park opened as a salute to the entertainment industry, allowing guests the opportunity to become part of the movie to re-enact scenes. The park also offered a learning opportunity to showcase the behind the scenes hard work that goes into making a blockbuster film. In 2006, TimeWarner sold their stock in the park to Village Roadshow Theme Parks relinquishing ownership of the park.

==== Parque Warner Madrid ====
Opening April 5, 2002, as Warner Bros. Movie World Madrid/Warner Bros. Park Madrid was a joint venture between Warner Bros. Recreational Enterprises and Six Flags. The park was owned in a joint-venture of various shareholders and partnerships with the community of Madrid holding the most at 40%. Six Flags operated the park and owned a 5% minority stake. Warner Bros. Park was not included in the sale of the Six Flags European Parks division to Palamon Capital Partners in 2004 and their operations contract was terminated in November 2004, transferring over to the park's management while Warner Bros. took over Six Flags' stake. The park was renamed Parque Warner Madrid in 2006 and Parques Reunidos took over ownership and operations the following year with Warner Bros. retaining their minority stake. The park saw expansion in 2014 with the opening of a new water park dubbed Parque Warner Beach.

==== Warner Bros. World Abu Dhabi ====
Warner Bros. World Warner's fourth branded theme park outside the United States, opened July 25, 2018. Located on Yas Island in Abu Dhabi it features six themed areas, and it set to open its first hotel The WB Abu Dhabi in 2021. It is the second theme park outside the United States that bears the Warner Bros. name that they do not own. Rather the characters and WB name is licensed to it through Warner Bros. Consumer Products, and Warner Bros. Themed Entertainment.

=== Former operations ===
==== Warner Bros. Jungle Habitat ====
Originally opening in 1972 in New Jersey, Jungle Habitat was Warner Bros. first venture into the theme park industry. Although the park was initially successful it failed to attract repeat guests. After an expansion proposal was voted against by the city Warner Bros. closed the park in 1976.

==== Warner Bros. Movie World Germany ====
Formerly being a non-profitable theme park, Warner Bros. purchased the land that was Bavaria Film Park in 1994 and began construction on Warner Bros. Movie World Germany. With a star-studded grand opening celebration June 29, 1996, the park formally opened to the public the following day. In 1999, Time Warner sold the park to Premier Parks (now Six Flags Entertainment Corporation), who continued to operate the park under license from Warner Bros. as part of their European Parks division until selling the park to StarParks, a subsidiary of Palamon Capital Partners, in 2004. The company then re-branded the park as Movie Park Germany in 2005, removing all Warner Bros. themes and licensing.

==== Cartoon Network Amazone ====
Cartoon Network Amazone was an entirely Cartoon Network branded water park in Sattahip, Chonburi, Thailand. Opening officially October 3, 2014, the water park was run by The Amazon Falls Company under license from Turner Broadcasting System Asia Pacific.

In 2021, the park was refurbished with a new theme and license, becoming the Columbia Pictures Aquaverse.

=== Abandoned and misreported concepts ===
In the 1970s Warner Bros. and DC Comics had started planning a new theme park, The Amazing World of Superman. It was set to be built in Metropolis, Illinois, and was set to open in 1972. Unfortunately due to the gas embargo the plans fell through.

In the 1990s under the leadership of Nicholas Winslow various locations were looked at for the possibility of building the next Warner Bros. Movie World Park.

On February 13, 1996, at a press conference in London, England Winslow along with fellow executive Sandy Reisenbach represented Warner Bros. at the announcement of Warner Bros. Movie World England. At the time Recreational Enterprises was working with the Mills & Allen International group, the then-owner of regional television stations Anglia and Meridian Television, to develop the park. The project was projected to cost £225 million to develop the 150-acre site in Hillingdon and to build the new sound stages and attractions, it was estimated to create 3,000 jobs for the surrounding area. By the next day the project was being vigorously opposed by objectors, including three local Members of the U.K. Parliament from the Conservative Party. Plans for Movie World England were cancelled later that year with no large announcement.

Later on in 1996, Winslow took a trip to Pudong, Shanghai to discuss building a park in China. However, things did not line up, with Warner Bros. slowing down their theme park division and the land being too expensive Warner Bros. Movie World Shanghai was abandoned. Later on Disney ended up buying the land for the Shanghai Disney Resort.

=== Properties outside Warner Parks ===
Some Warner-owned franchises are licensed to be used in non-Warner Bros. owned theme parks in United States and in some countries in Asia. The Wizarding World of Harry Potter a themed land featuring characters and settings from the Wizarding World has operated at Universal Orlando since June 18, 2010. Additional Harry Potter themed lands were opened at Universal Studios Japan on July 15, 2014, Universal Studios Hollywood on April 7, 2016, and Universal Studios Beijing on September 20, 2021. Under a 2007 agreement between Warner Bros. and Universal Destinations & Experiences, the latter has the rights to use the Wizarding World characters and settings until July 1, 2019, with options to renew the license for two five-year terms ending June 30, 2024, and June 30, 2029. This 2007 agreement covers the original themed land built at Universal Islands of Adventures.

Since the 1990s, Warner Bros. Consumer Products has licensed characters such as Looney Tunes, Hanna-Barbera and DC Comics to Six Flags for usage throughout the United States in theme parks, excluding the Las Vegas metropolitan area.

== See also ==
- Warner Bros. Studio Tour
- Disney Experiences, Disney's equivalent branch of their company.
