= G. William Oakley =

American actor (1937–2010)

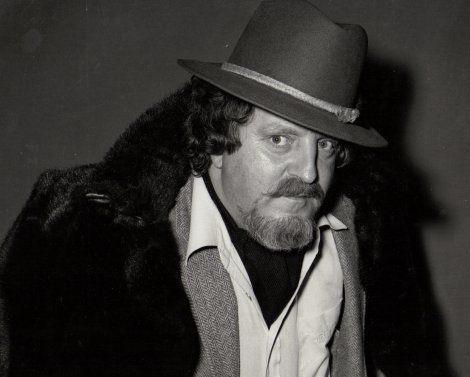
- Born: March 19, 1937; Cherokee, Oklahoma
- Died: October 30, 2010 (aged 73)
- Other names: Bill Oakley
- Occupation: Theatre Producer

G. William "Bill" Oakley, Jr. (March 19, 1937 – October 30, 2010) was a theatrical producer-director-actor and seminal figure in the revival of early American theater, melodrama and vaudeville with theaters in Colorado and Missouri.

Dubbed "Barnum of the Buttes" by The Denver Post, Oakley is best known for G. William Oakley's Heritage Square Opera House "Nostalgic Theater" adaptations of such classic melodrama as The Drunkard, The Streets of New York, and Sweeney Todd, literary works such as Dr. Jekyll and Mr. Hyde, Frankenstein, and Sherlock Holmes, and original works including Call of the Yukon. In his productions, Oakley was a champion of improvisation and audience participation. His productions also featured "vaudeville olio" variety numbers showcasing the musical and comedic talents of his repertory company interspersing jokes with modern-day spoofs ranging from Shakespeare's Romeo and Juliet as houseflies to Michael Jackson's "Thriller".

Oakley's Heritage Square Opera House in Golden, Colorado (1971–1988) and the historic Goldenrod Showboat at Laclede's Landing on the St. Louis Mississippi waterfront (1975–1985) became popular icons for his brand of theater.

== Family background and early life ==
Oakley was born March 19, 1937, in Cherokee, Oklahoma, to Eula Mae Hutson Oakley and George William Oakley Sr., an electrical engineer, and was raised in Oklahoma, Washington State and Colorado. He was graduated from Centennial High School, Pueblo in 1955 and moved to Denver in 1958 where he worked as a meter reader. In 1962 Oakley moved to Marin County, California. In 1962–63 he worked as a house parent at Sunny Hills Residential Treatment Center for Children in San Anselmo where he met Rayda Pomroy whom he married in 1963. Their son was born November 1963 in San Jose, California.

In 1964 they moved to Pueblo, Colorado, where Oakley attended Southern Colorado State College (now Colorado State University-Pueblo) and graduated in 1965 with a Bachelor of Arts degree in Theater and Education. At CSU he met his mentor Dr. Dean Wenstrom who convinced him to try stage acting, which led to his first role as William of Normandy in Alfred, Lord Tennyson's Harold.

Oakley taught theater and English at Loveland High School, Colorado, from 1965 to 1968. His and Rayda's daughter was born in Loveland in 1967.

Oakley studied for his masters at Colorado State University in Ft. Collins and in 1969, completing his thesis on "The Theatrical History of Cripple Creek from 1891 to 1896".

From 1967 to 1970 his career as a director and actor included Buckskin Joe in Cañon City, Colorado (1967); the Red Ram in Larimer Square, Denver (fall and winter 1969); the Oxford Hotel, Denver; and the Iron Springs Chateau in Manitou Springs, Colorado (1968, 1969, 1970)

It was at the old West theme park, Buckskin Joe in Cañon City, Colorado (1967) where Oakley first developed his comic improvisation and audience participatory style of melodrama that would become his trademark. From 1967 to 1970 his career as a director and actor included Buckskin Joe, the Red Ram in Larimer Square, Denver (fall and winter 1969); the Oxford Hotel, Denver; and many of the performers would move on to the Iron Springs Chateau in Manitou Springs, Colorado (1968, 1969, 1970); and Estes Park, Colorado.

Oakley's Heritage Square Opera House in Golden, Colorado (1971–1988) and the historic Goldenrod Showboat in St. Louis (1975–1984) became the most popular icons for his brand of theater.

== Heritage Square Opera House in Golden Colorado (1971–1988) ==
In 1970, having built a reputation for his style of melodrama, vaudeville, ragtime and traditional jazz, the management at Heritage Square in Golden, Colorado sought after Oakley to bring his brand of comedy to Golden. Heritage Square is a replica of an old West town located in the Rocky Mountain foothills between the City of Golden and Town of Morrison, Colorado, just west of Denver. From 1971 to 1973 Oakley in partnership with his brother Donald Oakley – in part financed by the sale of Don's car – established the first 200-seat Heritage Square Opera House in the location of what later became the General Store. Co-Founder of their newly formed Gaslight Enterprises, Donald was the Executive Vice President in charge of business management. G.W. Oakley designed the building interior and wrote and directed the melodramas, usually derived from original Victorian-era melodrama scripts, and vaudeville "olio" reminiscent of Victorian-era variety shows in a format of jokes interspersed with musical and comedy performance. Melodramas were inspired with Oakley's style of comedy and improvisation for which he became known. The original repertory company included Oakley, who notoriously played the villain. Beer and wine were served during the show along with popcorn, which Oakley encouraged audience members to throw onstage at the villain during the show, the beginning of a long tradition. Oakley said his favorite part of the show as the Olio where he incorporated modern-day themes and movies such as a production of Michael Jackson's "Thriller" spoof on film noir. When starting rehearsal for a new show he said he looked for moments when people were funny and said "people don't always know when they're funny". In 1973 the Oakley brothers opened a new Opera House on an adjacent site of an unfinished storefront. He designed the new 350-seat, two-story venue top to bottom as a dinner-theater that operated under the imprimatur Gaslight Enterprises DBA G. William Oakley's Heritage Square Opera House. The theatre had 52 box seats in the balcony, with the main floor divided into the "pit" of some 70 seats in front of the stage, behind which were raked rows of long bench-like tables and chairs where people were served from a full bar throughout the show. Before the show a buffet dinner was served upstairs in a full dining room and adjoining piano-bar lounge while vintage silent films with live piano accompaniment were featured before the show in the theater. Oakley traditionally opened the show with announcements of birthdays and anniversaries in his popular comedy improvisational style. He introduced the hero, heroine and villain and primed the audience to respond on cue to their entrances during the show with a "Yay!", "Awww!", or "Boo!", which the crowd did with great enthusiasm. Opening night for "G. William Oakley's Heritage Square Opera House" was July 10, 1973. Oakley recounted everyone working to the last minute including his wife and Scenic Designer Rayda Oakley hanging wallpaper and painting. Although the doors for the bathrooms were not hung, among other things, Oakley insisted the show must go on for opening night and the entire audience was treated to complimentary dinner and show. The show was "Down the Black Canyon", the evening was a big hit and Oakley's Opera House was well on its way to making history in Colorado.

Oakley became sole proprietor of the theater in 1977 and managed the business until 1988. Today the theater is owned and operated as the Heritage Square Music Hall by T.J. Mullin who began as an actor for the 1973 opening night of the new Opera House and who later became a key figure in Opera House fame. Oakley's Heritage Square Opera House and Goldenrod Showboat employed hundreds of people from 1971 to 1988 and Oakley prided himself in knowing by name all his employees as well as their interests. Former employees routinely credit him for the training he provided and many of them continued on to Broadway and Hollywood in stage, movies and television. "From Hollywood to Broadway and across the US, performers and employees have attributed much of their success to G.William Oakley's recognition of their talent, to his perfectionism, his tutelage and direction."

== The Goldenrod Showboat ==
From 1975 to 1984 Oakley produced his "nostalgic theater" on the then moored on the St. Louis waterfront beneath the Gateway Arch "Gateway to the West". The Goldenrod was managed by Gaslight-Goldenrod Associates, DBA G. William Oakley's Goldenrod Showboat. Gaslight-Goldenrod Associates was a combination of investors from Gaslight Enterprises aka the Heritage Square Opera House, and theater producer Frank Pierson and his business partner Don Franz of the St. Louis Ragtimers trio. Pierson and Franz had acquired and renovated the 1909 showboat after its destruction by a 1962 fire. Goldenrod Showboat became a designated U.S. National Historic Landmark in 1967. She was placed on the "Threatened Historical Landmarks" list in 2001. One of two remaining examples of the modern era of showboats that ended in the 1920s, the Goldenrod was the largest and most elaborately decorated of the showboats and believed by some historians to have been the inspiration for Edna Ferber's classic Show Boat. Under Oakley's direction the Goldenrod mirrored its sister theater in Colorado as dinner-theater that included a buffet dinner with piano entertainment, silent films with live piano accompaniment, the comedy melodrama and vaudeville olio repertory cast, and shared a traveling creative team and production crew with the Opera House in Colorado. Between the two locations, Oakley mounted 12 to 14 original productions each year.

== Annual National Ragtime and Traditional Jazz Festival (Ragfest) ==
A lover and aficionado of ragtime and traditional jazz music, Oakley was a fan of the St. Louis Jazz Festival, which he acquired in 1975. Oakley produced the Annual National Ragtime and Traditional Jazz Festival from 1975 to 1984 with the Goldenrod as host of the week-long event that featured famed singer Pat Yankee and the Turk Murphy Jazz Band of San Francisco, Carol Leigh, Lew Green and the Original Salty Dogs of Chicago, a dozen other bands and score of solo musicians who entertained in the Goldenrod's theater and festival's adjoining barges. Thousands of people paid for admission to the many stages while others flocked along the levee to the "cheap seats" where they were able to enjoy the music free of charge. After leaving the Goldenrod in 1984 Oakley continued to produce the Annual National Ragtime and Traditional Jazz Festival in Heritage Square until 1987.

== Broadway ==
Oakley's career also took him to New York City and Broadway. In 1979 Oakley worked as a comedic consultant with producers Ashton Springer and Frank Pierson for the musical Whoopee which played six months on Broadway. The revival of the 1928 Eddie Cantor vehicle Broadway musical started at the Goodspeed Theater Opera House in East Haddam, CT. Oakley later directed the show's national tour, which received rave notices throughout its nine-month run. Oakley also was an investor in the popular Torch Song Trilogy in 1982 when the show went to Broadway. Off-Broadway he produced Basin Street at the Henry Street Theater in 1983 with the famed Turk Murphy Jazz Band, singer Pat Yankee and Broadway actress Sandra Reaves-Phillips. In Denver the show was produced as Storyville and was the last mainstage production at Denver's Bonfils Memorial Theatre.

== The Wynkoop Cabaret ==
In 1992–93 Bill Oakley partnered with Gail Spencer and John Hickenlooper in The Wynkoop Cabaret in Hickenlooper's popular Wynkoop Brewing Company, Denver's oldest micro-brewery-restaurant. Shows included Frank Ferrante in An Evening with Groucho as a one-man show sanctioned by Groucho Marx's son, Arthur Marx, for whom Ferrante played Groucho in his critically acclaimed Broadway show, Groucho: A Life in Revue. Also of note was the Rick and Ruby Rock and Roll Revival musical comedy directed by Bob Lacey and starring Monica Ganas, Rick Right and J. Raoul Brody, which enjoyed an extended run, and the musical revue Dawgs, a spoof of the Broadway shows Cats, by Milt Larson of Hollywood's Magic Castle fame.

== Retirement ==
In retirement Oakley traveled extensively with his wife to Europe, Asia, Egypt, Canada, Latin America and throughout the U.S. He resided in Georgetown, Colorado, and Daytona Beach, Florida. He became known for his gourmet culinary skills, and was very proud of serving for 12 years on the board of the John Tomay Memorial Library in Georgetown.

Melodrama and humor was Oakley's forte in life and on stage. When asked, Oakley said, "I'd like to be remembered as Cary Grant with a martini."
