= Goldenrod (showboat) =

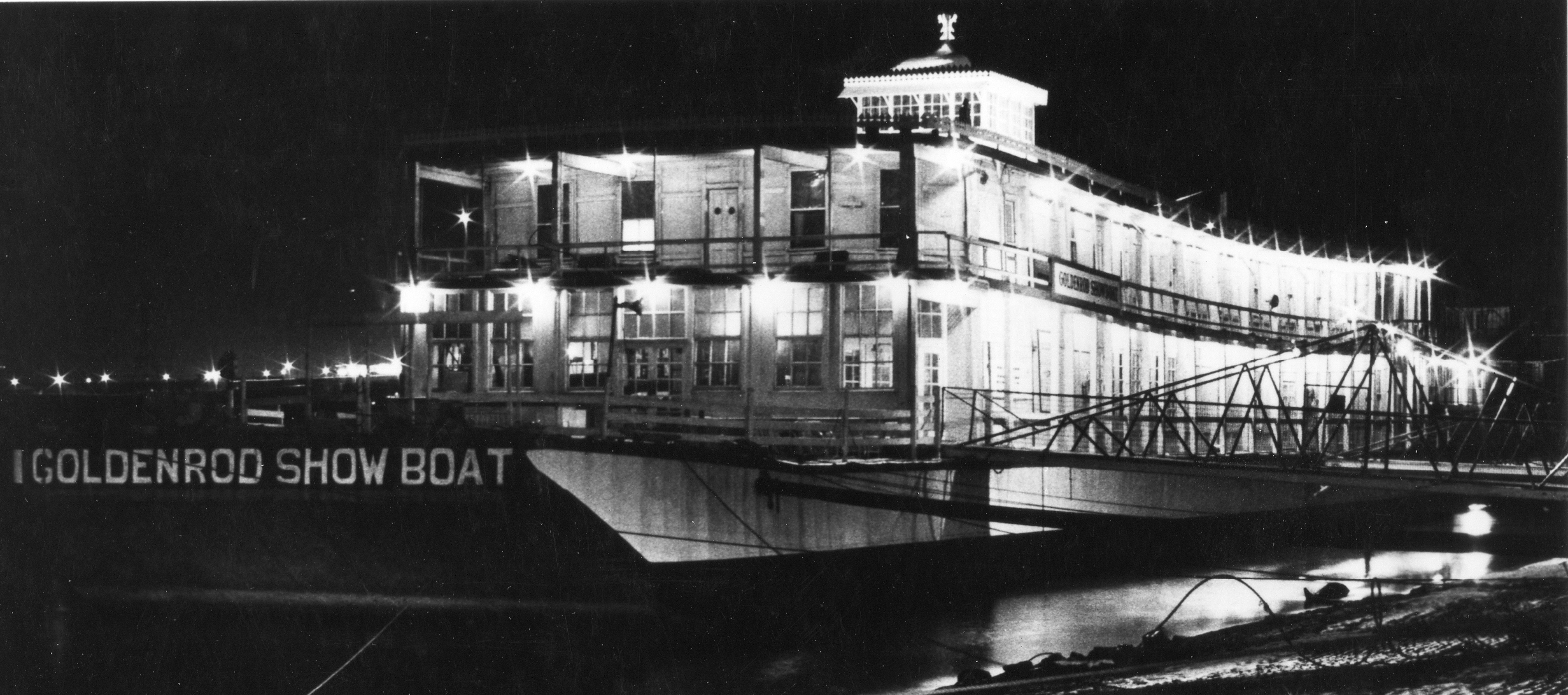
- Goldenrod in the 1980s

History
- Builder: Pope Dock Company
- Cost: $75,000
- Launched: 1909
- Fate: Burned on 21 October 2017

General characteristics
- Length: 200 ft (61 m)
- Beam: 45 ft (14 m)
- Goldenrod (Showboat)
- U.S. National Register of Historic Places
- Former U.S. National Historic Landmark
- St. Louis Landmark
- Location within Illinois
- Location: Kampsville, Illinois
- Coordinates: 39°20′27″N 90°37′09″W
- Built: 1909
- Architect: Pope Dock Co.
- NRHP reference No.: 67000029

Significant dates
- Added to NRHP: 24 December 1967
- Designated NHL: 24 December 1967
- Delisted NHL: 11 December 2023

Goldenrod was a floating theater, known as a showboat, which operated on the Mississippi River and its tributaries throughout the 20th Century. She was designated a U.S. National Historic Landmark on 24 December 1967 and a St. Louis, Missouri City Landmark in 1972. The boat was placed on the 'Threatened Historical Landmarks' list in 2001. On 21 October 2017, the boat burned to its hull and was sold for scrap. In a meeting held 15–16 August 2023, the National Park System Advisory Board (NPSAB) recommended to withdraw the National Historic Landmark designation of Goldenrod due to her loss of historical integrity. Her landmark designation was withdrawn in December 2023.

As an example of the modern era of showboats that ended in the 1920s, Goldenrod was the largest and most elaborately decorated of the showboats. She provided entertainment in the form of minstrel shows, vaudeville, and serious drama. The boat was designed in the manner of a 19th-century showboat rather than a late 20th century one, in other words, not like a paddlewheeler steamboat. She was designed in the "Steamboat Gothic" style.

== History ==
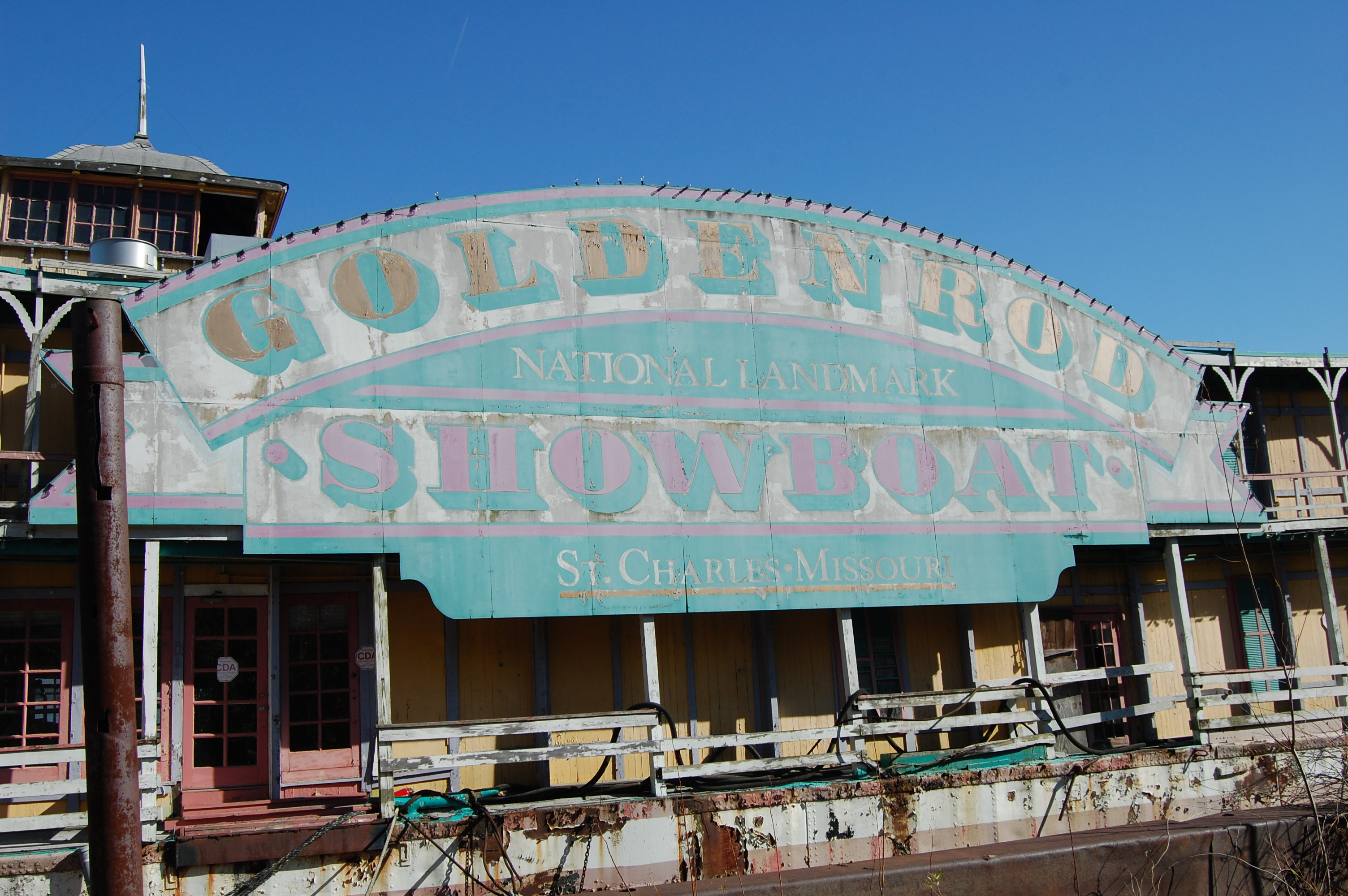
Goldenrod Showboat Sign

Goldenrod was built in 1909 by Pope Dock Company of Parkersburg, West Virginia, for W.R. Markle at a cost of $75,000. At 200 feet (61 m) long and 45 feet (14 m) wide, she had an auditorium 162 feet (49 m) long with twenty-one red velour upholstered boxes and a seating capacity of 1,400.

In 1910, twenty-two showboats plied the Mississippi, visiting 15 midwestern states. (Showboats were typically non-powered barges with entertainment palaces built upon them.) By 1928, this number had dwindled to twelve, and by 1938, only four remained in operation. In 1943, only the Goldenrod remained. Between the Great Depression, movies, and increased mobility, the days of the showboat were all but over.

R.W. Emerson took ownership of Goldenrod around 1913 with an auction bid of $11,000. Seating capacity was reduced to 1300 under his ownership in order to widen the center aisle.

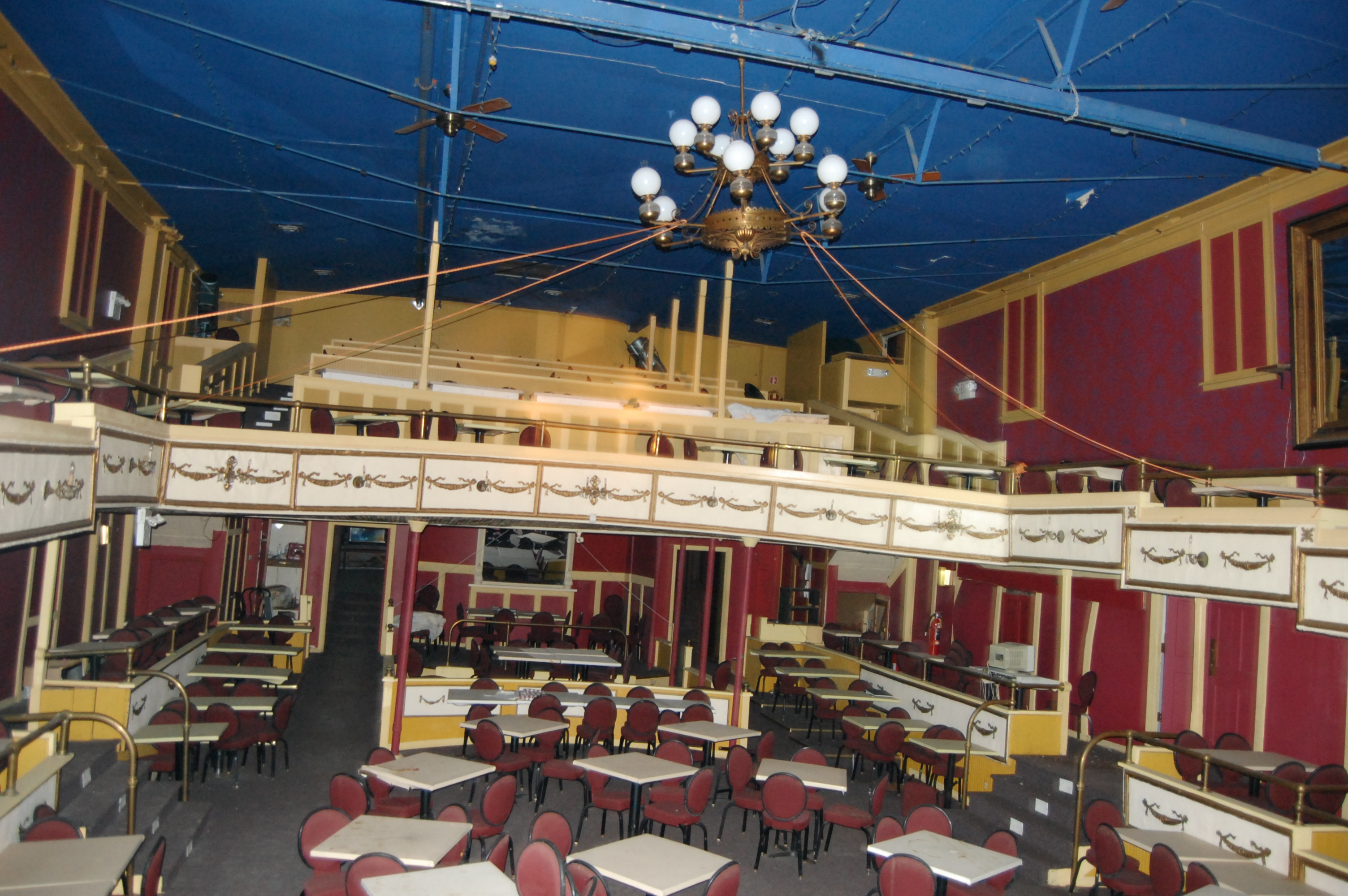
Goldenrod Theater

Goldenrod was the last showboat to work the Mississippi. Under the ownership of Capt. Bill Menke, she was moored at the St. Louis riverfront in 1937. In 1947, the original wooden hull was placed into a steel barge at the St. Louis Shipbuilding & Steel Company. By 1950, she had been partially sunk and salvaged twice. Shows were still being staged and, for 75 cents a head, St. Louis playgoers could board the boat and "sass the actors" on stage.

On 1 June 1962, a disastrous fire, caused by an electrical short, all but destroyed the superstructure of the auditorium and caused severe damage to the entire structure. The Goldenrod was then purchased by a group of St. Louis businessmen headed by Frank C. Pierson and Don Franz, and restored to her original glory, and beyond. Plush carpeting was laid in the auditorium, with cabaret seating, under a huge crystal chandelier. Many antique appointments were salvaged from old St. Louis mansions being torn down. Brass fixtures and rails were restored or replaced, as was the tin ceiling and elaborate woodwork. A cocktail lounge was added, with a small bandstand where the St. Louis Ragtimers band played traditional ragtime for many years. The upstairs staterooms were converted into a buffet dining room. When this $300,000 renovation was completed, Goldenrod had her Grand Re-Opening in May 1965. In 1967, she was registered as a National Historic Landmark. Mr. Pierson also owned the Becky Thatcher, a former packet boat, traveling no more but moored beside Goldenrod, featuring a restaurant, lounges, and gift shop.

== On the levee ==
Beginning in the early 1960s to about 1985, the National Ragtime Festival at St. Louis was held in June aboard Goldenrod. Many vintage jazz and ragtime bands were featured, including Turk Murphy and The Salty Dogs. From 1975 to 1984, Goldenrod was operated as a sister theater to the Heritage Square Opera House in Golden, Colorado, presenting a unique style of melodrama plus vaudeville olio, in a high energy format created by G. William Oakley of Denver, Colorado. During this same period, the National Ragtime Festivals, produced by Oakley, became an annual phenomenon on the St. Louis riverfront.

== St. Charles ==
In 1989, Goldenrod was purchased by the city of St. Charles for $300,000 and moved to the historic Missouri River town. She was restored and renovated, costing the city about 3.5 million dollars over the next 12 years. The dinner theater continued to operate as a popular attraction. In 2001, she was run aground after Missouri River levels ran low. Goldenrod was closed due to Coast Guard structural repair requirements. The repair estimates were much higher than expected, and the city council decided to sell her in 2002.

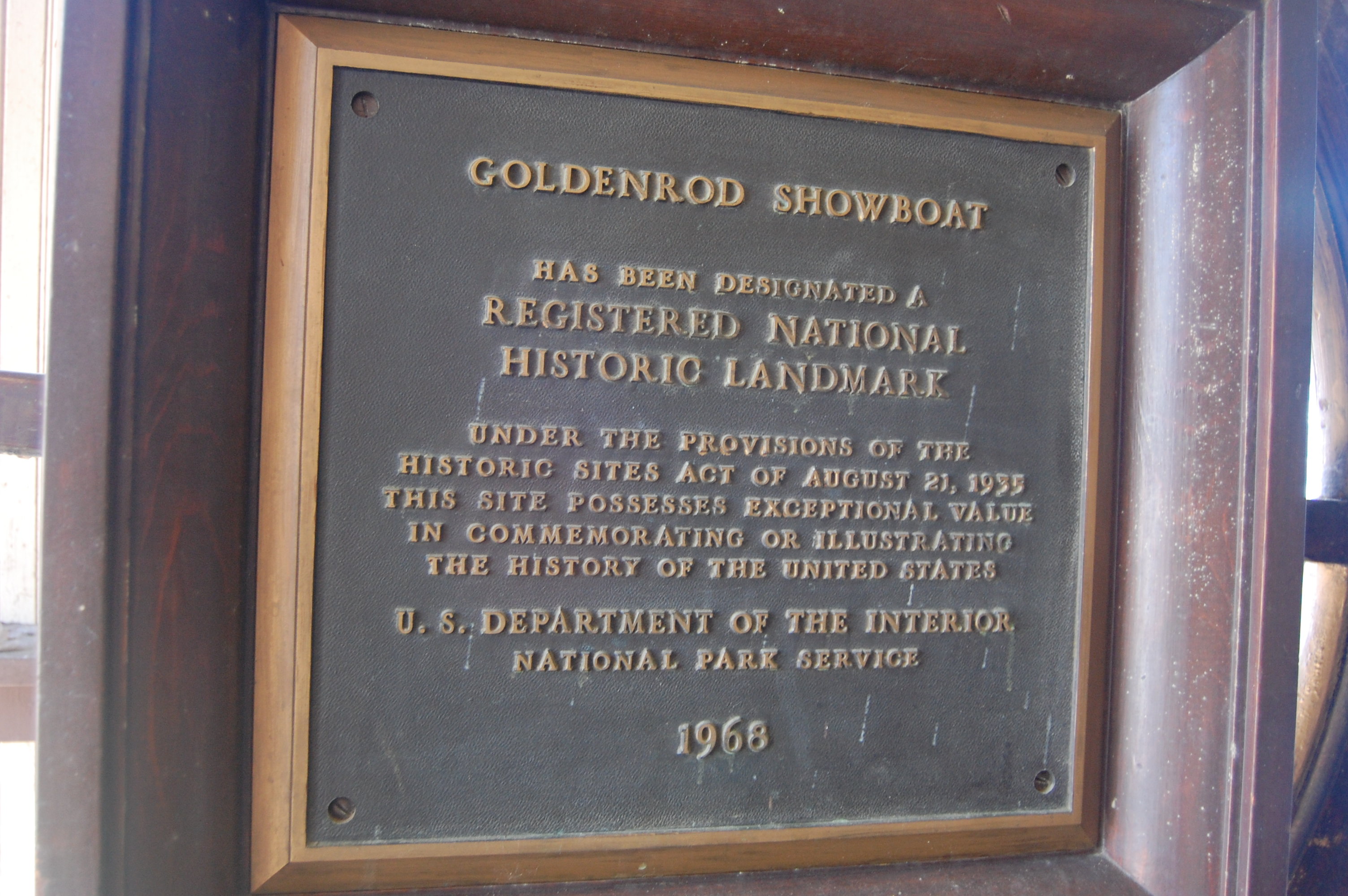
National historic register

== Sale ==
When no one offered to buy her, the council decided to give her away. Four groups submitted proposals, and the council chose Lewis and Clark Landing, a firm headed by John Schwarz. Goldenrod was moved to storage near the Poplar Street Bridge in downtown St. Louis. Later she was moored on the Illinois River near Kampsville, Illinois.

Schwarz' original intention was to place her in a protective basin to be constructed near her mooring location, but the plan never happened. Instead, Goldenrod was towed to a mooring spot next to the tugboat America, which was owned by Shelia Prokuski and Randy Newingham.

=== Legal suits ===
In 2006, a civil suit was filed against Schwarz in an attempt to collect $24,000 in mooring fees owed to Prokuski. The case was supposed to have been settled, with Schwarz retaining ownership of Goldenrod while he found new mooring for the boat. Schwarz did not move the boat, and she was sold at a sheriff's auction in October 2007. Since there were no other bids on her, Prokuski bought her for $5,000.

In 2003, the vessel was moved and moored in Calhoun County.

As of 15 January 2008, questions remained about the legality of the sale. The judge, Richard Greenleaf, said the proper paperwork had not been filed for the auction, so he had not signed off on the sale. The couple wanted to sell Goldenrod, but had to wait until the title cleared. Though it has been reported they wanted to sell the historic boat for scrap, Newingham has denied this.

== Historic Riverboat Preservation Association ==
In 2008, Historic Riverboat Preservation Association formed, led by Steve Debellis and Jacob Medford, to restore the Goldenrod. Schwarz donated the boat to the nonprofit association in 2008.

The association wanted to keep the Goldenrod as a civic asset, such as returning her to downtown St. Louis or in a Forest Park lake.

In May 2013, a court-ordered auction was held to recover over $69,000 in unpaid mooring fees to the dock owner, Pool 24 Tug Service. After gaining ownership during the foreclosure auction, the dock owners agreed to wait to scrap the boat and give the association the chance to buy the boat back. In February 2014, the association attempted to raise funds to repurchase the boat. In 2016, the dock owners donated the boat back to the association to avoid the cost of salvaging the structure.

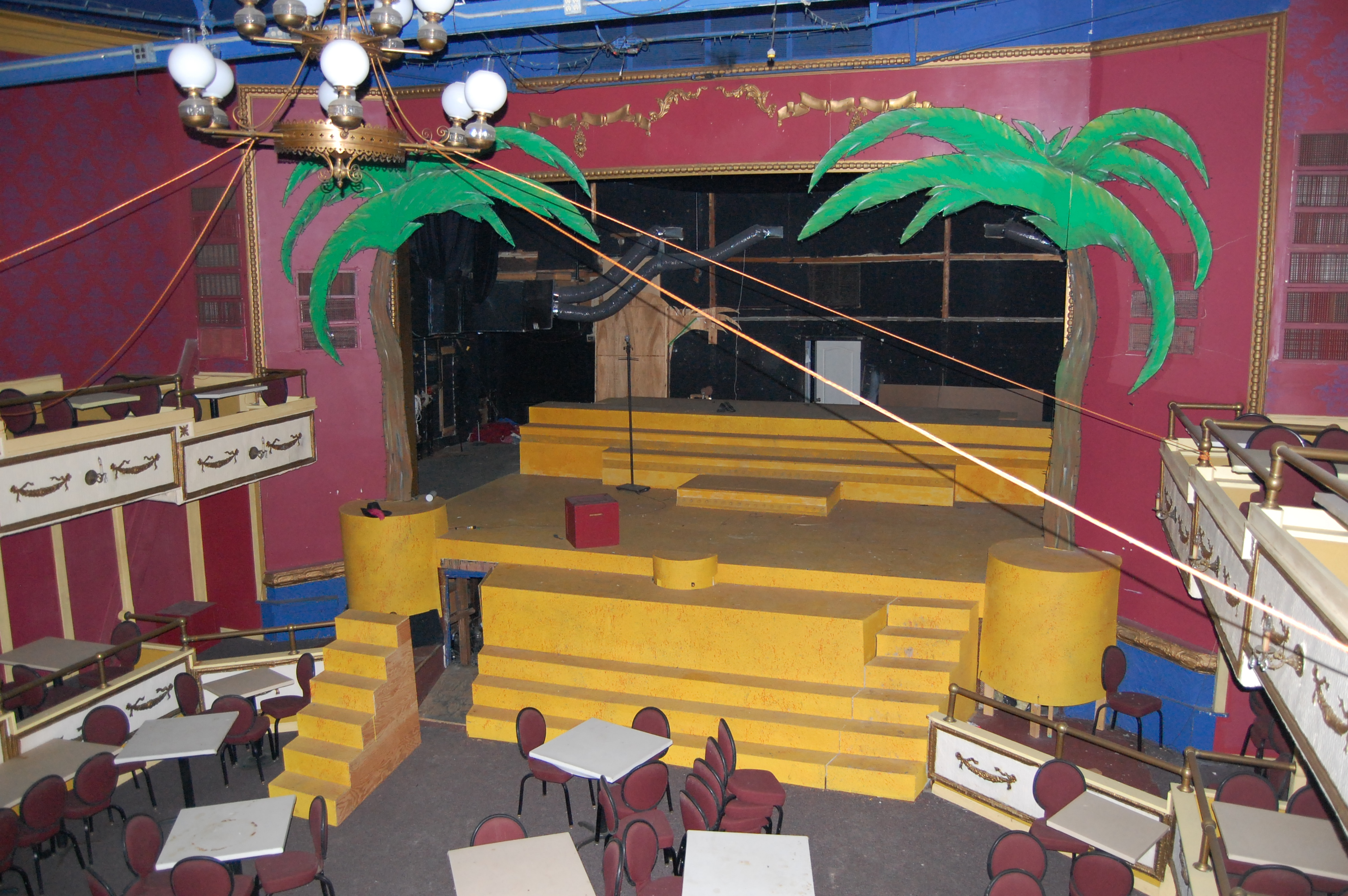
Balcony to stage

== Damage and Destruction ==
In 2015, the hull buckled when the vessel ended up on uneven land after river levels dropped suddenly while she was being moved to the riverbank.

With insufficient funds to save the ship, the Historic Riverboat Preservation Association decided to save the pilothouse and as much of the interior furnishings as possible for incorporation into museum displays. Work on removing interior furnishings such as chandeliers, gilded mirrors, and photographs proceeded on Saturdays and Sundays from that point until 31 March 2016. On 1 April 2016, the vessel was given to the owners of the dock where she was moored.

In May 2017, the boat was stuck on a sandbar and took on about 7 feet of water as river levels rose.

Goldenrod was destroyed by fire on 21 October 2017 and the remnants were sold for scrap.

== Famous entertainers ==
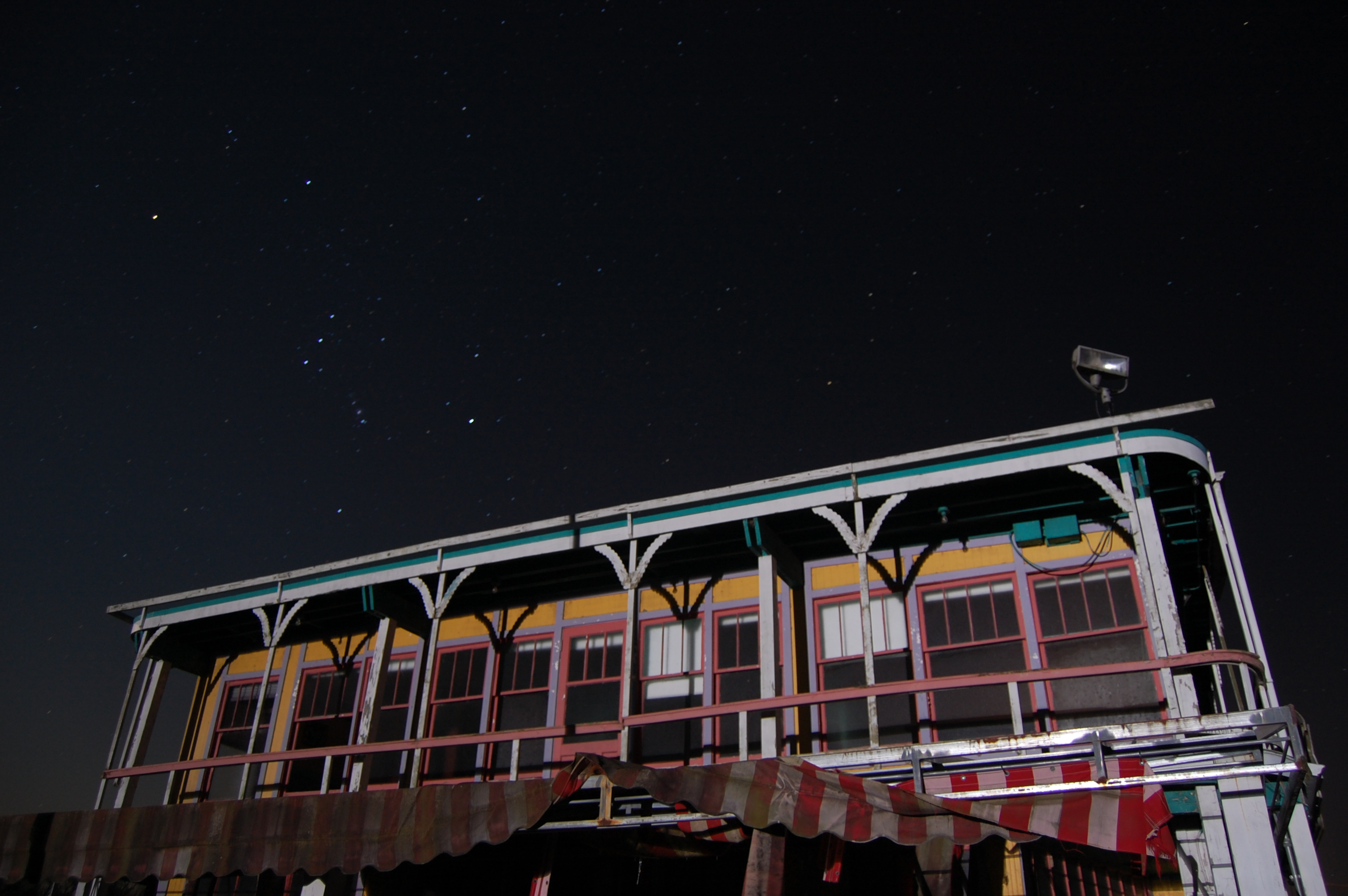
Night time on the boat

Several notable entertainers have performed on Goldenrod, including Red Skelton, Pearl Bailey, Cab Calloway and Bob Hope.

Goldenrod served as an inspiration for Edna Ferber's novel Show Boat.

== See also ==
- List of National Historic Landmarks in Missouri
- List of National Historic Landmarks in Illinois
