= Dick Kelsey =

Animation art director, theme park designer and illustrator (1905–1987)

- Born: Richmond Kelsey; May 3, 1905; Ventura, California, U.S.
- Died: May 3, 1987 (age 82); Camarillo, California, U.S.
- Occupations: Artist, designer

Dick Kelsey (May 3, 1905 – May 3, 1987), born Richmond I. Kelsey, was an important American early animation art director, pioneer theme park designer, and illustrator of children's books.

== Early life and career ==
Kelsey was born in Ventura, California, and studied at Otis Art Institute and the Santa Barbara School of the Arts. In the 1930s he painted and exhibited in Santa Barbara. He served in the U.S. Marines during World War II.

Kelsey's career spanned several Disney films of the 1940s and 1950s, after which he assisted in the design of Disneyland in 1955. He taught at Otis Art Institute and the Santa Barbara School of the Arts. Translating the screen arts to real buildings, Kelsey was hired by the Marco Engineering firm of Cornelius Vanderbilt Wood to be a lead art director to design Magic Mountain theme park at Golden, Colorado in 1957. Later Kelsey became mentor to another prominent Disney artisan, Ron Dias, whose films include Sleeping Beauty. In time, Kelsey returned to Disney work, including Bedknobs and Broomsticks and illustrating children's books of Disney films. He died on his 82nd birthday, at a care home in Camarillo, California.

== Filmography ==
=== Art department ===
- So Dear to My Heart (1948)

=== Art director ===
- Pinocchio (1940)
- Fantasia ("Rite of Spring" segment) (1940)
- Dumbo (1941)
- Bambi (1942)

=== Miscellaneous crew ===
- Melody Time (1948)
- Bedknobs and Broomsticks (1971)

=== Writer ===
- Make Mine Music (1946)
- Alice in Wonderland (1951)

== Architecture ==
=== Art director ===
- Magic Mountain (1957)

=== Assistant designer ===
- Disneyland (1955)
