= Nicholas Winslow =

American businessman

- Born: February 24, 1943 (age 83)
- Education: Stanford University (M.B.A.); Pomona College (B.A.)
- Occupation: Entertainment executive
- Years active: 1967–present
- Board member of: Los Angeles County Inter-Agency Council on Child Abuse and Neglect

Nicholas Scott Winslow (born February 24, 1943) is an American businessman. Winslow was the President of the recreational enterprises division of Warner Bros. from 1992 to 1999, as a result he made the announcements about theme parks in development. Prior to Warner, Winslow was the Vice President (V.P.) of rival film studio Paramount Pictures for their technical subsidiaries from 1975 to 1980.

== Paramount Pictures ==
During Winslow's time with Paramount he served as the President to various minor subsidiaries such as Paramount Sound, Magicam Inc., and Future General Corp.

== Warner Bros. Recreational Enterprises ==
When Winslow joined Warner Bros. in 1992, he was an adviser to the then President of Warner Bros. Recreational Enterprises C. V. Wood. When Wood died on March 14, Warner Bros.' Co-Chief executive officer's (CEO) Terry Semel and Robert A. Daly chose Winslow to lead the theme park division.

With expansion the main goal, Winslow began scouting locations for the next Movie World park, in his pursuit to find the perfect location he came upon golden opportunity in Bottrop, Germany, the site for the former Bavaria Film theme park. In December 1993, it was announced that Warner Bros. Recreational Enterprises would demolish the former Bavaria Film Park which had closed in earlier that year, and use the empty site to build Warner Bros. Movie World Germany. In May 1994 the sale of the park to Warner Bros. was finalized and construction began. The construction lasted roughly two years and the park's grand opening happened June 29, 1996. Winslow served as the host for the grand opening ceremony which was in attendance by stars like Chris O'Donnell, and Michael Douglas

On February 13, 1996, at a press conference in London, England Winslow along with fellow executive Sandy Reisenbach represented Warner Bros. at the announcement of Warner Bros. Movie World England. At the time Recreational Enterprises was working with the Mills & Allen International group, the owner of local news stations ITV Anglia and ITV Meridian, to develop the park. The project was projected to cost £225 million to develop the 150-acre site in Hillingdon and to build the new sound stages and attractions, it was estimated to create 3,000 jobs for the surrounding area. By the next day the project was being vigorously opposed by objectors, including three local Tory MPs. Plans for Movie World England were cancelled later that year with no large announcement.

== Shanghai Expo ==
In 2008, after working as a private consultant for the last decade, Winslow was brought on to lead a team to work on the USA Pavilion for the Shanghai Expo. Part of his job consisted of trying to get private companies to sponsor the US Pavilion, since a federal tax cut bill a decade prior prohibited the federal funding of a pavilion. Winslow and his team struggled to find enough sponsors to float the cost of construction, bringing the United States involvement into question. Secretary of state Hillary Clinton urged American support for the pavilion, and stated that, "The U.S. presence at the Expo will showcase American business, culture and values in China's most dynamic city and foster an even stronger friendship between the American and Chinese peoples."

"There is a sense in the U.S. that Americans got disenchanted with [World's Fairs]," said Winslow when asked about the difficulty of finding sponsors. Despite the initial obstacles, with the added help of Clinton's fundraising expertise enough sponsors were found to fully fund the US Pavilion at the Expo.
