= Buckskin Joe, Colorado =

Buckskin Joe, Colorado may refer to:

- Buckskin Joe, Fremont County, Colorado
- Buckskin Joe, Park County, Colorado

== See also ==
- Buckskin Joe
