= Pleasure Island (Massachusetts amusement park) =

Massachusetts amusement park

Coordinates: 42°31′12.71″N 71°2′43.05″W

- Interactive map of Pleasure Island
- Location: Wakefield, Massachusetts, United States
- Status: Defunct
- Opened: 1959
- Closed: 1969
- Slogan: The Disneyland of the Northeast

Attractions
- Total: 48

Pleasure Island was an amusement park located in Wakefield, Massachusetts. The park, billed as the "Disneyland of the Northeast", was in business from 1959 to 1969. During its short existence it went through several owners and was financially handicapped by New England's relatively short summers.

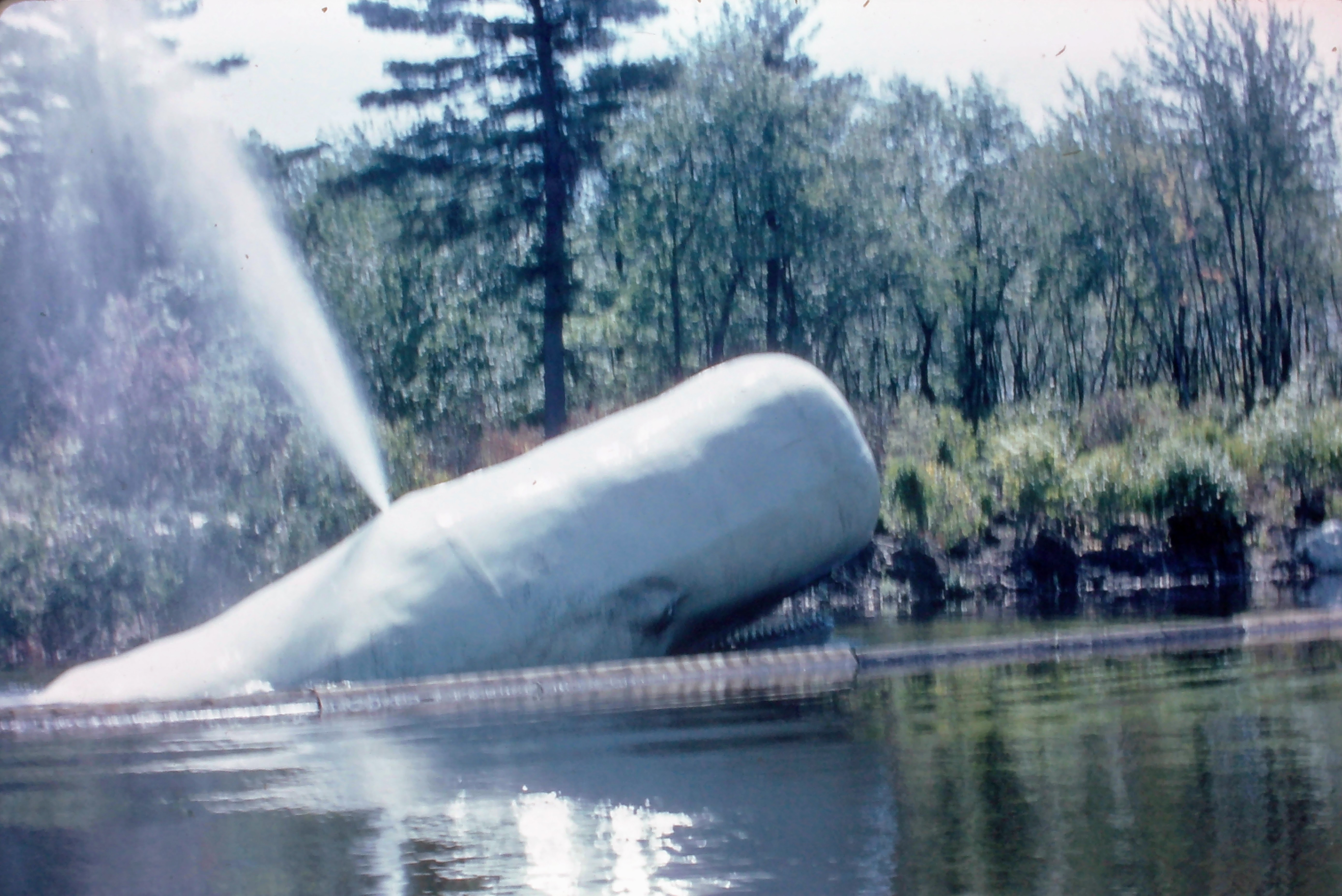
The Moby Dick whale animatronic as part of the Moby Dick Ride

== History ==
Pleasure Island was founded by William Hawkes, publisher of Child Life magazine, and designed by Cornelius Vanderbilt Wood, a designer of Disneyland and Lake Havasu City.

Covering 80 acres (320,000 m^{2}), the park featured a plethora of rides and other attractions, including the Space Rocket ride, the Pirate Ride, the Moby-Dick Hunt ride (which featured a spouting mechanical whale rising from the depths), the Wreck of the Hesperus (dark ride), the Old Chisholm Trail (dark ride), theme restaurants, a shopping area, an arcade, mini-golf (from 1967), a carousel, Monkey Island, and many others.

Actors would stage mock gunfights in the Western City or threaten to attack riders on the boat rides. The park's Old Smokey Railroad Line was a 2 ft (610 mm) narrow gauge railroad using equipment leased from the Edaville Railroad.

Another park feature was the Show Bowl, where performers such as Ricky Nelson, Michael Landon, The Modernaires, the Three Stooges, Clayton Moore, Don Ameche, and Cesar Romero appeared.

Product placement and branding played a part in some attractions, such as the Grist Mill which featured Pepperidge Farm products and the Pepsi-Cola Diamond Lil Theater. Its cartoon character mascot for a time was Popeye.

Today, the land formerly occupied by the park is now Edgewater Office Park. The pond used for the Moby Dick ride is part of the property, with remnants of the ride noticeable on the edge of the pond. The #5 steam locomotive that used to serve at Pleasure Island is still up and running today and can be found at the Wiscasset, Waterville and Farmington Railway Museum, located in Alna, Maine. It has been rechristened the #10.

As of December 10, 2022, the Moby Dick animatronic was confirmed to still be in the pond. The whale has sunken into its tracks but is otherwise in decent condition.

== Attractions ==
- Animal Land
- Barn & Slide
- Burro Trail
- Camera Shop
- Carousel
- Chisolm Trail
- Chowder House
- Christmas Wonderland
- Country Store
- Covered Wagon
- Dagett Chocolate Company's "Handspun" Shop
- Engine City
- Friend's Baked Beanery
- Front Gate
- Goldpan Gulch & Gold Panning Operation
- Golf (18 hole mini-golf installed 1967)
- Helicopter Ride
- Heritage Museum
- Hood's Gay Nineties Ice Cream Parlor
- Horseless Carriage Ride originally "Jenney"
- Indian Village
- Kartland
- Lighthouse
- MagicLand: Crooked House - Slanted Shanty - Magnetic House - Captain's House
- Moby Dick Hunt
- Merchants National Bank
- Monkey Island
- Pavilion
- Pepperidge Farm Bakery
- Picnic Area
- Kaptain Kidd's Pirate Cove
- Pirate Ride
- Quannapowitt Publishers Print Shop
- Old Smokey Railroad Line
- Railroad Station (former Greenwood Depot)
- Roundabout
- Saloon, originally Pepsi-Cola's Diamond Lil Show
- Shooting Gallery
- Shopping Lane
- Showbowl
- Space Rocket
- Stagecoach Ride
- Swift and Company's great meat market
- Treasure Digging Island
- United Nations Theatre
- Water Buffalo Land & Sea Ride
- Western City
- Wreck of the Hesperus

== Pop culture ==
Certain scenes from the film Charly were filmed at Pleasure Island.

The ride "Wreck of the Hesperus" followed the theme from the poem The Wreck of the Hesperus written by American poet Henry Wadsworth Longfellow.

Massachusetts Route 128 continues to have signs for “Pleasure Island Road” near the Salem Street exit, despite the fact that this road no longer exists (aside for a very short portion directly north of Salem Street). MassDOT continues to have the signs as a nod to the park’s short-lived local significance.

== See also ==
- List of amusement parks in New England
- List of defunct amusement parks
- Amusement ride
