= Olinka Hrdy =

American designer and muralist

- Born: Olive Marie "Olinka" Beneš Hrdy; August 7, 1902; Prague, Oklahoma Territory, US
- Died: September 18, 1987 (aged 85); Prague, Oklahoma, US
- Occupation: Artist
- Known for: Murals

Olinka Hrdy (1902–1987) was an American artist who was born in Prague, Oklahoma Territory, and became a noted artist in Oklahoma. She graduated in 1928, from the University of Oklahoma (OU), where she majored in art. Her teachers included Oscar Jacobsen and Edith Mahier, who considered her one of their most gifted students. She earned part of the money for her education by painting murals for a restaurant in Norman, Oklahoma, and a set of panels in the women's dormitory at OU.

Noted Oklahoma-born architect Bruce Goff discovered Hrdy's artistic talent one day while eating lunch at the OU women's dormitory and asked to meet the artist. They became friends and quickly began to collaborate, as he invited her to paint some murals for the Riverside Studio in Tulsa, which he was designing for a Tulsa musician. After that, he commissioned her to help decorate the Brady Theater in Tulsa (then known as the Tulsa Convention Hall). Her works at both sites have since disappeared.

Hrdy moved for a while in the 1930s to New York City, where she applied her artistic talent in designing utilitarian objects like place mats, textiles, radios, wallpaper and even scarves. She was then invited to attend Frank Lloyd Wright's Taliesen Studio in Wisconsin, but ended her visit there after three months.

She moved to Southern California and worked for a while at the start of World War II, but quit her job and opened her own design studio. During this period, she also experienced a brief marriage that apparently ended in divorce. Later, she returned to live in her mother's home in Prague, where she died in 1987.

== Early life and education ==
Olinka Hrdy was born August 7, 1902, in a one-room sod hut in Prague, Oklahoma to Josef Hrdy, an immigrant from Bohemia, and his wife, Emma, who was of Indian descent. (Note: Olinka, more usually a domestic form of "Olga", here apparently a form of her birth name "Olive" .) She had two brothers: Carl, who was older and George, who was younger. Edvard Beneš, the second president of Czechoslovakia, was her second cousin. Her parents divorced when she was about sixteen, and she had no contact with her father after she left home for college.

When Olinka Hrdy enrolled in the University of Oklahoma in 1923, she initially declared her major as domestic arts. She had become proficient in embroidery, which was traditionally practiced by Czech women in her home town. She saw this as a path to learning sewing. She learned instead that domestic arts was boring and switched her major to art at the end of her first semester. Hrdy said that she had only fifty dollars when she arrived at OU. An instructor, Edith Mayer, (Note: Author Lee spelled her name Mahler in his book, while biographer Wall spelled it Mayer in her article. Berry spelled it Mahier in her biography of Hrdy.) saw examples of her work and invited her to paint a mural in one of the School of Creative Design offices. This mural was an illustration of a poem titled, “Maker of Dreams.” Other faculty members who saw Hrdy's work were also impressed, and she was commissioned to create a series of 20 panels for the doors separating two dining rooms in the Women's Dormitory. She titled the work, "Pageant of Foods." Newspapers in Tulsa and Oklahoma City picked up the story, publishing complimentary articles about her work, her talent, and how she had exchanged her art for tuition and board at the University. Olinka graduated from OU in 1928 with honors and won the Leteizer Gold Medal for Art as well.

== Professional career ==
=== Oklahoma ===
In 1928, Hrdy was commissioned to paint two murals in the Central High School of Oklahoma City. This building became surplus to the school district during the 1970s, and was bought in 1981 by Southwestern Bell Telephone Company, who used it for regional offices. Farmers' Union Mutual Insurance Company bought it in 2005. In 2016, the building was vacant and up for sale. The building is now occupied by the Oklahoma City University College of Law. The two murals painted by Olinka Hrdy in 1928 have been found and restored, and now hang in the school's museum on the third floor of the building.

During Hrdy's senior year, noted Tulsa architect, Bruce Goff, attended a luncheon at the Women's Dormitory dining room, where he noticed Hrdy's painted panels. Fascinated, he requested an opportunity to meet the artist. At the meeting, he proposed that Hrdy come to Tulsa to create some murals for his current project, the Riverside Studio. (Note: Goff had been hired by piano teacher Patti Adams Shriner, to design a building that would colocate her living quarters with her teaching studio.) Hrdy agreed to do the studio after her graduation, and moved to Tulsa in the fall of 1928. The two artists' work was complementary. According to Eric Lee, Goff had designed the building as an artistic representation of music, and Hrdy's paintings were an abstract visualization of music.

After completing work on the Riverside Studio, Goff invited Hrdy to collaborate on a project he had been awarded to redesign the interior of Tulsa's Brady Theater, (then known as Convention Hall). Hrdy created a 50 foot (15 m) long asbestos fire curtain for the stage and a mural for the entrance. (Note: Both of these works had been removed and lost by the time an application for NRHP registration of the theater was made in 1979.) According to the biography by Wall, these two works, "solidified Hrdy's understanding of abstraction and her position as a modern artist."

=== New York ===
Hrdy decided to expand her exposure to the art world by moving to New York City, where she lived between 1931 and 1933. She branched out into graphic design, bringing her creativity to utilitarian objects. For example, she did a series of flatware, place mats, textiles, radios, wallpaper and even scarves.

=== Wisconsin ===
After New York, Hrdy was invited to visit at Frank Lloyd Wright's studio at Taliesin. She remained only three months, apparently working with Wright on some projects and teaching some of his students. Her departure seemed abrupt and was never explained. Gail Kana Anderson, interim director for the Fred Jones Jr. Museum of Art, said in a 2007 interview, "..."there is a letter in the archives expressing some kind of regret about how her stay ended." Anderson also indicated that Hrdy had come to Taliesin.

=== California ===
During the 1930s, Hrdy moved to Southern California, where she married Ray Clair Tracy. During World War II, both Olinka and Tracy worked at Douglas Aircraft Company's Los Angeles plant. Soon she realized that the devices she was assembling were intended for killing people, and immediately quit her job. Hrdy and Tracy divorced. (Note: Little has been published about Hrdy's marriage to Tracy, except that it was brief - Ed.) She then opened her own design studio in Hollywood.

An article from the July 1948 issue of Sooner Magazine reported:

"Olinka Hrdy Tracy, '28fa, the Oklahoma-born Czechoslovakian girl, has returned to the state to visit after an absence of 14 years. While in school at O.U., Mrs.Tracy painted murals on the walls of the Copper Kettle and in the girls' dormitories. For the past 14 years she has done industrial designing in Los Angeles. For several years before WorldWar II, she was chief designer for the state of California and has worked on many of the newer public buildings, painting murals and designing stage curtains."

== Death ==
Olinka Hrdy returned to her hometown (Prague, Oklahoma) sometime before her death, and lived in a house that belonged to her mother, but exactly when is not known. Author Berry says that she suffered from crippling arthritis in her later years. She died on September 8, 1987. She is buried in the same plot with her mother, Edna Mae (who died April 16, 1987) and her younger brother, George E. (who died March 31, 1988).

Other family members buried in the same cemetery (but not in the same plot) are:

- Carl Hrdy, older brother of Olinka (February 23, 1901 – September 2, 1956)
- Edna Mae Lester Hrdy, sister of Olinka (September 23, 1909 – April 16, 1987)
- Josef Hrdy, father of Olinka (December 29, 1867 – August 5, 1953)

== Legacy ==
Most of the major works of Olinka Hrdy's early years have disappeared. The Fred Jones, Jr. Museum of Art in Norman owns the majority of her surviving pieces. The museum presented Oklahoma Moderne: The Art and Design of Olinka Hrdy June 9 to September 9, 2007.

The murals she completed at the Oklahoma Central High School have been found and restored. They are still in the same building, which now belongs to the Oklahoma City University College of Law.
