= The Drunkard =

19th century American temperance play

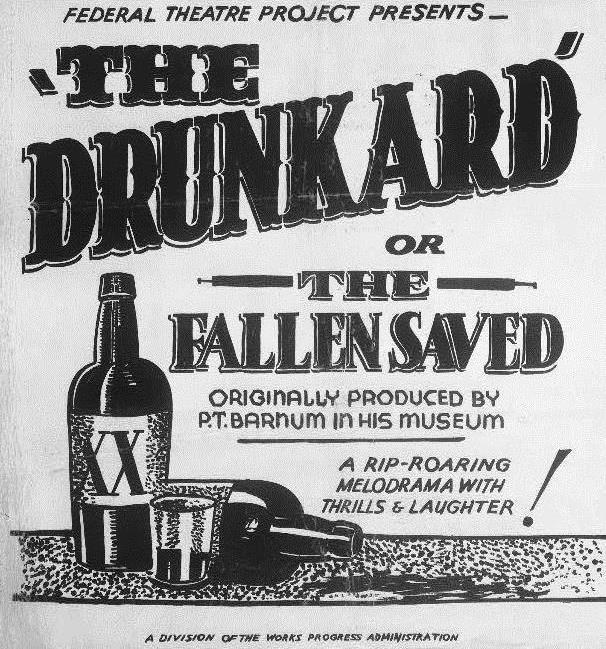
Poster for a 1938 production by the Federal Theatre Project

The Drunkard; or, The Fallen Saved is an American temperance play first performed on February 12, 1844. A drama in five acts, it was perhaps the most popular play produced in the United States until the dramatization of Uncle Tom's Cabin premiered in 1853.

By 1933 the play's theme and theatrics had become antiquated, lending the show to parody: the florid dialogue would be delivered as written, but exaggerated deliberately for comic effect. The Drunkard enjoyed new popularity as a comedy in live performances and on screen, and especially as a record-breaking stage revival (1933-1959).

== The original play ==
In New York City, P.T. Barnum presented it at his American Museum in a run of over 100 performances. It was among the first of the American temperance plays, and remained the most popular of them until it was eclipsed in 1858 by T. S. Arthur's Ten Nights in a Bar-Room.

The primary writer of the play was William Henry Smith (1806–1872), who also directed and starred in the original production in Boston in the 1844–45 season. Smith was the stage manager at Moses Kimball's Boston Museum, where the play was originally produced. An anonymous collaborator (credited as "A Gentleman") co-wrote the script. A commonly held theory identifies Unitarian minister John Pierpont as the unnamed collaborator. Pierpont's motive to remain anonymous may have been rooted in the desire to avoid affiliation with the theatre, which was considered a taboo subject in the Christian community.

The play ran for an unprecedented 140 performances in the Boston Museum's 1844–45 season, sometimes running three times a day. This was astonishing at the time. The success of the play led to the beginning of the temperance movement's success. The Drunkard "was presented in the 'large room' of the City Hotel in Brooklyn instead of the regular weekly lecture on temperance. Then, in 1850, it had its first Manhattan run at the then National Theatre," reported a historian in Variety. "Thereafter, The Drunkard joined Uncle Tom's Cabin as a standard in America's storehouse and remained so until the turn of the century. Hypocrisies of Prohibition made it a natural for revival at the McDougal St. Playhouse on Dec. 30, 1929."

== The long-running revival ==
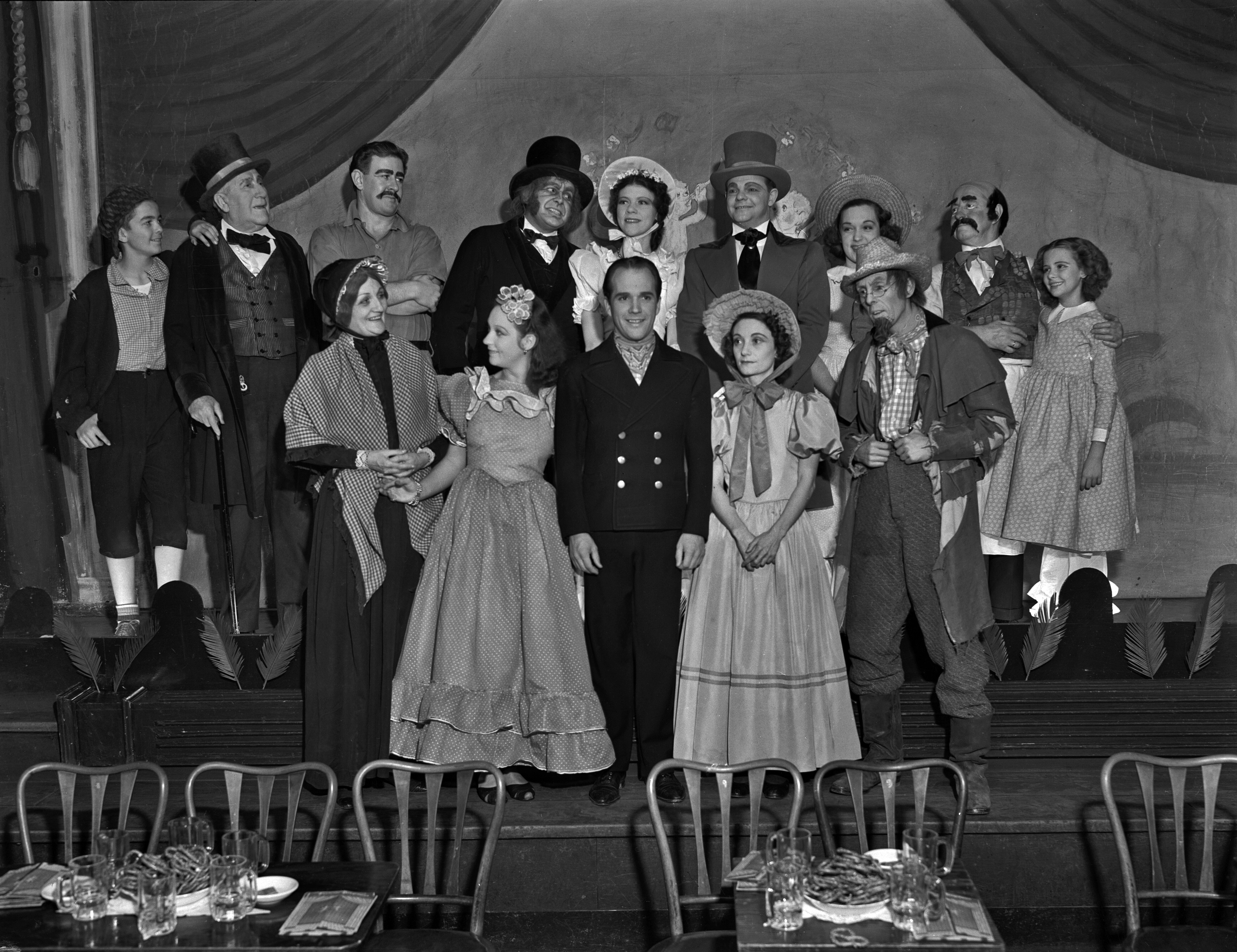
Cast of The Drunkard, 1938

Little-theater producer Galt Bell mounted a revival of The Drunkard at the Theatre Mart in Los Angeles. The show opened on July 6, 1933, and was an immediate success. Bell presented The Drunkard as an audience-participation show, with the audience supplied with free sandwiches and beer—themselves an attraction during the Depression—and urged to hiss the villain and cheer the hero. Bell's festive approach ensured steady audiences and repeat customers. "Tuesday evening we witnessed the 439th performance of The Drunkard at the Theatre Mart. What a record, and what a show!", enthused the trade publisher Harry Burns. Mildred Ilse of the production team (who later took over from Galt Bell as producer) noted that the audience was reluctant to go home after the curtain rang down, so musical and vaudeville acts were added as an olio to conclude each evening. "Jan Duggan's song 'Gathering Up the Shells from the Seashore' is still one of the highlights of the olio which follows the performance of The Drunkard," reported the Los Angeles Times. "It is one of Hollywood's favorite tunes."

The play became a popular venue for movie people. "When a customer has made five visits to The Drunkard he receives a gold star. Lyle Talbot, W. C. Fields, John Barrymore, Mae West, Lewis Stone, and Gloria Swanson are proud owners of the stars," reported Picture Play. Jan Duggan said in the same report, "If our audience doesn't hiss and shout and pound tables with its beer mugs, our performance inevitably begins to sag. Our best audiences are picture or stage people. Claudette Colbert came for the first time the other evening. The entire cast concentrated on her, trying to make her laugh. When she did, our evening was a success!"

W. C. Fields loved the show and wanted to make a film version. He arranged for Paramount Pictures to hire members of the Los Angeles stage company: Jan Duggan, Ruth Marion, Samuel Ethridge, Larry Grenier, and William Blatchford. The villain of The Drunkard, actor Henry Kleinbach, was also signed; Fields kept Kleinbach on hand during the filming. Fields would be appearing in the Drunkard part of the film, but hadn't decided which role he would take. Fields finally took Kleinbach's role of Squire Cribbs in the film version, The Old Fashioned Way (1934). Fields especially enjoyed working with Jan Duggan as a comedy foil; her "Seashore" song was featured in The Old Fashioned Way and she appeared in five of his films, as well as dozens of other features and shorts. Henry Kleinbach enjoyed a long career as a movie character actor (as Henry Brandon), as did Samuel Ethridge (as Sam Flint).

The advance buzz surrounding the production of The Old Fashioned Way prompted a revival of the original play in New York. It ran for 277 performances at the American Music Hall, through November 1934.

In 1935, James Murray and Clara Kimball Young starred in a low-budget feature, The Drunkard; the play is presented as part of the film's plot, in which two theatrical producers cast their needy relatives in the show. Murray's casting in The Drunkard was ironic, because his promising screen career as a leading man had plummeted with his own addiction to alcohol. The film was produced by Louis Weiss's Stage and Screen Productions. According to archivist Kit Parker, who now owns the Weiss library, Weiss intended to offer the feature as a roadshow attraction, with the actors making personal appearances in theaters across America. The ambitious plan was foiled by economics and logistics, and the film went out through ordinary, independent distribution channels. The feature film exists in condensed form, as a two-reel segment in Joseph E. Levine's nostalgic anthology feature Gaslight Follies (1945); the full-length version of The Drunkard is no longer available because Weiss sold it outright to Levine, so it is no longer in the Weiss library.

In 1940 Alan Mowbray, Richard Cromwell, Anita Louise, and Buster Keaton starred in another film parody, The Villain Still Pursued Her, with Billy Gilbert in a spoken prologue, urging the movie audience to hiss the villain and cheer the hero in the tradition of the stage revival.

Meanwhile The Drunkard continued its long and prosperous stage presentation. As of 1945 "Drunkard still has the original producer and four members of the original cast, including Jan Duggan", wrote Frank Scully in Variety. "Practically everybody who is anybody (and in Hollywood, who isn't?) has seen the show. Efforts to put on versions of The Drunkard elsewhere have met only with mild success. But The Drunkard still enjoys the longest run in America."

In 1953 the show had been running for 20 years and 7,572 performances, when producer Mildred Ilse reformatted it as a musical with the title changed to The Wayward Way ("without missing a performance", commented Variety). The revised version opened on September 3, 1953, with 12 new songs by the team of Lorne Huycke and Bill Howe. The new musical treatment was a refreshing change: "It is an innovation that will catch on with the tourist trade," wrote syndicated columnist Hubbard Keavy. "About half of the audience will consist of out-of-towners who rate The Drunkard as a must-see like Catalina, the Farmer's Market, and any movie star, and the other half of residents like me who've seen it from 10 to 25 times. We regulars take a proprietary interest in the performance." Hollywood columnist Bob Thomas raved about the new musical: "It is terrific entertainment, as good as many Broadway shows." The Hollywood Reporter agreed: "Jan Duggan's entr'acte trilling is thrilling."

But the show was so familiar and popular as The Drunkard that both shows ran concurrently, with The Wayward Way presented every night except Thursday, and The Drunkard reserved for Thursdays only. Columnist Keavy even commented on The Drunkard's biggest fan: "Seymour Hess, an extrovert whose business is reviving ailing business firms, was there for the 7,816th performance and his 183rd. After Hess paid his way into 150 performances, producer Mildred Ilse gave him a gold lifetime pass. Now he gets in for free, but always takes guests. Last night he got in for free but bought 48 tickets for his guests." True to Keavy's prediction, The Drunkard was indeed listed as a popular tourist attraction among other California landmarks like Disneyland and Knott's Berry Farm.

At the show's 26th-anniversary performance on July 8, 1959, producer Mildred Ilse announced to the audience that The Drunkard would be closing in three months. She and her husband would be retiring to a ranch in Texas. Brad Williams of the Los Angeles Times was there: "The announcement that the end was in sight was first greeted with stunned silence, some of the most avid fans began to weep. Cries of 'No! No!' rang throughout the theater. Probably for the first time in the history of the 26-year performance, the audience left the theater sadly." Ilse explained to Times reporter Bud Lembke: "When the fire department decreed that we'd have to reduce our seating from 340 to 260, it just wasn't worthwhile to continue." On October 17, 1959, after 9,477 performances—with Jan Duggan in most of them and comedian Neely Edwards in almost all of them since 1933 -- The Drunkard rang down its final curtain with a champagne toast and a cheering audience, concluding an outstanding run.

== Other stage adaptations ==
The Goldenrod, "the last of the Mississippi showboats", was still presenting old stock-company perennials for its passengers' entertainment. The Drunkard was dusted off in 1945, with juvenile performer Kathy Nolan in the role of little Mary Wilson. Nolan was already a stage veteran, and appeared in Goldenrod shows for 12 years.

Another version of the play, adapted by Richard Mansfield Dickinson, has been performed every Saturday night since November 14, 1953, at the Spotlight Theatre in Tulsa, Oklahoma; the company touts this as the longest-running stage production in America. (For comparison, The Mousetrap has been running in the West End since 1952.) The show's longevity earned the Tulsa Spotlight Theatre recognition on the U.S. National Register of Historic Places in 2001. A musical adaptation of the play by the British writer Brian J. Burton, The Drunkard or Down With the Demon Drink, was published in 1968 and has been performed several times since.

The Drunkard returned to Broadway in July 1959—while the show was still running in Los Angeles—with new songs by on-stage pianist Robert Proctor and lyricist Caroline Kellogg. A 1961 revival in Kansas City was presented at the intimate Bandbox Theatre, which accommodated 125 patrons.

An off-Broadway run of the play was produced at the Metropolitan Playhouse in New York City in 2010.

== The Drunkard Song ==
The 1933 revival of the play featured an old song about a maiden's lost love. When the play became an instant hit, the song caught on and became known as The Drunkard Song. It was recorded under this title by Rudy Vallee; his first attempt failed when one of the band members made a rude "raspberry" noise. Vallee broke down and laughed uncontrollably during the last part of the song. The orchestra went along with him anyway and finished the tune, with everyone certain that the take wouldn't be released. Vallee then recorded the song more soberly. Edward (Ted) Wallerstein, president of Okeh Records, sent Vallee a test pressing of the "laughing" take, accompanied by a note: "What do you say we let the public have this one? The 'slip-up' makes the record much funnier." Vallee agreed, and Okeh pressed a "plain white label" version of The Drunkard Song with facsimiles of Wallerstein's and Vallee's handwriting across the label. Radio stations and record shops, especially in college towns, snapped it up and it became an underground hit.

The song ran into legal trouble when it was revived, because 15 different publishers assumed it was in the public domain. Variety commented that "the publishing trade, stirred to action by the revival of an old tune over the air, flocks to run it off the press without first finding out if the song is protected by copyright." Only one of the 15 publishers, M. M. Cole of Chicago, bothered to check, and found that the song was composed in May 1883 by William Hills, and that Hills had renewed his copyright in March 1911. Cole bought the publishing rights from the composer's widow, but neglected to secure the "performance and mechanical rights" (encompassing live performances, radio, and recordings). A second publisher, Louis Bernstein, bought those rights, and made a deal with Cole for Bernstein to become the publisher of record. The song was now officially known by a new title, taken from the lyrics: There Is a Tavern in the Town.

W. C. Fields adopted the song as his informal theme when he appeared on network radio in the 1930s and 1940s.

== Plot ==
Act 1 opens on a lovely rural cottage occupied by the tenants Mrs. Wilson and her daughter Mary. They are terrified of losing the cottage because they are unable to make regular payments and they are speaking to Lawyer Cribbs who insists they will because the new landlord, Edward Middleton, is not as generous as his father was. Cribbs is lying to them because he is managing the estate of Edward's late father and has an opportunity to sell the cottage and land for quite a healthy sum. However, when Edward meets Mary he falls in love with her and they get married. Also in act 1 there is a scene between Edward's foster brother William and Miss Spindle who is in love with Edward.

Act 2 begins with a furious Cribbs trying to get revenge on Edward for thwarting his sale by testing the jealous Miss Spindle to see if she might have a case against Edward. Upon discovering she has nothing of substance he switches tactics and decides that since Edward has been known to drink some in the past, perhaps he can be made to drink too much. Edward and Mary have a daughter now, young Julia, but that doesn't stop Cribbs. He convinces Edward to drink too much brandy at the local tavern and then spreads the rumor that Edward has fallen and is a no-good drunk. On the night that Edward first returns to the cottage drunk, Mrs. Wilson is found dead and Edward blames himself. He flees the cottage and runs to Boston (New York in later scripts).

Act 3 Starts with Cribbs finding Edward in the city to gloat and enact another money making scheme. Cribbs wants the fallen Edward to forge the name of one Arden Rencelaw, a wealthy philanthropist, in exchange for money to fuel his drinking habits. Showing goodness still, Edward refuses, but goes off to continue drinking in the city. In desperate search for William, Mary and Julia have also gone to the city. They are starving and cold when Cribbs stumbles upon them and tries to have his way with Mary. Luckily, William shows up at the perfect time to stop the assault, and then he swears to help find his foster brother.

William finds Edward at the top of Act 4 and along with Arden Rencelaw's help he convinces Edward to return to his family and stop wallowing in self pity. There is a happy family reunion for the Middletons. Before this happens, though, another complication arises as it is discovered that Cribbs forged Mr. Rencelaw's signature himself and is skipping town with $5,000 of his money.

Act 5 begins with a return to the village as Cribbs attempts to gather up incriminating evidence before making his escape. The real will of Edward's father which does not name Cribbs as the caretaker of the estate is hidden back at the cottage. The Middletons, Mr. Rencelaw, and William have figured this out, however, and they head him off at the cottage with the will in their possession. Lawyer Cribbs is promptly arrested. The final scene of the play is a picturesque, dialogue free scene in the interior of the cottage with everyone gathered around as a big happy family.

== Characters and 1844 cast ==
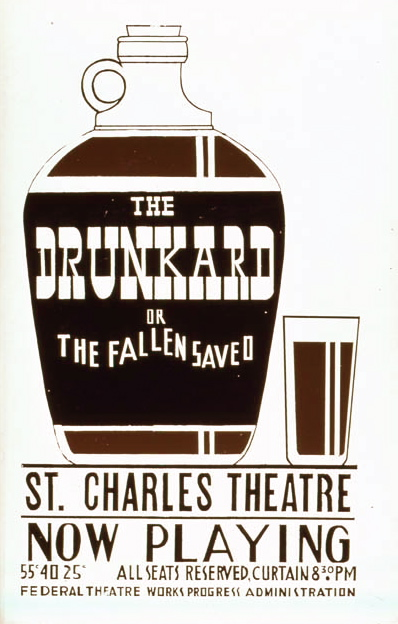
Another poster for the Federal Theatre Project production

- Edward Middleton played by Mr. W. H. Smith
- Lawyer Cribbs played by Mr. G. H. Wyatt
- William Dowton played by Mr. C. W. Hunt
- Farmer Gates played by Mr. C. H. Saunders
- Farmer Stevens played by Mr. G. Howard
- Old Johnson played by Mr. G. E. Locke
- Sam played by Mr. S. Adams
- First Loafer played by Mr. J. Adams
- Second Loafer played by Mr. Thompson
- Mr. Rencelaw played by Mr. G. C. Germon
- Landlord played by Mr. Harris
- Bar Keeper played by Mr. Willard
- Watchman played by Mr. Coad
- Mary Wilson played by Mrs. G. C. Germon
- Agnes Dowton, a Maniac played by Mrs. Thoman
- Mrs. Wilson played by Mrs. Woodward
- Patience played by Mrs. C. W. Hunt
- Julia played by Miss A. Phillips
- Villagers, Loafers, Watchmen, &c.

== See also ==
- American Temperance Society
- Boston Museum
- Federal Theatre Project
- Olio (musical number)
- P. T. Barnum
- Riverside Studio
- Temperance movement
