= Riverside Studio =

Historic house in Oklahoma, United States

- U.S. National Register of Historic Places
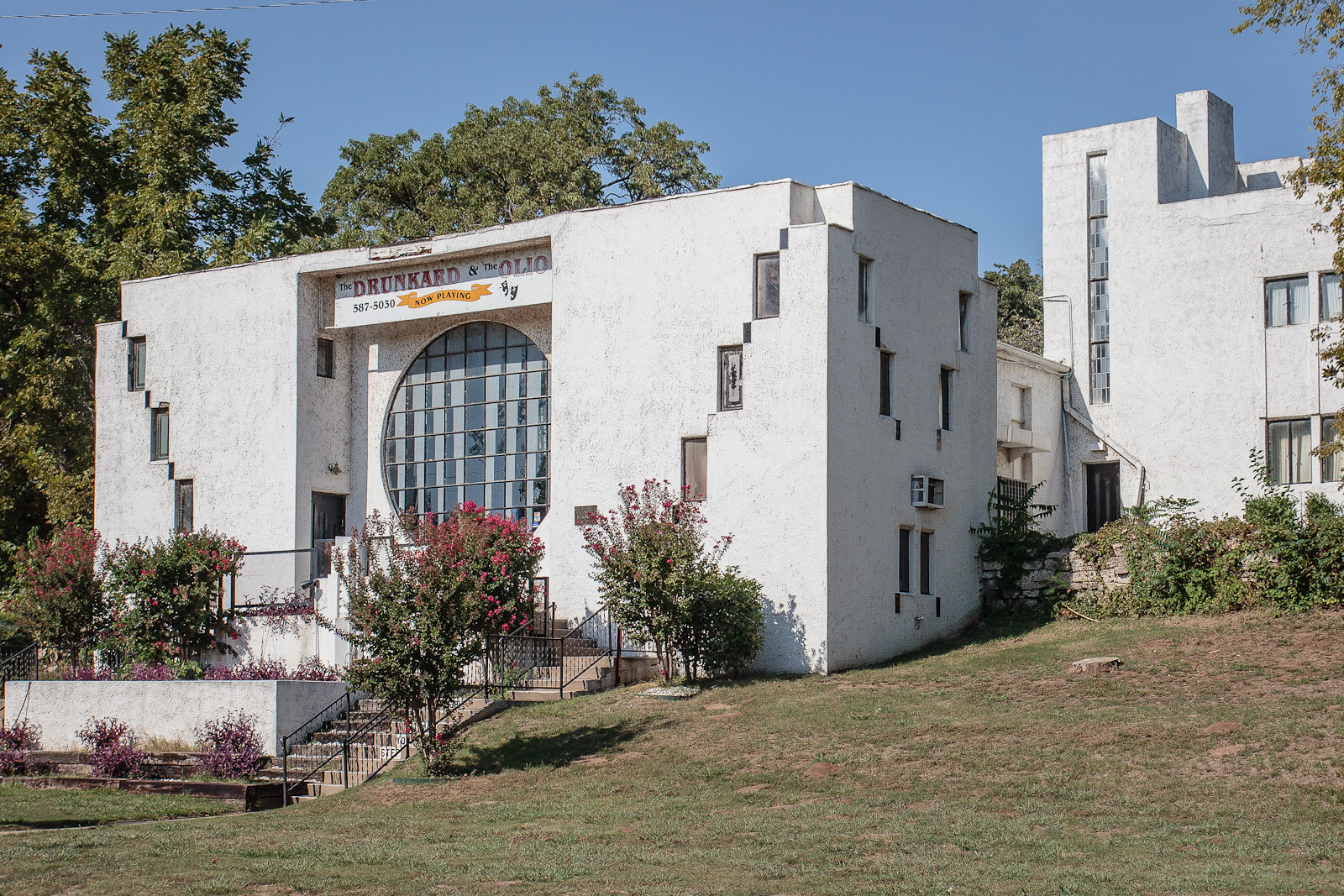

- Location within Oklahoma Location within the United States
- Location: 1381 Riverside Dr., Tulsa, Oklahoma
- Coordinates: 36°6′44″N 95°59′47″W
- Built: 1928
- Architect: Goff, Bruce
- Architectural style: International Style
- Website: www.tulsaspotlighttheater.com
- MPS: Bruce Goff Designed Resources in Oklahoma MPS
- NRHP reference No.: 01000656
- Added to NRHP: June 14, 2001

The Riverside Studio in Tulsa, Oklahoma, United States, also known as Tulsa Spotlight Theater, was built in 1928. It was designed by architect Bruce Goff in International Style. It was built as a house with a studio wing for a music teacher named Patti Adams Shriner. The Riverside Studio was listed on the U.S. National Register of Historic Places in 2001 under Criterion C.

== History ==
=== Piano studio ===
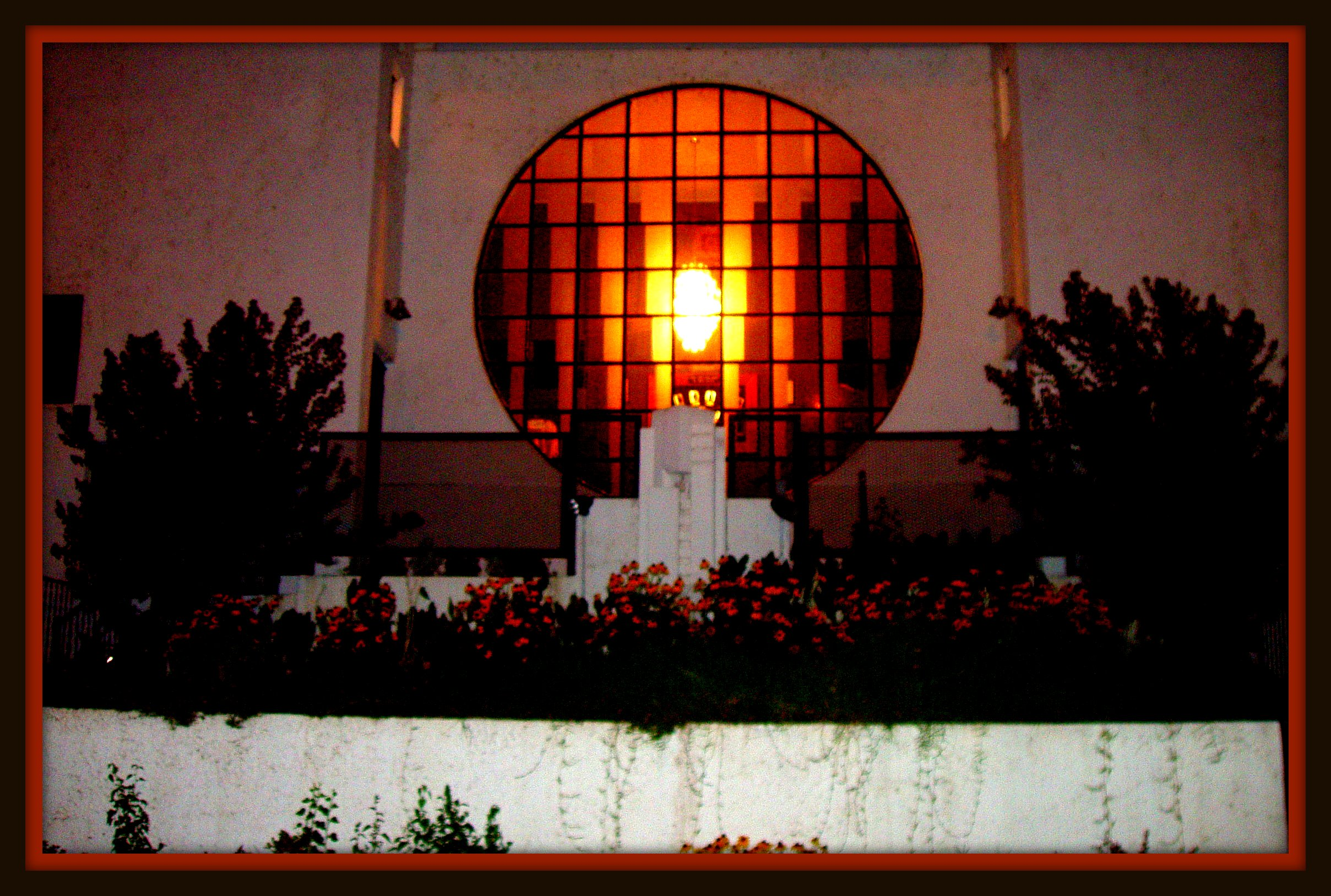
Window with Ianelli Fountain. Spotlight Theatre a.k.a. Riverside Studio, August 2, 2005.

Riverside Studio was adorned with several unique artistic features. These included a large, circular front window, a fountain designed by Italian sculptor, Alfonso Iannelli, black glass and green marble fireplaces, Japanese wall coverings made from wood veneer, and a series of nine murals that Goff commissioned from Oklahoma artist Olinka Hrdy. (Note: The murals later disappeared from the building; their fate has never been established.) Facing bankruptcy during the Great Depression, Ms. Shriner lost ownership of the building in 1933. It went through a series of a series of receivers, and sat vacant until actor Richard Mansfield Dickinson bought it for only $2,500 in 1941.

=== Spotlight Club ===
Since 1953, Dickinson's Tulsa Spotlight Club has used the building to present his adaptation of the 19th-century temperance melodrama The Drunkard. In 2008, Charles Conrad, then board chairman of the Spotlighters, wanted to restore the building to its original condition, plus bring the electrical and mechanical systems up to date. However, the estimated cost for this work was $700,000, far more than the Spotlighters could afford. In 2012, he indicated that the club had repaired the leaky roof, remodeled the bathrooms and converted an upstairs bedroom to a library.

In 2013, actor-director Joe Sears, best known for his co-creation of the Greater Tuna stage trilogy (and for the Tony nomination he received in 1985 for his performance in A Tuna Christmas), took charge as the production's new director. The play has been performed almost every Saturday night for six decades, and the company claims it to be the longest-running stage production in America.

== Building design ==
This building is a two-story structure dug into a hillside facing west across Riverside Drive toward the Arkansas River. Located on an 0.86 acres (3,500 m^{2}) tract, it has a flat roof and stucco exterior. The NRHP application says that the two-story entrance hall is, "... the most prominent feature of the building." Two sets of external stairs lead to a common landing that accesses a foyer. The large, flat, circular window in the front of the foyer is considered a primary decorative feature of the building. Other front windows are stepped and have alternating inserts of black glass to provide a diagonal pattern.

Behind the foyer is an auditorium (recital hall), in which the audience would face eastward toward the stage, in the next wing of the building. The one-story auditorium has three sets of double doors on the north and south sides. The auditorium, as a connecting element between the entrance hall and living quarters, is relatively narrow and this geometric configuration defines partially enclosed patio areas on both north and south elevations of the building. The wing east of the auditorium houses the recital stage. A small service area and kitchen is at the north end of the stage, while a living room, garage, and servant quarters are at the south end. This end of the wing is two stories high, with a small part extending to three stories.

== Subsequent alterations ==
The original living room walls were paneled with wood imported from Japan, the ceiling was decorated with aluminum leaf and the room had a fireplace decorated with green marble and black glass. As mentioned above, there were four murals in the recital hall that had been painted by Olinka Hrdy. These features were no longer present at the time the NRHP application was submitted. The Iannelli-designed fountain had been dismantled. Side doors of the recital hall had been blocked by air-conditioning ducts that had been installed during a later period. The NRHP review committee determined that these changes did not negate the assignment of Category C.

== See also ==
- Olio (musical number)
- The Drunkard
