= Olio (musical number) =

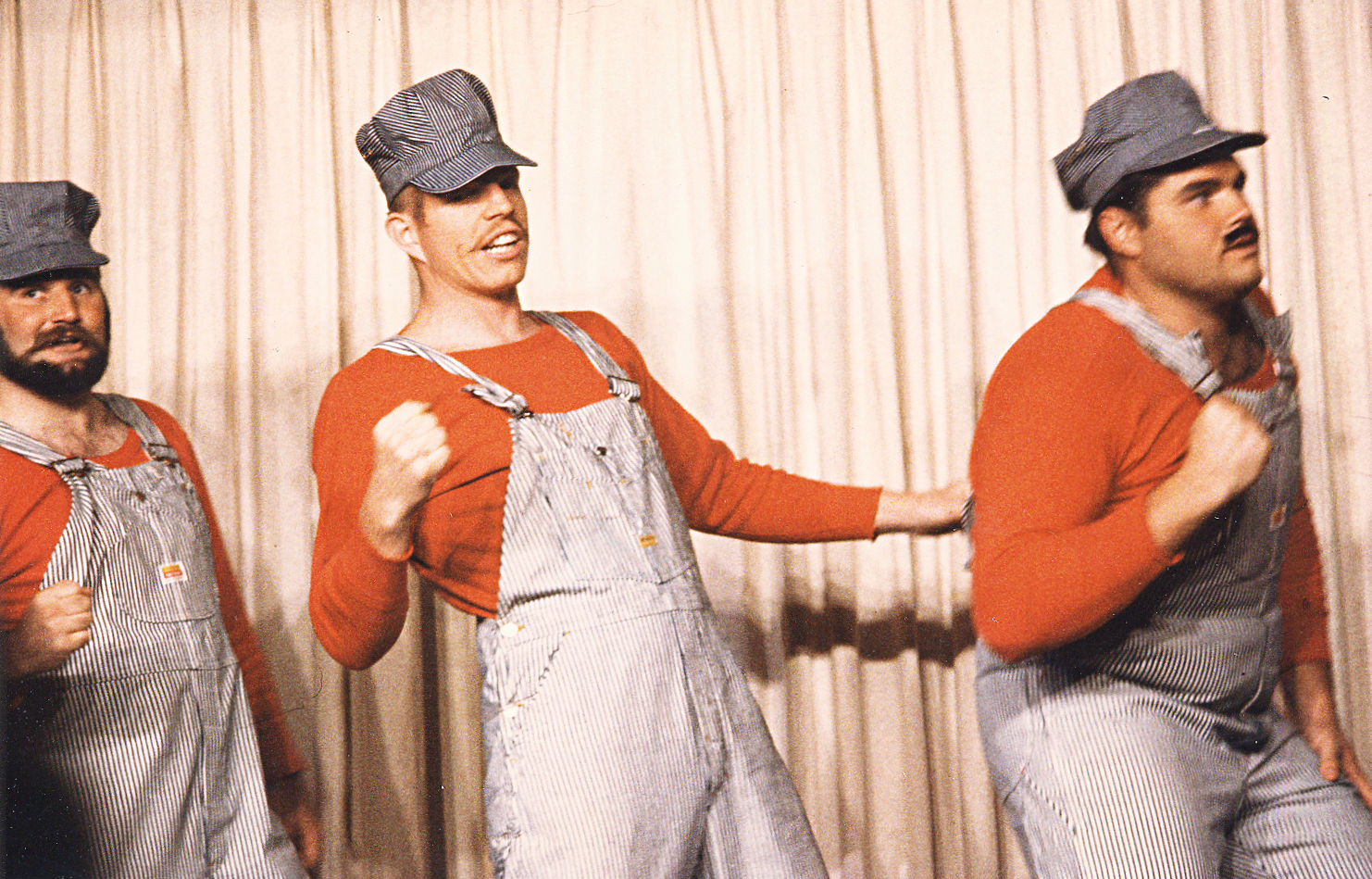
"Alabamy Bound", one of many 'olio' song & dance numbers, early 1960s

An olio is a vaudeville number, a short dance or song, or a set of same, performed as an encore after the performance of a dramatic play. The term can also refer to a set of such performances, or to the curtain used during the set.

== History ==
The term "olio" is believed to derive either from the Spanish olla, originally meaning a clay pot but later used to describe its mix of contents, or from the oilcloth curtains used during the acts.

Olio performances consisted of artistic or literary works or musical pieces, used between acts in a burlesque or minstrel show, similar to the modern variety show. These sometimes included performances by acrobats or magicians. Olios in minstrel shows often contained a parodic stump speech, mocking the oratory of white politicians.

In addition to being widely crowd-pleasing, the olio gave the stage crew time to change sets, as the back of the stage would be hidden behind a dropped curtain. Some burlesque houses would display advertisements on these curtains, similar to a billboard.

Due to their popularity, by the 1860s the olio became the largest component of minstrel shows. The olio was also common on showboats in the 19th and early 20th centuries.

== See also ==
- The Drunkard
- Riverside Studio
- Alabamy Bound
