= The Original Salty Dogs Jazz Band =

Jazz ensemble from the Midwestern United States

The Original Salty Dogs Jazz Band is a traditional jazz ensemble founded in 1947 in West Lafayette, Indiana, and later based in Chicago, Illinois. The Salty Dogs play standards and original pieces influenced by the Dixieland artists of the 1910s and 1920s, as well as the 1940s and 1950s "revivalists" such as Lu Watters and Turk Murphy.

== History ==
A group of Purdue University students created a club in 1947 to discuss, listen to, and (later) perform jazz music. This club became semi-official when the university created the Purdue Jazz Society. The Jazz Society's performance group called themselves "The Original Peerless Jazz Band" at school functions and "The Salty Dogs" at paid performances at local taverns. Some band members moved to Chicago after graduation and continued to perform as a band. By the late 1950s, there were two "Salty Dogs" jazz bands: the one in Chicago and the one on the Purdue campus which was still being replenished by newer students. This occasionally led to misunderstandings, including cases in which, after playing at a venue for a few weeks, the campus band would be fired and replaced by the Chicago band. The Chicago band soon adopted the name "The Original Salty Dogs" in order to minimize such misunderstandings.

During the late 1950s, the campus band made a few limited-edition recordings which sold quickly at bookstores and the student union. (Some of these recordings were re-released on compact disc in the 2000s.) Their first widely distributed album was released in 1963 on Audiophile Records. This group soon disbanded as college students began to favor rock music over jazz.

Meanwhile, other Chicago-area musicians had joined the Purdue graduates and the Original Salty Dogs were regularly performing at The Red Arrow, The Hunt Club, The Sabre Room and other jazz clubs in the city's southwest suburbs. They recorded their first commercial album in 1964 on Delmark Records. The band released more albums on the Delmark, GHB, Jazz & Jazz (Australia) OKOM, Xylophonia and Stomp Off record labels and began to play at festivals throughout the United States. The Original Salty Dogs sometimes performed with The Kingston Trio, George Shearing, The Four Freshmen and other notable artists. Several members moved away from the Chicago area in the early 1970s, making regular performances difficult. Nevertheless, the Original Salty Dogs continue to give occasional performances with many of the same musicians who had joined in the 1950s and 1960s.

Richard "Dick" Karner joined the band in 1953 and played on the Salty Dogs first commercially released recording, a 1954 EP, called The Salty Dog Express. For the next numerous years, he performed with the band on Purdue's campus and at Chicago nightclub venues such as The Blue Note, Hunt Club and the Sabre Room. He died on March 12, 2021.
