= Heritage Square (Golden, Colorado) =

Shopping village at Golden, Colorado

- Previously known as Magic Mountain
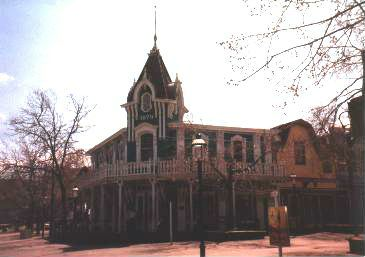
- General Store building (originally Magic Mountain Play House)
- Interactive map of Heritage Square
- Location: 18301 West Colfax Avenue, Golden, Colorado, U.S.
- Coordinates: 39°42′48.67″N 105°12′44.14″W
- Status: Defunct
- Opened: 1959
- Closed: 2018

Heritage Square was a Storybook Victorian theme park shopping village in Golden, Colorado. It was originally built as Magic Mountain in 1957–59. It was built by Marco Engineering, Inc., led by original Disneyland vice president C. V. Wood Jr.. The park officially closed on June 30, 2018.

== History ==
Walter Francis Cobb and John Calvin Sutton incorporated Magic Mountain, Inc. in 1957 for investment to build the new theme park. At first the new theme park targeted as a building site the northeastern alcove of South Table Mountain, just east of Golden, Colorado, and purchased 460 acres (1.9 km^{2}) of land to do so. This site met with sharp opposition from the nearby residents of Applewood, who objected to the impact of the development, including traffic and building on the scenic mountain.

The new site selected for Magic Mountain was 600 acres (2.4 km^{2}) at the foot of the mountains at Apex Gulch southwest of Golden. During the Colorado Gold Rush, this had been part of the site of Apex. Cobb learned of the new theme park firm of Marco Engineering, Inc., formed by Cornelius Vanderbilt Wood, and hired them to design Magic Mountain at this location.

=== Themed areas and attractions ===
In the design dreamed up for Magic Mountain, the park was based on Colorado history, development and future. It was to be surrounded by an authentic narrow gauge train of the type historic to Golden and the Colorado mountains, and the park included 6 themed areas:

- Cavalry Post and Stockade (frontier protection for settlers)
- Centennial City (Old West downtown)
- Fairgrounds (amusement facilities including a Mine Ride and Creation of the Earth Ride)
- Forest River (mountaineers, American Indians and fur traders)
- Magic of Industry (story of industrial progress in the American west including Outer Space Lines ride)
- Storybook Lane (fairy tale land for younger visitors)

Magic Mountain also was to include a ski slope upon Jackson Hill to its west.

=== Construction and demise ===
In 1957–59, the core of Magic Mountain was built, including the Magic Mountain Railroad, Cavalry Post and Stockade, and Centennial City. The Eden Palais a carousel ride, was shipped in. However, financial difficulties began to arise and further plans were changed or scaled back. One building of the Fairgrounds was built, the Forest River Ride area created in altered form, and Storybook Lane and Magic of Industry scrapped altogether. The Magic Mountain ski area was scaled down to a rope tow instead of a ski lift and operated with artificial snow.

After opening to the public in 1959, it encountered continued financial difficulties and ultimately closed in 1960. Developer William Zeckendorf and Cobb unsuccessfully attempted to save the park. Its components were auctioned off, with its rides moving to Six Flags Over Texas while the core complex stood idle for some time.

=== Rebirth as Heritage Square ===
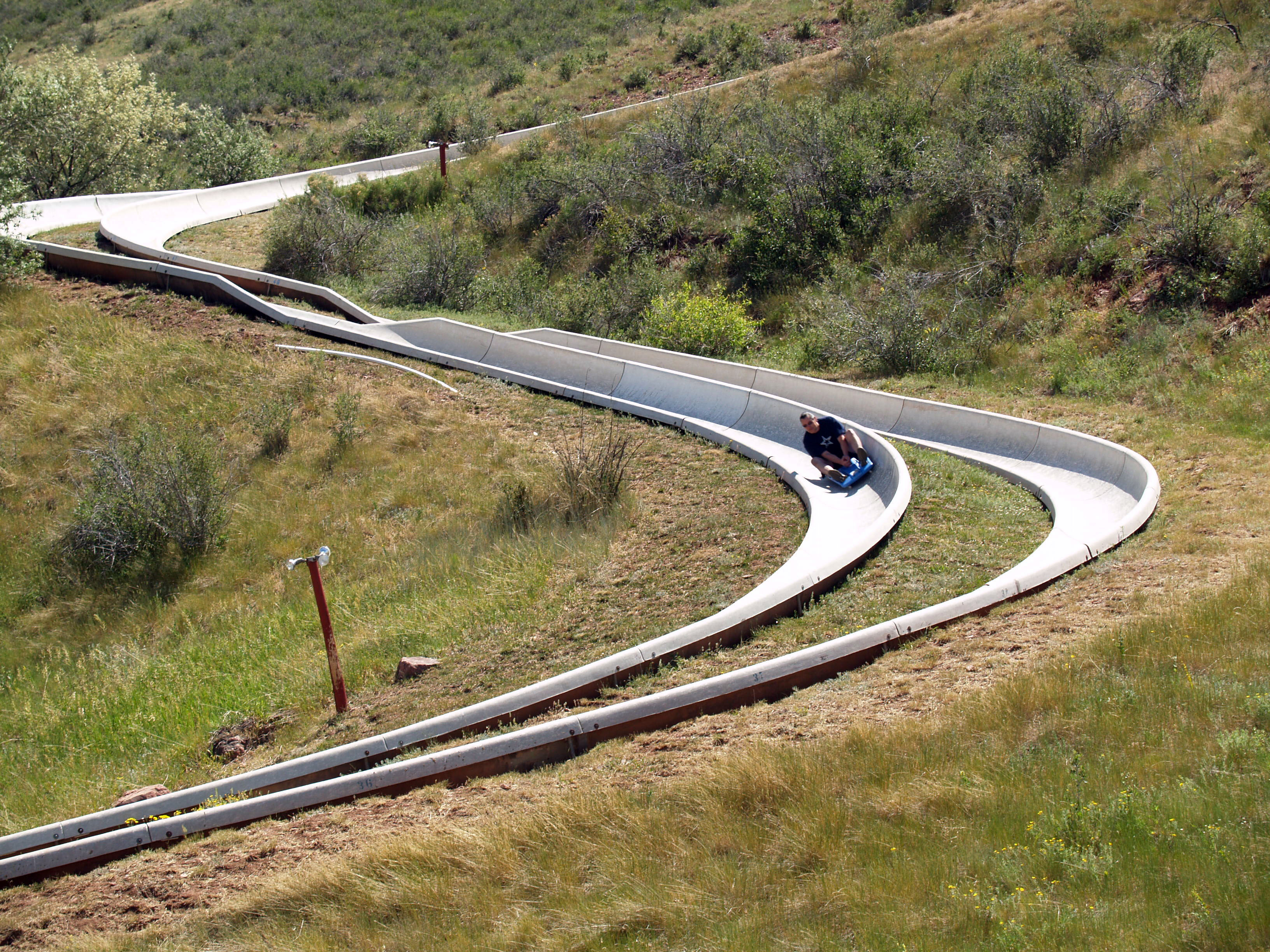
The alpine slide on Jackson Hill.

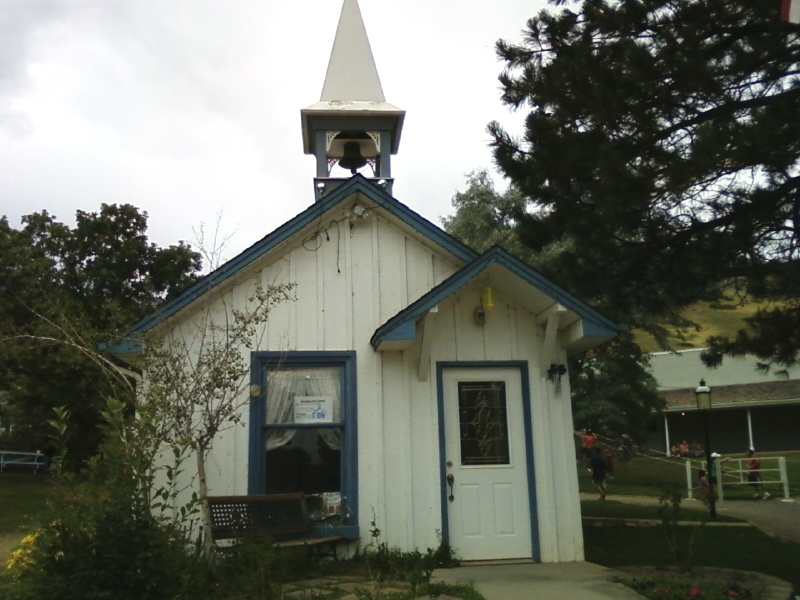
The former schoolhouse, Wedding Bell Chapel.

In 1970, the Woodmoor Corporation acquired Magic Mountain and set about to resurrect the park as Heritage Square, a theme shopping village of artisan shops and attractions. Opening in 1971, it featured several popular places, including the Metal Master, General Store, Glassblower, Gasthaus beer garden restaurant, and Cedar Chest. A group of comedy melodramatic players formed in Estes Park led by G. William Oakley took possession of the Magic Mountain Play House in 1972, as the Heritage Square Players, and opened the Heritage Square Opera House. In 1973, they retrofitted the building across the main thoroughfare for an auditorium theater, while the Christmas Tree shop opened nearby, one of the first year-round Christmas shops in the country. Also that year, upon Jackson Hill, an alpine slide was built.

In 1988, the Opera House was reborn under direction of actor T.J. Mullin as the Heritage Square Music Hall; it closed in 2013.

=== Current ownership ===
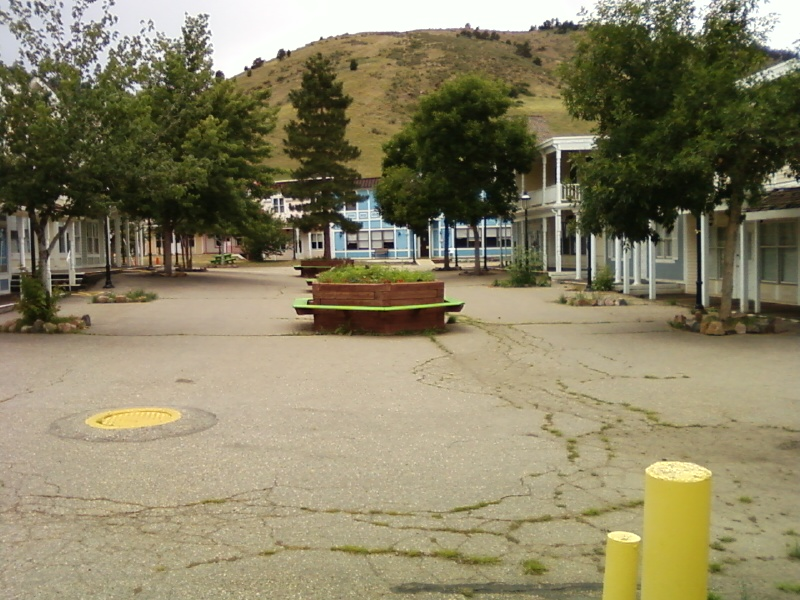
An abandoned area with vacant buildings one block over from "Main Street".

Heritage Square's ownership has changed hands many times. Currently, Heritage Square is owned by Martin Marietta Corporation, which also owns the quarry next to the complex. The previous ownership was Lafarge, which bought Heritage Square early in the 1990s.

Following the 2015 season, the Alpine Slide and the Town closed. Miner's Maze and the Church were relocated. The Amusement Park at Heritage Square, including the Garden Grill, the Corporate Picnic Areas and the Victorian Event Center, remained open until 2018.

== Railroads ==
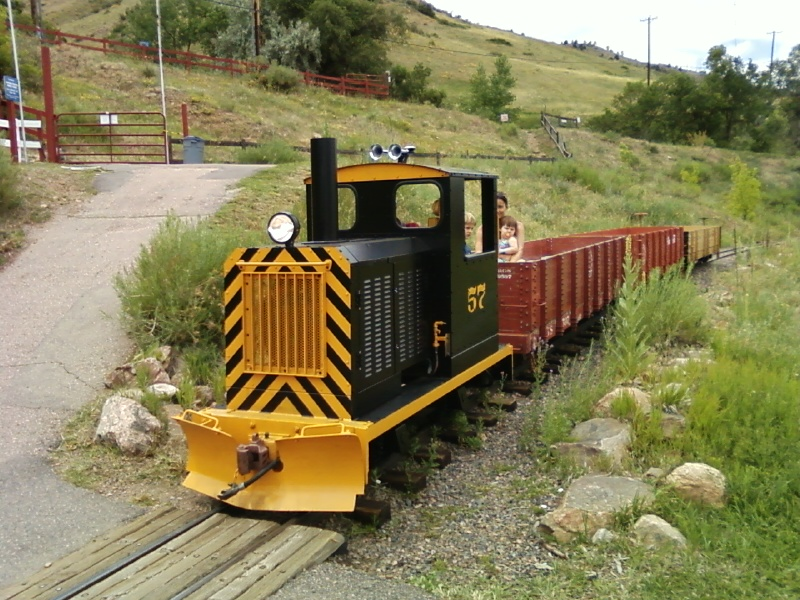
The Rio Golden Railroad at walkway crossing near the alpine slide.

Heritage Square's railroad, known successively as the Magic Mountain Railroad, High Country Railroad, and Rio Golden Railroad, has been operated by these steam powered locomotives through its existence:

- D&RG/RGS locomotive #42 (Baldwin, narrow gauge, 1887) - operated 1959-61
- Lima Shay locomotive #3118 (Lima, narrow gauge, 1920) - 24 inch gauge, operated 1975-89
- Denver & Rio Golden locomotive #463 (Ulrich, miniature gauge, 1998) - operated 1998-2006
- Rio Golden locomotive #1 (gas hydraulic drive, weighs 3,000 lbs) - operated 2006–present

== Honors ==
In 1975, the Jefferson County Historical Commission awarded Heritage Square designation as a Centennial Site.
