= Sanford E. Reisenbach =

American business executive (1932–2015)

- Born: May 13, 1932
- Died: January 6, 2015 (aged 82); Beverly Hills, California, United States
- Other names: Sandy Reisenbach
- Occupation: Warner Bros. marketing executive

Sanford E. "Sandy" Reisenbach (May 13, 1932 – January 6, 2015) was the longtime marketing executive for Warner Bros. He lived in Beverly Hills, California. According to The Hollywood Reporter, Reisenbach guided over 250 advertising campaigns. He died at 82 in January 2015. At the 87th Academy Awards, Reisenbach was included in the "In Memoriam" segment.

Reisenbach began his career in the early 1950s, working at the mailroom of Dancer Fitzgerald Sample. He earned his college degree by going to night classes at New York University's School of Commerce. He later left Dancer Fitzgerald Sample and joined the advertising company Grey Global Group, working his way up to Media Director and creating an entertainment division which had Warner Bros. Studios as a client. Warner CEOs Steve Ross, Ted Ashley, and Frank Wells were so impressed by Reisenbach - who had been employed by Grey for 20 years at this point - that they asked him to leave Grey to work for Warner.

Reisenbach is survived by his wife Gayle and two daughters. He was the father of John A. Reisenbach, the victim of a seemingly random murder in his New York neighborhood. That crime led to the establishment of The John A. Reisenbach Foundation, with a mission centered on improving safety and quality of life in New York City.
