= Buckskin Joe =

Former theme park in Fremont County, Colorado, United States

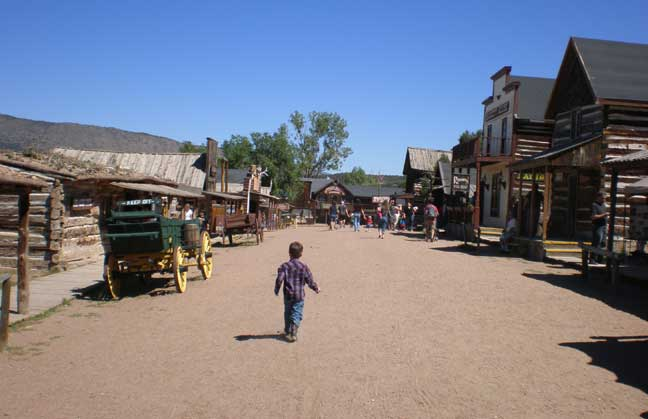
- Buckskin Joe
- Interactive map of Buckskin Joe
- Location: Buckskin Joe, Colorado, United States
- Coordinates: 38°28′35″N 105°19′37″W
- Opened: 1957
- Closed: 2010

Buckskin Joe was a Western-style theme park and railway in Fremont County, Colorado, United States, about 8 miles (13 km) west of Cañon City.

== Description ==
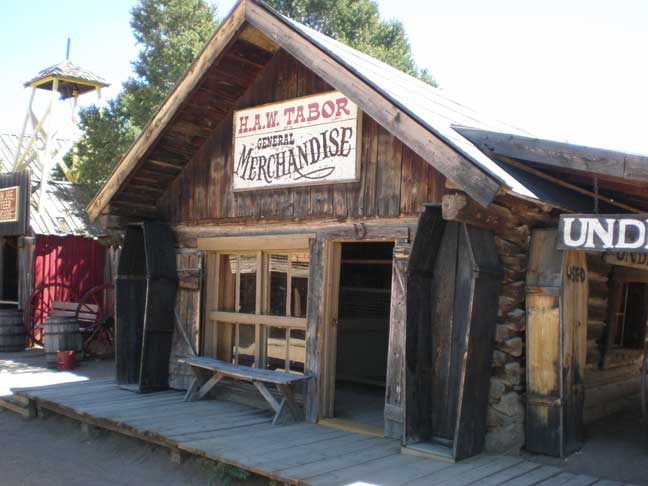
Horace Tabor's store was brought from the ghost town of Buckskin Joe to its namesake theme park

The park was located 1 mile (1.6 km) south of U.S. Route 50 along the road to the Royal Gorge Bridge. Features of the park included gun fights, 30 authentic buildings from the Colorado 19th century frontier, themed entertainment, full service saloon and restaurant. There was also the Mystery House and a horse-drawn trolley ride. The town featured a donkey as the mayor. The mayor of Buckskin Joe resided in a small building and was allowed free range of the park.

Buckskin Joe was built as a film set in 1957 by Metro-Goldwyn-Mayer director Malcolm F. Brown, by bringing together old buildings from around central Colorado, and assembling them into an old western-style town. The name was taken from the former mining town, now ghost town, of Buckskin Joe, west of Fairplay, Colorado. The only building in the theme park from the original Buckskin Joe is the general store originally owned by Colorado pioneer Horace Tabor. In 1958 the owners began admitting tourists between filmings, and developed the location into a western theme park.

The Town of Terror, a later addition, was voted the best Halloween haunted attraction in Colorado two years in a row. Every October the staff of Buckskin Joe would transform the mild mannered attraction into a haunted attraction, capitalizing on the town's real haunted history. The town was also featured on the History Channel's "Haunted Rockies Series" for its unexplained happenings.

On September 2, 2010, owner Greg Tabuteau announced the sale of Buckskin Joe and its associated attraction the "Royal Gorge Scenic Railway", to an anonymous purchaser. The owner was later identified as Florida billionaire William Koch who plans to move the historic ghost town to his ranch near Gunnison. The final day of operation for the town was September 12, 2010.

== Film location ==
The town was a western movie filming location with more than 21 films to its credit, including Cat Ballou, The Cowboys and The Sacketts. The 1991 television feature Conagher starring Sam Elliott, Katharine Ross, Ken Curtis and Barry Corbin was filmed at Buckskin Joe. Conagher was the last film in which Curtis appeared. The final movie to be filmed at Buckskin Joe was "Cactus Creek"; filming concluded just before the sale of the town was announced.

=== Partial list of films ===
- Cat Ballou (1965) Jane Fonda, Lee Marvin
- True Grit (1969) John Wayne, Glen Campbell, Kim Darby
- Barquero (1970) Lee Van Cleef, Warren Oates, Forrest Tucker
- The Cowboys (1972) John Wayne, Roscoe Lee Browne, Bruce Dern, Slim Pickens
- The Brothers O'Toole (1973) John Astin
- Mr. Majestyk (1974) Charles Bronson
- The Dutchess and the Dirtwater Fox (1976) George Segal, Goldie Hawn
- The White Buffalo (1977) Charles Bronson, Jack Warden
- How the West Was Won (1977 TV mini-series) James Arness, Eva Marie Saint
- Comes a Horseman (1978) James Caan, Jane Fonda, Jason Robards
- True Grit: A Further Adventure (1978 TV movie) Warren Oates
- Silverado (1985) Kevin Kline, Scott Glenn, Kevin Costner, Danny Glover, John Cleese
- Conagher (1991) Sam Elliott, Katharine Ross, Ken Curtis, Barry Corbin.
- The Sacketts (1991) two-part television movie, Sam Elliott, Tom Selleck
- Cannibal! The Musical (1993) Trey Parker
- Lightning Jack (1994) Paul Hogan, Cuba Gooding Jr.
