= C. V. Wood =

American developer of amusement parks (1920–1992)

- Born: Cornelius Vanderbilt Wood Jr. December 17, 1920; Waynoka, Oklahoma, U.S.
- Died: March 14, 1992 (aged 71); Houston, Texas, U.S.
- Occupations: Engineer, creator/builder of theme parks
- Employer(s): Walt Disney Imagineering (Disneyland Vice President/General Manager)
- Organization(s): Marco Engineering, Inc. (President)
- Spouse: Joanne Dru (m. 1972)
- Relatives: Peter Marshall (brother-in-law)

Cornelius Vanderbilt Wood Jr. (December 17, 1920 – March 14, 1992) was an American developer of theme parks and planned communities. He was the chief developer of Disneyland and then, through his own company, Marco Engineering, he developed other parks in several locations across the country. These theme parks included Freedomland U.S.A. in New York City, Pleasure Island in Wakefield, Massachusetts and Six Flags Over Texas in Arlington, Texas.

== Early life ==
Cornelius Vanderbilt Wood was born in Waynoka, Oklahoma. Throughout his early life, Wood was referred to as Junior and “Woodsy.” Later on, friends and business colleagues called him “C.V. Wood” or “C.V.” or “Woody.” The family moved to Amarillo, Texas following Wood’s father's promotion within the Santa Fe Railway. After high school, Wood attended Hardin-Simmons University in Abilene and became a champion trick roper for the school’s Cowboy Marching Band. Wood’s employment began in 1941 and included nine years at Convair (formed in 1943 by the merger of Consolidated Aircraft and Vultee Aircraft), an American aircraft manufacturing company that later expanded into rockets and spacecraft. He became a chief industrial engineer and contributed to innovations in the manufacture of aircraft, despite having no degree in engineering. His first supervisor was Fred V. Schumacher, who would reunite with Wood on later projects.

Wood was employed by the Stanford Research Institute (SRI) during the early 1950s when he first met Walt Disney. Wood was tapped to lead the team that had been assembled to crunch the numbers and find a location for the park that would become Disneyland. SRI, located in Menlo Park, California, is a nonprofit research and development organization founded by the trustees of Stanford University. The firm later separated from the university in 1970.

== Career ==
=== Stanford Research Institute & Disneyland ===
Wood was hired away from the Stanford Research Institute during 1954 by the Disney brothers, Walt and Roy, to become vice president and general manager of the Disneyland project. He was Disneyland's first employee. At 34 years old, Wood tapped into the brothers' ideas to help bring Disneyland to life. Wood worked closely with the Disney brothers and other employees. He also hired his old Texas friends and others he had known at Convair and at the Stanford Research Institute. He also employed set designers, artists, special effects technicians and other talent. Wood contributed ideas to the development of Disneyland and worked closely with the Disney brothers and other members of the project team.

Wood often said that Walt Disney initially treated him as a son. But, over time, the relationship became strained. The Disneys sometimes were uncomfortable around Wood or, more specifically, with some of his sales and other tactics that he employed to build Disneyland. Walt Disney also raised a number of issues that involved Wood, including that the man he hired was receiving too much credit for Disneyland.

Within a year after Disneyland opened, Wood and the Disneys parted ways. Some people who were there at the time said Walt Disney fired Wood. Others said Roy Disney cut the ties. Even others said Wood realized the relationship had soured and left the company. One longtime employee, Bob Gurr, who was loyal to the Disneys, said that Wood was a con man. Another employee, Van Arsdale France, believed that the relationship would not survive, because Wood and Walt Disney both were fiercely independent.

Soon after the split, Wood's role in the creation of Disneyland was omitted from all company records and histories. Over the years, the Walt Disney Company has honored various executives instrumental in the construction of Disneyland with window signs designating them as the proprietors of fictional businesses along Main Street, U.S.A., with one exception: "There is no window for C. V. Wood."

=== Marco Engineering ===
After leaving Disneyland, Wood created Marco Engineering, Inc. to design theme parks. Many Disney employees joined him and he had access to the vendors and other talent available to him during the Disneyland days. He billed himself as "The Master Planner of Disneyland." A Disney lawsuit stopped him from using that title, but it did not seek financial damages. Wood's firm helped create Magic Mountain (later Heritage Square, now defunct) at Golden, Colorado during 1957, Pleasure Island (in Wakefield, Massachusetts, during 1959, Freedomland U.S.A. (on the current site of Co-op City and its adjacent shopping center in the Bronx, a borough of New York City), during 1960, and initial work on Six Flags Over Texas before Marco employee Randall Duell took over the project.

Magic Mountain lasted less than two years and was not completed due to financial issues. Pleasure Island existed from 1959 until 1969, but it too faced considerable financial issues. Freedomland also faced significant financial problems that led to bankruptcy. Later accounts have suggested that the property's owners intended to obtain zoning variances for the subsequent development of Co-op City. Six Flags Over Texas continues today as a successful park that has seen many changes from its original concept.

Although Wood and his Marco Engineering team designed and built Magic Mountain, Pleasure Island and Freedomland, the parks were operated by separate local management groups. About five years after the park was declared bankrupt, the landowner, William Zeckendorf, Sr., publicly acknowledged that the park was a "placeholder" for the property until land variances were obtained for development.

During 1961, Wood merged Marco Engineering with the McCulloch Motors Corporation, which had been a sponsor at Freedomland. Robert Paxton McCulloch had purchased Lake Havasu and other property in Arizona. McCulloch and Wood created the Lake Havasu community, with Wood as the city planner. Wood told McCulloch of the availability of the London Bridge which was being replaced after 130 years of use in London, England. McCulloch purchased the bridge, had it dismantled stone-by-stone, transported it to the U.S., and had it reassembled in Arizona. The city's C.V. Wood Community Center is named for Wood. Wood and McCulloch later developed Fountain Hills, Arizona. Around 1970 Woods developed the vast and sprawling bedroom community of Spring Creek, Nevada, lying between Elko and Lamoille.

In 1987, Wood became an assistant to the chairman of Lorimar Telepictures and helped merge the company with Time Warner. He was then retained by Warner Bros. to pioneer its entry into the studio tour attraction business. During 1991, as president of Warner Bros. Recreational Enterprises Division, Wood participated in the design and development of Warner Bros. Movie World theme park in Gold Coast, Queensland Australia.

== Personal life ==
C.V. Wood was taught Transcendental Meditation by Nancy Cooke de Herrera in the late 1960s.

Wood spent nearly 25 years presiding over the annual World Championship Chili Cookoff that he co-founded with race car designer Carroll Shelby and was twice crowned chili cook-off world champion. Wood also had an interest in the unknown, specifically bigfoot and space aliens.

During 1985, Wood received a credited role as a barkeeper in the film Trinity: Good Guys and Bad Guys.

In 1991, Wood was accused of sexual harassment by a former administrator at Warner Bros. No further information about the allegation has been documented.

At the time of his death from lung cancer, Wood had been married for 20 years to actress Joanne Dru, the sister of actor, singer and television game show host Peter Marshall. Wood was honored by the International Association of Amusement Parks and Attractions (IAAPA) when he was inducted posthumously into its Hall of Fame in 1994.

Wood has been the subject of several later publications. Todd James Pierce's Three Years in Wonderland (University Press of Mississippi, 2016) examines the relationship between the Disney brothers and Wood during the development of Disneyland. Michael R. Virgintino's Freedomland U.S.A.: The Definitive Story (Theme Park Press, 2019) chronicles the history of Freedomland U.S.A. from its conception to its bankruptcy and includes a chapter on Wood, who is also discussed elsewhere in the book.
