= List of works by Bruce Goff =

Chronological list of houses, commercial buildings and other works by Bruce Goff.

== 1910s-1940s ==
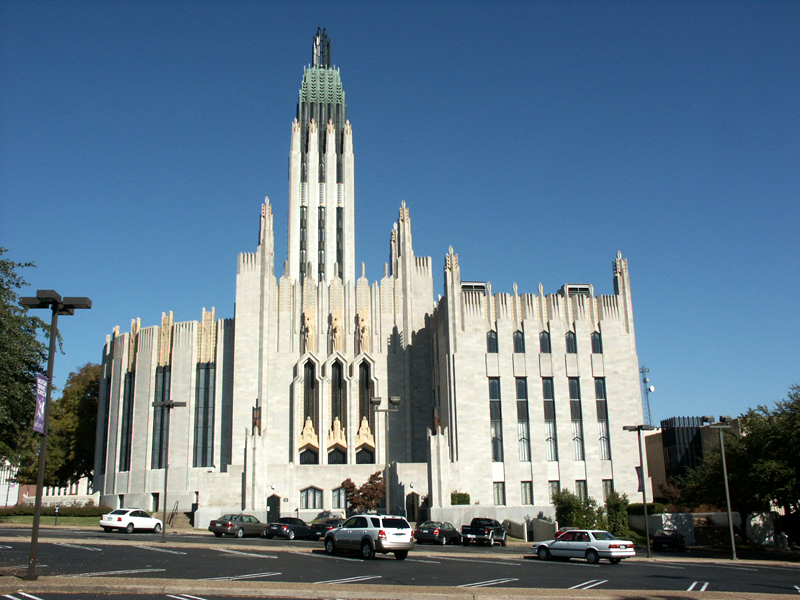
Boston Avenue Methodist Church

- 1917: Percy and Evaline Elliott House, 312 E. 19th Street, Tulsa, Oklahoma
- 1918: Quaker Avenue House, 1401 S. Quaker Avenue, Tulsa, Oklahoma
- 1919: Carson Avenue House, 1639 S. Carson Avenue, Tulsa, Oklahoma
- 1919: Oil Operator House, 1728 S. Madison Avenue, Tulsa, Oklahoma
- 1919: South Yorktown Avenue House, 1732 S. Yorktown Avenue, Tulsa, Oklahoma
- 1921: East Nineteenth Street House, 320 E. 19th Street, Tulsa, Oklahoma
- 1922: G. Way House, Northeast corner of E. 31st Street and S. Peoria Avenue, Tulsa, Oklahoma (The house was significantly altered in 1983, leaving little of the original design intact)
- 1923: Adah Robinson Studio, 1119 S. Owasso Avenue, Tulsa, Oklahoma
- 1926: Boston Avenue Methodist Church, 1301 South Boston Ave., Tulsa, Oklahoma (with Adah Robinson, officially credited to Rush, Endacott and Rush), NRHP-listed
- 1925: South Madison Avenue House, 1712 S. Madison Avenue, Tulsa, Oklahoma
- 1925: Consolidated Cut Stone Office Building, 1323 East 5th Street, Tulsa, Oklahoma
- 1925: Hansen House, 2262 S. Troost Avenue, Tulsa, Oklahoma
- 1926: Day Building, 512 S. Boston Avenue, Tulsa, Oklahoma
- 1927: Tulsa Club, 115 E. Fifth St., Tulsa, Oklahoma
- 1927: Page Warehouse, 1301 South Elgin Street, Tulsa, Oklahoma (Demolished in 1977)
- 1928: Guaranty Laundry, 2036 E. 11th Street, Tulsa, Oklahoma
- 1928: Christ the King Church (interior furniture, altars, and mosaics), 1530 S. Rockford Avenue, Tulsa, Oklahoma
- 1929: Riverside Studio, 1381 Riverside Dr., Tulsa, Oklahoma, International Style, NRHP-listed
- 1929: Midwest Equitable Meter Company Warehouse, 3200 Charles Page Boulevard, Tulsa, Oklahoma
- 1930: Tulsa Convention Hall (Brady Hall) Alterations, 105 West Brady Street, Tulsa, Oklahoma
- 1930: Latham House, 221 E. 21st Street, Tulsa, Oklahoma
- 1938: Turzak House, Chicago, Illinois
- 1939: Cole House, Park Ridge, Illinois
- 1940: Colmorgan House, Glenview, Illinois
- 1940: Unseth House, Park Ridge, Illinois
- 1947: Bachman House, Chicago, Illinois
- 1941: Bartman House (also known as Triaero), Fern Creek, Kentucky
- 1947: Ruth VanSickle Ford House, Aurora, Illinois
- 1947: Ledbetter House, 701 W. Brooks, Norman, Oklahoma, NRHP-listed
- 1948: Hopewell Baptist Church, 5801 NW 178th St., Edmond, Oklahoma, NRHP-listed
- 1949: Julius Cox House, 1300 N. Cimarron Avenue, Boise City, Oklahoma

== 1950s-1960s ==
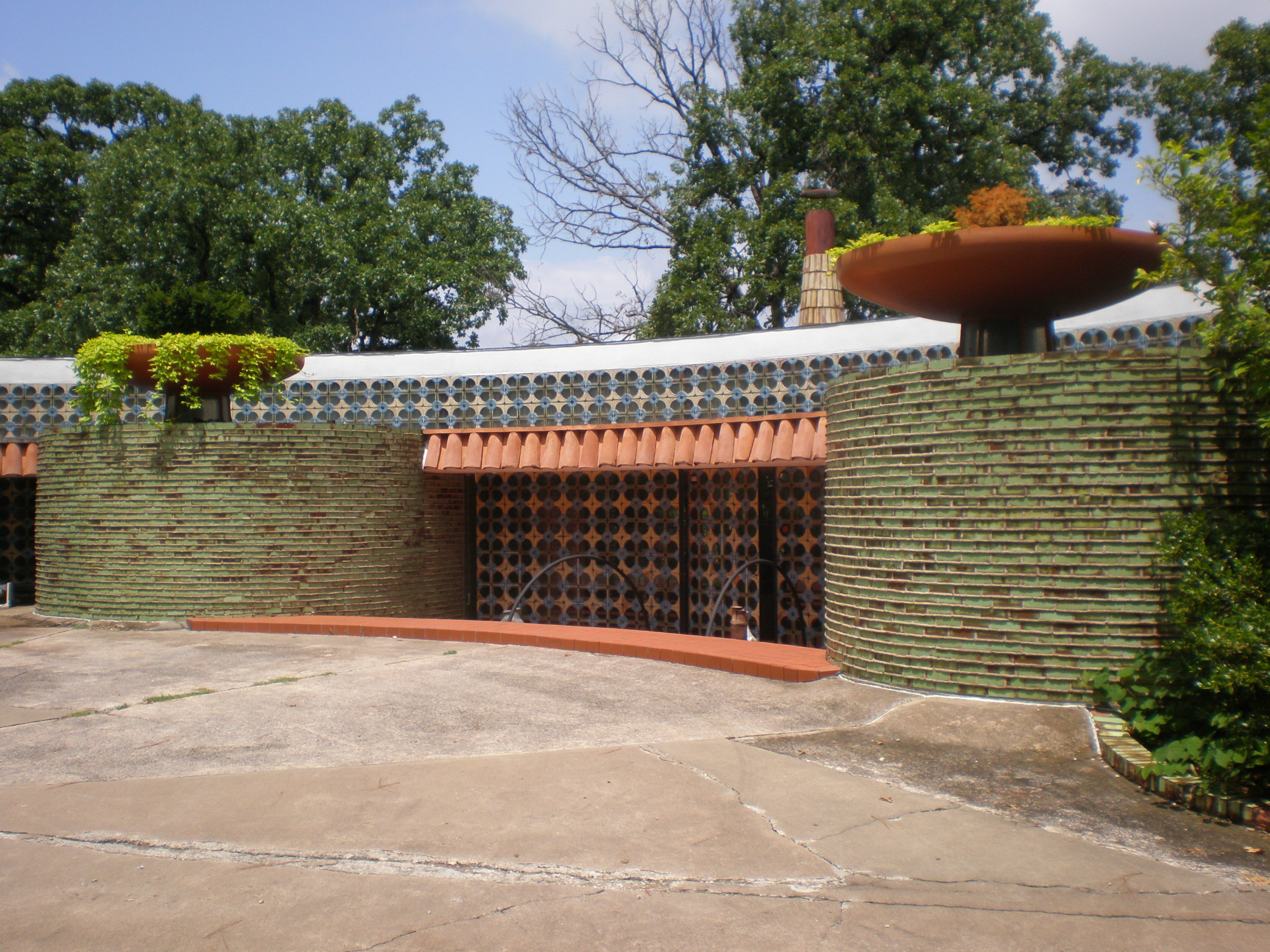
John Frank House

- 1950: Bavinger House, 730 60th Avenue NE, Norman, Oklahoma, NRHP-listed (severely damaged in 2011, demolished in 2016)
- 1950: Lewis Wetzler Subdivision, Timberdell Road, Norman, Oklahoma
- 1950: John Keys House, 911 W Timberdell Road, Norman, Oklahoma
- 1951: Magyness House, 909 W Timberdell Road, Norman, Oklahoma
- 1952: Roger Corsaw House, 1210 Woodland Drive, Norman, Oklahoma
- 1954: Garvey House, Urbana, Illinois
- 1955: John Frank House, 1300 Luker Lane, Sapulpa, Oklahoma, NRHP-listed
- 1956: Joe D. Price House and Studio (also known as Shin'enKan), Starview Farm, Bartlesville, Oklahoma (destroyed by arson in 1996)
- 1957: C. A. Comer House, 1316 N. Creek, Dewey, Oklahoma
- 1957: J.O. and Mary Motsenbocker House, 2416 SE Circle Drive, Bartlesville, Oklahoma
- 1957: The Round House, 7507 Baxtershire, Dallas, Texas (Designed by Goff in 1957 but built by Parker without Goff after dispute in 1961.)
- 1957: Donald Pollock House, 2400 NW 59th St., Oklahoma City, Oklahoma, NRHP-listed
- 1957: Miller Brothers Service Station, Lynn Road, Pawhuska, Oklahoma
- 1958: Durst House, Houston, Texas
- 1958: L.A. Freeman House, 6565 Park Circle Drive, Joplin, Missouri
- 1958: Gutman House, Gulfport, Mississippi (destroyed by fire)
- 1958: Harold Jones House, 3411 SE Wildwood Court, Bartlesville, Oklahoma
- 1958: Robert White House, 1525 SW Whiteway Court, Bartlesville, Oklahoma
- 1959: Russell Collins House, 3400 SE Wildwood Court, Bartlesville, Oklahoma
- 1959: Richard Bennett House, 2841 Silver Lake Road, Bartlesville, Oklahoma
- 1959: J.R. Akright House Alterations, 2412 SE Circle Drive, Bartlesville, Oklahoma
- 1959: Redeemer Lutheran Church Education Building, 3700 SE Woodland Road, Bartlesville, Oklahoma
- 1960: Gryder House, Ocean Springs, Mississippi
- 1961: Jame Fitchette House, 1900 SE Saturn Court, Bartlesville, Oklahoma
- 1961: John Quincy Adams House, 108 Fairmont Road, Vinita, Oklahoma
- 1962: Woodland Hills Entrance Feature, Woodland Hills Boulevard, Roland, Oklahoma
- 1962: The First Celestine Barby House, 114 Avenue N, Beaver, Oklahoma
- 1963: Play Tower, Sooner Park, Bartlesville, Oklahoma
- 1964: William Dace House, 409 Avenue R, Beaver, Oklahoma
- 1965: Duncan House, Cobden, Illinois
- 1965: Hyde House, Prairie Village, Kansas
- 1965: Nicol House, Kansas City, Missouri
- 1965: Searing House, Prairie Village, Kansas
- 1966: Jacquart House, Sublette, Kansas
- 1968: Mitchell House, Dodge City, Kansas

== 1970s-1980s ==
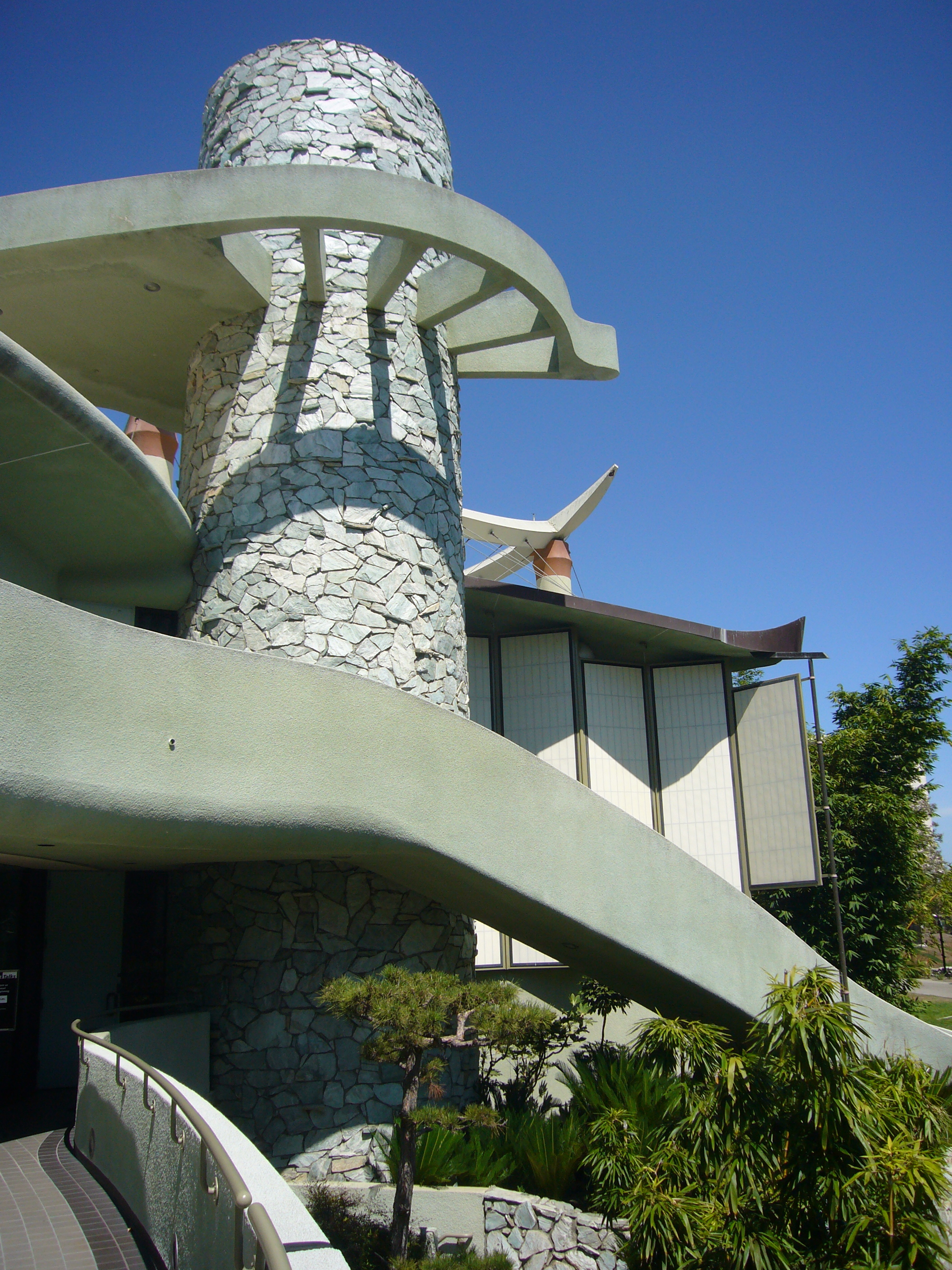
Pavilion for Japanese Art

- 1970: Glen Harder House, Mountain Lake, Minnesota (destroyed by fire)
- 1972: Hollywood House, 18165/18171 Meandering Way, Flint, Texas
- 1974: Plunkett House, 17148 Fountain Circle, Flint, Texas
- 1974: Barby House, Tucson, Arizona
- 1975: Liberty Federal Savings Bank Mosaic Mural, 232 South Main, Stillwater, Oklahoma (Goff only did the mural; the building's architect is Tom Rodgers)
- 1978: Pavilion for Japanese Art at the Los Angeles County Museum of Art, Los Angeles, California
- 1979: Struckus House, Woodland Hills, California (One of Goff's last completed designs before his death; Bart Prince supervised its completion.)
- 1980: Jacob Harder House, Mountain Lake, Minnesota
