= 2005 in radio =

The year 2005 in radio involved some significant events.

== Events ==
- April 29 – KFRC 610 AM in San Francisco, switches formats as a result of ownership change. KFRC becomes KEAR, the "Sound of the New Life" (Family Radio), a listener-supported, gospel/religious only station. It had been previously KFRC from September 1924 to this date. KFRC continued to broadcast on its sister station 99.7 FM.
- July – Digital Radio Mondiale conducts an extensive test of using the 11 meter (26 MHz) shortwave band for local digital shortwave radio broadcasts in Mexico City.
- November 3 – Cumulus-owned KCHZ/Kansas City flips formats from Mainstream Top 40 ("Z 95.7") to Rhythmic Top 40, branded as "95-7 The Vibe."
- November 9 – Mediaweek announces that radio personality Bob Kingsley is stepping down as host of American Country Countdown after being associated with the program for 31 years (27 of them as host). His last countdown program airs December 24. Kix Brooks (one half of the country music superstar duo Brooks & Dunn) is slated to take over in January 2006. Kingsley's new radio program, Bob Kingsley's Country Top 40. debuts December 31 (featuring the 2005 year-end countdown).
- December 1 – XM Radio Canada launches.
- December 3 – Sirius Canada launches.
- Triple J has the first J Award in 2005, to celebrate the 30th anniversary of the station's establishment.

== Debuts ==
- April 5 – CHDI-FM debuts in Edmonton.
- May 2 – Radio Lynx began syndicating the Doug Basham program.
- Dicky Barrett, former singer with The Mighty Mighty Bosstones became the host of his own radio show, The Mighty Morning Show on Los Angeles's Indie 103.1. The show runs until March 22, 2006.
- Jack FM debuts in several cities such as KCBS-FM Los Angeles on March 17, and WCBS-FM New York on June 3.
- December 31 – Bob Kingsley's Country Top 40 debuts

== Closings ==
- Democracy Radio folds November 4 when founder Tom Athans joins management staff of Air America Radio.
- Seattle radio hosts Robin and Maynard were fired from KQBZ on November 9.
- Susquehanna Radio Corporation absorbed into Cumulus Media

== Deaths ==
- January 2 - Cyril Fletcher, 91, English comic monologuist
- January 7 - Bernard "Buddy" Diliberto, 74, sports commentator in New Orleans for over 50 years.
- January 13 - Earl Cameron, 89?, Canadian broadcaster and anchor of The National (1959–1966)
- January 20 - Jan Nowak-Jeziorański, 91, Polish journalist and highly decorated World War II hero, head of the Radio Free Europe Polish section
- February 5 - Bob McAdorey, 69, Canadian television and radio broadcaster
- February 6 - Karl Haas, 91, U.S. classical music radio program host of Adventures in Good Music
- March 6
  - Chuck Thompson, 83, Baltimore Orioles broadcaster (complications of massive stroke)
  - Tommy Vance, 63, British radio DJ and TV host (stroke)
- March 19 - John Ebdon, 81, British radio broadcaster, Graecophile, author and director of the London Planetarium
- March 30 - "Dr." Don Rose, 70, American radio personality.
- June 11 - Gordon Baxter, 81, well-known radio personality in Southeast Texas, author and columnist.
- June 18 - Georgie Woods, 78, Philadelphia radio broadcast "legend", due to be inducted into the Philadelphia Broadcast Pioneers Hall of Fame.
- July 30 - Kathleen Wilson, 94, American actress.
- July 31 - Bill Shadel, 96, American radio broadcaster and news anchor (CBS Radio)
- October 7 - Tracey Miller, 51, radio host, pioneer of women's sports broadcasting, brain cancer.
- October 18 - Bill King, 78, American sports broadcaster.
- November 19 - John Timpson, 77, English presenter of the Today programme on BBC Radio 4
- November 20
  - Jonathan James-Moore, 59, former BBC Radio head of light entertainment, cancer.
  - Glenn Mitchell, 55, American Public Radio broadcaster, radio talk show host.
- December 3 - Allan Waters, 84, Canadian broadcasting icon
- December 21 - Hallam Tennyson, 85, British radio producer and great-grandson of Alfred, Lord Tennyson (suspected murder)
- date unknown
  - Ruth Bennett, 100, American disc jockey, mother of radio host Alex Bennett, allegedly the world's oldest album-oriented rock disc jockey on KMEL (1982–1983) at the age of 77.
  - Neil Strawser, 78, CBS Radio correspondent and anchor
  - Pierre van Ostade, 88, Dutch radio and television personality. .

== See also ==
- Radio broadcasting
