= Glen Mitchell =

Glen Mitchell may refer to:

- Glen Mitchell (British cyclist) (born 1958), Olympic cyclist for Great Britain
- Glen Mitchell (New Zealand cyclist) (born 1972), Olympic cyclist for New Zealand
- Glen Mitchell House, house in Dodge City, Kansas, United States

== See also ==
- Glenn Mitchell (disambiguation)
