= Glenn Mitchell =

Glenn Mitchell may refer to:

- Glenn Mitchell (talk radio broadcaster) (1950–2005), American radio personality
- Glenn Mitchell (sports broadcaster) (born 1963), Australian former sports commentator and writer

== See also ==
- Glen Mitchell (disambiguation)
