= Struckus House =

Coordinates: 34°09′06″N 118°35′46″W

The Al Struckus House, or Struckus House, is a Modernist home located at 4510 Saltillo St. in Woodland Hills, Los Angeles.

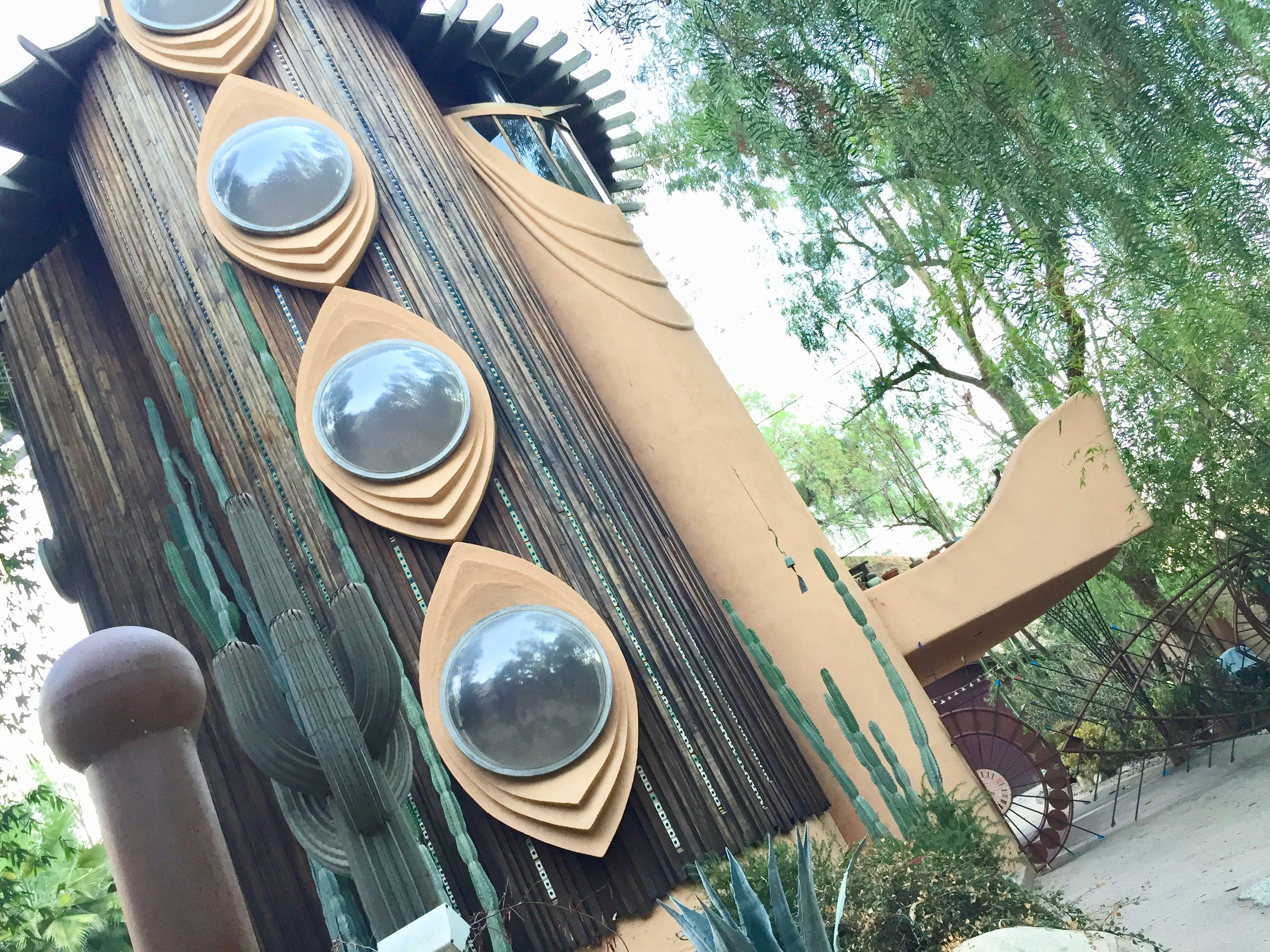
The "alien eyes" windows of the Struckus home

== History ==
Architect Bruce Goff designed the house for aeronautical engineer, woodworker, and art collector Al Struckus. Construction began in 1982 but was not fully complete until 1994; Bart Prince oversaw the completion of the design. It is a tall, cylindrical structure made with natural redwood with "round futuristic windows resembl[ing] the eyes of an alien creature." It is the only private residence Goff built in California.
