= Harvey Ferrero =

American architect (1934–2025)

- Born: January 24, 1934; Detroit, Michigan, U.S.
- Died: November 7, 2025 (aged 91)
- Education: Lawrence Technical University
- Occupation: Architect
- Awards: Balthazar Korab Award
- Practice: Ferrero Architects
- Buildings: Max Klein Building, Peterson House

Harvey Joe Ferrero (January 24, 1934 – November 7, 2025) was an American architect, architectural illustration expert, the founder of Ferrero Architects, and an adjunct professor of Lawrence Technical University.

== Early life and education ==
Harvey Joe Ferrero was born in Detroit, Michigan, on January 24, 1934, to Italian immigrants. His father was a factory worker who worked on battleship guns during World War 2. In his junior high school education, Ferrero took mechanical and architectural drawing classes. He later attended Cass Technical High School where he participated in Building and Drafting classes, which developed into the basis of his trade knowledge. Ferrero later chose Lawrence Technological University as an affordable alternative to the University of Michigan.

There were a variety of architects and designers that influenced Ferrero's architectural style. The dean of the college of engineering at that time, Doctor Earl Pellerin was inspirational for Ferrero as he also shared a passion for architectural graphics. Frank Lloyd Wright lectured at the university while Ferrero was still attending, providing another influence for Ferrero's design style. Ferrero commented on his opinion of Frank Lloyd Wright at the time as: “I thought, eh, Mies is okay. Corbeau, eh, he is alright, but this Wright guy really knows what’s happening...”. Ferrero also had the opportunity to see Bruce Goff lecture at Lawrence, who would become another major influencer to Ferrero's design sense later in life. He graduated from Lawrence Technological University with a Bachelor of Architectural Engineering in 1955.

== Early career and army ==
His first architectural job was with architect Paul Moffat, who he came into contact with via a Lawrence Alumni. He was then going to work with Alden B. Dow, an architect in Midland, Michigan, but Ferrero was drafted in 1956 before he could take the position. After completing basic training, Ferrero was assigned to the position of "Construction Draftsman" in Aberdeen, Maryland. However, this facility had no need of a draftsman and put him to work as an illustrator. In his free time, Ferrero wrote to Bruce Goff to see if he had educational design projects that needed architectural illustrations. Goff replied that Ferrero should draft illustrations of imaginary projects for his colleagues and send them to Goff for review. After corresponding back and forth, Goff wrote to Ferrero that he would be presenting a lecture at the Rhode Island School of Design. Ferrero was able to come see him present and meet with him, which led to Ferrero apprenticing with Goff after he finished his military service in 1958.

Ferrero apprenticed with Goff for two years in Bartlesville, Oklahoma. While there, Ferrero worked on a variety of projects such as: First Prize Studio, Lutheran Church, Freeman House, and the Kennedy House. His work mostly consisted of architectural renderings, but for the Freeman House he completed working drawings as well. He returned to Detroit in 1960 where he worked with the firm now known as Tozai Architecture + Interiors until he got his architectural license in 1962.

== Teaching ==
Ferrero taught at Lawrence from 1962 till 2002 as an adjunct professor. He mainly taught design studio and architectural illustration courses. The main focus of his teaching was to integrate drawings skills with architectural design ability. Ferrero felt passionate about fostering student growth and watching them progress as designers. In 1980, he taught a joint architectural studio at Lawrence with Bruce Goff. A major factor in his retiring from education was that he felt architectural drawing was no longer important and that computer representation had made it unnecessary. In 2011, his work was displayed and published by Lawrence in the Master Folio project.

== Major buildings ==
- 1976: Peterson House
- Jassendorf Residence
- Beattie Residence
- 1984: Max Klein Office Building, Southfield, Michigan

== Late career ==
After leaving the firm Tozai, Ferrero did architectural illustration work with Richard Roshon for four to five years. When Roshon left for a different illustrating endeavor, Ferrero began to do architectural illustrations on his own, occasionally visiting former firms to solicit opportunities. At this time, he also began doing freelance architectural design for homes. Ferrero's breakthrough project was the Max Klein office building that had construction completed in 1984. The design process for this project was decently strenuous since the client had very loose expectations for the project. On the client's suggestion, Ferrero had the studio he was teaching that semester compete in designing the office building with a $500 prize. This exercise helped Ferrero gain a clearer understanding of what Max Klein desired in the completed office building. In addition, this project earned an AIA Detroit award that year.

Ferrero received the Balthazar Korab Award from AIA Michigan in 2016.

== Death ==
Ferrero died on November 7, 2025, at the age of 91.
