= Hopewell Baptist Church =

Historic church in Oklahoma, United States

- U.S. National Register of Historic Places
- Hopewell Baptist Church in 2021

- Location within Oklahoma Location within the United States
- Location: 5801 NW 178th St., Edmond, Oklahoma
- Coordinates: 35°39′11″N 97°37′13″W
- Area: 1 acre (0.40 ha)
- Built: 1950
- Architect: Bruce Goff
- Architectural style: Organic
- MPS: Bruce Goff Designed Resources in Oklahoma MPS
- NRHP reference No.: 02001018
- Added to NRHP: September 14, 2002

The Hopewell Baptist Church in northwestern Oklahoma County, Oklahoma, also known as the Teepee Church, was designed by architect Bruce Goff in the modernist style. It was listed on the U.S. National Register of Historic Places in 2002. It was deemed "an excellent example of the architecture of Bruce Goff during the time he was Director of the School of Architecture at the University of Oklahoma."

== Structure ==
The teepee-shaped design was intended to be imaginative on a frugal budget, using surplus pipe and corrugated aluminum from oil fields, volunteer labor to weld the pipes and build the church, and local supplies like rock from quarries in nearby Calumet, Oklahoma.

The peak, which is about 80 feet high, is an open metal belfry containing no bell and 12 triangular windows that always leaked when it rained. The shingles were originally the color of the red soil that is characteristic to the area, but were eventually replaced by gray shingles. The base was finished with native rock and sheet metal.

The nave of the church was arranged in the round. The lower level held classrooms.

The exterior support structure features 12 exposed tapered trusses made of welded steel drill-stem pipes and painted russet color and secured by a compression ring. The 12 supports were nicknamed after the Twelve Apostles.

== Construction ==
The building was constructed by members of the church, who worked on evenings and weekends from 1947 to 1951 to build it. Construction used 1,000 tons of steel pipes.

The building cost $20,000, and Goff reduced his fee for the design and for supervising the construction to $1,200.

== Use ==
The building was used as a church until it closed in 1989, due to water leaks, and due to the high cost of heating and cooling a building with no insulation. The church owning the property was first known as Hopewell Baptist Church. After that, it was the Church at Edmond. Later, the non-denominational church, meeting in a separate building, was renamed to God's Tabernacle of Praise.

== Restoration ==
Asbestos was removed in 1999, but the building had serious damage to the exterior and interior of the building.

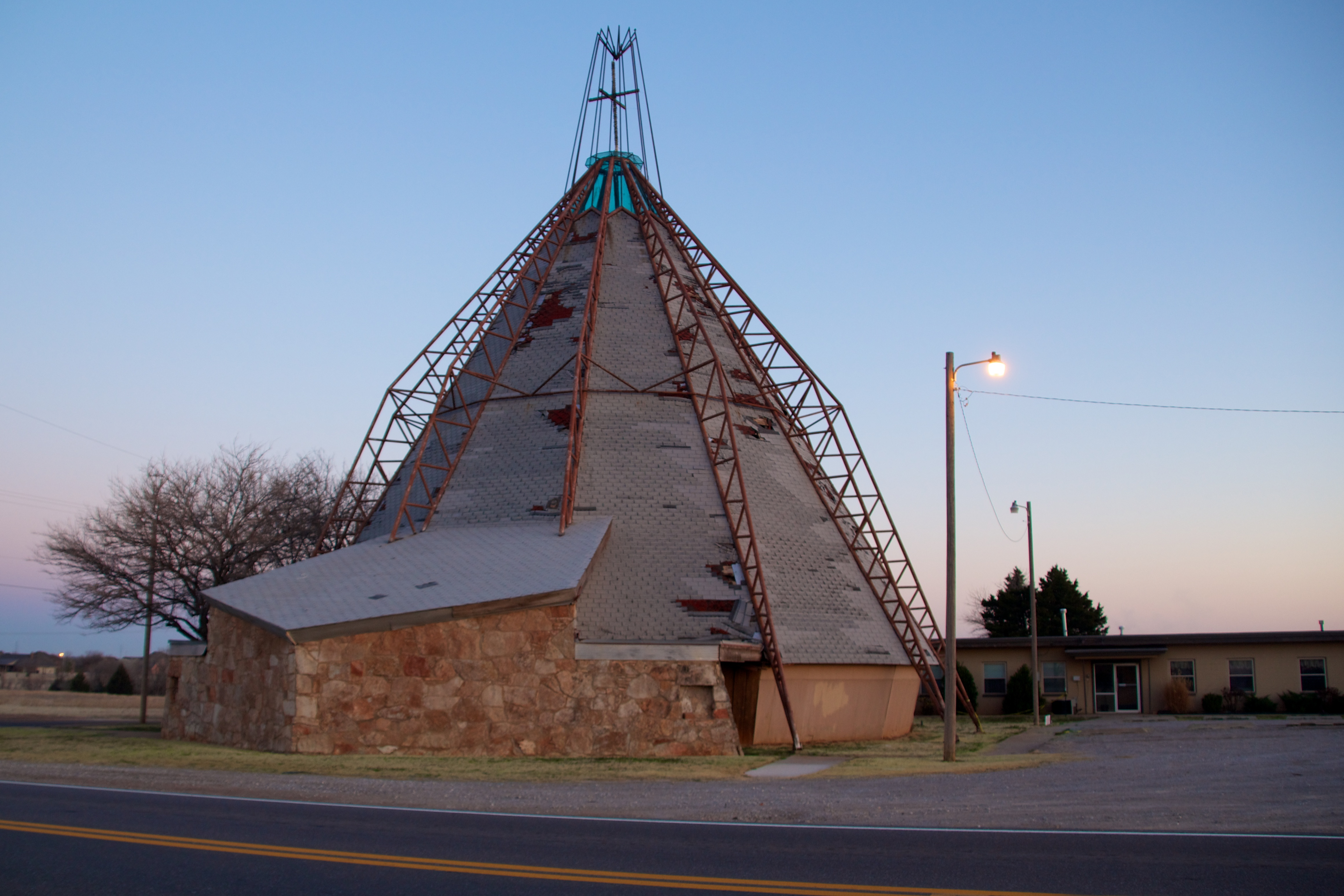
2013 picture of Hopewell Baptist Church, prior to 2013 reroofing

The Hopewell Heritage Foundation was formed in 2005 to raise $1.25 million to restore the church, plus money to pay for maintenance. The restoration effort is being led by Elliott and Associates Architects of Oklahoma.

The roof was replaced in late 2013 by Jenco Roofing Company to prevent further decay. As of 2015, the roof, windows, and doors had been fixed, but structural work was needed on the inside, to support the upstairs floor.
