= Donald Pollock House =

Historic house in Oklahoma, United States

- U.S. National Register of Historic Places
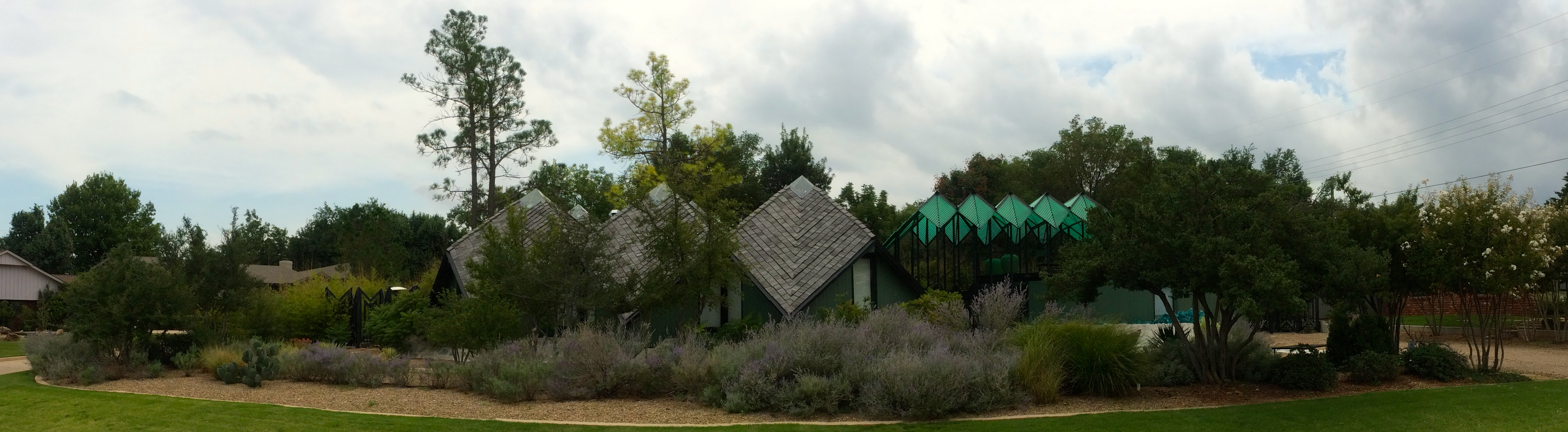

- Location within Oklahoma Location within the United States
- Location: 2400 NW 59th St., Oklahoma City, Oklahoma
- Coordinates: 35°32′7″N 97°33′13″W
- Area: less than one acre
- Built: 1957
- Architect: Bruce Goff
- Architectural style: Organic
- MPS: Bruce Goff Designed Resources in Oklahoma MPS
- NRHP reference No.: 01001356
- Added to NRHP: December 13, 2001

The Donald Pollock House is a historic house in Oklahoma City, Oklahoma. Designed by architect Bruce Goff, Nelson Brackin accompanied Goff in the renovation for Laura and Joe Warriner in 1966.

== Description and history ==
The house, designed by Bruce Goff and constructed in 1957, features steep hipped roofs over interlocking square areas, with skylights. The interior is partitioned by folding wood partitions. A studio with a screened porch on its roof is connected by a walkway over a reflecting pool.

Its NRHP nomination describes it as "an excellent example of the mature architecture of Bruce Goff" and "one of Goff's finest designs". It is related to the Goff-designed Wilson House in Pensacola, Florida. It was listed on the National Register of Historic Places on December 13, 2001.
