= Bachman House =

House in Chicago, Illinois, United States

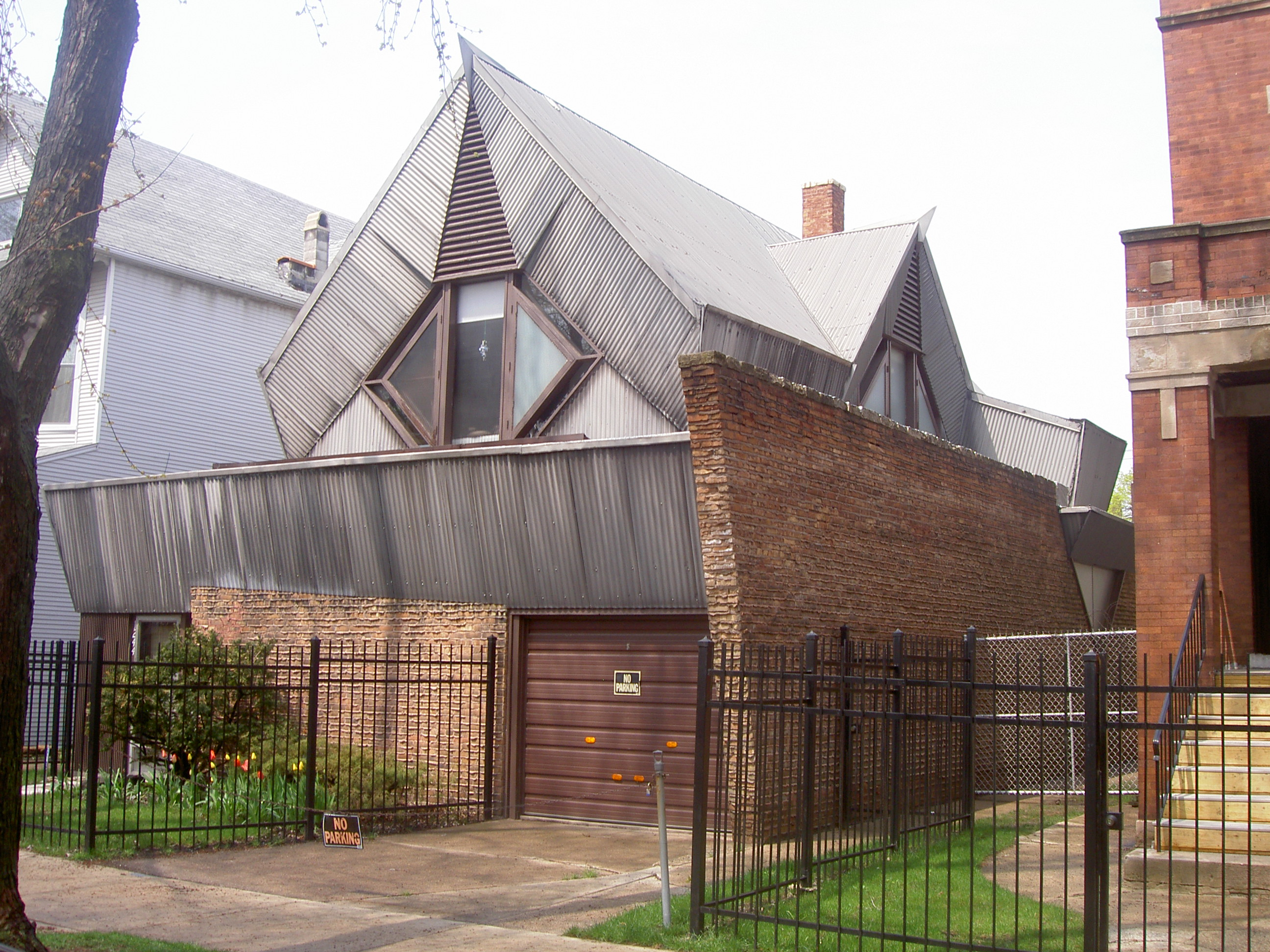
- Interactive map of the Bachman House area

General information
- Status: Completed
- Type: House
- Location: 1244 W. Carmen Ave., Chicago, Illinois, United States
- Coordinates: 41.9747°N 87.6616°W
- Construction started: 1947
- Completed: 1948

Design and construction
- Architect: Bruce Goff

Chicago Landmark
- Designated: December 9, 1992

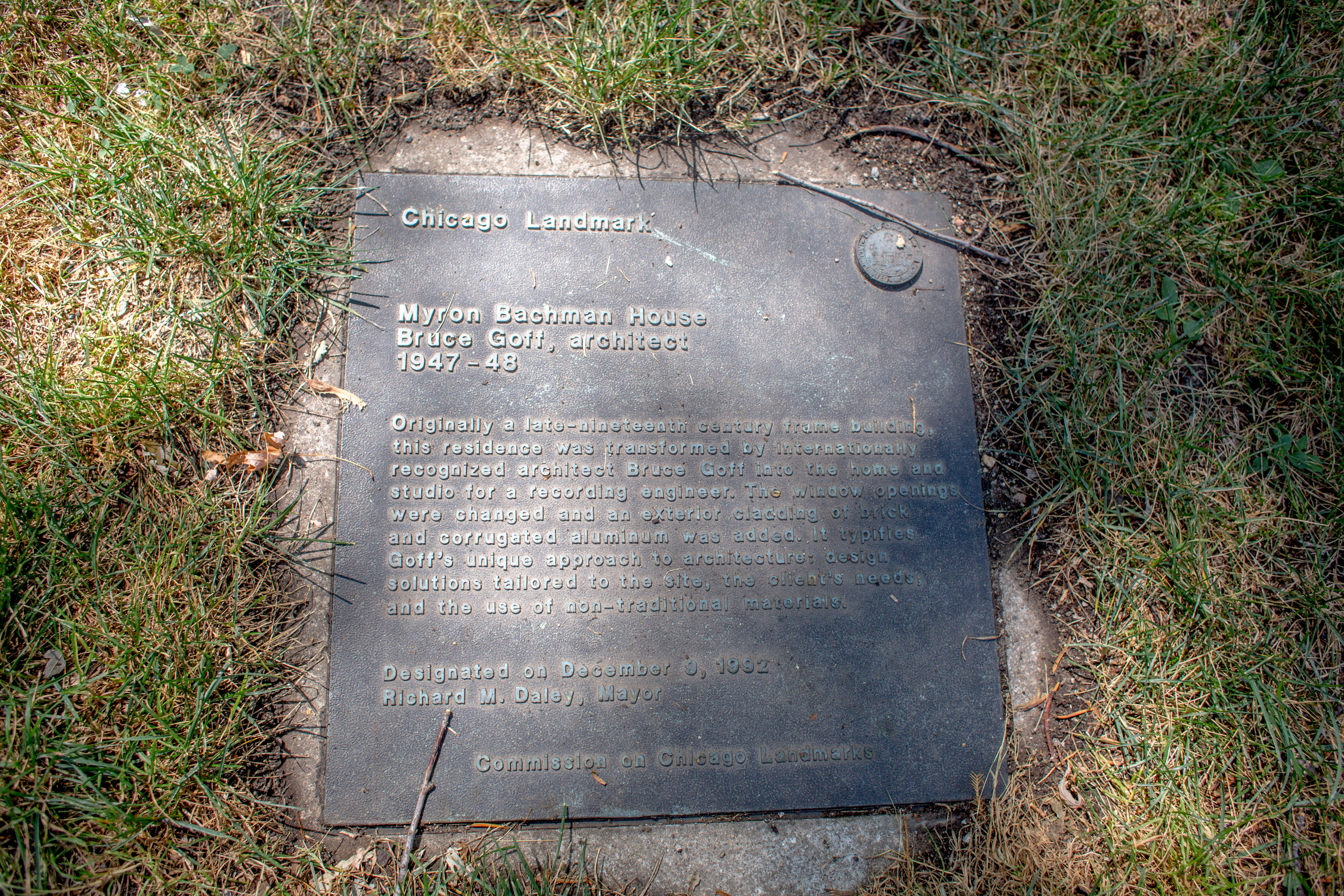
Marker

The Bachman House is a house in Chicago, Illinois, United States. It is located at 1244 W. Carmen Ave. The house was built between 1947 and 1948 by Bruce Goff. Architect Bruce Goff created a neighborhood sensation in 1948, when he remodeled a modest wood house (built in 1889) into the home and studio for recording engineer Myron Bachman. The window openings were changed and an exterior cladding of brick and corrugated aluminum was added. It remains a local attraction, as well as a nationally recognized example of work by one of architecture's most unusual figures. Much of Goff's architectural career was spent in Oklahoma, although he maintained a practice in Chicago from 1934 to 1942. Goff also designed the Turzak House, another Chicago Landmark. Bachman House was designated a Chicago Landmark on December 9, 1992.
