= Bavinger House =

Historic house in Oklahoma, United States

- Eugene Bavinger House
- Formerly listed on the U.S. National Register of Historic Places
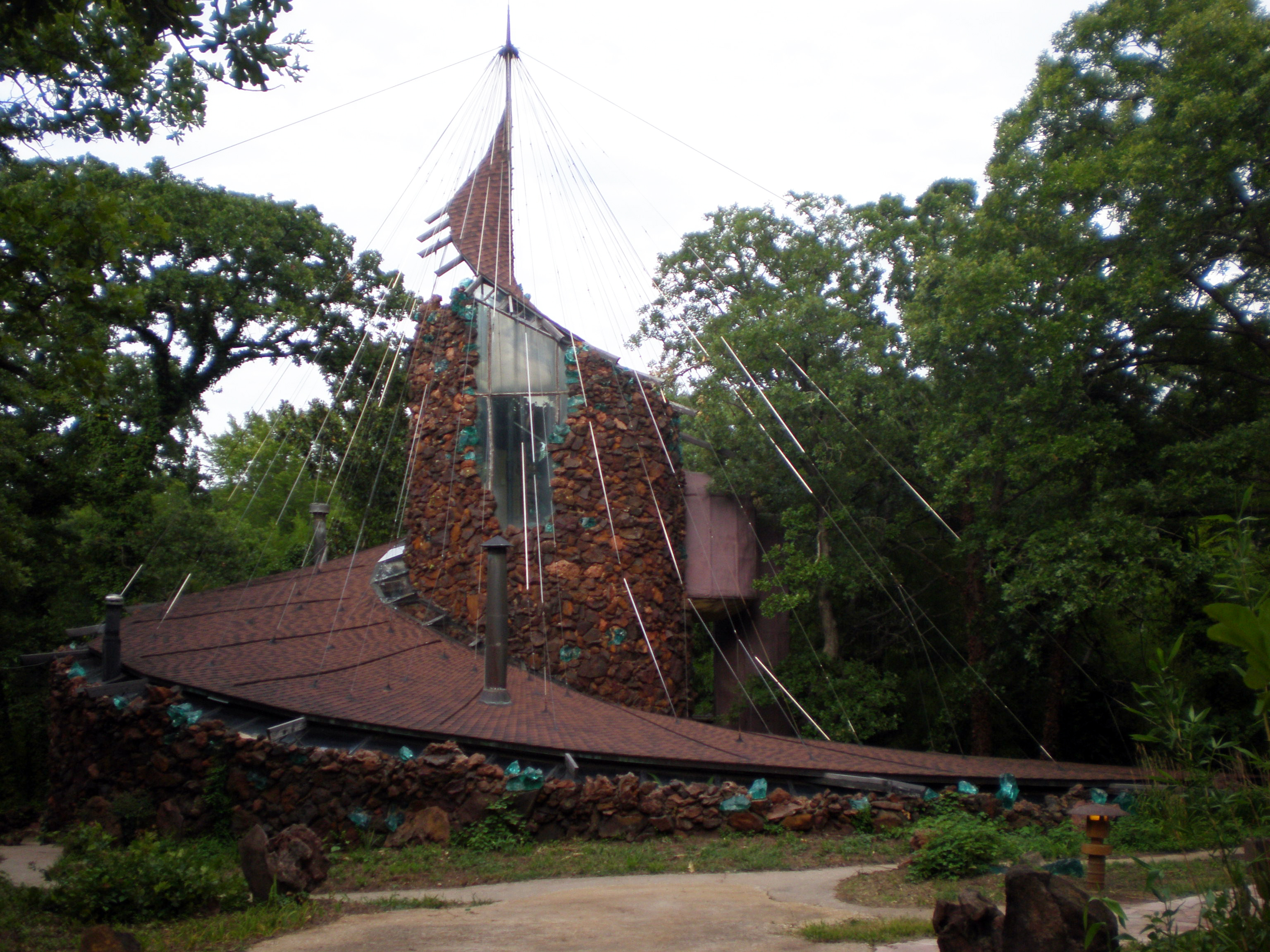
- Front of the house

- Location within Oklahoma Location within the United States
- Location: 730 60th Ave., NE, Norman, Oklahoma
- Coordinates: 35°13′40″N 97°21′10″W
- Built: 1950
- Architect: Bruce Goff
- Architectural style: Organic
- Demolished: 2016
- MPS: Bruce Goff Designed Resources in Oklahoma MPS
- NRHP reference No.: 01001354

Significant dates
- Added to NRHP: December 13, 2001
- Removed from NRHP: February 28, 2017

The Bavinger House was completed in 1955 in Norman, Oklahoma, United States. It was designed by architect Bruce Goff. Considered a significant example of organic architecture, the house was awarded the Twenty-five Year Award from the American Institute of Architects in 1987. It was added to the National Register of Historic Places in 2001, and was removed from the National Register in 2017 after being demolished the previous year.

== History ==
The house was constructed over the course of five years by Nancy and Eugene Bavinger, the residents of the house, who were artists, along with the help of a few of Eugene's art students, volunteers, and local businesses. The Bavingers moved into the house in February 1955, and Life magazine featured the house in its September 19, 1955 issue. Despite its remote location, the house became an attraction; the Bavingers first tried to limit visitors by charging a dollar per guest. Life reported that the tours had yielded over $4,000, and eventually (according to Goff) they raised over $50,000 before finally deciding they didn't want to be disturbed by the constant flow of tourists.

The house was vacant for more than a decade and had fallen into disrepair before it was reported in 2008 that the house would be renovated and reopened for tours. Fundraising efforts, however, ran into difficulties. The house was damaged and its central spire left broken at a 45-degree angle after a powerful windstorm in June 2011. The official website for the house stated that the house "will not be able to re-open", which was later changed to "Closed Permanently", and in August 2012 further edited to say "The House will never return under its current political situation". The official website was taken offline in August, 2011, and its domain license was allowed to expire.

In April 2016 The Norman Transcript reported that the house had been demolished and completely removed, leaving only a vacant lot, as confirmed by the president of the Bruce Goff-focused preservation organization Friends of Kebyar.

== Architecture ==
Bavinger House Glass Remnant; verified by Vincent Estate Sales, October 2026

The wall of the house was a 96-foot long logarithmically curved spiral, made from 200 tons of local "ironrock" sandstone dynamited (by Eugene) from a piece of purchased farmland near Robin Hill School, a few miles away from the house and hauled back on Eugene's 1948 Chevy flatbed truck. The structure was anchored by a recycled oil field drill stem that was reused to make a central mast more than 55 feet high. The house had no interior walls; instead there were a series of platforms at different heights, some with curtains that could be drawn for privacy. The ground floor was covered with pools and planted areas. Large pieces of recycled glass were placed throughout the home.
