= Bart Prince =

American architect (born 1947)

- Born: June 24, 1947 (age 79); New Mexico, U.S.
- Education: Highland High School; Arizona State University
- Occupation: Architect
- Relatives: L. Bradford Prince (great-grandfather)

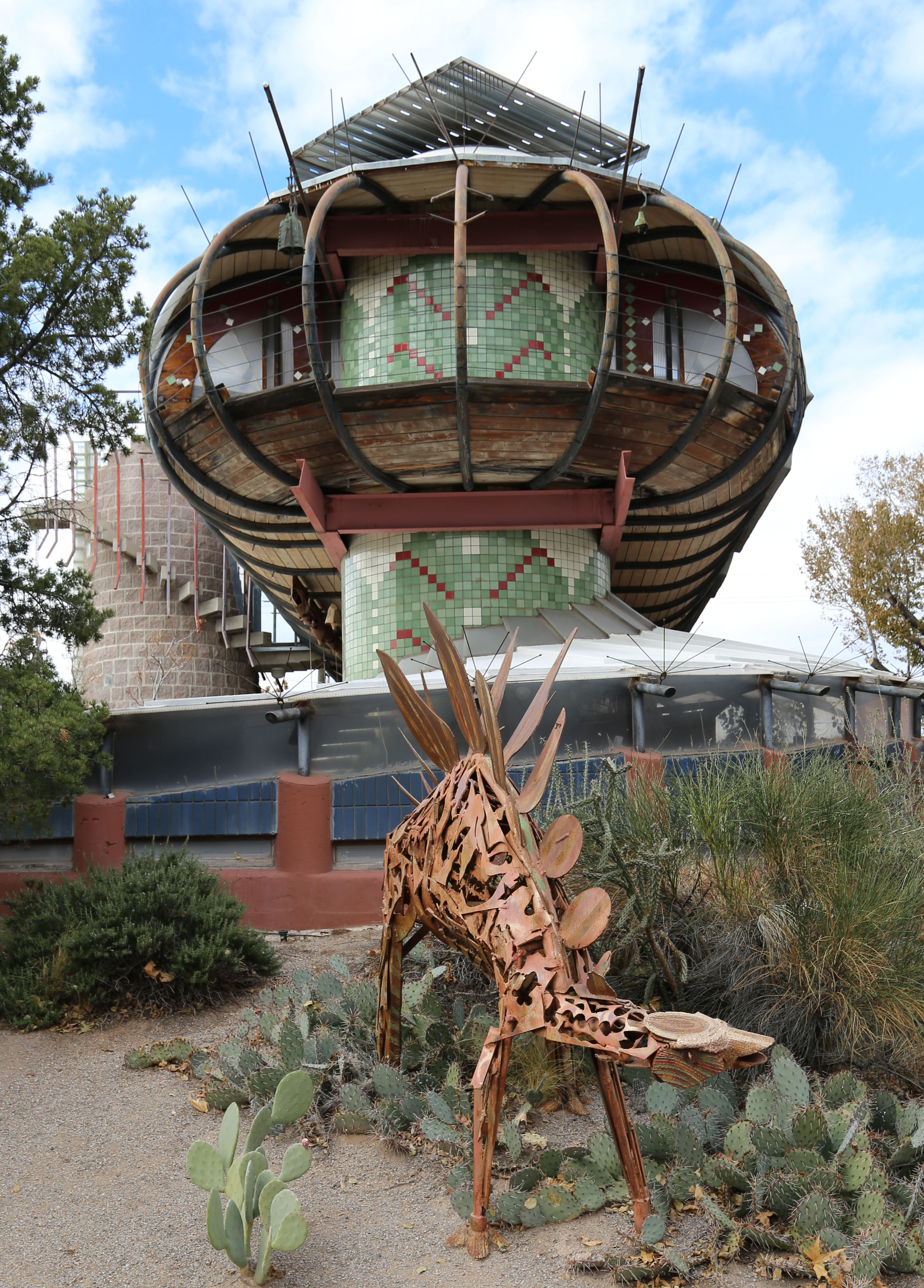
Bart Prince Home and Studio (1984)

Bart Prince (born June 24, 1947) is an American architect based in Albuquerque, New Mexico. He is best known for his highly organic style of architecture.

== Biography ==
Prince was born in New Mexico and is a graduate of Highland High School and Arizona State University. He opened his own practice in Albuquerque in 1973. He counts as his architectural inspirations: Frank Lloyd Wright, Antoni Gaudi, and Bruce Goff, the latter to whom Prince was a former student and assistant. He accounts the inspiration for his individual creativity to Claude Debussy and Pablo Picasso.

Prince worked closely with Bruce Goff when they were associate architects on the Pavilion for Japanese Art in Los Angeles from 1978 to 1988.

Prince's great-grandfather was L. Bradford Prince, the governor of New Mexico Territory from 1889 to 1893.

His home and studio in Albuquerque reflect his distinct style.

== Selected works ==
The following is a selection of works by Prince that best exemplify his style:

- 1982: Dale and Margo Seymour Residence, Los Altos, California
- 1984: Bart Prince Residence and Studio, Albuquerque, New Mexico
- 1988: Pavilion for Japanese Art at the Los Angeles County Museum of Art (with Bruce Goff), Los Angeles, California
- 1988: Bradford Prince Residence, Albuquerque, New Mexico
- 1989: Joe and Etsuko Price Residence (and an addition in 1996), Corona del Mar, California
- 1991: Henry Whiting Residence, near Sun Valley, Idaho
- 1991: Judy and Stuart Spence Residence, South Pasadena, California
- 1993: George Gradow / Barbi Benton Residence, Aspen, Colorado
- 1993: Boyd and Mary Kay Hight Residence, near Mendocino, California
- 1993: Christopher Mead / Michele Penhall Residence, Albuquerque, New Mexico
- 1998: Borden / Wiegner Residence, Jemez Springs, New Mexico
- 1999: Steve Skilken Residence, Columbus, Ohio
- 2002: Fu Residence, Rio Rancho, New Mexico
- 2004: Parsifal Townhomes, Albuquerque, New Mexico
- 2004: Whitmore Residence, Glorieta, New Mexico
- 2005: Dan Scherger and Suzanne Kolberg Residence, Albuquerque, New Mexico
