= John Frank House =

Historic house in Oklahoma, United States

- U.S. National Register of Historic Places
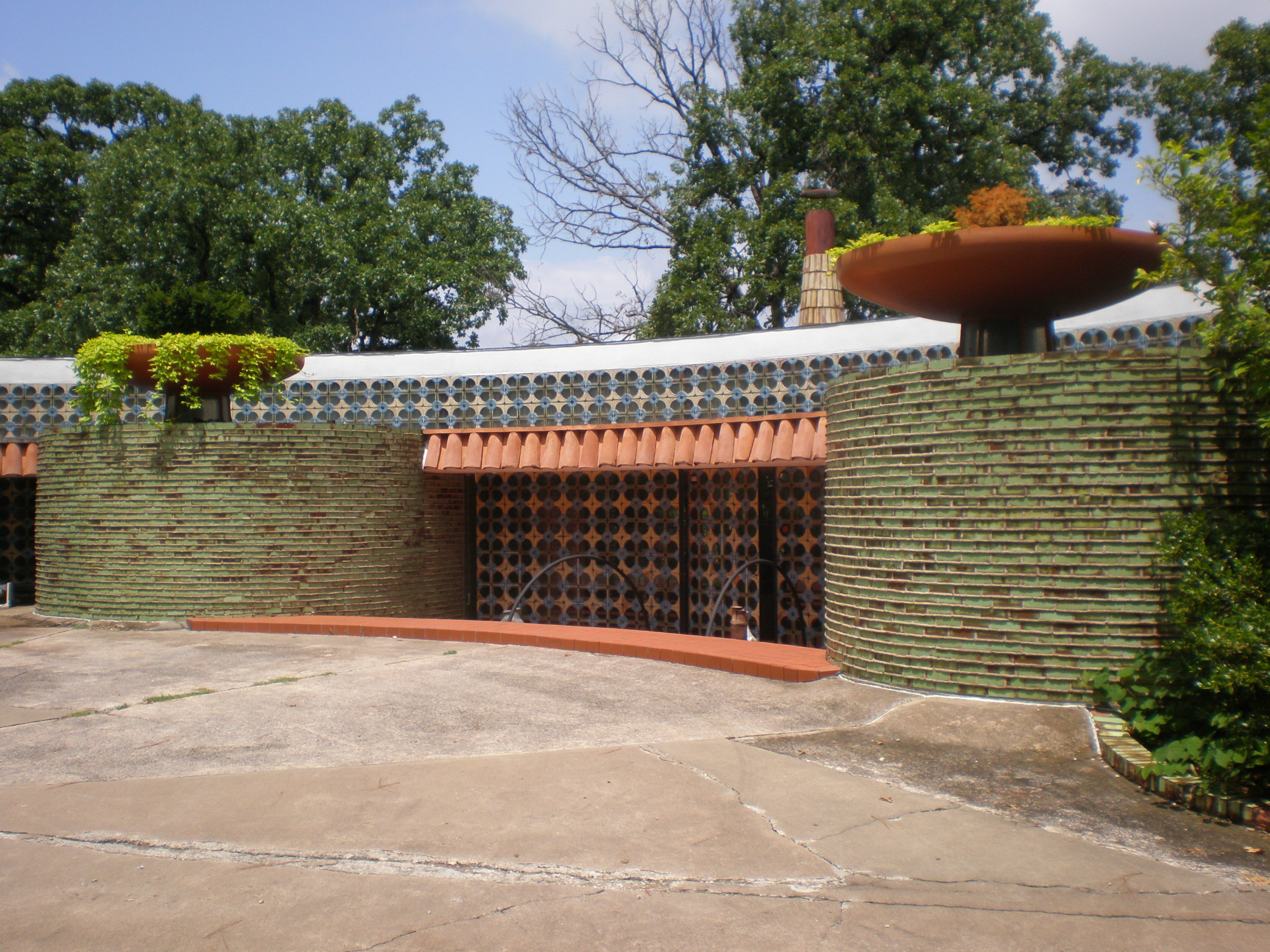
- Back of the house

- Location within Oklahoma Location within the United States
- Location: 1300 Luker Lane, Sapulpa, Oklahoma
- Coordinates: 35.985985°N 96.091914°W
- Area: less than one acre
- Built: 1955
- Architect: Bruce Goff
- Architectural style: Organic
- MPS: Bruce Goff Designed Resources in Oklahoma MPS
- NRHP reference No.: 02000221
- Added to NRHP: March 20, 2002

The John Frank House was designed in 1955 and built in 1956 in Sapulpa, Oklahoma, United States. It was designed by architect Bruce Goff. It was designed for John Frank, founder of Frankoma Pottery. It was specifically designed to showcase the Franks' love for pottery. John and Grace Lee Frank glazed and fired the ceramic tiles located throughout the house.

The home is listed on the National Register of Historic Places. .
