= Pavilion for Japanese Art =

Part of the Los Angeles County Museum of Art

Coordinates: 34°03′48″N 118°21′29″W

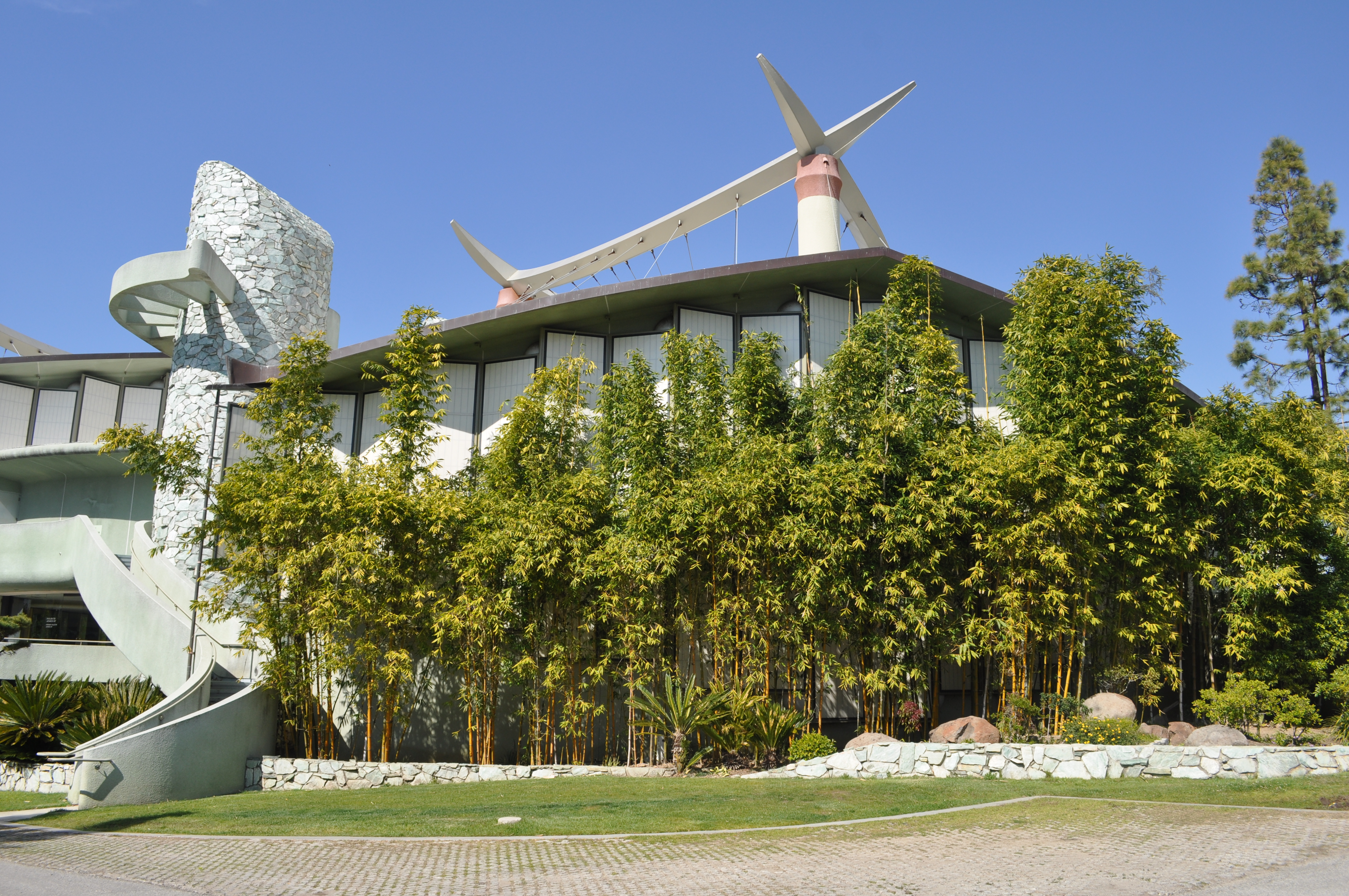
- Pavilion for Japanese Art at the Los Angeles County Museum of Art
- Interactive map of the Pavilion for Japanese Art area

General information
- Type: Art Museum
- Architectural style: Expressionism, New Modernism
- Location: Los Angeles
- Construction started: 1978
- Completed: 1988

Design and construction
- Architect: Bruce Goff (completed by Bart Prince after Goff's death)

The Pavilion for Japanese Art is a part of the Los Angeles County Museum of Art containing the museum's collection of Japanese works that date from approximately 3000 BC through the 20th century AD. The building itself was designed by renowned architect Bruce Goff.

== Collections ==
Archaeological artifacts, Buddhist and Shinto sculpture, ceramics, lacquerware, textiles, cloisonné, and armor are on display on the second level of the Pavilion's West Wing. The Helen and Felix Juda Gallery, also on the second level, is primarily reserved for Japanese prints displayed in rotating exhibits. The museum's collection includes traditional woodblock prints from the Edo period (1615–1868), as well as a large number of prints from the Meiji period (1868–1912), Taishō period (1912–1926), and the Shōwa period (1926–1989). Print exhibitions change every three months and are based on periods, themes, or styles.

The exhibition space in the Pavilion's East Wing displays a rotating selection of screens and hanging scrolls from the Edo period, including works from the Rimpa, ukiyo-e, and Maruyama-Shijo schools as well as spontaneous creations made by Zen monks. Works of art are exhibited on six levels within the East Wing.

The plaza level contains the Raymond and Frances Bushell Netsuke Gallery, which holds an encyclopedic array of 827 works from the 17th through the 20th century. This gallery provides visitors with a 360-degree view of the miniature sculptures known as netsuke. In traditional Japan, netsuke were used as toggles and counterweights for suspending tobacco pouches and inro from the sash of men's kimono.

== Architecture ==
Designed by Bruce Goff, the 32,100-square-foot (2,980 m^{2}) building is notable for its translucent fiberglass panels, which allow paintings to be lit safely and naturally by soft sunlight. The effect approximates the original viewing conditions for these paintings and allows gold leaf to reflect, creating dimensional levels within works of art not visible under artificial lighting. Japanese screens can be viewed at a distance, while scrolls can be viewed closer in alcove-like settings that suggest the tokonoma viewing area in a Japanese home. The pavilion also features a prow-shaped roof and cylindrical towers. The architectural landscape was designed by the firm of Hannah Olin.

== History ==
Collector Joe D. Price's Shin'enkan Collection of more than 300 Japanese scroll and screen paintings represents the core of the Los Angeles County Museum of Art's Japanese holdings. In 1983, Price and his wife Etsuko Yoshimochi bequeathed about 300 Japanese screens and scrolls to the museum and donated $5 million in seed money for a building to house them. In 1987, Price also joined LACMA's board of trustees. The museum, in turn, agreed to maintain and exhibit the collection and to raise up to $2 million in additional funds to build the pavilion. The museum actually raised $7.5 million for the project, in addition to the Prices' gift. Before entering the embrace of LACMA, the pavilion was first designed to be built in Bartlesville, Oklahoma, where Price had assembled his extensive collection, and then was later redesigned as a wing of the Metropolitan Museum of Art in New York. Goff's original design was translated into working drawings for LACMA by his former associate, Bart Prince. Price provided $5 million toward the pavilion's construction costs. Total construction costs were $13-million.

The Pavilion for Japanese Art is scheduled for renovation as part of the redesign of the LACMA campus by architect Peter Zumthor.

== Photo gallery ==
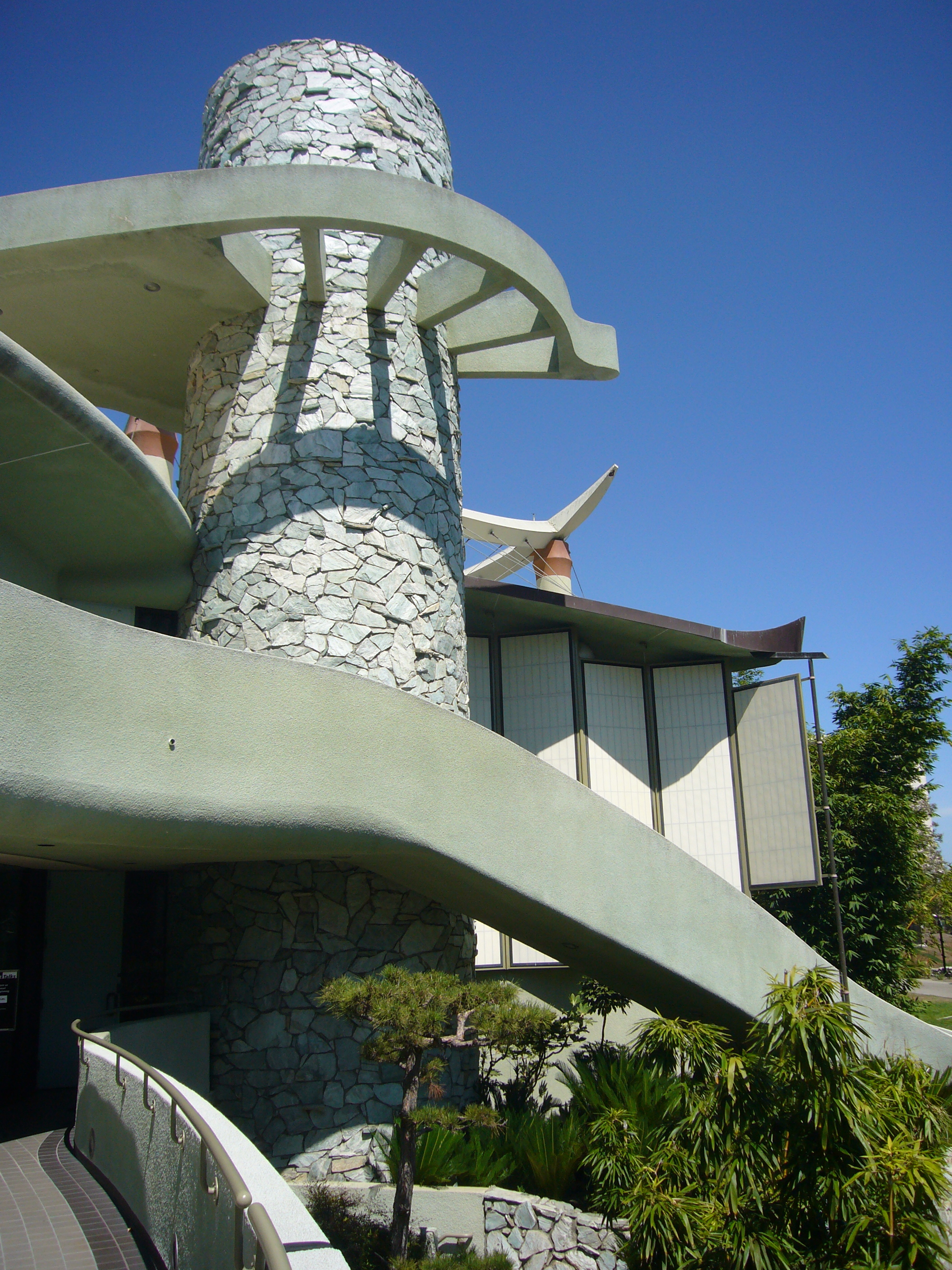
Entrance to the Pavilion

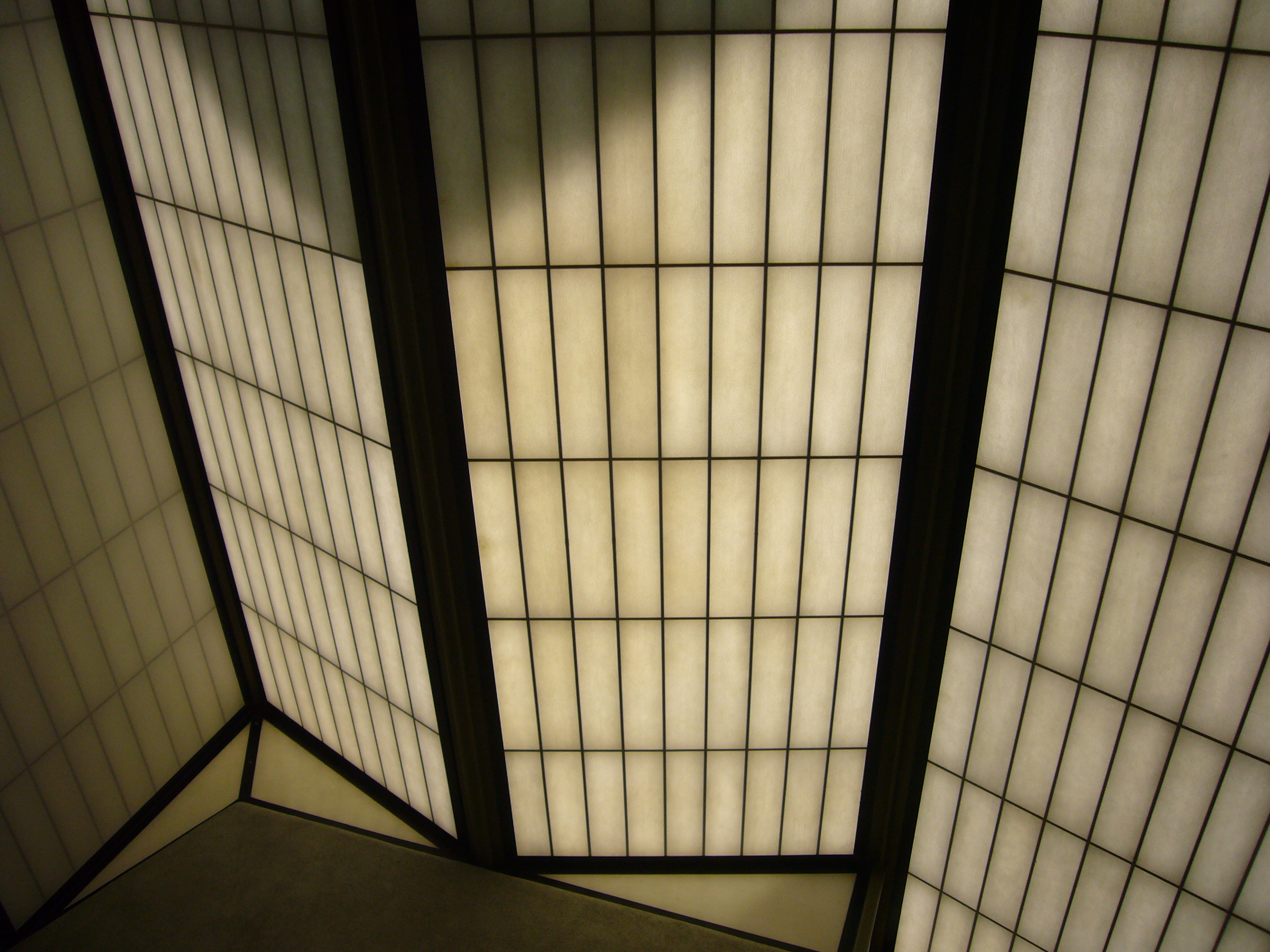
The Pavilion's translucent panels

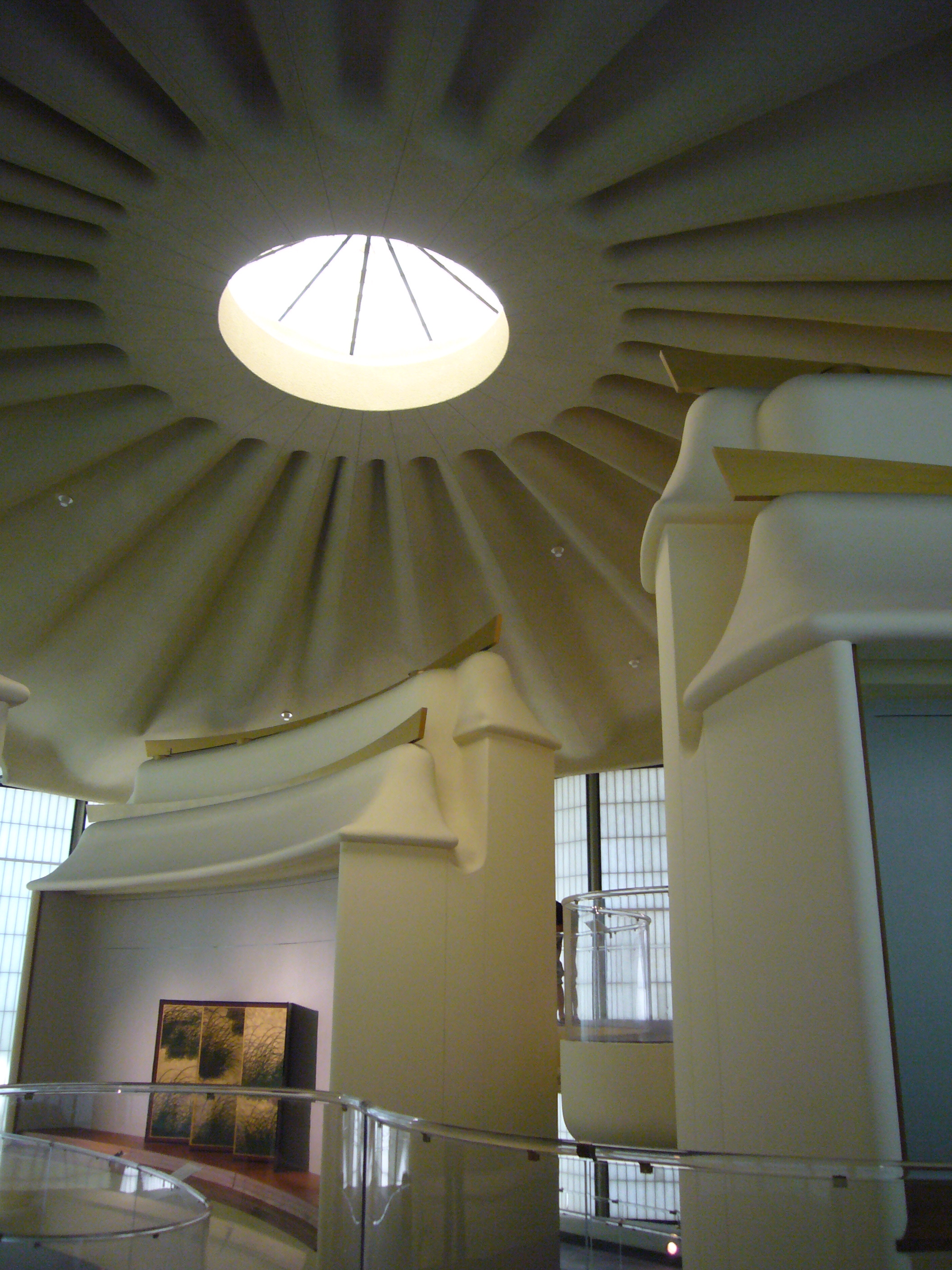
East Wing

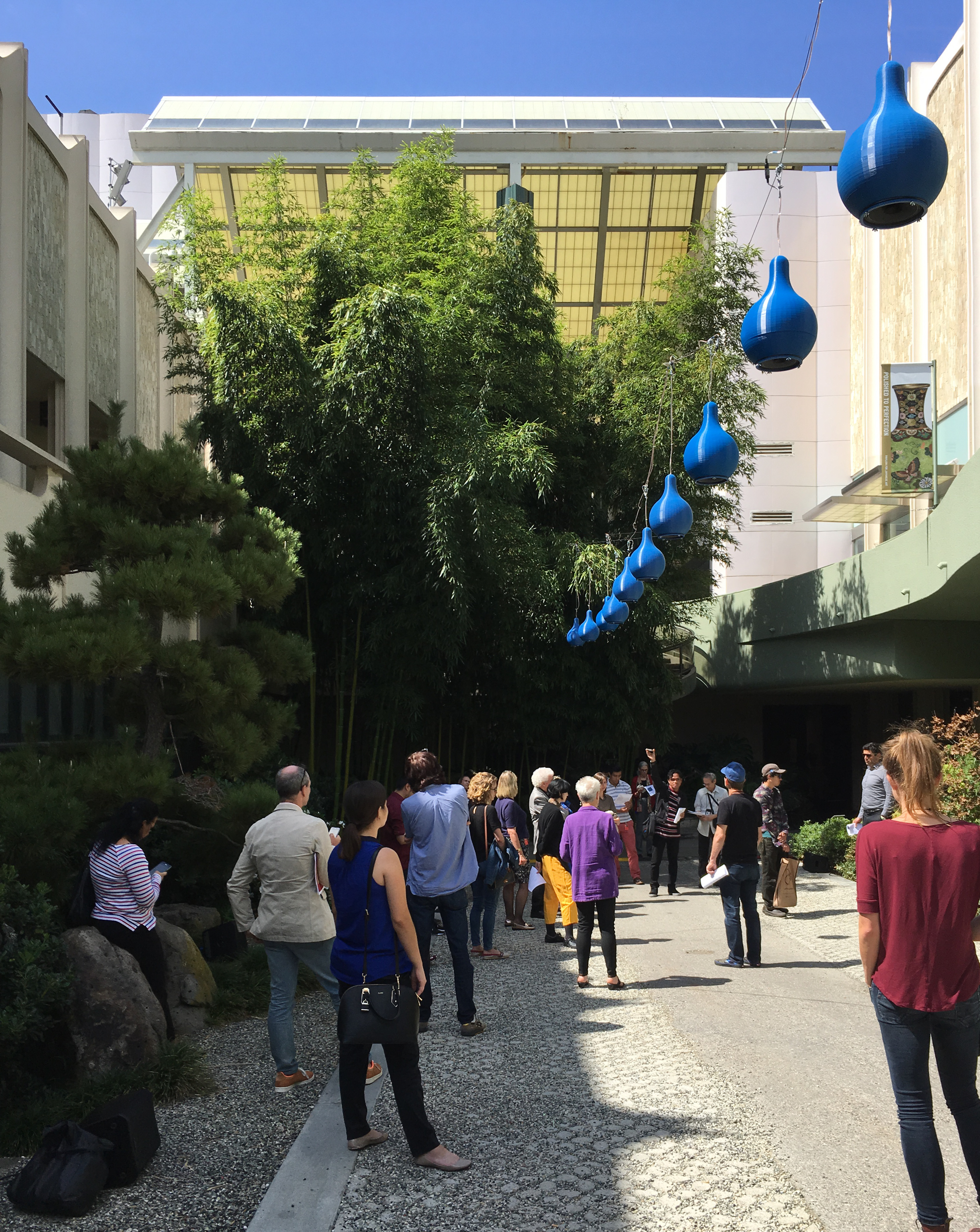
The installation artwork Signal Tide being presented in front of the Japanese Pavilion in September 2017
