= Ledbetter House =

Historic house in Oklahoma, United States

- H.E. Ledbetter House
- U.S. National Register of Historic Places
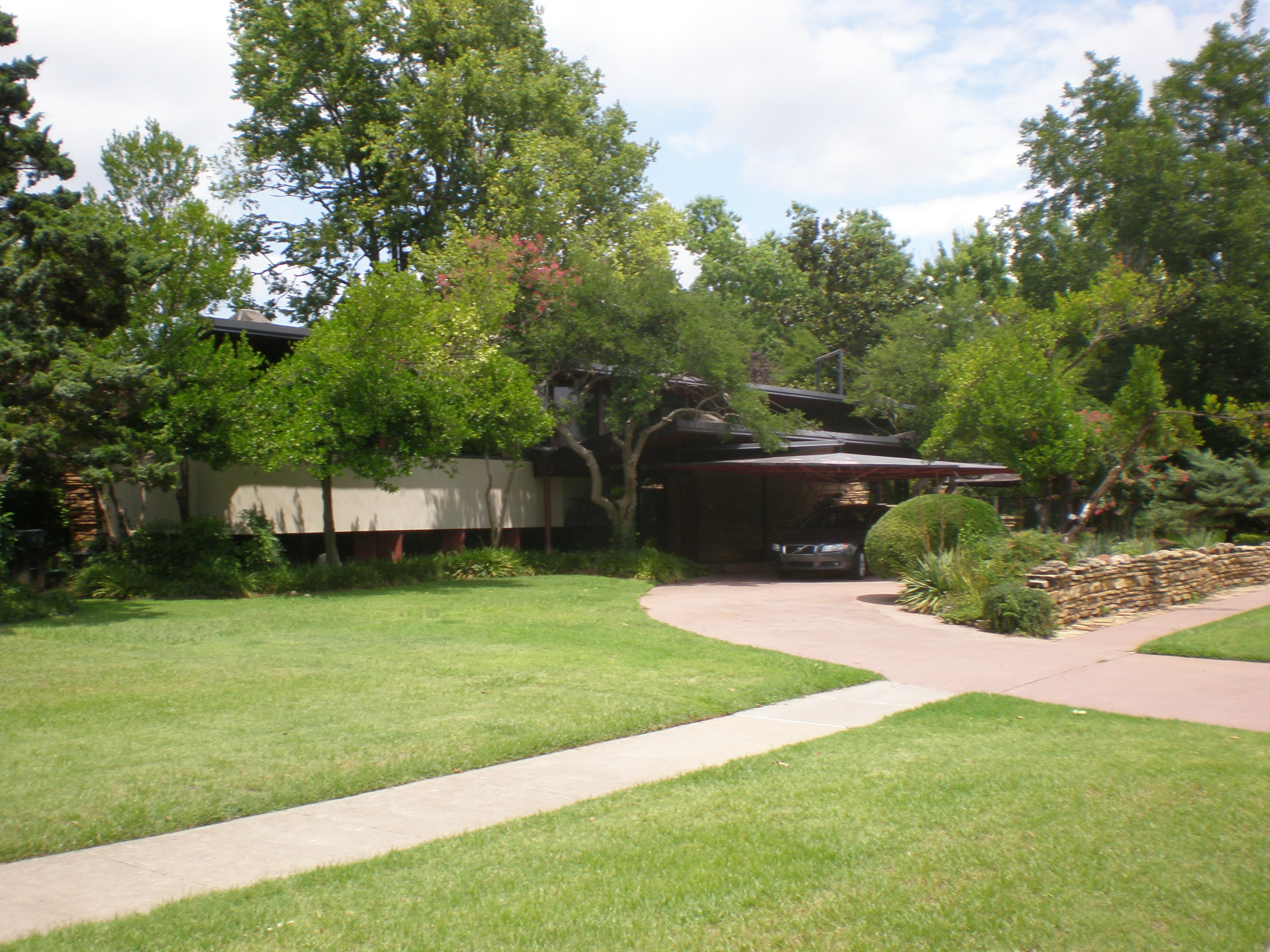
- Front of the house

- Location within Oklahoma Location within the United States
- Location: 701 W. Brooks, Norman, Oklahoma
- Coordinates: 35°12′27″N 97°27′4″W
- Area: less than one acre
- Built: 1948
- Architect: Bruce Goff; Barbour and Short Construction Co.
- Architectural style: Organic
- MPS: Bruce Goff Designed Resources in Oklahoma MPS
- NRHP reference No.: 01000655
- Added to NRHP: June 14, 2001

The Ledbetter House (also known as the Ledbetter/Taylor House) is a historic house located at 701 West Brooks in Norman, Oklahoma, United States.

== Description ==
It was built in 1948, and was designed by architect Bruce Goff. The distinguishing features of the house are its suspended carport and patio roofs. The Ledbetter House is owned by the University of Oklahoma and is now a private residence. In 2001, it was one of several Goff-designed buildings recognized by placement on the National Register of Historic Places.
