= Sam and Ruth VanSickle Ford House =

Historic house in Illinois, United States

- Sam and Ruth Van Sickle Ford House
- U.S. National Register of Historic Places
- U.S. National Historic Landmark
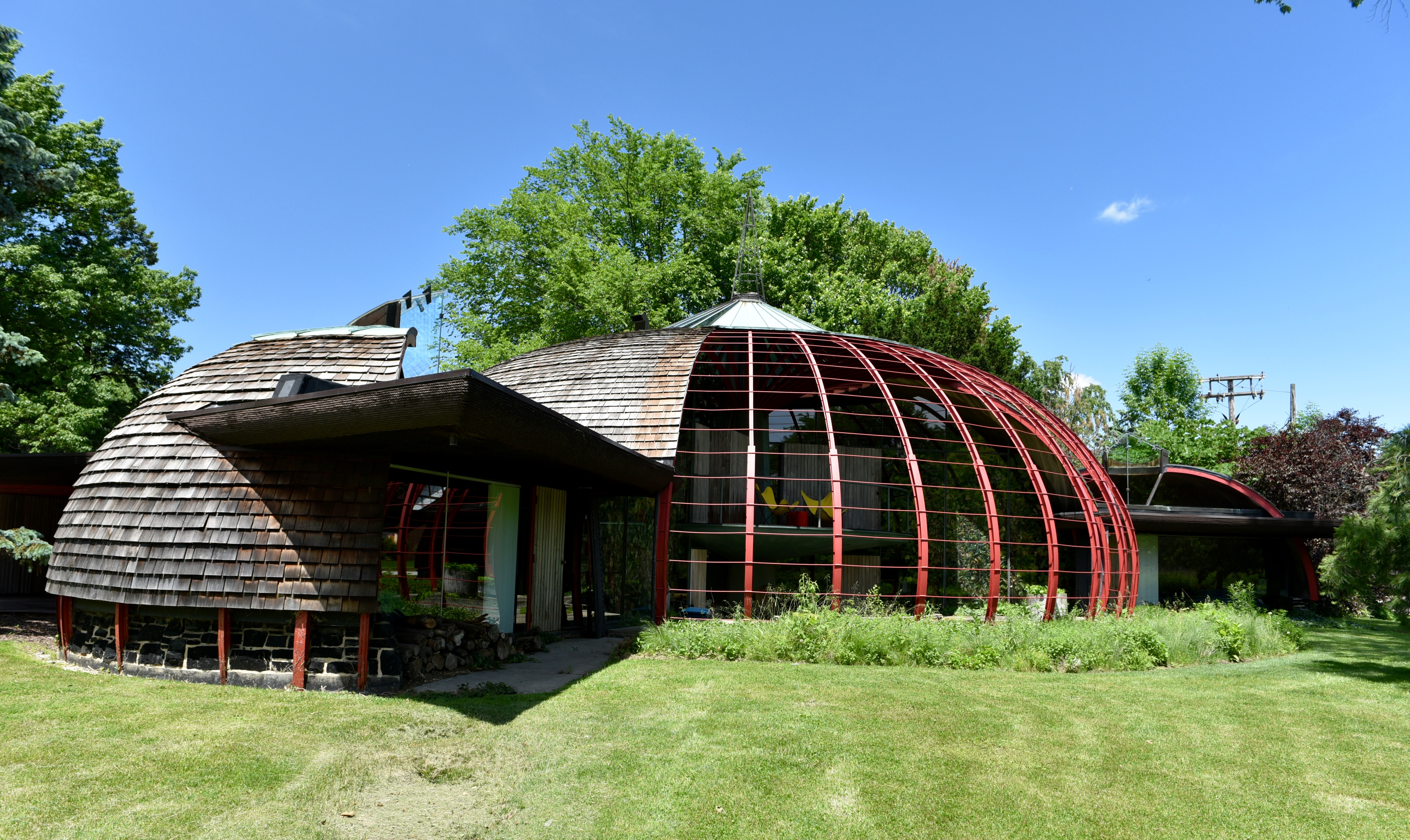

- Location within Illinois Location within the United States
- Location: 404 S. Edgelawn Dr., Aurora, Illinois
- Coordinates: 41°45′12″N 88°21′33″W
- Built: 1949-50
- Built by: Don Tosi
- Architect: Bruce Goff
- Architectural style: Organic
- NRHP reference No.: 16000056

Significant dates
- Added to NRHP: March 8, 2016
- Designated NHL: December 11, 2023

The Sam and Ruth Van Sickle Ford House is a historic house located at 404 S. Edgelawn Drive in Aurora, Illinois. The house was built at a cost of $64,000 in 1949–50 for painter and art teacher Ruth Van Sickle Ford and her husband, civil engineer Sam Ford. Architect Bruce Goff, an influential figure in the organic movement, designed the house. The house is dome-shaped, with Quonset hut ribs forming the frame of the dome. Most of the dome is covered in shingles; however, the southeast side of the dome was left open to give the house outdoor rooms. Two smaller domes containing the home's bedrooms abut the south and northeast sides of the main dome.

The house was added to the National Register of Historic Places on March 8, 2016, and was designated a National Historic Landmark in 2023 for its architecture. It remains privately owned.
