= Glen Mitchell House =

House in Dodge City, Kansas, United States

Coordinates: 37.7688°N 100.029992°W

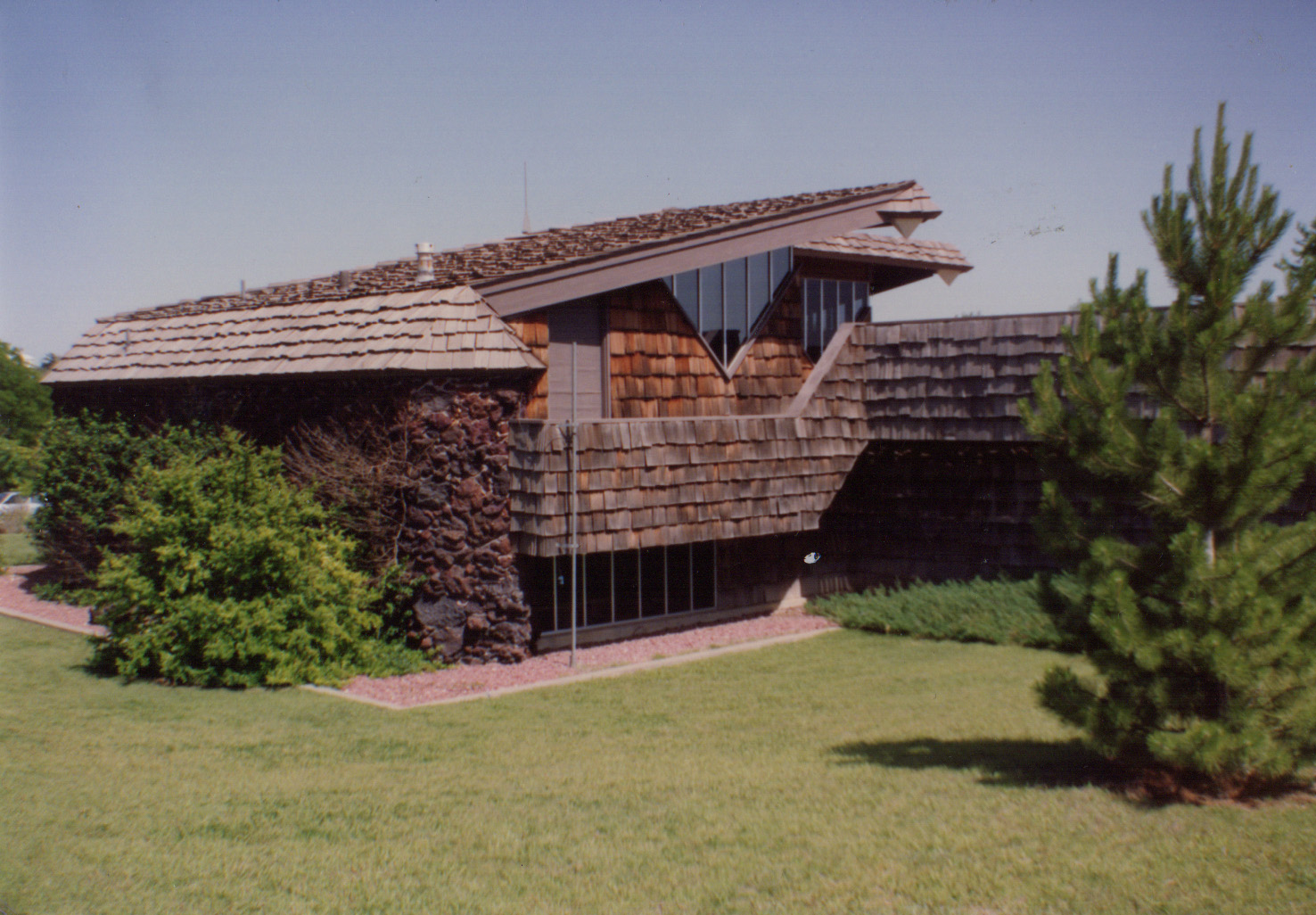
Exterior photo of the Mitchell house in Dodge City, Kansas by Bruce Goff.

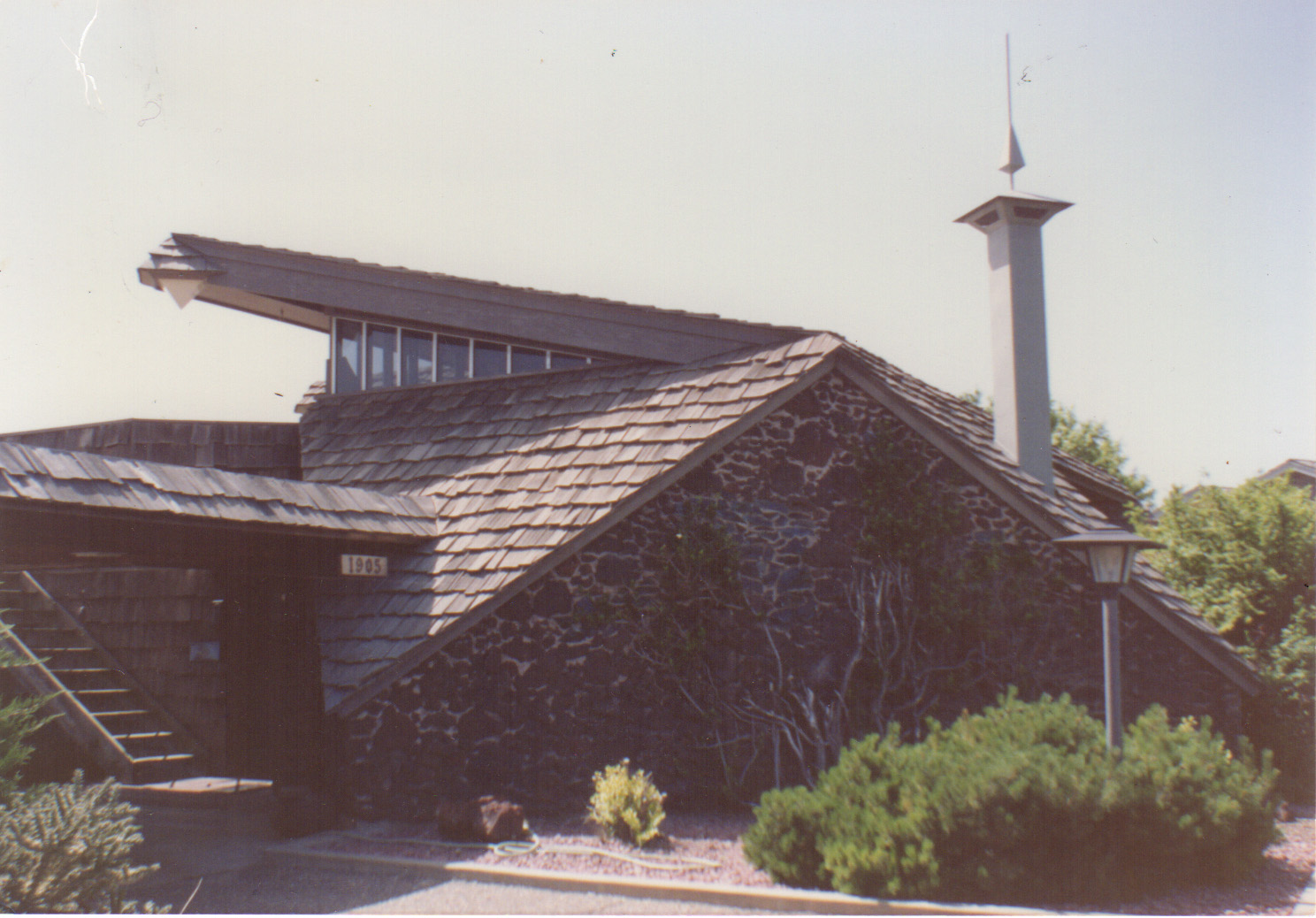
Exterior image showing tower and "swooping" roof

The Glen Mitchell House, also known as Mitchell House, was a unique design in Dodge City at the time it was built, as it was modeled using Asian influences which were considerably different from the surrounding conventionally styled homes. The home in the Organic Architecture style was designed by architect Bruce Goff when Goff was practicing architecture in Kansas from 1964–1968 and built by Don Stein and Leo Jantz both of Dodge City, Kansas, United States. The house located at 1905 Burr Parkway, Dodge City, Kansas was designed in 1968 for Dr. Glen Mitchell, a practicing dentist and accomplished musician, and with the use of colors, textures and natural materials and landscaping the architect achieved a home that was in "harmony with its landscape".

The Glen Mitchell house has angular geometry and a large sloping wood shingle roof. Bruce Wrightsman, an architect of the Kansas State Historical Society, wrote that Goff's houses often had "large overhangs with thin eaves set over a large expanse of glass, giving the roof a sense of lightness," and noted that the Mitchell House's roof in particular "swooped upward, giving the roof the sense of flight as it floated over clerestory glass bringing in natural light to the open space." He also commented that colored glass is incorporated in the walls to create unique lighting characteristics and strengthen the organic expression of the home.

Professor Arn Henderson, of the University of Oklahoma, found Goff to be " an American genius" in a 2000 review of his works. But Henderson considered the Glen Mitchell House in Kansas to be "uninspired", and complained that the house "with a monochromatic cladding of wood shakes lacked both delicacy and the visual contrast that characterized much of his work." However, on reading Goff speak of his own theories of Music and Architecture in the Philip Welch edited collection of Goff's conversations and lectures one could surmise that this is a classic example of an architectural composition on a unique site with music as its inspiration and the monochromatic characteristics are part of the unique composition on a unique site.
