= Turzak House =

House in Chicago, Illinois, United States

Coordinates: 42.0096°N 87.8134°W

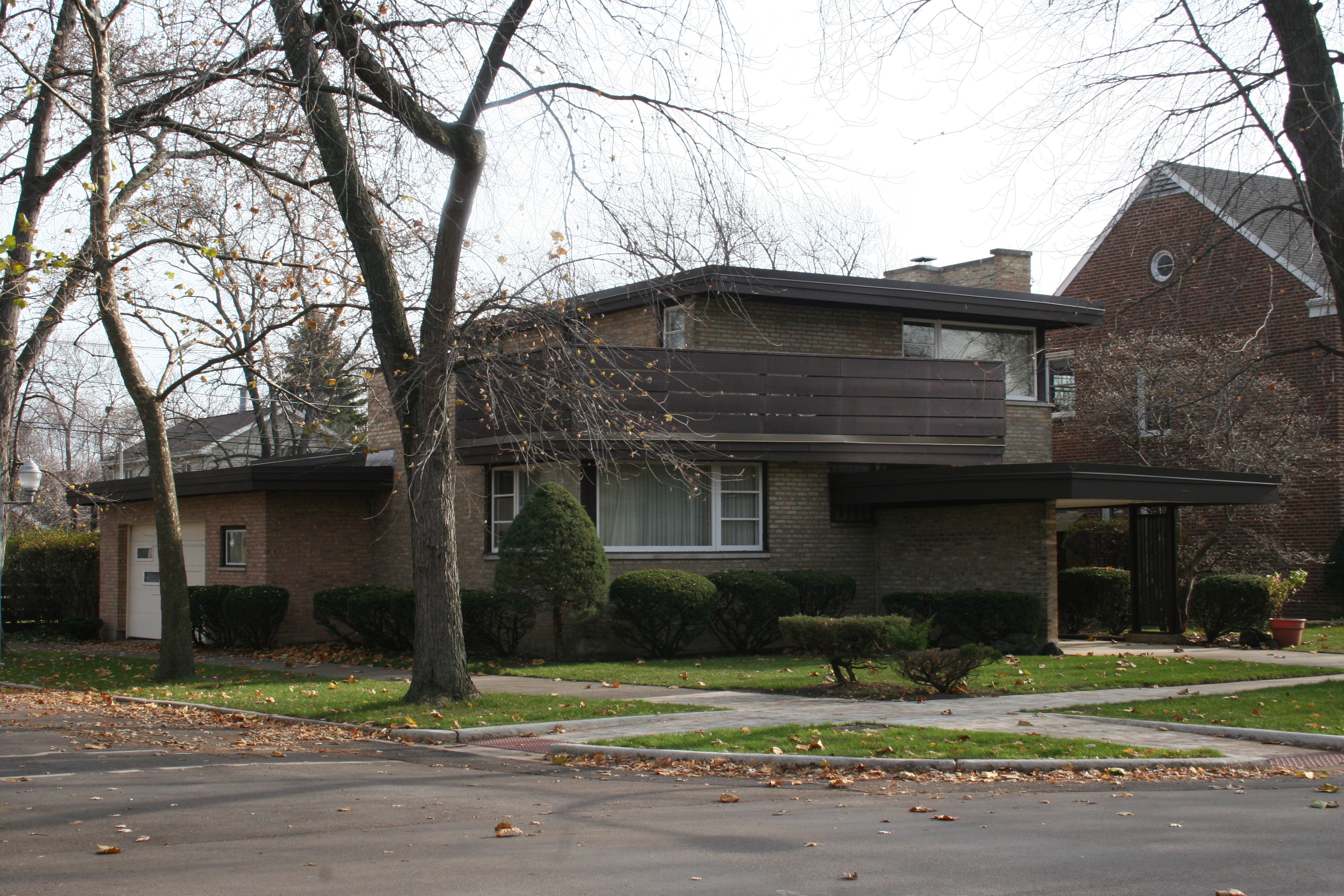
- Interactive map of the Turzak House area

General information
- Location: 7059 North Olcott Avenue, Chicago, Illinois,

The Turzak House is a house located at 7059 North Olcott Avenue in Chicago, Illinois, United States. The house was built between 1938 and 1939 by Bruce Goff for Charles Turzak. It was designated a Chicago Landmark on December 9, 1992.
