= Glenn Mitchell (talk radio broadcaster) =

Glenn Mitchell (September 28, 1950 – November 20, 2005) was a radio personality from Dallas, Texas.

Mitchell (who insisted that the only correct way to spell the name "Glenn" was with two "n"s) was born in Springfield, Missouri. He hosted a two-hour weekday talk show, The Glenn Mitchell Show, from 12 to 2 p.m. CST on NPR-member public radio station KERA 90.1 from 1995 to 2005.

Mitchell interviewed a wide variety of guests on an even wider variety of subjects, showing a thirst for knowledge and an unusual skill at making his audience a part of the conversation. Shortly before his death he was praised by guest Mike Wallace, the CBS veteran reporter. Wallace noted that Mitchell was well known for being an extraordinary interviewer. Mitchell responded modestly, calling himself "the man who did his homework."

The popular "Anything You Ever Wanted to Know" edition of the show aired during the first hour every Friday with the tag line "All Questions Answered. All Knowledge Revealed." Listeners called or emailed questions and answers to those questions every Friday, making it an interactive radio program for the audience. Occasionally, Mitchell would broadcast live from the Dallas Public Library. The librarians, or "professional smart people" as he referred to them, would help answer questions from callers.

Mitchell won 19 Katie Awards from the Dallas Press Club, four of which were for best interview/talk show, and was recognized by the Dallas Observer's "Best of Dallas" awards. In 2006, Mitchell was inducted into the Texas Radio Hall of Fame and was honored posthumously by the Dallas Press Club with the Buck Marryatt Award for lifetime achievement.

Mitchell also was known for the annual "Christmas Blockbuster" program, a 12-hour marathon of Christmas music, trivia, spoken word, and quizzes which ran for 30 years. A shorter version of the "Christmas Blockbuster" aired on national NPR as the "Christmas Stocking."

The Glenn Mitchell Show had been slated to begin airing nationally on XM Satellite Radio in February 2006.

At age 37, he underwent aortic valve replacement surgery to correct an anomaly in the valve, thought to be the result of a birth defect. His death has been attributed to heart failure.
