= Bruce Goff =

American architect (1904–1982)

- Born: Bruce Alonzo Goff; June 8, 1904; Alton, Kansas, US
- Died: August 4, 1982 (aged 78); Tyler, Texas, US
- Occupation: Architect
- Awards: AIA Twenty-five Year Award (1987)
- Practice: Tulsa, Oklahoma; Chicago, Illinois; Norman, Oklahoma; Bartlesville, OK
- Buildings: Bachman House; Bavinger House; Ruth VanSickle Ford House; Ledbetter House; Pavilion for Japanese Art; Glen Mitchell House

Bruce Alonzo Goff (June 8, 1904 – August 4, 1982) was an American architect, distinguished by his organic, eclectic, and often flamboyant designs for houses and other buildings in Oklahoma and elsewhere.

A 1951 Life magazine article stated that Goff was "one of the few US architects whom Frank Lloyd Wright considers creative...scorns houses that are ‘boxes with little holes."

== Early years ==
Bruce Goff's father, Corliss, was the youngest of seven children born to a builder in Cameron, Missouri, who learned to be a watch repairman at an early age, and moved to Wakeeney, Kansas, where he opened his own watch repair business. He married a young schoolteacher in 1903 at the home of her parents in Ellis, Kansas. Soon after marriage, they moved to the farm town of Alton, Kansas, where their son Bruce was born on June 8, 1904.

Life was very difficult for the Goffs in Alton, so they moved south to Indian Territory and lived on land that would become Tulsa, Oklahoma. At the end of the first summer, they moved to Henrietta, where Goff's sister was born in 1906. Then they moved to Skiatook and Hominy, where he saw the Indians in ceremonial dress, and was very impressed with their patterns and color. He started school in Skiatook, where he was fascinated by a picture of the Mormon Temple in Salt Lake City, his first real exposure to architecture other than frontier structures. Later, after moving to Hominy, he began drawing fanciful pictures of such buildings on wrapping paper. (Note: Bruce's mother later said, "...he drew castles and fanciful cathedrals almost before he could even write.")

Goff's family decided in 1913 to relocate to Denver, Colorado, where the father expected that his fortunes would change for the better. First, Corliss went ahead of the mother and children who stayed with her relatives in Ellis, Kansas. He bought a watch shop and opened for business. Meanwhile Bruce, displaying the talent of an artistic prodigy, learned to paint from nature. (Note: Bruce was taught by his great-grandmother, who was a self-taught painter. His grandmother was a self-taught landscape painter, a technique he would return to later in life.) At the end of the summer of 1913, Corliss sent for the family to join him in Denver. The economy did not favor his efforts, and Bruce later remembered going to bed hungry many nights, because his father could not afford enough food for the family. After a year and a half of constant struggle, Corliss realized that his fortunes were not going to change there.

Goff's parents decided to move back to Tulsa in 1915. Corliss had given up on the watchmaking business and became a grocery equipment salesman. Bruce was largely self-educated and displayed a great talent for drawing. He enrolled in the sixth grade at Lincoln Elementary School, where his first art teacher, a Miss Brown, strongly supported his individualistic artistic expression. (Note: He found the same kind of supportive teacher when he enrolled at Tulsa's Central High School a few years later.) His father apprenticed him at age 12 to the Tulsa architectural firm of Rush, Endacott and Rush. (Note: Legend says that Bruce's father, accompanied by his son, had simply asked a taxicab driver for the name of the best architect in town. The driver took them to the Rush, Endacott and Rush office. After showing the child's drawings to the three principals, Corliss essentially challenged them to take the boy on as an apprentice and make an architect out of him. The senior partner, A. W. Rush, recognized Bruce as a prodigy, took the challenge, and made an offer on the spot.) Goff's employers were impressed with his talent; they soon gave him responsibility for designing houses and small commercial projects. One of his earliest designs to be built was a house at 1732 South Yorktown Avenue in Tulsa's Yorktown Historical District; another was the 1920 McGregor House, at 1401 South Quaker Street in what is now the Cherry Street District. This house was added to the National Register of Historic Places in 2014. During this period, his work was heavily influenced through his correspondence with Frank Lloyd Wright and Louis Sullivan, both of whom encouraged him to practice architecture with Rush, Endacott and Rush rather than enroll in the Massachusetts Institute of Technology; they felt that formal education would stifle his creativity. Goff was made a firm partner in 1930. He and his high-school art teacher Adah Robinson are co-credited with the design of Tulsa's Boston Avenue Methodist Church, one of the finest examples of Art Deco architecture in the United States. Goff designed the Tulsa Club Building, downtown Tulsa's historic landmark, in 1927.

== Chicago period ==
In 1934 Goff moved to Chicago, and began teaching part-time at the Academy of Fine Arts. Goff established a private practice in Rogers Park. He designed several Chicago-area residences and went to work for the manufacturer of "Vitrolite", an architectural sheet glass introduced during the 1930s.

== Military experience ==
In March 1942, three months after the Japanese Navy attacked Pearl Harbor, Goff enlisted in the U.S. Navy, Naval Construction Branch ("Seabees"). Called to active duty in July 1942, he underwent basic training, first in Rhode Island and then in Gulfport, Mississippi. After graduating in September, he was promoted to Chief Petty Officer (CPO) and posted to Dutch Harbor, Alaska, where he spent 18 months. His design assignments were strictly conventional (e.g., a club house, a mess hall, an officers' club), and limited by military regulations, availability of materials, cost, and schedules.

In March 1944, Goff was ordered to report to Camp Parks, a naval complex in Dublin, California, east of Oakland, for rehabilitation and reassignment (R & R). A senior officer, Admiral Reeves, who was familiar with Goff's work in Alaska, had Goff assigned to the base operations staff. Goff remained there until he was discharged from the Navy in July 1945.

In 1943, the Marine command had ordered a project to enlarge some service facilities for men stationed there and their civilian visitors (families). The project included remodeling eight existing buildings and constructing the newly approved McCann Memorial Chapel. Captain James Wilson, Chief Engineering Officer of the base, assigned CPO Goff the job of designing all of the projects. He reminded Goff that the same restrictions he had experienced in Alaska would apply here.

The chapel employed two surplus warehouse-type Quonset huts, each 40 feet (12 m) by 100 feet (30 m) and laid end-to-end, as the basic enclosure. A pylon, on which was mounted a two-sided cross, penetrated the hut wall behind the altar. Since the chapel had to be multi-denominational, one side of the cross (designated "Protestant") was unadorned. The reverse side of the cross ("Catholic") was adorned with a crucifix. For Jewish services, the cross could be concealed by the tablets of Moses.

According to Nicolaides, the Camp Parks chapel was purchased in 1956, as surplus military property and rebuilt in San Lorenzo, California. No more has been published about the building.

== Post-war period ==
Goff obtained a teaching position with the School of Architecture at the University of Oklahoma in 1942. (Note: Note:The 1942 date seems highly improbable, since Goff was on active duty in the Aleutian Islands at that time. Another article says that Oklahoma University hired him as a professor in 1947, and made him the department head in 1948.) Despite being largely self-taught, Goff was named chairman of the school in 1943. This was his most productive period. In his private practice, Goff built a large number of residences in the American Midwest, developing his singular style of organic architecture that was client- and site-specific. His former students included Leon Quincy Jackson.

In 1955, Goff, who was gay, became the subject of a smear campaign then common in U.S. colleges and universities. Homosexuality was illegal in Oklahoma and he was accused of "endangering the morals of a minor". Although University of Oklahoma president George Lynn Cross organized a group of OU students and faculty to help defend Goff and encouraged him to fight the charges, Goff resigned. Former students of Goff include Mickey Muennig.

Goff relocated his studio to the Price Tower in Bartlesville, Oklahoma, which had been designed by his mentor Frank Lloyd Wright. There he continued to produce novel designs and also spent considerable time traveling and lecturing. Articles about his ideas and designs appeared frequently in professional magazines, such as Progressive Architecture, Art in America, and Architectural Forum. In 1960–1961 he had Arthur Dyson as an apprentice in his office and from 1958 to 1960 Harvey Ferrero also apprenticed with him.

== Work ==
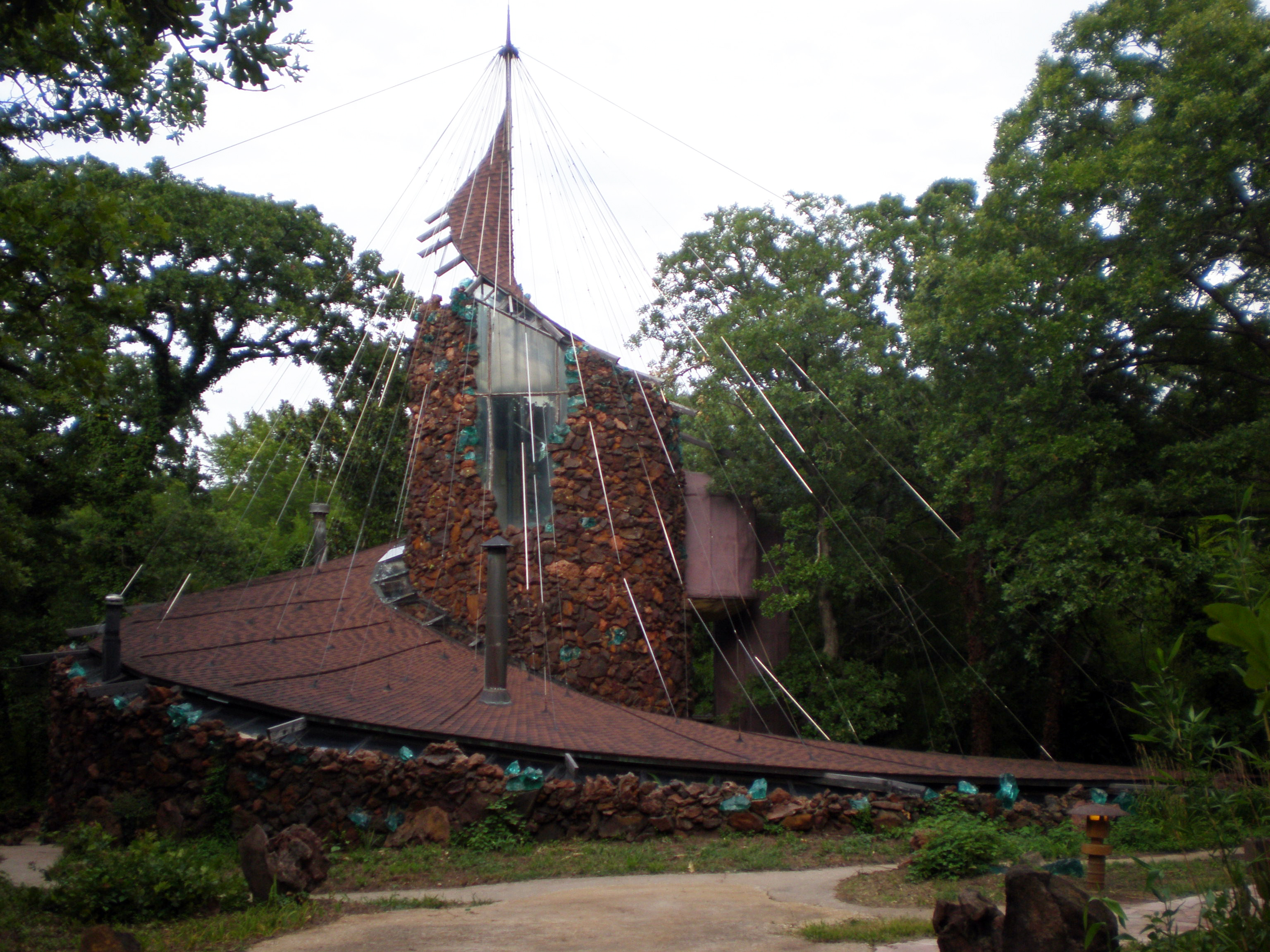
Bavinger House

Goff's accumulated design portfolio of 500 projects (about one quarter of them built) demonstrates a restless, sped-up evolution through conventional styles and forms at a young age, through the Prairie Style of his heroes and correspondents Frank Lloyd Wright and Louis Sullivan, then into original design. Finding inspiration in sources as varied as Antoni Gaudi, Balinese music, Claude Debussy, Japanese ukiyo-e prints, and seashells, Goff's mature work had no precedent and he has few heirs other than his former assistant, New Mexico architect Bart Prince, and former student, Herb Greene. His contemporaries primarily followed tight functionalistic floorplans with flat roofs and no ornament. Goff's idiosyncratic floorplans, attention to spatial effect, and use of recycled and/or unconventional materials such as gilded zebrawood, cellophane strips, cake pans, glass cullet, Quonset Hut ribs, ashtrays, and white turkey feathers, challenge conventional distinctions between order and disorder.

In support of his contention that architecture must remain fresh and vital, Goff declared, "Every time we do a building, it should be the first and the last. We must begin again and again..."

A number of Goff's original designs are on display at the Modern Wing at the Art Institute of Chicago. The Institute exhibited more than 200 of Goff’s works including architectural objects, paintings and ephemera in its Bruce Goff: Material Worlds show that was on display 20 December 2025 – 29 March 2026.

In 2002 director Heinz Emigholz produced the documentary film Goff in the Desert which depicts 62 of Bruce Goff's buildings. He also used imagery from this movie for the music video Celtic Ghosts of German band Kreidler.

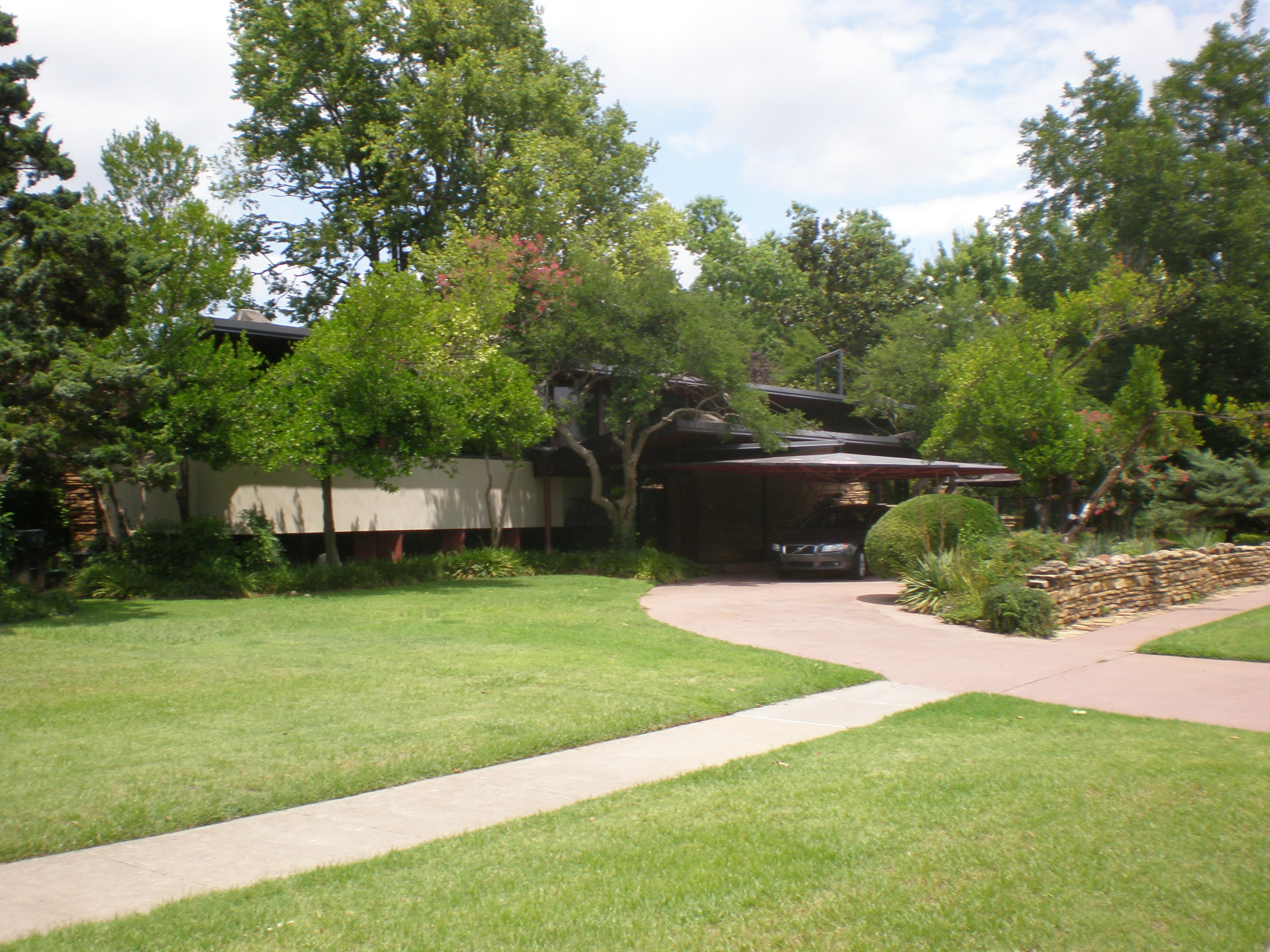
Ledbetter House

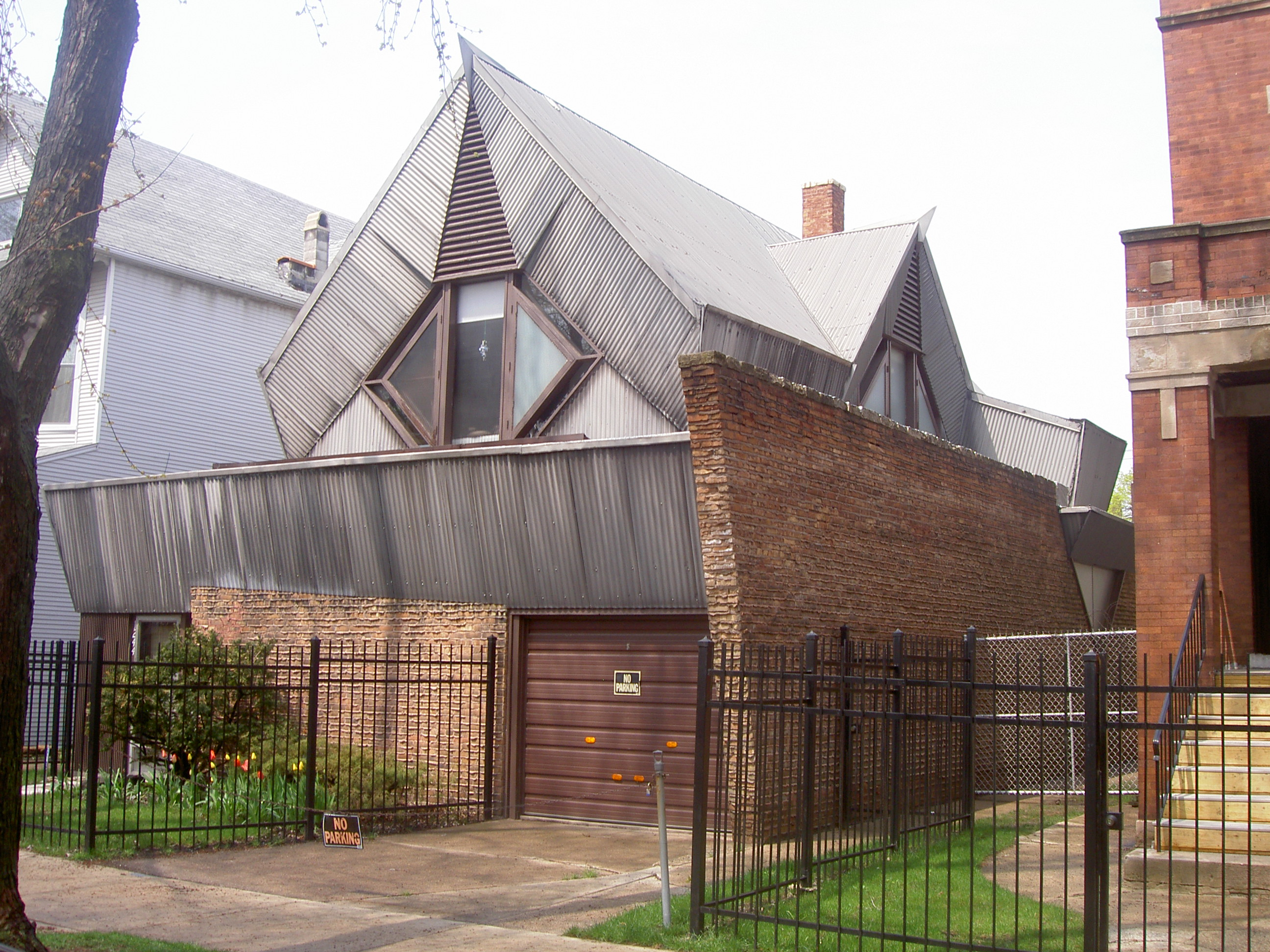
Bachman House

A 2019 feature-length documentary, Goff, was directed by Britni Harris and featured a comprehensive review of the architect's life and work as well as interviews with former colleagues, students and patrons.

== Selected works ==
Goff was active from the 1920s until his death, with several posthumous projects completed by associates. A number of his works have been listed on the U.S. National Register of Historic Places.

The following are selected major works:

- 1926: Boston Avenue Methodist Church, Tulsa, Oklahoma
- 1927: Page Warehouse, Tulsa (demolished)
- 1928: Riverside Studio, Tulsa, Oklahoma
- 1938: Turzak House, Chicago, Illinois
- 1946: San Lorenzo Community Church, San Lorenzo, California
- 1947: Ledbetter House, Norman, Oklahoma
- 1948: Bachman House, Chicago, Illinois
- 1950: Bavinger House, Norman, Oklahoma (demolished in 2016)
- 1950: Sam and Ruth Van Sickle Ford House, Aurora, Illinois
- 1955: John Frank House, Sapulpa, Oklahoma
- 1968: Glen Mitchell House, Dodge City, Kansas
- 1970: Glen Harder House, Mountain Lake, Minnesota
- 1978: Pavilion for Japanese Art at the Los Angeles County Museum of Art, Los Angeles, California
- 1982: Struckus House in Woodland Hills, Los Angeles, California

== Contributions ==
Goff's contributions to the history of 20th-century architecture are widely praised. His extant archive—including architectural drawings, paintings, musical compositions, photographs, project files, and personal and professional papers—is held by the Ryerson & Burnham Libraries at the Art Institute of Chicago.

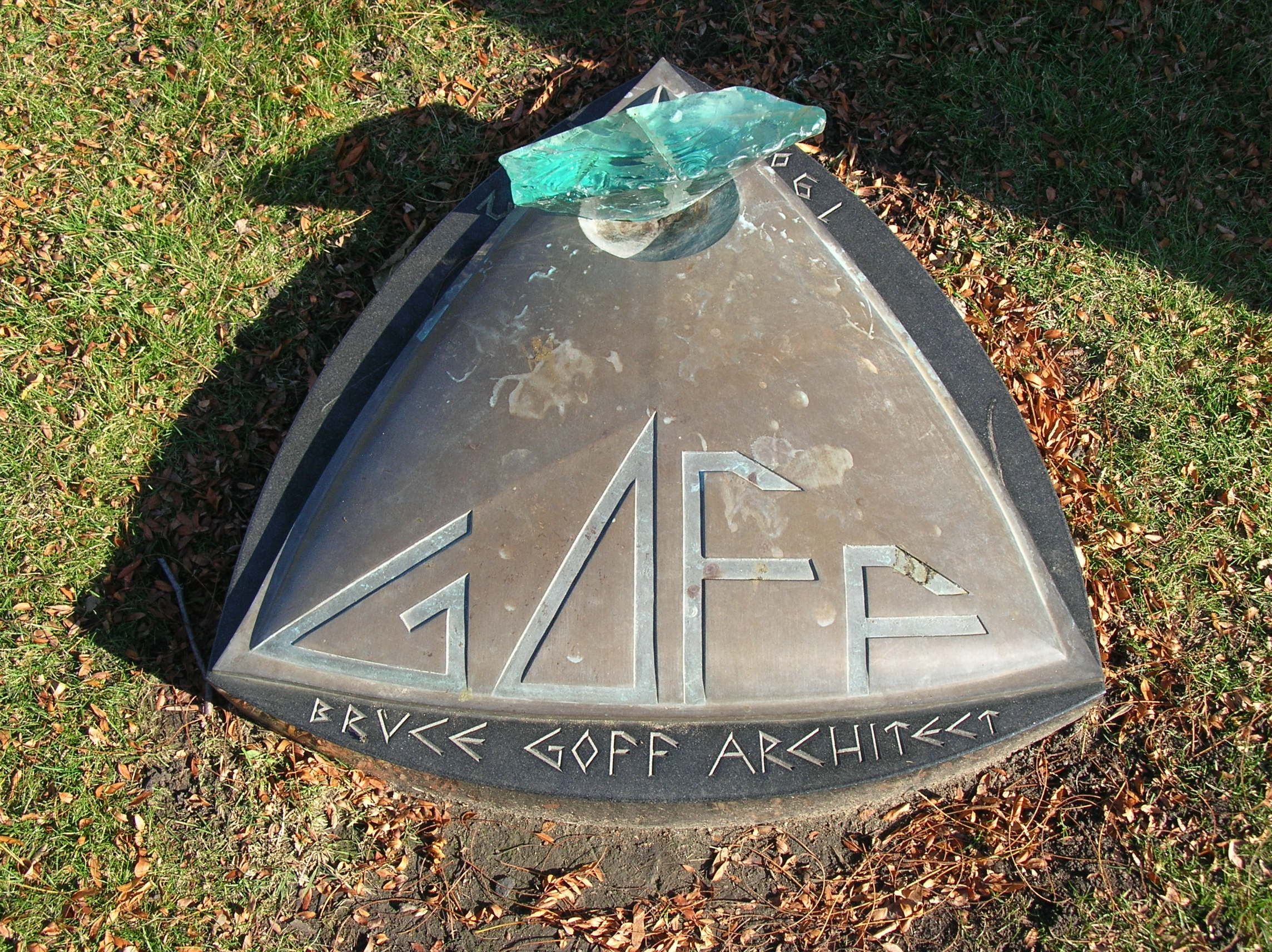
Bruce Goff's headstone, designed by his student Grant Gustafson

His Bavinger House was awarded the Twenty-five Year Award from the American Institute of Architects in 1987, and Boston Avenue Methodist Church was designated a National Historic Landmark in 1999.

== Death ==
Goff died in Tyler, Texas, on August 4, 1982. His cremated remains are interred in Graceland Cemetery, Chicago, Illinois, with a marker designed by Grant Gustafson, one of Goff's students, which incorporates a glass cullet fragment salvaged from the ruins of the Joe D. Price House and Studio.

== Additional sources ==
- Birkerts, Gunnar (April 1994). Process and Expression in Architectural Form (The Bruce Alonzo Goff Series in Creative Architecture). Vol. 1. University of Oklahoma Press. ISBN 978-0-8061-2642-5.
- Cook, Jeffrey (January 1, 1978). The Architecture of Bruce Goff. Granada Publishing Limited. ISBN 978-0-246-11315-3.
- De Long, David G. (August 19, 1988). Bruce Goff: Toward Absolute Architecture (1st ed.). The MIT Press. ISBN 978-0-262-04097-6.
- Pauline Saliga, ed. (June 1995). The Architecture of Bruce Goff: Design for the Continuous Present. Mary Woolever. Prestel. ISBN 978-3-7913-1453-2.
- Welch, Philip B. (November 1996). Goff on Goff: Conversations and Lectures. University of Oklahoma Press. ISBN 978-0-8061-2868-9.
