= Depew, Oklahoma =

Town in Oklahoma, US

- Town
- Along Historic Route 66 as it passes through Depew, November 2026

- Location within Creek County, and the state of Oklahoma
- Coordinates: 35°48′16″N 96°31′47″W
- Country: United States
- State: Oklahoma
- County: Creek

Area
  - Total: 1.02 sq mi (2.64 km^{2})
  - Land: 1.02 sq mi (2.64 km^{2})
  - Water: 0 sq mi (0.00 km^{2})
- Elevation: 883 ft (269 m)

Population (2020)
  - Total: 411
  - Density: 403.7/sq mi (155.86/km^{2})
- Time zone: UTC-6 (Central (CST))
  - Summer (DST): UTC-5 (CDT)
- ZIP Code: 74028
- Area codes: 539/918
- FIPS code: 40-20300
- GNIS feature ID: 2412420

Depew is a town in Creek County, Oklahoma, United States. It is 41 miles southwest of Tulsa. The population was 411 at the 2020 census. The town was named in honor of New York Senator Chauncey Depew.

== History ==
Depew began as a settlement named Hall in 1898, when the St. Louis and Oklahoma City Railroad (later merged into the St. Louis and San Francisco Railway) built a line between Sapulpa and Oklahoma City. In 1901, Walter F. Malley opened a post office and gave the community its present name.

Depew is along Oklahoma State Highway 66, previously known as the federal Route 66. The railroad trackage remains in existence, now operated by the Stillwater Central Railroad. Depew still has a Post Office, located at 316 W Main St.

== Geography ==
Depew is approximately 29 miles southwest of Sapulpa, the county seat.

According to the United States Census Bureau, the town has a total area of 0.4 square miles (1.0 km^{2}), all land.

== Demographics ==
Historical population
Census	Pop.	Note	%±
1930	1,126		—
1940	876		−22.2%
1950	719		−17.9%
1960	686		−4.6%
1970	739		7.7%
1980	682		−7.7%
1990	502		−26.4%
2000	564		12.4%
2010	476		−15.6%
2020	411		−13.7%
U.S. Decennial Census

=== 2020 census ===
As of the 2020 census, Depew had a population of 411. The median age was 40.8 years. 26.3% of residents were under the age of 18 and 20.0% of residents were 65 years of age or older. For every 100 females there were 98.6 males, and for every 100 females age 18 and over there were 91.8 males age 18 and over.

0.0% of residents lived in urban areas, while 100.0% lived in rural areas.

There were 159 households in Depew, of which 39.6% had children under the age of 18 living in them. Of all households, 42.8% were married-couple households, 22.0% were households with a male householder and no spouse or partner present, and 31.4% were households with a female householder and no spouse or partner present. About 23.3% of all households were made up of individuals and 13.2% had someone living alone who was 65 years of age or older.

There were 205 housing units, of which 22.4% were vacant. The homeowner vacancy rate was 6.4% and the rental vacancy rate was 7.9%.

Racial composition as of the 2020 census
Race	Number	Percent
White	313	76.2%
Black or African American	17	4.1%
American Indian and Alaska Native	45	10.9%
Asian	0	0.0%
Native Hawaiian and Other Pacific Islander	1	0.2%
Some other race	2	0.5%
Two or more races	33	8.0%
Hispanic or Latino (of any race)	8	1.9%

=== 2000 census ===
As of the census of 2000, there were 564 people, 213 households, and 145 families residing in the town. The population density was 1,423.4 inhabitants per square mile (549.6/km^{2}). There were 240 housing units at an average density of 605.7 per square mile (233.9/km^{2}). The racial makeup of the town was 74.47% White, 8.69% African American, 9.57% Native American, and 7.27% from two or more races. Hispanic or Latino of any race were 1.42% of the population.

There were 213 households, out of which 38.0% had children under the age of 18 living with them, 50.2% were married couples living together, 13.1% had a female householder with no husband present, and 31.5% were non-families. 29.6% of all households were made up of individuals, and 15.0% had someone living alone who was 65 years of age or older. The average household size was 2.65 and the average family size was 3.32.

1910 bank building, now Depew's Town Hall, in November 2026

In the town, the population was spread out, with 31.0% under the age of 18, 9.2% from 18 to 24, 27.3% from 25 to 44, 18.1% from 45 to 64, and 14.4% who were 65 years of age or older. The median age was 33 years. For every 100 females there were 88.0 males. For every 100 females age 18 and over, there were 86.1 males.

The median income for a household in the town was $25,536, and the median income for a family was $29,250. Males had a median income of $23,438 versus $18,542 for females. The per capita income for the town was $10,868. About 19.2% of families and 22.4% of the population were below the poverty line, including 30.5% of those under age 18 and 16.7% of those age 65 or over.

== Notable people ==
- Wayne Cooper, (b. 1942) Western artist and sculptor
- Calvin C. Goode, (1929-2020) former Phoenix city councilman

== See also ==
- List of municipalities in Oklahoma
