= New Mexico State Aggies =

Athletics programs of New Mexico State University

- University: New Mexico State University
- Nickname: Aggies
- NCAA: Division I (FBS)
- Conference: Conference USA
- Athletic director: Joe Fields
- Location: Las Cruces, New Mexico
- Varsity teams: 16 (6 men’s and 10 women’s)
- Football stadium: Aggie Memorial Stadium
- Basketball arena: Pan American Center
- Baseball stadium: Presley Askew Field
- Softball stadium: NM State Softball Complex
- Soccer stadium: NM State Soccer Athletic Complex
- Other venues: New Mexico State University Golf Course; NM State Swimming and Diving Complex; NM State Tennis Center; NMSU Track and Field Complex
- Colors: Crimson and white
- Mascot: Pistol Pete
- Fight song: Aggie Fight Song
- Website: www.nmstatesports.com

The New Mexico State University teams are called the Aggies, a nickname derived from the university's agricultural beginnings. The mascot is known as "Pistol Pete". NMSU's colors are crimson and white. Since 2023 the Aggies have competed in Conference USA in all men's and women's sports. New Mexico State sponsors six men's and ten women's teams in NCAA sanctioned sports. Joe Fields serves as NMSU's athletic director after taking charge on October 8, 2025.

== Nickname ==
The "Aggies" nickname derives from the university's agricultural roots and status as a land grant institution. Prior to 2000 the women's intercollegiate athletic teams were known as the Roadrunners, placing NMSU among the handful of NCAA Division I schools which had separate nicknames and mascots for its men's and women's programs. By the late 1990s sentiment began to grow for the university to adopt a single, uniform mascot for all its athletic teams, and during the 1999–2000 academic year the school's female student athletes voted to adopt the "Aggies" moniker. NMSU's women's teams officially became the Aggies at the start of the 2000–2001 academic year.

== History ==
=== Conference history ===
The NMSU Aggies have had various conference affiliations, listed below with the year of change:

- 1931 – Border Conference
- 1962 – Independent
- 1971 – Missouri Valley
- 1983 – Big West (formerly Pacific Coast Athletic Association)
- 2001 – Sun Belt
- 2005 – WAC
  - Football: Independent (2013), Sun Belt (2014–2017), Independent (2018–2022)
- 2023 – Conference USA

NMSU maintains major rivalries with the University of New Mexico in Albuquerque, called the "Rio Grande Rivalry," and with the University of Texas at El Paso, called "The Battle of I-10." The winner of the NMSU-UTEP football game receives the Silver Spade trophy. Since a major reconfiguration of the WAC in 2013, NMSU has also developed a rivalry with Grand Canyon University in Phoenix, Arizona, as two of the conference's more passionate fan bases and successful programs.

The Big West Conference discontinued its sponsorship of football after the 2000 season, and the WAC dropped it following the 2012 season.

On November 5, 2021, an offer to join Conference USA was accepted with a start date of July 2023.

== Sports sponsored ==
Conference USA logo in New Mexico State's colors

Men's sports	Women's sports
Baseball	Basketball
Basketball	Cross country
Cross country	Golf
Football	Soccer
Golf	Softball
Tennis	Swimming and diving
	Tennis
	Track and field^{†}
	Volleyball
† – Track and field includes both indoor and outdoor.

=== Baseball ===
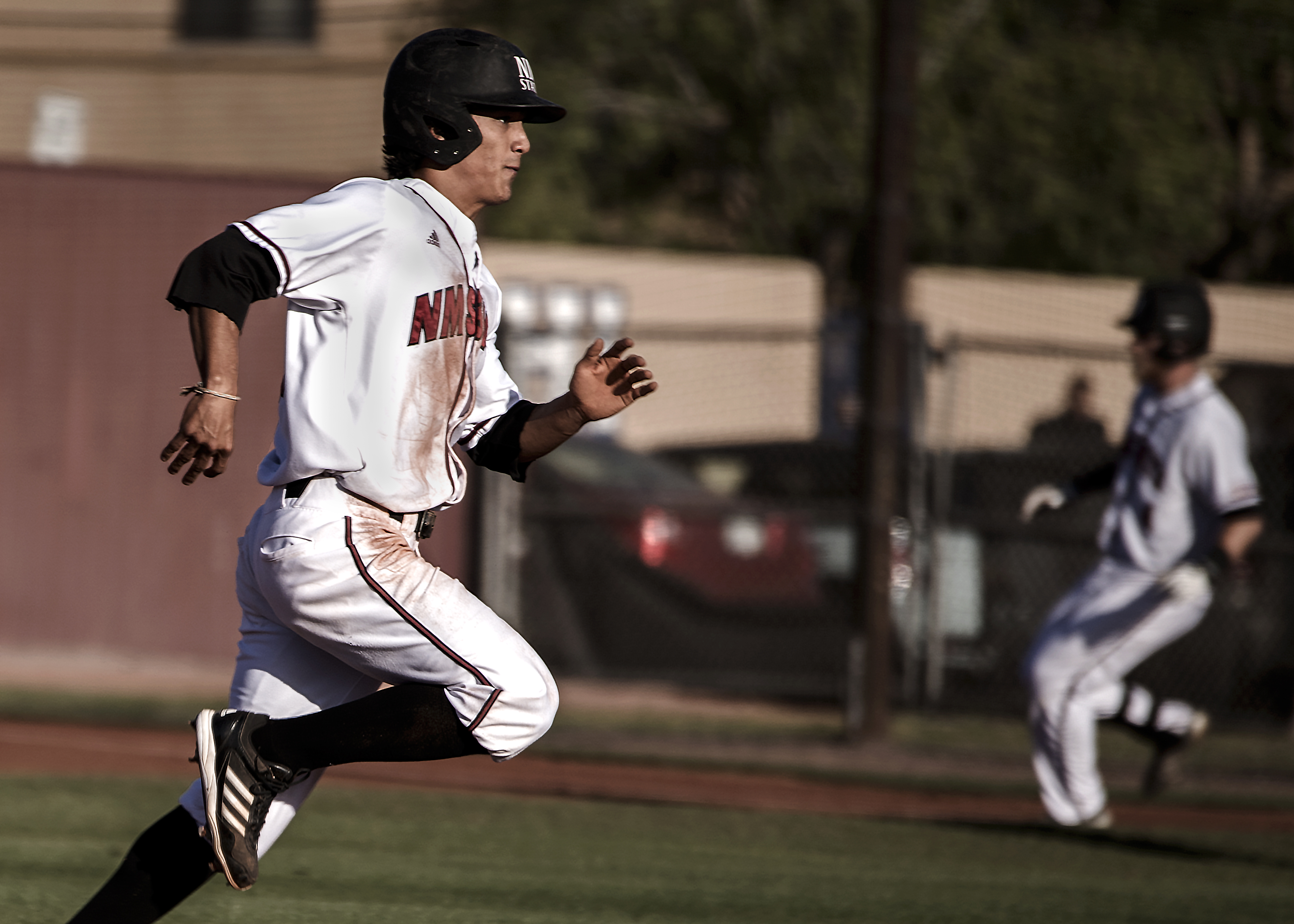
An Aggies baseball player running the bases during a game in 2014

New Mexico State's first baseball team was fielded in 1907. The team plays its home games at Presley Askew Field.

=== Basketball ===
NMSU Basketball has seen much success throughout the years, highlighted by an NCAA Final Four appearance in 1970. The Aggies basketball program has seen 19 NCAA tournament appearances, 5 NIT Tournament appearances and 16 conference championships. Under Chris Jans, the Aggies won their first NCAA tournament in 2022, the program's first tournament victory in 25 years. After the season, Jans was hired to coach at Mississippi State. His replacement, Greg Heiar, was dismissed on February 15, 2023, in the wake of scandals involving a NMSU basketball player fatally shooting a University of New Mexico student and several NMSU basketball players sexually assaulting a teammate; the university also canceled the rest of the team's games for the 2022–2023 season.

=== Football ===
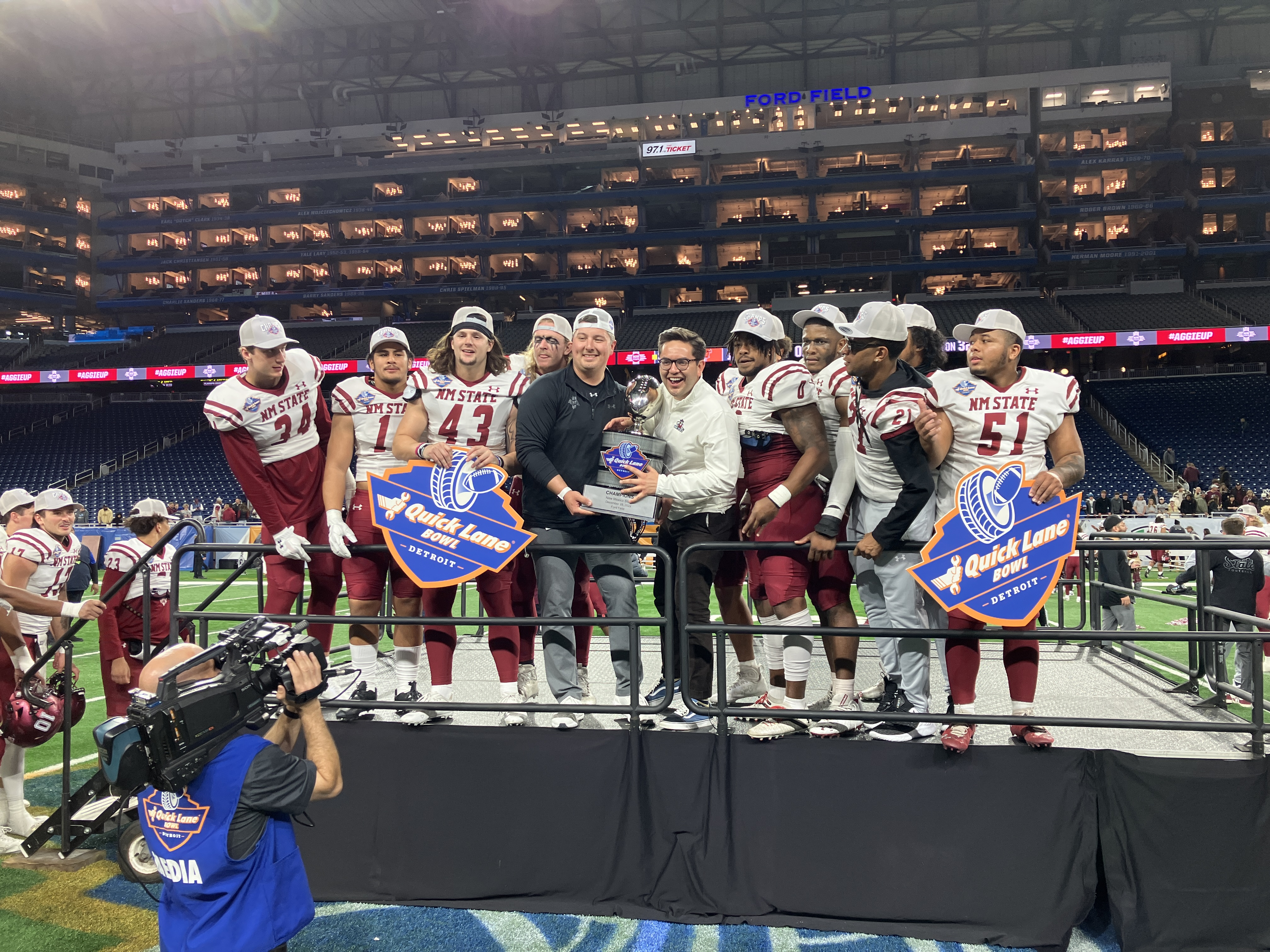
The 2022 Aggies football team celebrating a victory at the 2022 Quick Lane Bowl

The Aggies won the Sun Bowl in 1959 and 1960 under coach Warren B. Woodson and continued to do well until he was let go in 1967. Since then the Aggies have had only 6 winning seasons and 2 conference championships in 1976 and 1978. The 1976 championship was shared with Tulsa.

NMSU usually plays two big rivalry games each year against New Mexico and UTEP. UTEP is located just 45 miles to the south on I-10. This rivalry is often referred to as The Battle of I-10. UNM is less than 250 miles to the north on I-25. This rivalry was traditionally called The Battle of I-25 until it officially became the Rio Grande Rivalry in 2007 as part of a points system that includes all varsity sports competitions between the two schools.

=== Men's golf ===
The men's golf team has won 18 conference championships:

- Missouri Valley Conference (5): 1973, 1976, 1980, 1981, 1983
- Big West Conference (3): 1987^, 1995, 2000^
- Sun Belt Conference (1): 2004
- Western Athletic Conference (9): 2006, 2008–2011, 2013–2015, 2021

^ Co-champions

Aggies who have won at the professional level include Rich Beem (three PGA Tour wins including 2002 PGA Championship), Bart Bryant (three PGA Tour wins), Tom Byrum (one PGA Tour win), and Steve Haskins (two Web.com Tour wins).

=== Softball ===
The Aggie softball team has appeared in one Women's College World Series in 1981.

=== Volleyball ===
Since the arrival of head coach Mike Jordan in 1998 the Aggies have established a rich tradition as one of the nation's most consistently competitive mid-major volleyball programs. In Jordan's quarter century at the helm the Aggies have made 10 NCAA Tournament appearances and won or shared a combined 19 regular season and tournament championships across their time in both the Sun Belt and Western Athletic Conferences. In 2006 the Aggies became the first opponent in eight years to defeat perennial national power Hawaii in WAC play, snapping its NCAA record 114-match conference winning streak.

== Former varsity sports ==
- Equestrian - At the time of disbandment in 2017, equestrian was recognized by the NCAA as an "emerging sport" for women, but did not yet have an NCAA-sponsored team championship. The equestrian team formerly competed as a member of the United Equestrian Conference and the National Collegiate Equestrian Association, but was considered by the NCAA to be an Independent.

== Athletic facilities ==
- Aggie Memorial Stadium – Football
- Pan American Center – Men's and women's basketball, Volleyball
- Presley Askew Field – Baseball
- New Mexico State University Golf Course – Men's and women's golf, Men's and women's cross country
- NM State Soccer Athletic Complex – Women's soccer
- NM State Softball Complex – Softball
- NM State Swimming and Diving Complex – Women's swimming and diving
- NM State Tennis Center – Men's and women's tennis
- NMSU Track and Field Complex – Women's outdoor track and field

== New Mexico State traditions ==
=== Fight song ===
NMSU's "Aggie Fight Song" is based on a popular turn-of-the-century song titled "Oh Didn't He Ramble." The music and lyrics are similar to songs used by several other universities, most notably Cal ("California Drinking Song") and Ohio State ("I Wanna Go Back to Ohio State"). However, only NMSU uses it as the primary school song. The fight song's lyrics have evoked some controversy in recent years due to the reference to drinking, but a vast majority of students and alumni support preserving the traditional lyrics.

Additionally, during the time that NMSU's women's teams were known as the Roadrunners, an arrangement of the theme song from the Warner Bros. "Road Runner" cartoons was used as the unofficial women's fight song. However, since the adoption of the Aggies nickname by the women's teams, this practice has fallen from use and the "Road Runner" song is no longer used.

=== Logo ===
For many years, NMSU's athletics logo was a caricature of gunfighter Frank "Pistol Pete" Eaton which is identical to the logo used by Oklahoma State. A block "NM STATE" logo was introduced in 2007 as a universal logo.

The current athletics logo was initially designed in 2005 as part of a plan to remake the university's image on the national stage; Pete's pistol was replaced with a lasso, and his name was briefly officially abbreviated to simply "Pete". In addition to the new logo, the costumed mascot seen at games was also given a new look, losing his six shooters and holster belt in favor of a lasso. The disarming of Pete led to a massive uproar among students, alumni and outsiders demanding the return of Pete's guns. The most popular nickname given to the widely unpopular new mascot was "Lasso Larry". After one year the university changed the mascot in favor of a real student dressed in more traditional cowboy attire, carrying a holster belt and six shooters, and wearing nothing on his head but a black cowboy hat. The "Pistol Pete" name was also restored. In 2007, NMSU modified the "Lasso Larry" logo to remove the lasso and once again depict Pistol Pete carrying pistols, and this is now the official athletics logo.

== Notable former Aggie athletes and coaches ==
Football

- Davon House, former Green Bay Packers cornerback
- Jonte Green, former Detroit Lions cornerback
- Taveon Rogers, former Cincinnati Bengals wide receiver, currently playing with the LA KISS of the AFL
- Jeremy Harris, current Washington Redskins cornerback
- Kemonte Bateman, former Denver Broncos wide receiver, currently playing with the Edmonton Eskimos of the CFL
- Donte Savage, former Green Bay Packers linebacker
- Carl Nicks, former Tampa Bay Buccaneers offensive lineman
- Chris Williams, former New Orleans Saints wide receiver, currently playing with the Hamilton Tiger-Cats of the CFL
- Buck Pierce, former player of and current QB coach with the Winnipeg Blue Bombers of the CFL
- Leo Barker former NFL linebacker, played in Super Bowl XXIII with the Cincinnati Bengals;
- Courtney Bryan, NFL safety;
- Nick Cole, current Philadelphia Eagles offensive lineman;
- Roy Gerela, former NFL kicker, won three Super Bowls with the Pittsburgh Steelers;
- Duriel Harris, former NFL receiver;
- Charley Johnson, former NFL quarterback, only football player in school history to have his uniform number (33) retired, member of Denver Broncos Ring of Fame;
- Kenton Keith, NFL and CFL running back (Indianapolis Colts, Hamilton Tiger-Cats);
- Donald Malloy, former NFL, CFL, and Arena Football League strong safety;
- Denvis Manns, former NFL Europa running back, third player in NCAA history to rush for 1,000 years in four consecutive seasons;
- Joe Pisarcik, former NFL and CFL quarterback;
- Siddeeq Shabazz, former NFL and CFL safety;
- Troy Sienkiewicz, former NFL San Diego Chargers offensive lineman;
- Danny Villanueva, former NFL punter and placekicker, later became a prominent television executive and was instrumental in founding Univision;
- Tony Wragge, current San Francisco 49ers guard;
- Fredd Young, former NFL linebacker Seattle Seahawks;

Men's basketball

- Randy Brown, former NBA guard, won three NBA Championships with Chicago Bulls, former assistant coach of Chicago Bulls;
- Steve Colter, former NBA guard with Portland, LA, Chicago, Philadelphia, Washington, Sacramento and Cleveland
- Jimmy Collins, former ABA and NBA guard, member of 1970 Final Four team, former head coach at UIC;
- Charlie Criss, former ABA and NBA guard, member of 1970 Final Four team;
- Lou Henson, former player and head coach, currently sixth-winningest coach in NCAA history with 779 career wins;
- Reggie Jordan, former NBA guard, Los Angeles Lakers, Atlanta Hawks, Portland Trail Blazers, Minnesota Timberwolves and Washington Wizards.
- Sam Lacey, former NBA All-Star center, member of 1970 Final Four team;
- Reggie Theus, former head men's basketball coach; former NBA Head coach of Sacramento Kings;
- John Whisenant, former NBA guard, former coach of WNBA's Sacramento Monarchs, 2005 WNBA Coach of the Year; Former Assistant Coach at the University of New Mexico
- "Super John" Williamson, former ABA and NBA guard, number retired by New Jersey Nets
- Pascal Siakam, NBA forward, won an NBA Finals with Toronto Raptors, 2019 NBA Most Improved Player

Women's basketball

- Anita Maxwell, former WNBA forward for the Cleveland Rockers, only basketball player (male or female) in school history to have her uniform number (40) retired.
