= Oklahoma State Cowgirls equestrian =

Oklahoma State Cowgirls Equestrian
- Founded: 1999
- University: Oklahoma State University
- Head coach: Larry Sanchez (26th season)
- Conference: Big 12 Conference
- Home arena: Pedigo-Hull Equestrian Center
- Nickname: Cowgirls
- Colors: Orange and Black

National championships
- 2022

Conference championships
- 2009, 2012, 2013, 2014, 2016, 2018, 2021, 2022, 2023, 2024, 2025, 2026

The Oklahoma State Cowgirls equestrian team represents Oklahoma State University in the NCAA Division I emerging sport of equestrian as part of the National Collegiate Equestrian Association. The team competes in the Big 12 Conference and are led by 5-time Big 12 Coach of the Year, Larry Sanchez.

== History ==
Oklahoma State equestrian debuted in 1999, led by Larry Sanchez, who moved to Stillwater from New Mexico State to launch the program. The Cowgirls found success quickly, winning the 2000 IHSA Western National Championship, the program's first individual national title. Oklahoma State would continue to win individual national titles, claiming three more Varsity Western National Championships in 2003, 2004 and 2006. The Cowgirls would win their first Big 12 title at the inaugural conference tournament in 2009, their first of 12 total conference championships. Oklahoma State would claim their fifth individual national title in 2013, winning the NCEA Western National Championship over Kansas State.

Oklahoma State would continue to dominate the rest of the conference, winning more Big 12 conference titles than any other program, but were unable to capture the program's first overall NCEA National Championship until 2022. The Cowgirls would have their best season in program history, going 15–2 en route to winning another Big 12 title and receiving the #1 seed at the NCEA Championship in Ocala. After grabbing two wins to move into the finals, Oklahoma State defeated Texas A&M to win the first overall NCEA National Championship in program history. In 2026, the Cowgirls won the Big 12 title for a conference-record sixth consecutive year.

== NCEA National Team Championships ==
Oklahoma State has won one overall NCEA National Championship, coming in the 2022 season. The Cowgirls earned the #1 seed in the NCEA Championship before defeating Fresno State and TCU to clinch a spot in the finals. Oklahoma State would go on to defeat Texas A&M 11–9 to claim the school's first overall national title.

Year	Seed	Opponent	Result
2022	#1	Texas A&M	11–9

== Honors ==
=== All-Americans ===
Oklahoma State counts 75 All-America honors in program history, and 38 different Cowgirls have earned All-America status in their careers. Abigail Brayman, Lauren Halvorson, Harley Huff, Kary Krshka and Jojo Roberson earned All-America accolades four times in their distinguished careers.

=== NCEA Coach of the Year ===
- Larry Sanchez (2013, 2022)

== Facilities ==
The Pedigo-Hull Equestrian Center is located in Stillwater, Oklahoma, about two miles off the Oklahoma State campus. The building consists of a saddling barn that includes coaches' offices, locker rooms, a tack room and an athletic training satellite office. It also has a 24-stall horse barn with outdoor runs and several paddocks and pastures. A new multipurpose team building that includes a team lounge with study area and a fueling station was completed in 2021.

== See also ==
- Oklahoma State Cowboys and Cowgirls
