= Heyburn =

Heyburn may refer to:

- Weldon Heyburn (1910–1951), American film actor
- Weldon B. Heyburn, United States Senator from Idaho from 1903 until 1912
- Weldon Brinton Heyburn, Pennsylvania State Senator from 1937 to 1949
- Heyburn, Idaho, small town named after Weldon B. Heyburn
- Mount Heyburn, a mountain in Idaho named after Weldon B. Heyburn
- John G. Heyburn II (1948–2015), United States District Court Judge

== See also ==
- Heyburn Building, a 17-floor, 250-foot (76-m) building in downtown Louisville, Kentucky, United States
- Heyburn State Park, an Idaho state park in Benewah County, Idaho in the United States
- Heyburn Lake, a reservoir on Polecat Creek in Creek County, Oklahoma
