= Kellyville, Oklahoma =

Town in Oklahoma, US

- Town
- Route 66 mural in Kellyville, August 2026
- Nickname: Cullerville
- Location within Creek County, and the state of Oklahoma
- Coordinates: 35°56′26″N 96°12′49″W
- Country: United States
- State: Oklahoma
- County: Creek

Area
  - Total: 1.93 sq mi (5.01 km^{2})
  - Land: 1.93 sq mi (4.99 km^{2})
  - Water: 0.0039 sq mi (0.01 km^{2})
- Elevation: 794 ft (242 m)

Population (2020)
  - Total: 1,019
  - Density: 528.4/sq mi (204.03/km^{2})
- Time zone: UTC-6 (Central (CST))
  - Summer (DST): UTC-5 (CDT)
- ZIP code: 74039
- Area codes: 539/918
- FIPS code: 40-39000
- GNIS feature ID: 2412821
- Website: kellyvilleok.gov

Kellyville is a town in Creek County, Oklahoma, United States. The population was 1,019 at the 2020 census.

== History ==
Kellyville was named for James E. Kelly, who established a local trading post in 1892 and opened a post office on November 27, 1893. The St. Louis and Oklahoma City Railroad—later merged into the St. Louis and San Francisco Railway ("Frisco")-- built a line through Kellyville in 1898.

Oklahoma's worst train disaster took place just west of Kellyville on September 28, 1917, when two Frisco trains collided. Twenty-three people were killed and eighty injured. It remains one of the country's bloodiest train wrecks due to the large number of cattle deaths.

Oil and gas were discovered nearby in 1915. This created a population boom and attracted construction of a refinery in Kellyville. By 1930, the population was 548. Although oil and gas production waned, population continued to grow. Now, a significant number of employed residents commute to jobs in Sapulpa and Tulsa. However, Webco Industries has become a major local employer, having opened a corrosion-resistant alloy plant in Kellyville in 2008 which produces specialty nickel alloy and stainless tubing. The plant was significantly expanded in 2018.

In the early 1970s, there were plans to build a ski resort in Kellyville — Oklahoma's first — using artificial snow, but the idea was short-lived due to the region's climate.

== Geography ==
Kellyville is located approximately 8 miles (13 km) southwest of Sapulpa, the Creek County seat, on Oklahoma State Highway 66 (former U.S. Route 66).

According to the United States Census Bureau, the town has a total area of 1.2 square miles (3.1 km^{2}), all land.

== Demographics ==
Historical population
Census	Pop.	Note	%±
1930	548		—
1940	647		18.1%
1950	528		−18.4%
1960	501		−5.1%
1970	685		36.7%
1980	960		40.1%
1990	984		2.5%
2000	906		−7.9%
2010	1,150		26.9%
2020	1,019		−11.4%
U.S. Decennial Census

=== 2020 census ===
As of the 2020 census, Kellyville had a population of 1,019. The median age was 35.8 years. 28.3% of residents were under the age of 18 and 13.3% of residents were 65 years of age or older. For every 100 females there were 93.0 males, and for every 100 females age 18 and over there were 87.9 males age 18 and over.

0.0% of residents lived in urban areas, while 100.0% lived in rural areas.

There were 377 households in Kellyville, of which 37.1% had children under the age of 18 living in them. Of all households, 43.0% were married-couple households, 15.9% were households with a male householder and no spouse or partner present, and 32.1% were households with a female householder and no spouse or partner present. About 29.1% of all households were made up of individuals and 12.7% had someone living alone who was 65 years of age or older.

There were 461 housing units, of which 18.2% were vacant. The homeowner vacancy rate was 1.5% and the rental vacancy rate was 16.3%.

Racial composition as of the 2020 census
Race	Number	Percent
White	774	76.0%
Black or African American	9	0.9%
American Indian and Alaska Native	115	11.3%
Asian	1	0.1%
Native Hawaiian and Other Pacific Islander	0	0.0%
Some other race	26	2.6%
Two or more races	94	9.2%
Hispanic or Latino (of any race)	48	4.7%

Kellyville Public Library, August 2026

=== 2000 census ===
At the 2000 census, there were 906 people, 349 households and 258 families residing in the town. The population density was 1,045.1 inhabitants per square mile (403.5/km^{2}). There were 413 housing units at an average density of 476.4 per square mile (183.9/km^{2}). The racial makeup of the town was 83.55% White, 0.66% African American, 10.15% Native American, 0.11% Pacific Islander, 0.55% from other races, and 4.97% from two or more races. Hispanic or Latino of any race were 1.32% of the population.

There were 349 households, of which 33.5% had children under the age of 18 living with them, 53.3% were married couples living together, 14.9% had a female householder with no husband present, and 25.8% were non-families. 23.5% of all households were made up of individuals, and 11.2% had someone living alone who was 65 years of age or older. The average household size was 2.60 and the average family size was 3.03.

26.4% of the population were under the age of 18, 10.5% from 18 to 24, 27.7% from 25 to 44, 22.5% from 45 to 64, and 12.9% who were 65 years of age or older. The median age was 35 years. For every 100 females, there were 91.1 males. For every 100 females age 18 and over, there were 87.9 males.

The median household income was $30,688 and the median family income was $32,297. Males had a median income of $27,639 and females $18,229. The per capita income was $11,978. About 9.2% of families and 12.3% of the population were below the poverty line, including 19.8% of those under age 18 and 8.1% of those age 65 or over.

Heyburn Lake, Sunset Bay area, in August 2026

== Parks and recreation ==
Heyburn Lake and Heyburn State Park are about a 6 1/2-mile drive to the west of Kellyville. RV and tent camping is available, and the lake features picnic areas, a playground, a boat launch, swimming and fishing.

The Creek County Fairgrounds in Kellyville is the location for various local, county, state, and national events, including fairs, livestock shows & rodeos, trade shows, family reunions, conferences, banquets, and educational programs.

The Kellyville Public Park has playground equipment, a pavilion, and picnic tables.

Kellyville Upper Elementary School, 8-2026

== Education ==
It is in the Kellyville Public Schools.
