= Wayne Cooper (artist) =

American painter

Wayne Cooper was born in 1942 near Depew, Oklahoma and is of Yuchi descent. He is an internationally known artist, who specializes in Western Art. His upbringing in Oklahoma and Indian roots, are the subject of many of his artistic creations via oil and canvas. His professional career began in the early 1960s, and continues currently with his artwork.

== Education ==
His early training was with Woody Crumbo, a celebrated Potawatomi artist and educator who taught at Bacone College. Cooper also studied at the Famous Artists School correspondence courses, the Gary Artist League of Gary, Indiana; Valparaiso University in Valparaiso, Indiana; and the American Atelier in New York City, New York.

== Artwork ==
Cooper's media include oils, watercolors, charcoals, pencil, and bronze sculpture, as well as lithographs. The Oklahoma State Capital has commissioned over fourteen pieces of art from Cooper.

His early artwork began about 1963, and many of his early barn paintings were reminiscent of masterpieces by Andrew Wyeth and Eric Sloane.

== Career ==
Wayne Cooper has presented special shows at the Will Rogers Memorial, University of Kentucky, Indiana Capitol Building, University of New Mexico, Governor's Mansion in Indianapolis, and Oklahoma State Capitol.

Cooper was commissioned by Perkins, Oklahoma to create two 12 foot bronze sculptures which extend to 18 foot on their pedestals. One is of legendary cowboy Frank Eaton, also known as “Pistol Pete”, the mascot of Oklahoma State University. The other bronze is of Iowa chief “No Heart”.
