= NCEA =

NCEA may refer to:

- National Certificate of Educational Achievement, New Zealand's main secondary school qualification
- National Council for Educational Awards, Ireland
- National Catholic Educational Association, United States
- National Collegiate Equestrian Association, United States
