= Polecat Creek (Arkansas River tributary) =

Physical characteristics
- Source: Ground water
  - location: Drumright, Oklahoma
  - coordinates: 35.9586811°N 96.5258477°W
  - length: 65.19 miles (104.91 km)
- Mouth: Arkansas River
  - location: Jenks, Oklahoma
  - coordinates: 36.0073184°N 95.9566603°W
- Basin size: 370.1 sq mi (959 km^{2})

Basin features
- Progression: Arkansas→ Mississippi→ Gulf of Mexico
- Population: 77,858
- Waterbodies: Heyburn Lake

Polecat Creek is a 65.19 miles (104.91 km)-long stream in the U.S. state of Oklahoma. It is a tributary of the Arkansas River.

== Flood control ==
Since the twentieth century, flood control within the Polecat Creek watershed has been a concern for local residents. In 1950, the United States Army Corps of Engineers built Heyburn Lake as a flood control reservoir at a cost of $2.5 million. The reservoir also supplies water to the region and is used for recreation. In recent decades, flood events have led to greater concerns. A flood in 2000 damaged around 300 structures in the city of Sapulpa, with an estimated $12 million in damage. The Army Corps proposed a study of the watershed in 2012, but it failed to receive government funding.

== Watershed ==
The creek drains a 370.1 square miles (959 km^{2}) watershed across three counties in Oklahoma: Creek, Okmulgee, and Tulsa. The entirety of the city of Sapulpa, along with almost all of Jenks and Glenpool, are included in the watershed. Part of the city of Tulsa is also included.
