= Heyburn Lake =

Reservoir in Oklahoma, United States

- Entrance to Heyburn Lake, August 2026

- Location within Oklahoma Location within the United States
- Location: Creek County, near Kellyville, Oklahoma
- Coordinates: 35°57′09″N 96°18′10″W
- Basin countries: United States
- Managing agency: U.S. Army Corps of Engineers
- Built: 1950
- Surface area: 940 acres (380 ha)
- Water volume: 55,395 acre⋅ft (68,329,000 m^{3})
- Shore length^{1}: 52 mi (84 km)
- Surface elevation: 784 ft (239 m)
- ^{1} Shore length is not a well-defined measure.

Heyburn Lake is a reservoir on Polecat Creek in Creek County, Oklahoma, United States. It is about 15 miles (24 km) southwest of Sapulpa, Oklahoma. Tiger and Brown Creeks also drain into the lake. The nearest town is Kellyville, Oklahoma. It was named for the now-defunct community of Heyburn. Its primary objectives are to provide flood control, drinking water and recreation. It is owned by the Corps of Engineers. Heyburn State Park (Oklahoma) adjoins the lake.

== Description ==
The earthen dam was completed in 1950, and is 89 feet (27 m) above the original streambed and 2,920 feet (890 m) long.

The lake capacity is 55,030 acre-feet (67,880,000 m^{3}); the conservation storage provides 3,800 acre-feet (4,700,000 m^{3}) of storage which includes 1,900 acre-feet (2,300,000 m^{3}) for water supply and 1,900 acre-feet (2,300,000 m^{3}) for sediment reserve. The flood storage portion of the lake has 48,410 acre-feet (59,710,000 m^{3}) reserved to store flood waters. The normal surface area is 940 acres (380 ha). The shoreline is 52 miles (84 km).

== Recreation facilities ==
Heyburn Lake, Sunset Bay area, as seen in August of 2026

Recreational facilities include boating, water skiing, swimming and fishing. Three areas offer campgrounds: Sunset Bay (tent sites), Sheppard Point (tent and RV sites) and Heyburn Park (RV sites). They all have picnic areas, restrooms, showers, playgrounds and boat launches.

The Heyburn Public Hunting Area is a 6,000 acres (2,400 ha) tract that allows hunting quail, squirrel, rabbit, waterfowl and wild turkey.

== Heyburn, Oklahoma ==
The hamlet known as Heyburn, Oklahoma, was built along the Frisco railroad during the 1880s. It was named for a local resident, Clay Heyburn. By 1920, there were 35 residents, a railroad station, a post office, two general stores and a cotton gin. The post office opened December 11, 1911 and closed October 14, 1922. When U, S. Route 66 was built a half mile north of the community, one of the general stores moved to the highway. The rest of the hamlet was soon abandoned and the structures vanished. The store on the highway has changed owners and locations several times, but is still known as the Heyburn store.
