= Linda Livingstone =

15th president of Baylor University

15th President of Baylor University
- Incumbent
- Assumed office June 1, 2017
- Preceded by: Ken Starr

Dean of the George Washington University School of Business
- In office August 1, 2014 – May 31, 2017
- Preceded by: Doug Guthrie
- Succeeded by: Vivek Choudhury (interim)

Personal details
- Born: Linda Ann Parrack Perkins, Oklahoma, U.S.
- Spouse: Brad Livingstone
- Children: 1
- Education: Oklahoma State University (BA, MBA, PhD)
- Profession: Businesswoman, professor, university administrator
- Website: Office of the President

Academic background
- Thesis: Person-environment Fit on the Dimension of Creativity: Relationships with Strain, Job Satisfaction and Performance (1992)
- Doctoral advisor: Debra Nelson

Academic work
- Discipline: Management
- Institutions: Baylor University; Pepperdine University; Graziadio School of Business and Management; George Washington University School of Business

Linda Ann Parrack Livingstone is an American academic administrator who has served as president of Baylor University since June 1, 2017.

== Early life ==
Linda Parrack was born to basketball coach Doyle Parrack and his wife Charlotte. She grew up in Perkins, Oklahoma, and attended Oklahoma State University, where she also played basketball. Livingstone earned her bachelor's degree in economics and management and graduated Omicron Delta Kappa in 1982, where she later returned to school for a master's in business administration (MBA). She received a doctorate in 1992.

== Career ==
After receiving her MBA, Livingstone went to work for four years in Woodward, Oklahoma as Director of Kids, Inc. Then she worked for a year in Enid doing financial work for Enid Memorial Hospital. She returned to OSU to earn her PhD.

Livingstone taught at Baylor University from 1991 to 1998, when she was named associate dean of Baylor's Hankamer School of Business. Livingstone left Baylor for Pepperdine University in 2002, where she was dean of the Graziadio School of Business and Management until 2014. She joined the faculty and administration of the George Washington University School of Business in 2014, serving concurrently as dean and professor until 2017. Livingstone took office as president of Baylor University on June 1, 2017. During her time at Pepperdine, Livingstone worked a $200 million expansion of the schools campuses, adding a conference center and an increase in scholarship support for students. She continued to help build the campus and enhance the school's global focus by leading the development of a plan for the business school.

== Personal ==
She is married to Brad Livingstone, a high school history teacher and former basketball player at Oklahoma State, with whom she has a daughter named Shelby. Shelby was a member of the Rice University volleyball team.
