= New Mexico State Aggies track and field =

American college track and field team

- University: New Mexico State University
- Head coach: Joseph Rath
- Conference: C-USA
- Location: Las Cruces, New Mexico
- Outdoor track: NMSU Track and Field Complex
- Nickname: Aggies
- Colors: Crimson and white

The New Mexico State Aggies track and field team is the track and field program that represents New Mexico State University. The Aggies compete in NCAA Division I as a member of the Conference USA. The team is based in Las Cruces, New Mexico, at the NMSU Track and Field Complex.

The program is coached by Joseph Rath. The track and field program officially encompasses four teams because the NCAA considers men's and women's indoor track and field and outdoor track and field as separate sports.

Hurdler Jim Thomas was the only All-American for the Aggies, having placed 6th in the 400 meters hurdles at the 1960 NCAA track and field championships.

The men's teams were cut following the 1998 season along with the men's swim team as part of a move to save US$250,000 annually. The teams were also cut to comply with Title IX regulations.

The women's program was coached by Floyd Highfill from 1985 to 1996. They won their first Sun Belt Conference title in 2002 at the conference outdoor championships, with the team being noted for including many in-state recruits. They won again in 2004.

== Postseason ==
As of August 2025, one men's team athlete has achieved individual first-team All-American status for the team at the Division I men's outdoor, women's outdoor, men's indoor, or women's indoor national championships (using the modern criteria of top-8 placing regardless of athlete nationality).

First team NCAA All-Americans
Team	Championships	Name	Event	Place	Ref.
Men's	1960 Outdoor	Jim Thomas	400 meters hurdles	6th	

== See also ==
- Category:New Mexico State Aggies track and field coaches (4)
- Category:New Mexico State Aggies men's track and field athletes (1)
