= Oklahoma State Cowboys and Cowgirls =

Intercollegiate sports teams of Oklahoma State University

- University: Oklahoma State University
- Nickname: Cowboys; Cowgirls; Pokes
- NCAA: Division I (FBS)
- Conference: Big 12
- Athletic director: Chad Weiberg
- Location: Stillwater, Oklahoma
- Varsity teams: 18 (9 men’s and 9 women’s)
- Football stadium: Boone Pickens Stadium
- Basketball arena: Gallagher-Iba Arena
- Baseball stadium: O'Brate Stadium
- Softball stadium: Cowgirl Stadium
- Colors: Orange and black
- Mascot: Pistol Pete / Bullet
- Fight song: Ride 'Em Cowboys
- Website: okstate.com

Team NCAA championships
- 55

Individual and relay NCAA champions
- 183

Big 12 logo in Oklahoma State's colors.

The Oklahoma State Cowboys and Cowgirls are the intercollegiate athletic teams that represent Oklahoma State University, located in Stillwater. The program's mascot is a cowboy named Pistol Pete. Oklahoma State participates at the National Collegiate Athletic Association (NCAA)'s Division I Football Bowl Subdivision (FBS) as a member of the Big 12 Conference. The university's current athletic director is Chad Weiberg, who replaced the retiring Mike Holder on July 1, 2021. Oklahoma State has won 57 national championships, including 55 NCAA team national titles, which ranks sixth in most NCAA team national championships. These national titles have come in wrestling (34), golf (12), cross country (6), basketball (2), and baseball (1), and the Cowboys also claim non-NCAA national titles in football (1) and equestrian (1). In addition, Oklahoma State athletes have won 183 individual national titles.

Oklahoma State fields 18 varsity teams, 9 each for men and women. Notably, following Vanderbilt's reinstatement of women's volleyball for fall 2025, Oklahoma State is the only power conference member without a women's volleyball team.

== Athletics history and tradition ==
Prior to 1957, Oklahoma State University was known as Oklahoma A&M. As was common with most land-grant schools, its teams were known for many years as the Aggies, though they were sometimes also called the Tigers. However, in 1923, A&M was looking for a new mascot to replace its pet tiger (the inspiration behind the school colors of orange and black). A group of students saw famed cowboy Frank Eaton leading the Armistice Day parade. He was approached to see if he would be interested in being the model for the new mascot, and he agreed. The caricature adopted his nickname "Pistol Pete".

Only a few decades removed from the cattle drive era, the cowboy was still an important figure in the Southwest. The new mascot had become so popular that by 1924, Charles Saulsberry, sports editor of The Oklahoma Times, began calling A&M's teams the "Cowboys". "Aggies" and "Cowboys" were used interchangeably until A&M was elevated to university status in 1957. In 1958, the "Pistol Pete" caricature was formally adopted as Oklahoma State's mascot, though it had been used unofficially for over three decades before then.

=== The Waving Song ===
The "Waving Song" is one of the fight songs for Oklahoma State. At Oklahoma State football games, the song is played by the Cowboy Marching Band during the pregame traditions, following touchdowns, and after victories against the Cowboys' opponents. For other athletic events, the Waving Song is played after Oklahoma State victories as the start of the fight song trilogy. While the song is played, fans wave their right arms in the air; the effect is similar to wheat waving in the wind.

The song's melody is that of "The Streets of New York", a song from the Victor Herbert operetta, The Red Mill. The lyrics used by Oklahoma State were written by H.G. Seldomridge, a professor at what was then Oklahoma A&M who heard the tune on a visit to New York City. It was first sung in 1908 at a follies show at Stillwater's Grand Opera House. Ever since, it has been a tradition to play the song at Oklahoma State athletic events. The only real change over the years has been to replace "OAMC" with "Oklahoma State".

=== Conference history ===
Oklahoma A&M was a founding member of the Southwest Conference. In 1925, they moved to the Missouri Valley Intercollegiate Athletic Association. Three years later, the conference split with the six largest schools forming the Big Six and Oklahoma A&M remaining with three smaller schools to form the Missouri Valley Conference. In 1956, Oklahoma A&M went independent in anticipation of an invitation to join the Big Seven (an enlarged Big Six). In June 1957, the recently renamed Oklahoma State officially joined the Big Seven, which was renamed the Big Eight. However, Oklahoma State did not compete as part of the conference until the 1958–59 season for basketball and the 1960 season for football. Because both the MVC and the Big Eight claimed to be the direct successor of the MVIAA, some consider Oklahoma State's move to the Big Eight as rejoining the conference.

- Independent, 1901–1914
- Southwest Conference, 1914–1924
- Missouri Valley Intercollegiate Athletic Association, 1924–1927
- Missouri Valley Conference, 1927–1956
- Independent, 1956–1957
- Big Eight Conference, 1957–1995, officially joined 1957, all sports did not compete in conference play until 1960–61
- Big 12 Conference, 1996–present

== Varsity teams ==
Men's sports	Women's sports
Baseball	Basketball
Basketball	Cross country
Cross country	Equestrian
Football	Golf
Golf	Soccer
Tennis	Softball
Track and field^{†}	Tennis
Wrestling	Track and field^{†}
† – Track and field includes both indoor and outdoor

=== Basketball ===
The 1945 NCAA national championship basketball team.

==== Men's basketball ====
Oklahoma State first took the basketball court in 1908. Under head coach Henry Iba, the team won back-to-back NCAA national championships in 1945 and 1946. Oklahoma A&M center Bob Kurland was named the NCAA Tournament MVP during their two national championship seasons and became the first player to win the honor two times. In total, the Cowboys have appeared in the NCAA tournament 29 times, including a total of six Final Four appearances. They have won a total of 23 conference championships, with three of those coming in the Big 12.

Under Eddie Sutton, the team made two Final Four appearances in 1995 and again in 2004. In 2005, Oklahoma State officials announced the OSU basketball court would be named after Sutton, which it is today. The team is now coached by Steve Lutz, who was hired to the head coach position after Mike Boynton Jr was fired following the 2023-24 season.

==== Women's basketball ====
Oklahoma State first fielded a women's team during the 1972–1973 season. The Cowgirls have been to 17 NCAA tournaments, and have made 3 Sweet 16s. In 2012, Oklahoma State defeated James Madison 75–68 to win the 2012 NIT championship. They have won 3 conference championships, with tournament championships in 1990 and 1991, and a regular season conference championship in 1991. They play their games at Gallagher-Iba Arena and are coached by 3rd year head coach, Jacie Hoyt.

=== Baseball ===
Oklahoma State won their only national championship in 1959, but have finished runner-up on five other occasions. Overall, the Cowboys have reached the NCAA baseball tournament 49 times and made 20 College World Series appearances, including seven straight trips to Omaha from 1981 to 1987. Oklahoma State has also won 26 conference tournament titles to go along with 25 regular season conference titles, including 16 consecutive conference championships (1981-1996) under head coach Gary Ward in the Big 8 Conference. During that time, Pete Incaviglia was named Baseball America's Player of the Century, and Robin Ventura was inducted in the inaugural class into the College Baseball Hall of Fame.

The Cowboys' current head baseball coach is Josh Holliday.

=== Cross Country ===
==== Men's Cross Country ====
Oklahoma State men's cross country won NCAA national championships in 1954, 2009, 2010, 2012, 2023 and 2025. In addition to the 6 NCAA championships, OSU cross country has won 18 conference titles, including 9 straight Big 12 titles from 2008–16, with their most recent title coming in 2025. 13 individual conference champion runners have come from Oklahoma State, including Brian Musau in 2023 and 2024. The OSU cross country program has also produced 68 All-American runners. The Cowboys run at the Greiner Family OSU Cross Country Course, and are led by 12-time Big 12 Men's Coach of the Year, Dave Smith.

==== Women's Cross Country ====
The Oklahoma State women's cross country program has been a powerhouse in recent years, winning Big 12 conference titles in 2015, 2019, 2021, and 2022 to go along with their 1986 Big 8 conference title. There have been 7 Cowgirls who have been crowned individual Big 12 champion, with Taylor Roe becoming the first Big 12 individual conference champion from OSU when she won in 2023, breaking a 34 year drought. At the 2023 NCAA Cross Country Championships, Oklahoma State claimed a 3rd place finish, only 33 points behind the winners, the best finish ever for the women's cross country team. 24 Cowgirls have won the All-American award, and 2 Olympians have hailed from OSU. The Cowgirls run at the Greiner Family OSU Cross Country Course, and are led by 5-time Big 12 Women's Coach of the Year, Dave Smith.

=== Equestrian ===
Oklahoma State women's equestrian competes in the Big 12 conference, alongside Baylor, Fresno State, and TCU. The Cowgirl equestrian team has had major success in recent years, winning 12 conference titles (2009, 2012, 2013, 2014, 2016, 2018, 2021, 2022, 2023, 2024, 2025, 2026). They have also had NCEA title success, winning 5 NCEA Western national titles in 2000, 2003, 2004, 2006 and 2013. However, they were unable to win the overall national title until 2022, when they defeated Texas A&M 11–9 to claim their first NCEA Dual Discipline national title. Oklahoma State equestrian competes at the Pedigo-Hull Equestrian Center, and are led by 5-time Big 12 Coach of the Year, Larry Sanchez.

=== Football ===
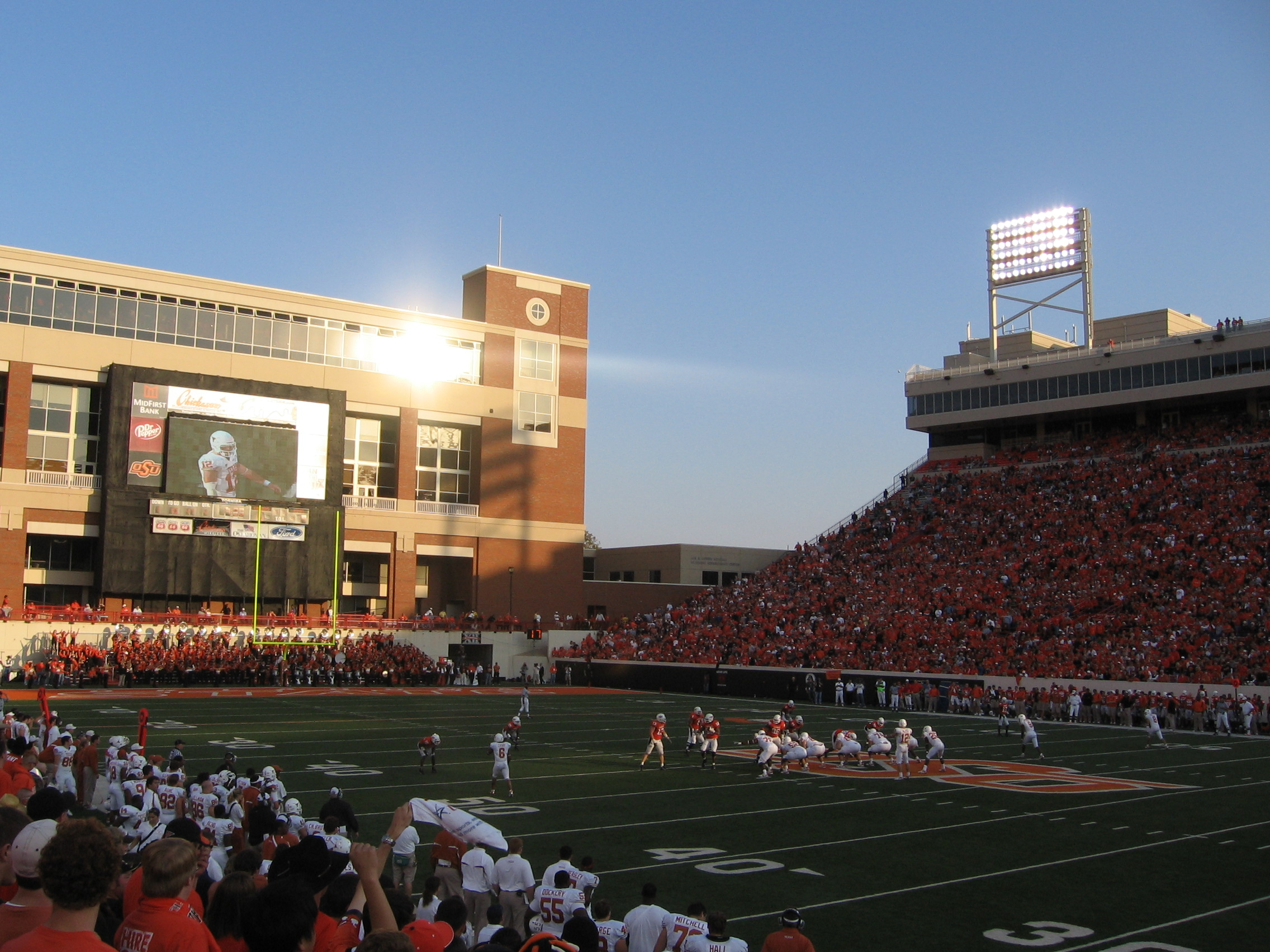
Texas at Oklahoma State University, 2007

The 1945 Oklahoma A&M team was retroactively awarded the AFCA national championship and The Coaches' Trophy in October 2016 by the American Football Coaches Association. The Aggies finished with a 9–0 record, completing the season with a 33–13 win over St. Mary's College in the Sugar Bowl. The Cowboys have won 11 conference championships, along with victories in 3 Fiesta Bowls, 1 Sugar Bowl, and 1 Cotton Bowl. The Oklahoma State football program has participated in 34 bowl games overall, amassing a 22–12 record, with their most recent bowl appearance being a 31-23 victory over Texas A&M in the 2023 Texas Bowl.

Barry Sanders won the Heisman Trophy in 1988. Other individual honors by Oklahoma State football players include 2 NFL Hall of Fame members, 65 All-Americans, 170 NFL Draft picks, and 21 first round NFL Draft picks to the Cowboys' name.

The current head coach is Eric Morris, who was named head coach after Mike Gundy was fired following the Cowboys' home loss to Tulsa in the team's third game of the 2025 season. Gundy ended his OK State career with an overall record of 170–90 and a 12–6 record in bowl appearances. During Gundy's coaching career, the Cowboys enjoyed ten 9+ win seasons. Gundy coached the team to a record 12-win season in 2011, culminating with a Fiesta Bowl victory over Stanford, and ten years later led Oklahoma State to another 12-win season and Fiesta Bowl victory, this time over Notre Dame. His accolades consist of the 2011 Eddie Robinson National Coach of the Year, 2011 Paul "Bear" Bryant National Coach of the Year, and the 2011 American Football Monthly National Coach of the Year. He also has won Big 12 Coach of the Year three times (2010, 2021, 2023).

Oklahoma State plays football on Lewis Field, in Boone Pickens Stadium, and the Cowboys all-time record is 643–593–48.

=== Golf ===
==== Men's Golf ====
The Oklahoma State men's golf program is one of the most illustrious in the country, having won 12 NCAA national championships in 1963, 1976, 1978, 1980, 1983, 1987, 1991, 1995, 2000, 2006, 2018 and 2025. In addition, ten Oklahoma State golfers have won individual national championships, (Earl Moeller in 1953, Grier Jones in 1968, David Edwards in 1978, Scott Verplank in 1986, Brian Watts in 1987, E. J. Pfister in 1988, Charles Howell III in 2000, Jonathan Moore in 2006, Matthew Wolff in 2019 and Preston Stout in 2026).

The program has qualified for the NCAA Championship 76 times in 78 years – only missing the tournament twice since 1947. In addition to NCAA success, the Cowboys have won a total of 58 conference championships across three conferences.

Karsten Creek serves as the home course of the Oklahoma State University men's golf team. The Tom Fazio layout was named Golf Digest's "Best New Public Course" and served as the host site for the NCAA Men's Championship in 2003, 2011, and 2018. The Cowboys won their 11th national title at their home course in 2018.

Conference championships:

  - Missouri Valley Conference (9): 1947, 1948, 1949, 1950, 1951, 1952, 1953, 1954, 1955
  - Big Eight Conference (36): 1958, 1959, 1960, 1961, 1962, 1963, 1964, 1965, 1966, 1967, 1969, 1970, 1971, 1972, 1973, 1974, 1975, 1976, 1977, 1978, 1979, 1980, 1981, 1982, 1983, 1985, 1986, 1987, 1988, 1989, 1990, 1991, 1993, 1994, 1995, 1996
  - Big 12 Conference (13): 1997, 1998, 2000, 2005, 2007, 2008, 2009, 2010, 2011, 2019, 2021, 2025, 2026

==== Women's Golf ====
The women's program has also had its share of success. The Cowgirls have made 26 NCAA Championship appearances, with their best results being runner-up finishes in 2004 and 2021. In addition, Oklahoma State women's golf has won 25 conference titles, including 11 Big 12 championships, the most in the conference. Individually, 30 Cowgirl golfers have received All-American honors.

Karsten Creek serves as the home course of the Oklahoma State University women's golf team. The Tom Fazio layout was named Golf Digest's "Best New Public Course" and served as the host site for the NCAA Men's Championship in 2003, 2011, and 2018.

Conference championships:

  - Big Eight Conference (14): 1977, 1979, 1980, 1982, 1984, 1985, 1986, 1987, 1988, 1989, 1992, 1994, 1995, 1996
  - Big 12 Conference (11): 1999, 2001, 2002, 2003, 2005, 2008, 2009, 2013, 2016, 2021, 2023

=== Soccer ===
The Oklahoma State Cowgirls soccer team has won the Big 12 conference tournament in 2003, 2009, and 2010, and the regular season conference title in 2008, 2011, 2017, and 2019. The Cowgirls have appeared in the Women's College Cup 14 times, including Elite Eight appearances in the 2010 and 2011 tournaments.

The Cowgirls' goalkeeper for those runs, Adrianna Franch, recorded a program-record 36 shutouts and was the first Oklahoma State player to be called up to the United States women's national soccer team, where she was a member of the 2019 FIFA Women's World Cup championship-winning squad.

=== Softball ===
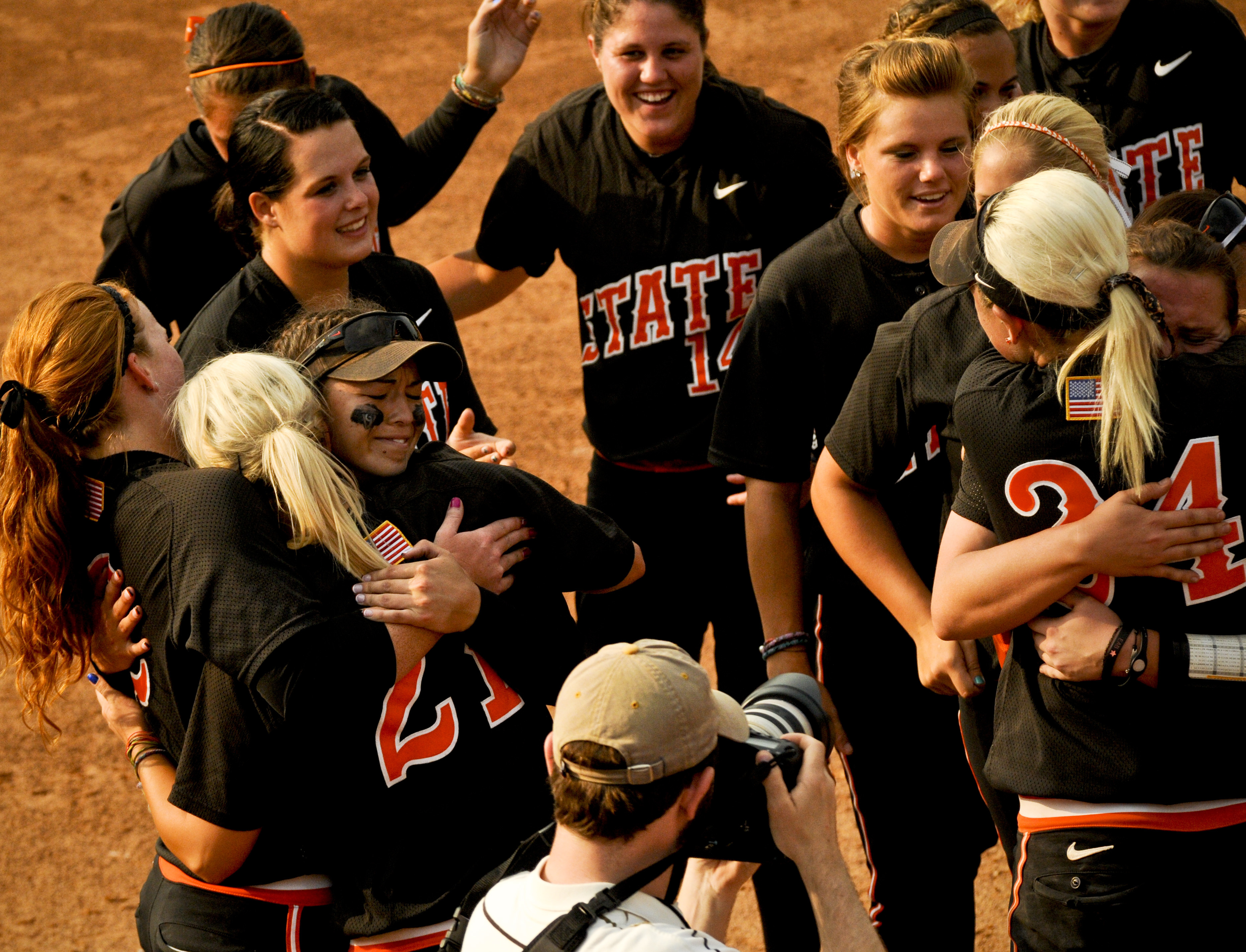
Cowgirls softball players celebrate a win during the 2011 NCAA Division I softball tournament

Oklahoma State's softball team has appeared in sixteen Women's College World Series, in 1977, 1980, 1981, 1982 (AIAW), 1982 (NCAA), 1989, 1990, 1993, 1994, 1998, 2011, 2019, 2021, 2022, 2023 and 2024. In 1982, the Cowgirls played in both the last AIAW WCWS and days later the first NCAA WCWS. After having played their way through the 1982 regular season, a conference tournament, NCAA first round, winning an AIAW regional title, a loss in the AIAW WCWS final, the team's marathon season ended with 13-inning and 14-inning one-run losses in the NCAA tournament.

In addition to national success, Oklahoma State softball has won 9 regular season conference titles and won the 2022 Big 12 tournament title over rival Oklahoma. They are coached by 10th year head coach Kenny Gajewski.

=== Tennis ===
==== Men's Tennis ====
The Oklahoma State men's tennis program has won 24 total conference championships, with 21 coming from the Big 8 conference. The Cowboys have been to 26 NCAA Tournaments, with the most recent appearance being in 2024. Their highest final ITA ranking was 11th, which was achieved in the 2006-07 season. The Cowboys also boast having 20 All-Americans and 40 individual Big 12 Champions. Oklahoma State men's tennis plays their matches at the Greenwood Tennis Center, and are coached by 3rd year head coach Dustin Taylor.

==== Women's Tennis ====
The Oklahoma State women's tennis program has won 30 total conference championships, including eight Big 12 titles. The Cowgirls have been to 26 NCAA Tournaments, with the most recent appearance being in 2025. The Cowgirls boast having 24 All-Americans and 28 individual Big 12 Champions. Oklahoma State women's tennis plays their matches at the Greenwood Tennis Center, and are coached by 16th year head coach Chris Young.

In 2016, OSU made it to the national championship match against Stanford, where they fell 4–3. In 2024, they won the ITA National Indoor Championship, defeating Michigan 4–3, and went on to finish the season 29–1, the best season in Oklahoma State history.

=== Track and field ===
==== Men's track and field ====
The Oklahoma State Men's Indoor Track and Field team has won the Big 12 conference title twice, in 2014 and 2016. 13 Cowboys have won individual NCAA titles, and Oklahoma State has been to 33 NCAA Men's Indoor Championships, with their best result being a 2nd place finish in 1965.

The Oklahoma State Men's Outdoor Track and Field team has won 20 conference titles, all coming during their time in the Missouri Valley Conference. 16 Cowboys have won individual NCAA titles, and Oklahoma State has been to 53 NCAA Men's Outdoor Championships, with their best result being a 5th place finish in 1959. Both teams are coached by Dave Smith.

==== Women's track and field ====
The Oklahoma State Women's Indoor Track and Field team won their first conference championship in 2023, scoring 146 points to win the Big 12 title. 5 Cowgirls have won individual NCAA titles, and Oklahoma State has been to 25 NCAA Women's Indoor Championships, with their best result being an 8th place finish in 2024.

The Oklahoma State Women's Outdoor Track and Field team has never won a conference title, however 3 Cowgirls have won individual NCAA titles, and Oklahoma State has been to 24 NCAA Women's Outdoor Championships, with their best result being a 12th place finish in 2016. Both teams are coached by Dave Smith.

=== Wrestling ===
Oklahoma State wrestling's tradition started in 1916 when Edward C. Gallagher, whose name is part of Gallagher-Iba Arena, became head coach. With his expertise in anatomy, he pioneered the sport of wrestling. Gallagher coached the Cowboys until his death in 1940 from pneumonia. During those 24 years, Gallagher had 11 team national titles, 19 undefeated seasons, and a 138–5–4 record.

After Gallagher's death, Art Griffith took over and proceeded to win two straight national championships. Due to World War II, Oklahoma State wrestling was forced off the mat for three years. After the war, Griffith coached for another 11 years and won six more national championships in that time. Due to health reasons, Art Griffith resigned as head coach and Myron Roderick took over. At 23 years old, Roderick became the youngest coach to win a national championship in 1958. Roderick proceeded to win another 5 championships. In 1970, Myron Roderick stepped down to take an executive position with the U.S. Wrestling Federation. Former Stillwater High School coach Tommy Chesbro was hired as head coach and won eight Big Eight titles and one national championship in 15 years. Between 1985 and 1991, Joe Seay, former Cal State coach won five conference titles and two national titles. In 1993, John Smith became the seventh head coach of Oklahoma State University wrestling. Smith led the Cowboys to a national title in 1995 and four consecutive national titles between 2002 and 2006. Smith retired in 2024 and was replaced by 2020 Olympic Gold Medalist David Taylor.

Overall, the Oklahoma State wrestling program has won 34 NCAA national championships, along with 56 conference championships, 145 individual champions and 488 All-Americans.

== Notable non-varsity sports ==
=== Cheerleading ===
The Oklahoma State University Cheerleaders compete in the National Cheerleaders Association in Division 1A coached by Lindsay Saloitte.

They have won 16 NCA national team championships and two group stunt national championships in the following divisions:

NCA Large Co-Ed Div. 1A – 2021, 2022

NCA Cheer Division 1A – 1988, 1991, 2010, 2012, 2013, 2014, 2015

NCA All-Girl 1 – 1988, 1990, 1995, 1996

NCA Small Co-Ed 1A – 2012, 2019

NCA Small Co-Ed 1 – 2007

NCA Group Stunts – 2014, 2015

=== Hockey ===
The current Oklahoma State hockey team was established in the fall of 2021, and they compete as members of the American Collegiate Hockey Association. The team trains and plays roughly 80 miles away in Tulsa as there is no permanent ice rink in Stillwater; practices are held at the WeStreet Ice Center while games are split between WeStreet and the BOK Center downtown. The Cowboys take part in annual games against the Oklahoma Sooners in the “Bedlam on Ice” series. In 2026, the Cowboys advanced to the ACHA Division II National Championship Game where they finished runner-up to Florida Gulf Coast University in a tightly-contested match that went to overtime. Since its launch the program has become highly popular among students and the OSU community, to the extent that the athletic department scheduled an outdoor Bedlam matchup at Boone Pickens Stadium in January 2027.

=== Rugby ===
Founded in 1974, the Oklahoma State University Rugby Football Club plays college rugby in the Division 1 Heart of America conference against several of its traditional Big 8 / Big 12 rivals. The Cowboys are led by head coach Miles Hunter. Oklahoma State also has a women's rugby team that plays in the Mid-America college rugby conference.

=== STUNT ===
The Oklahoma State University STUNT team competes in Stunt (sport) Division 1A, and are coached by Lindsay Saloitte.

They have won 10 national team championships in the following years: 2014, 2015, 2016, 2017, 2018, 2019, 2021, 2022, 2024, 2025.

== Championships ==
=== NCAA team championships ===
Oklahoma State has won 55 NCAA team national championships.

- Men's (55)
  - Baseball (1): 1959
  - Basketball (2): 1945, 1946
  - Cross Country (6): 1954, 2009, 2010, 2012, 2023, 2025
  - Golf (12): 1963, 1976, 1978, 1980, 1983, 1987, 1991, 1995, 2000, 2006, 2018, 2025
  - Wrestling (34): 1928*, 1929, 1930, 1931*, 1933*, 1934, 1935, 1937, 1938, 1939, 1940, 1941, 1942, 1946, 1948, 1949, 1954, 1955, 1956, 1958, 1959, 1961, 1962, 1964, 1966, 1968, 1971, 1989, 1990, 1994, 2003, 2004, 2005, 2006
- See also:
  - Big 12 Conference national team titles
  - List of NCAA schools with the most NCAA Division I championships

=== Other national team championships ===
Listed below are seven national team titles in current and emerging NCAA sports that were not awarded by the NCAA.

- Men's (1)
  - Football (1): 1945
- Women's (6)
  - Equestrian:
    - (Varsity Western) (4): 2003, 2004, 2006, 2013
    - (Dual discipline) (1): 2022
  - Tennis (1): 2024^{a}

^{a} ITA National Indoor Championship

Below are five national team titles won by Oklahoma State teams at the highest collegiate levels in non-NCAA sports:

- All (5)
  - Equestrian (AQHA western) (1): 2000
  - Flying (aviation) (2): 1971, 1975
  - Rodeo (women's) (2): 2001, 2004
- See also:
  - List of NCAA schools with the most Division I national championships
  - Intercollegiate sports team champions

== See also ==
- List of Oklahoma State University Olympians
