= Pistol Pete (New Mexico State University) =

US university athletics logo

- Conference: C-USA
- Description: Person in cowboy hat, vest, and chaps, twirling pistols
- First seen: 1958

NMSU's athletics logo has been a caricature of Old West gunfighter and lawman Frank "Pistol Pete" Eaton. Pistol Pete is portrayed by a NMSU student dressed in traditional cowboy attire, including a cowboy hat, a vest, and chaps, and armed with twirling pistols. NMSU licenses Pistol Pete from Oklahoma State University for $10/year as part of a settlement of a copyright infringement lawsuit.

== Controversy ==
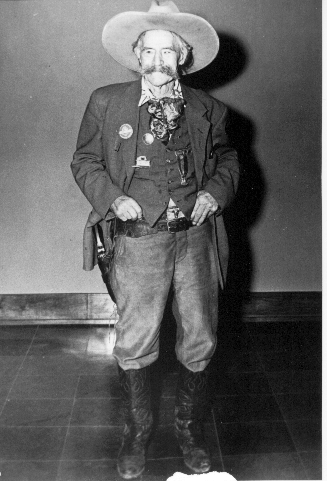
Frank "Pistol Pete" Eaton, the inspiration for the mascot

=== The statue controversy ===
A proposed new statue of Pistol Pete at the entrance of NMSU was dropped in 2019 amid controversy, as some faculty opposed the statue as inappropriate.

=== Lasso Larry Debacle ===
Pistol Pete was disarmed in 2005 as part of a plan to rebrand the university on the national stage. Pete's pistol was replaced with a lasso, and his name was briefly officially abbreviated to simply "Pete." The costumed mascot seen at games also lost his six shooters and holster belt in favor of a lasso. The disarming of Pete led to a massive uproar among alumni and outsiders demanding the return of Pete's guns. Popular T-shirts worn around campus featured the old Pistol Pete logo modified to show an oversized gun in his hand, with the slogan “Who Brings a Lasso to a Gunfight?” The decision was criticized by Fox News anchor Bill O'Reilly during his "Most Ridiculous Item of the Day" segment. The most popular nickname given to the widely unpopular new mascot was "Lasso Larry."

=== Revival of Pistol Pete ===
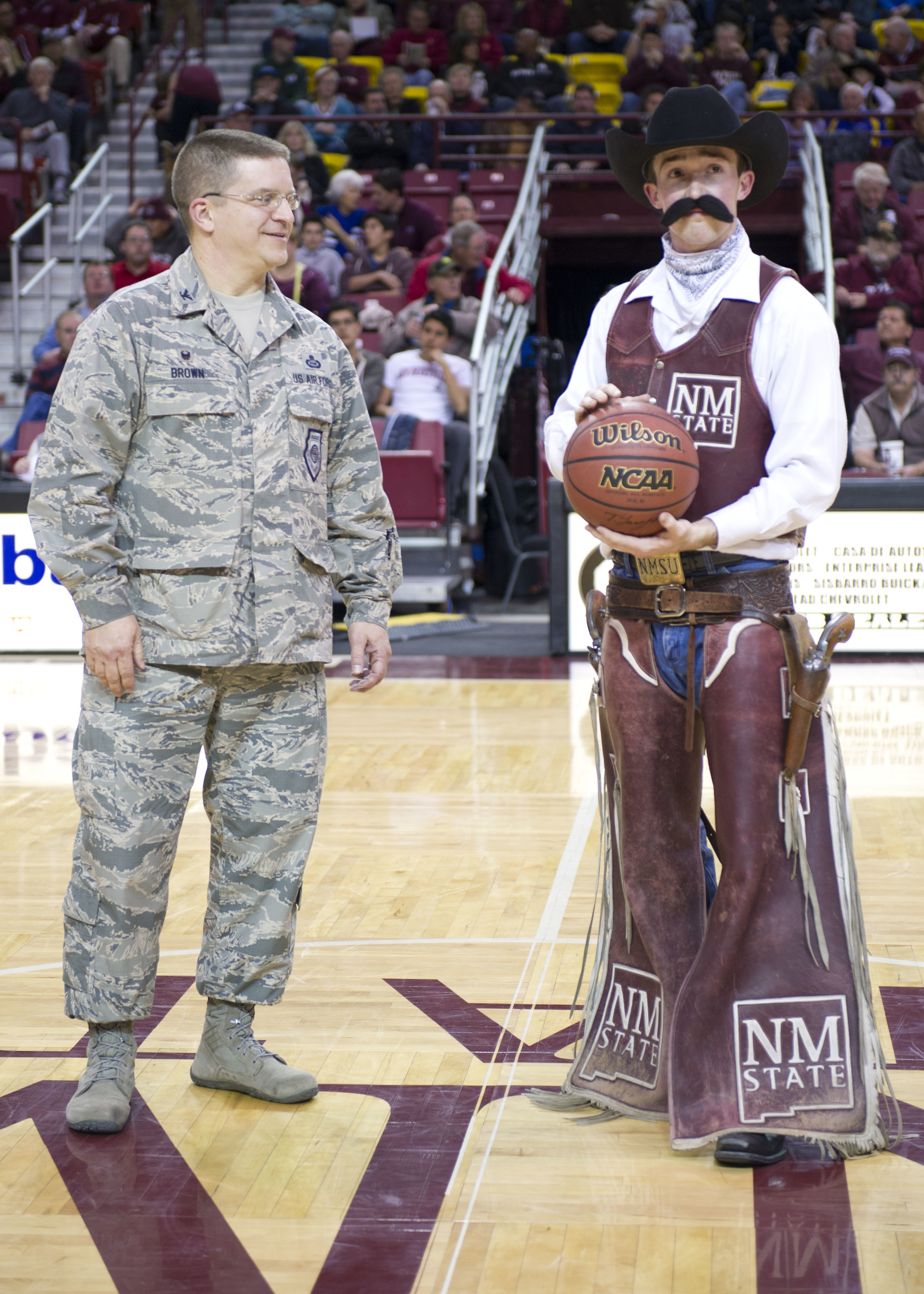
Pistol Pete at NMSU Military Appreciation Night

After one year the university revamped the cartoonish mascot in favor of a real student dressed in more traditional cowboy attire, carrying a holster belt and six shooters, and wearing a black cowboy hat. The "Pistol Pete" name was also restored. In 2007, NMSU modified the logo to remove the lasso and once again depict Pistol Pete carrying pistols, and this is now the official athletics logo.

=== Suspension ===
In 2009, the Pistol Pete mascot was suspended for one game by the Western Athletic Conference for fighting with Utah State's mascot, Big Blue, during a 2009 WAC men's basketball tournament game.
