= Eastern Flyer =

Technical
- Track gauge: 1,435 mm (4 ft 8 1/2 in)
- Length: 97.5 mi (156.9 km)

The Eastern Flyer was a proposed medium distance inter-city train traveling between Oklahoma City in central Oklahoma and Tulsa in north-eastern Oklahoma. It was originally planned to be a private operation by the Iowa Pacific Railroad, and its services were to have included a dome car, coaches and full meal service. This would have been the first regular passenger service to Tulsa since the Santa Fe discontinued service in 1971.

== Demonstration runs ==
Initial commercial demonstration test trips were conducted in February 2014, running between Oklahoma City and the Tulsa suburb of Sapulpa with stops in Stroud and Bristow. In late 2014, Iowa Pacific offered one-hour Polar Express excursions on the Eastern Flyer out of Bristow, inspired by the children's book and film of the same name, to promote the service. In March 2015, service was estimated to begin in May or "early summer", with rail service from Sapulpa to Midwest City, with bus shuttles on each end. In June, Iowa Pacific said the start date would be further delayed, as both Oklahoma City and Tulsa considered efforts to facilitate rail service connecting the cities' downtowns.

== Service falls through ==
The original promoter of the service, Iowa Pacific, dropped out of the process. Its partner in the project, the Stillwater Central Railroad, an indirect subsidiary of Watco, came into the process when it purchased a nearly 100-mile-long railroad line, known as the Sooner Sub, from the state of Oklahoma in 2014. That line runs from Sapulpa near Tulsa to Del City near Oklahoma City. The contract included a requirement to start a six-month daily passenger service trial run before August 2019, with a financial penalty for not meeting the deadline set at $2.8 million. With Iowa Pacific no longer involved, in June of 2018, the Stillwater Central, being only a freight operator, issued a request for proposal to begin the process of securing another private rail carrier to provide the passenger service. The terms included an initial period of 10 years, and involved only the route between Sapulpa and Del City, but with the expectation of working with city officials to expand service to the downtowns of both Tulsa and Oklahoma City.

Government officials were not optimistic that the original August 2019 deadline would be met. On August 5, 2019, the Stillwater Central opted to default under the contract and pay the $2.8 million penalty for not establishing the service.

== Future of passenger rail service in Northeast Oklahoma ==
The original sale agreement with Stillwater Central called for the state to retain the right to acquire a passenger rail easement should the company decide not to operate such a service after 10 years. The sale agreement also required the line be accessible to other rail companies, and that within seven years the Stillwater Central upgrade the line, from Class II to Class III, to enable trains to safely travel at faster speeds. Class III permits freight traffic up to 40 mph and passenger traffic up to 60 mph. Stillwater Central has upgraded the rail line as agreed. So future passenger rail projects over the Sooner Sub by another party remain possible.

Part of the impetus for the project was the possibility of interconnecting with Amtrak's Heartland Flyer at Oklahoma City for linking to the Texas Eagle at Fort Worth and hence the rest of the Amtrak system. Concerns about the continuing viability of the Heartland Flyer were voiced from time to time, as when in 2016 issues were raised centering on the subsidies paid by the states of Oklahoma and Texas for the service. The route remained in operation, and expansion was even discussed with respect to extending the line from Oklahoma City to Newton, Kansas, to connect to Amtrak's Southwest Chief, a proposal backed for many years by a group called the Northern Flyer Alliance. But in 2025, the Texas legislature declined to provide the requested $7.05 million in Heartland Flyer funding for the 2025-2027 period, which could've led to the existing service being cut by October 1, 2025. The North Central Texas Council of Governments awarded $3.5 million from its Regional Toll Revenue allocations to keep the train running into 2026. However, in 2026, the TxDOT indicated the state of Texas did not have the funding available to continue its portion of the service, and Oklahoma lawmakers were not including funding in Oklahoma’s appropriations bill. However, by September of 2026, agencies in both states had secured funding at least through 2027.

In the more optimistic time of June of 2023, Oklahoma and Kansas state officials began seeking federal approval and funding to extend the Heartland Flyer from Oklahoma City to Newton, but were not pursuing an Oklahoma City to Tulsa route. Nevertheless, ODOT officials claimed that the Tulsa route remained a long-range goal. The condition of the existing rails was said to be better between OKC and Newton compared to between OKC and Tulsa, the latter being cited as a reason for the difficulty in getting rail service to Tulsa.

In early 2024, the Federal Railroad Administration released an interim report on its ongoing Amtrak Daily Long-Distance Service Study, regarding fifteen new or previously discontinued rail routes under consideration for federal funding. This study included a proposed route from Oklahoma City to Tulsa, and on from Tulsa to St. Louis in one direction and Kansas City in another. Separately, Oklahoma and Kansas continued to the second phase of the study on extending the Heartland Flyer route from Oklahoma City to Newton, Kansas. In mid-2024, the U.S. High Speed Rail Association, a lobby group, put forward a four-phase plan to build out the U.S. rail network, envisioning a 220-mph high-speed Tulsa to Oklahoma City connection as part of Phase 2, with a high-speed connection from Tulsa to Kansas City added in Phase 3, and 110-mph rail links between Tulsa and both St. Louis and Little Rock included at some point.
