= Maejo University =

University in Sansai, Chiang Mai, Thailand

- มหาวิทยาลัยแม่โจ้
- Motto: งานหนักไม่เคยฆ่าคน (RTGS: Ngan Nak Mai Khoei Kha Khon)
- Motto in English: Hard Work Never Kills Anyone
- Type: Autonomous public university
- Established: 1996 as Maejo University (1934 as the Northern Agricultural Teachers Training School)
- Affiliations: ASAIHL
- President: Assoc. Prof. Weerapon Thongma, Ph.D.
- Royal conferrer: Chulabhorn Walailak, Princess Srisavangavadhana on behalf of the King
- Location: Sansai, Chiang Mai, Thailand; 18°53′43″N 99°00′49″E
- Mascot: Pistol Pete
- Website: www.mju.ac.th

Maejo University (MJU; also spelled Maecho University; Thai: มหาวิทยาลัยแม่โจ้; RTGS: Mahawitthayalai Mae Cho) in Chiang Mai Province, Thailand, is the oldest agricultural institution in the country. Founded in 1934 as the Northern Agricultural Teachers Training School, it was restructured and renamed several times until it gained the status of a full-fledged public university in 1996 and since then has been known as Maejo University.

Maejo University main campus at Chiang Mai is composed of the faculties of Business, Economics, Liberal Arts, Tourism Development, Information Technology, Fisheries Technology and Aquatic Resources, Animal Sciences and Technology, Renewable Energy, Administrative, Landscape and Environmental Design, Agricultural Production, Science, and Engineering and Agro-Industry. In addition to these, the university has two smaller campuses in Phrae and Chumphon.

== Logo ==
Inside a ring with "Maejo" in Thai and English, the logo depicts Thailand's symbol of agriculture, the lord of rain Phra Phirune mounted on a Nāga (พระพิรุณทรงนาค). The symbol may be seen at Google images.

== Mascot ==
Every centre of learning in Thailand has its genius loci and many have a tutelary deity, but Maejo adopted the Pistol Pete (Oklahoma State University) mascot following Oklahoma State's 2005 Distinguished International Alumni Award to President Thep Phongparnich.
