= James Sapulpa =

Confederate Army officer, blacksmith, and rancher

Chief Sapulpa

Member of the Muscogee Nation House of Kings
- In office 1868 – March 17, 1887

Personal details
- Born: James Sapulpa c. 1812-1824 Alabama, U.S.
- Died: March 17, 1887 Muscogee Nation, Indian Territory, U.S.
- Resting place: Sapulpa family Cemetery
- Citizenship: Muscogee Nation
- Occupation: blacksmith, rancher, politician

Military service
- Allegiance: CSA
- Branch/service: Confederate Army
- Years of service: 1861-1864
- Rank: first lieutenant

James Sapulpa (also known as Chief Sapulpa; (Note: Chief was a nickname for Sapulpa, not a title.)c.1824 – March 17, 1887) was a Muscogee blacksmith, rancher, and a Confederate States of America officer who is best known as the first permanent resident and namesake of Sapulpa, Oklahoma. He served in the Muscogee Nation House of Kings from 1868 until his death.

== Biography ==
There is conflicting evidence for James Sapulpa's birthdate. His tombstone lists c. 1812 while his American Civil War discharge paperwork puts his birthdate in 1824. His father was named Omiya and his mother's name is not known. He was a member of the Kasihta tribe within the Muscogee Nation. He was born in Alabama.

Around 1840, Sapulpa moved to Indian Territory, originally settling in Okmulgee before moving to what would become Sapulpa. In 1850, he opened a blacksmith store. During the American Civil War, he loaned $1,000 to the Confederate States of America and served in the Creek Regiment of the Confederate Army as a first lieutenant. He was discharged in 1864.

In 1868, Sapulpa was elected to the Muscogee Nation's House of Kings (one of two houses in the nation's bicameral legislature at the time) and served until his death.

In 1872, he opened a new blacksmith store and contracted with the Sac and Fox Agency. Sapulpa devoted much of the rest of his life to ranching. In 1883, the railroad reached Sapulpa and, during a visit to Tulsa in 1886, he received the nickname "Chief" from Frisco rail employees.

== Family, death, and legacy ==
Sapulpa married three times: Tenofe (with whom he had no children and later separated), NaKitty, and Chopok-sa. He had three children with NaKitty: James, Sarah, and Hannah. With Chopok-sa he had seven children: Moses, Yarna, Samuel, William, Rhoda, Rebecca, and Nicey. Sapulpa died on March 17, 1887, in Indian Territory.

The town of Sapulpa, Oklahoma, is named after him.
