= Bridge No. 18 at Rock Creek =

Historic Route 66 bridge in Oklahoma, United States

- U.S. National Register of Historic Places
- Rock Creek Bridge No. 18 w/period-appropriate pickup truck, as seen in August of 2026
- Location: 13000 W. Ozark Trail, Sapulpa, Oklahoma
- Coordinates: 35°59′37″N 96°08′11″W
- Area: 18-foot-wide by 120 feet long
- Built: 1921
- Architectural style: Parker Through Truss
- NRHP reference No.: 95000031
- Added to NRHP: February 23, 1995

Bridge No. 18 at Rock Creek, also known as the Rock Creek Bridge and as Bridge No. 18 at Rock Creek Park, is located in Sapulpa, Oklahoma within Creek County, State of Oklahoma. It was constructed in the 1921-1924 timeframe, quickly becoming part of U.S. Route 66 when that federal highway was designated in 1926. On February 23, 1995, the bridge was put on the National Register of Historic Places listings in Creek County, Oklahoma with number 95000031, under the criteria of Event as well as Architecture/Engineering. It has since become the centerpiece of a Route 66-themed park.

== History ==
The bridge was built by Creek County, although sources differ as to whether this was in 1921 or 1924. It was incorporated into what was then Oklahoma State Highway 7 which was originally created in 1921—one of eastern Oklahoma's few paved roads at the time—and also incorporated into the Ozark Trail, a privately designated multistate route running from St. Louis, Missouri, to El Paso, Texas and Santa Fe, New Mexico. In 1926, the bridge was added to the mileage of Route 66, a federally-designated highway connecting Chicago and Santa Monica largely by linking existing regional roads into a continuous transcontinental strip. This usage continued until 1952, when the bridge was bypassed by a new concrete-slab bridge constructed about a quarter of mile east. The old bridge remained in place, however, usable along the old alignment. It was added to the National Register of Historic Places on February 23, 1995. The bridge was forced to be closed due to aging issues in March 2013, but it was reopened in 2015 after repairs but subject to weight and height limitations. After years of various issues, it was finally closed completely to vehicles in 2023, but was reopened to pedestrians in 2026.

== Construction ==
Side view of Bridge 18 over Rock Creek

The structure, 18 feet wide and 120 feet in length, is a Parker Through Truss bridge, being a type of steel bridge used extensively along Route 66 where large bridges were needed. It is a subtype of a Pratt Truss featuring a polygonal top chord, with the Pratt Truss having been created in 1844 and used until about the beginning of World War II. The Rock Creek Bridge is unusual in that it utilizes bricks for its decking. Few Parker Through Truss bridges still remain along the old route.

== Park ==
To celebrate the bridge in time for Route 66's 2026 centennial celebrations, the State provided a $2 million grant to rehabilitate the bridge for pedestrian use and create a park around it complete with sidewalks, decorative Route 66 signage, and play areas. The park opened in April 2026.

Park entrance

Plaza entrance

Signage at Bridge No. 18 Park in August 2026
