= St. Louis and Oklahoma City Railroad =

Overview
- Locale: Oklahoma
- Dates of operation: 1895–1899
- Successor: St. Louis and San Francisco Railway

Technical
- Track gauge: 4 ft 8 1/2 in (1,435 mm) standard gauge
- Length: 103.2 miles (166.1 km)

The St. Louis and Oklahoma City Railroad (STLOC) was a railway existing between its corporate formation in 1895 and the conveyance of all its assets to a predecessor of the St. Louis and San Francisco Railway (Frisco) in 1899. STLOC built a line between Sapulpa and Oklahoma City in 1898, being 103.2 miles in length.

== History ==
A Frisco predecessor, the Atlantic and Pacific Railroad, had built into Sapulpa in the 1885-1886 timeframe. Against that backdrop, two Oklahoma City businessmen incorporated STLOC on November 20, 1895, under the laws of the then Territory of Oklahoma, for the purpose of running a line from Sapulpa to Oklahoma City. However, they completed no actual construction by February 10, 1898, on which date they passed control of the company to the railroad's construction contractor, Indianoma Construction Company. The contractor on the same date agreed to sell STLOC to another Frisco predecessor, the St. Louis and San Francisco Railroad Company, when the trackage was finished.

In that same year of 1898, STLOC completed the 103.2 miles of standard gauge, single track railroad from Sapulpa to Oklahoma City. STLOC was then sold in accordance with the previous agreement on January 1, 1899, with a formal conveyance by STLOC of all its property to the St. Louis and San Francisco Railroad Company on March 28, 1899. The St. Louis and San Francisco Railroad Company was in turn sold under foreclosure to the Frisco on September 15, 1916.

The railroad trackage is still in existence, and is now operated by the Stillwater Central Railroad.
