= Pistol Pete (Oklahoma State University) =

Athletics mascot

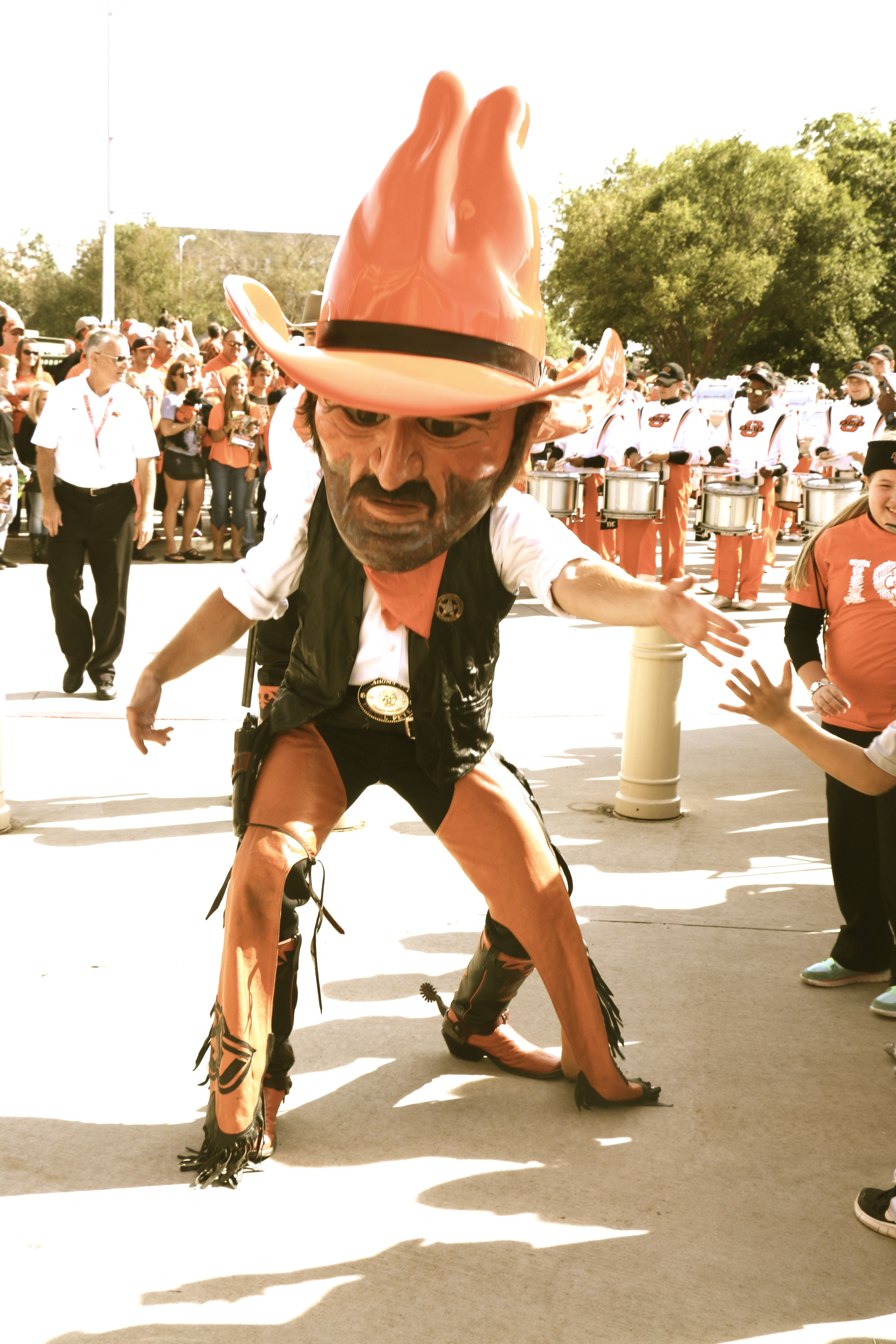
Pistol Pete in 2014

Pistol Pete is the athletics mascot of Oklahoma State University. The Pistol Pete mascot costume features traditional cowboy attire and a headpiece resembling Frank Eaton. Pistol Pete has been the mascot for the Oklahoma State Cowboys since 1923.

== History ==
From the 1890s on, Oklahoma A&M sports teams had been referred to as the Agriculturists or Aggies, the Farmers, and officially but unpopularly, the Tigers. By 1924 Charles Saulsberry, sports editor of the Oklahoma City Times, and other writers who regularly covered college events had begun to refer to Stillwater's teams as the A&M Cowboys. The Athletic Council authorized Athletic Director Edward C. Gallagher to have 2,000 balloons printed, "Oklahoma Aggies - Ride 'Em Cowboy" for sale at football games in 1926.

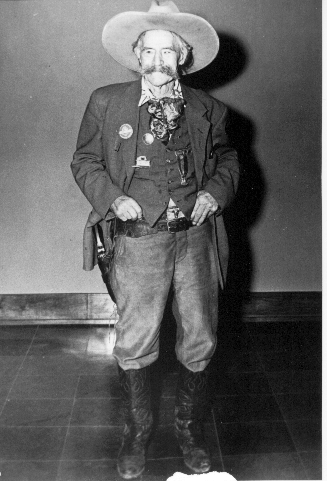
Frank Eaton, the inspiration for Pistol Pete

Around 1923, when Oklahoma A&M College was searching for a new mascot to replace their tiger (which had been copied from Princeton and accounts for the orange and black school colors), a group of students saw Frank Eaton leading Stillwater's Armistice Day Parade.

He was approached to see if he would be interested in being the model for the new mascot, and he agreed. A likeness was drawn and began to be used on sweatshirts, stickers, etc. and a tradition was born. That caricature was the basis for what is used today as the official Oklahoma State University mascot. For thirty-five years, the crusty old cowboy was a living symbol of OSU, representing the colorful past of the area. As such, he would attend OSU athletic events, building dedications, etc., and sign autographs, pose for photographs and reminisce about the American Old West with anyone who would listen.

In more recent years, the University of Wyoming and New Mexico State University began using variations of OSU's artwork as logos for their schools.

However, it was not until 1958 that "Pistol Pete" was adopted as the school's mascot. The familiar caricature of "Pistol Pete" was officially sanctioned in 1984 by Oklahoma State University as a licensed symbol.

Each year, an average of 15 Oklahoma State students audition to portray Pistol Pete. A panel of former "Petes" conduct the tryouts and select two replacements based largely on an interview. Candidates are also asked to exhibit themselves as they would during in-game scenarios.

The two students chosen share around 650 appearances per year, which includes all OSU Cowboy and Cowgirl athletic events, though Pistol Pete has also assumed a significant role as an ambassador and symbol for Oklahoma State University at large. As such, Pistol Pete is often asked to make appearances in parades, community festivals, corporate functions, weddings and birthday parties.

President Thep Phongparnich of Thailand's Maejo University received Oklahoma State's Distinguished International Alumni Award on November 12, 2005, following which his university also adopted Pistol Pete as a mascot.

== See also ==
- Oklahoma State Cowboys and Cowgirls
- Frank Eaton
