= Perkins, Oklahoma =

- City
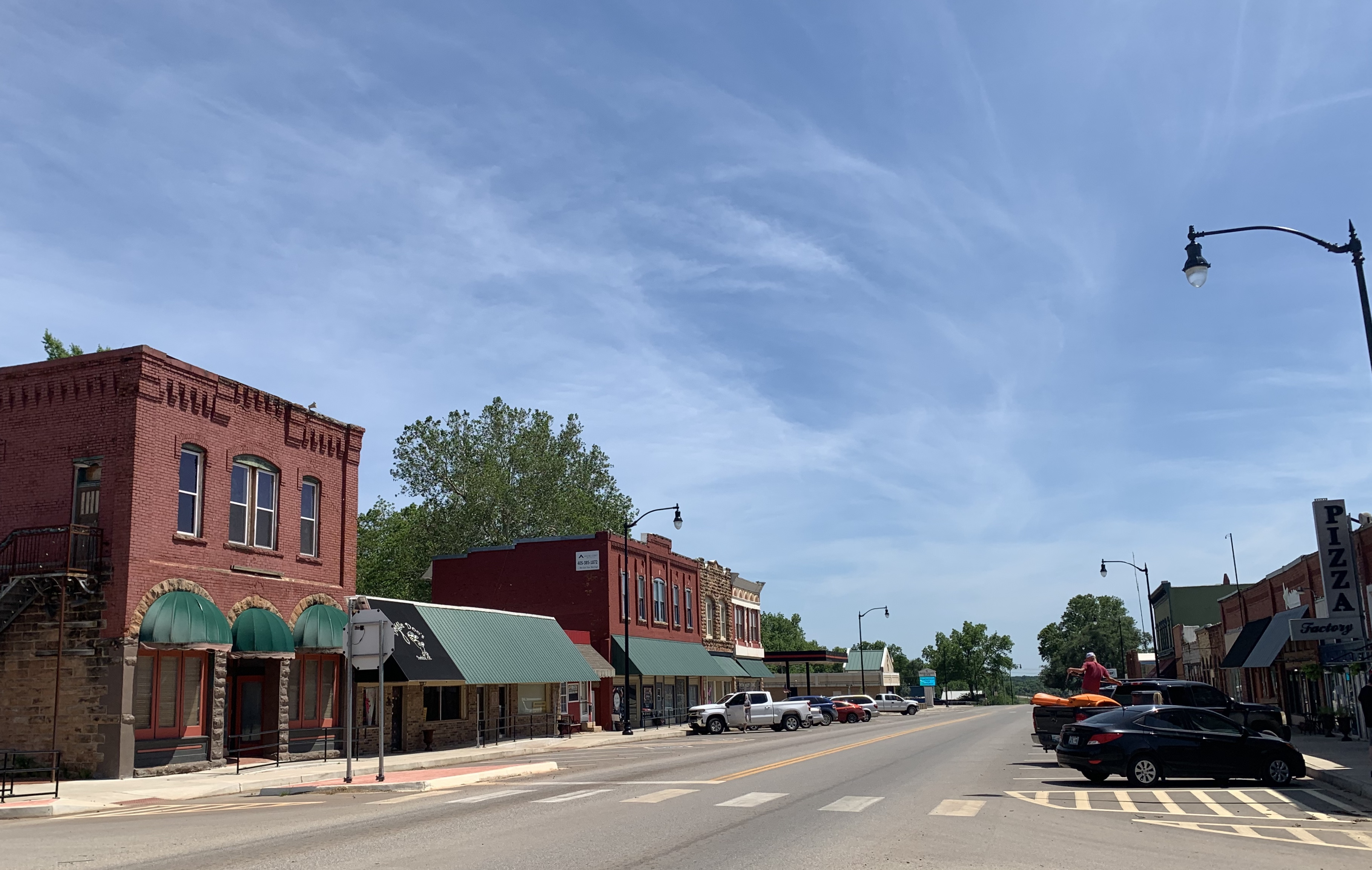

- Location within Payne County and Oklahoma
- Coordinates: 35°58′43″N 97°01′48″W
- Country: United States
- State: Oklahoma
- County: Payne

Government
  - Mayor: Carla S. Cummings

Area
  - Total: 2.92 sq mi (7.57 km^{2})
  - Land: 2.92 sq mi (7.56 km^{2})
  - Water: 0.0039 sq mi (0.01 km^{2})
- Elevation: 902 ft (275 m)

Population (2020)
  - Total: 3,205
  - Density: 1,097.8/sq mi (423.88/km^{2})
- Time zone: UTC-6 (Central (CST))
  - Summer (DST): UTC-5 (CDT)
- ZIP code: 74059
- Area codes: 405/572
- FIPS code: 40-58150
- GNIS feature ID: 2411402
- Website: cityofperkins.net

Perkins (Iowa-Oto: Pékiⁿ Chína^i) is a city in southern Payne County, Oklahoma, United States. As of the 2020 census, Perkins had a population of 3,205. The name is derived from Walden Perkins, a congressman who helped establish the local post office. The Iowa Tribe of Oklahoma is headquartered here.

== History ==
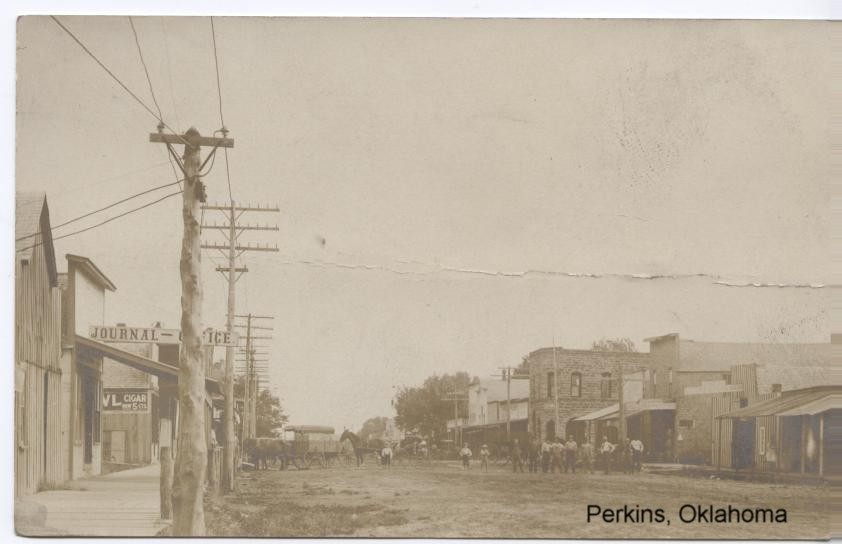
Historical Perkins

Perkins was founded during the Land Run in April 1889. Joseph Wert staked a claim for 160 acres and offered up 40 acres of his land to be established as a township. The town went through three names in its first year- Cimarron, Italy, and then Perkins. The last name was for Bishop Walden Perkins, a congressman from Kansas who pulled strings to establish the post office for the new township. The town of Perkins incorporated on August 25, 1891.

Though Perkins was settled in 1889, it celebrates Old Settlers Day around Sept 22. This is the anniversary of the Land Run of 1891. Being on the north side of the Cimarron River, it was one of the starting points for the Run of 1891.

The first wagon bridge across the Cimarron River in Oklahoma Territory was built during the summer of 1891. On September 22, 1891, the Sac and Fox and Iowa reservations officially opened. By January 1900, the Eastern Oklahoma Railway began service, establishing the town as an agricultural trade center.

== Geography ==
Perkins is on the north bank of the Cimarron River. Perkins is located on U.S. Route 177, south of its junction with State Highway 33.

According to the United States Census Bureau, the town has a total area of 2.2 square miles (5.7 km^{2}), all land.

== Demographics ==
Historical population
Census	Pop.	Note	%±
1900	719		—
1910	603		−16.1%
1920	608		0.8%
1930	606		−0.3%
1940	728		20.1%
1950	706		−3.0%
1960	769		8.9%
1970	1,029		33.8%
1980	1,762		71.2%
1990	1,925		9.3%
2000	2,272		18.0%
2010	2,831		24.6%
2020	3,205		13.2%
U.S. Decennial Census

=== 2020 census ===
As of the 2020 census, Perkins had a population of 3,205, a median age of 34.0 years, with 28.3% of residents under the age of 18 and 16.3% of residents 65 years of age or older. For every 100 females there were 87.1 males, and for every 100 females age 18 and over there were 84.1 males age 18 and over.

0% of residents lived in urban areas, while 100.0% lived in rural areas.

There were 1,312 households in Perkins, of which 38.0% had children under the age of 18 living in them. Of all households, 44.7% were married-couple households, 14.7% were households with a male householder and no spouse or partner present, and 34.1% were households with a female householder and no spouse or partner present. About 30.3% of all households were made up of individuals and 15.6% had someone living alone who was 65 years of age or older.

There were 1,422 housing units, of which 7.7% were vacant. Among occupied housing units, 60.8% were owner-occupied and 39.2% were renter-occupied. The homeowner vacancy rate was 1.0% and the rental vacancy rate was 10.2%.

Racial composition as of the 2020 census
Race	Percent
White	77.9%
Black or African American	2.0%
American Indian and Alaska Native	7.1%
Asian	0.2%
Native Hawaiian and Other Pacific Islander	0.1%
Some other race	1.8%
Two or more races	10.8%
Hispanic or Latino (of any race)	4.7%

=== 2000 census ===
As of the census of 2000, there were 2,272 people, 913 households, and 644 families residing in the town. The population density was 1,018.4 inhabitants per square mile (393.2/km^{2}). There were 988 housing units at an average density of 442.8 per square mile (171.0/km^{2}). The racial makeup of the town was 85.48% White, 2.46% African American, 6.47% Native American, 0.31% Asian, 0.44% from other races, and 4.84% from two or more races. Hispanic or Latino of any race were 1.10% of the population.

There were 913 households, out of which 32.9% had children under the age of 18 living with them, 54.2% were married couples living together, 13.6% had a female householder with no husband present, and 29.4% were non-families. 27.1% of all households were made up of individuals, and 10.2% had someone living alone who was 65 years of age or older. The average household size was 2.49 and the average family size was 3.02.

In the town the population was spread out, with 27.2% under the age of 18, 9.2% from 18 to 24, 28.8% from 25 to 44, 20.8% from 45 to 64, and 14.0% who were 65 years of age or older. The median age was 35 years. For every 100 females, there were 91.6 males. For every 100 females age 18 and over, there were 81.5 males.

The median income for a household in the town was $30,030, and the median income for a family was $38,580. Males had a median income of $26,553 versus $20,761 for females. The per capita income for the town was $14,955. About 7.6% of families and 11.2% of the population were below the poverty line, including 12.8% of those under age 18 and 12.5% of those age 65 or over.

== Government ==
Perkins has a commission-manager form of government.

== Notable people ==
- Jesse Barnes was a pitcher for the World Series Champion New York Giants.
- Frank "Pistol Pete" Eaton is buried in Perkins. The house he lived in is located in the Park located on 177 north of Perkins.
- Jeremy Hefner is a former professional baseball pitcher and pitching coach for the New York Mets.
- Linda Livingstone is the 15th president of Baylor University.
- Michael Atkins is a former Professional Golfer that attended Oklahoma State and then proceeding onto the PGA Tour and winning 7 total tournaments.

== Media ==
Perkins, Oklahoma, has been featured in an Independent Lens series documenting bullying.
