= Stillwater Central Railroad =

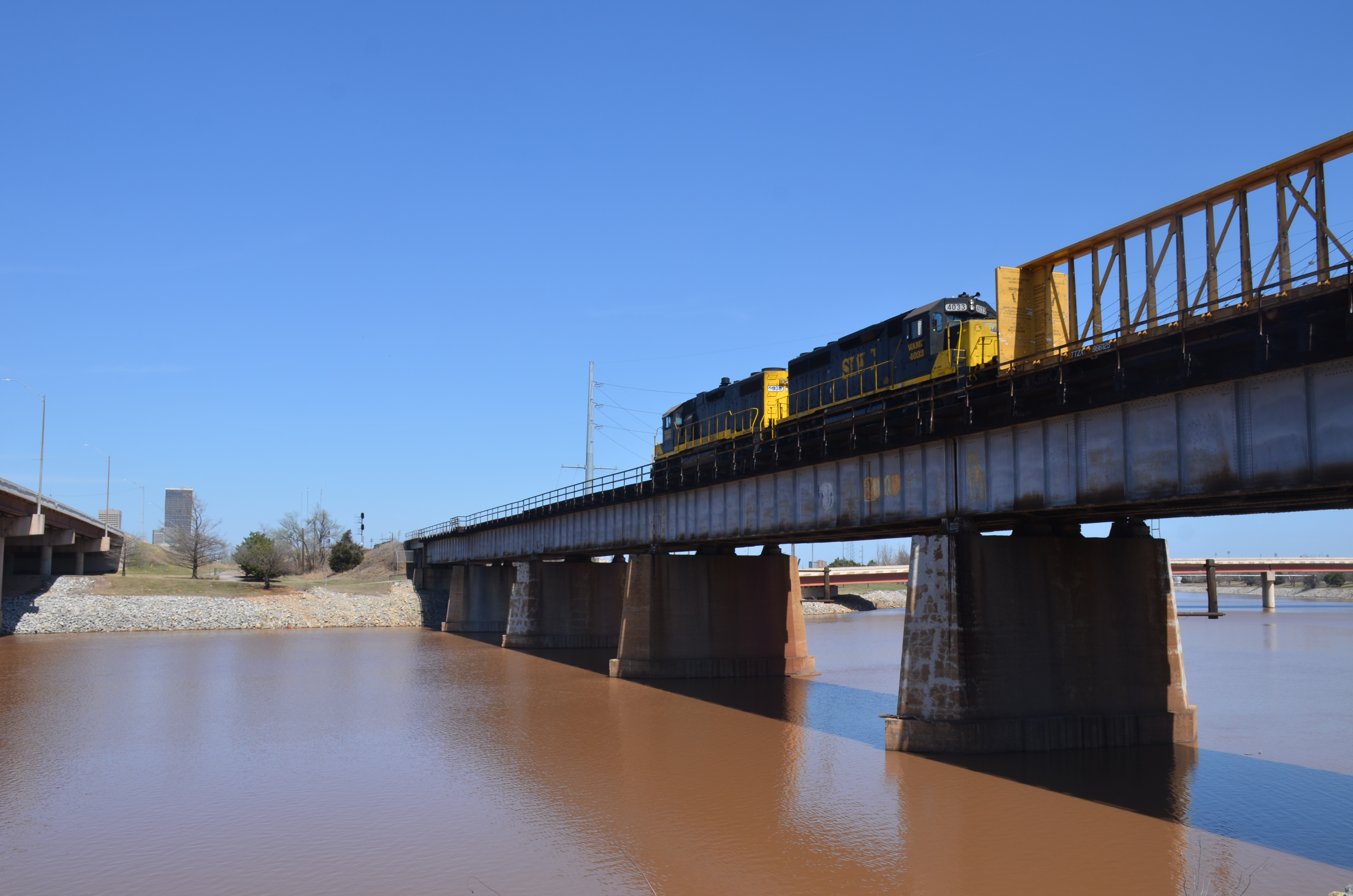
Stillwater Central Railroad train crossing the Oklahoma River approaching Oklahoma City

Stillwater Central Railroad (reporting mark SLWC) is a shortline railroad operating in Oklahoma.

A subsidiary of Watco, the SLWC operates over 275 miles (443 km) of track in the state from Sapulpa through Oklahoma City through Lawton to Snyder and has trackage rights over BNSF from Sapulpa to Tulsa, and from Snyder to Long. SLWC operates a branch from Stillwater to a connection with BNSF at Pawnee. Its primary business is handling mined, mineral, and industrial products.

== History ==
In July 1998, SLWC leased 125 miles (201 km) of rail line from the State of Oklahoma. This included both the line between Sapulpa (near Tulsa) and Del City (near Oklahoma City), known as the Sooner Sub, as well as a branch line from Stillwater to Pawnee (geographically separated from the other line leased).

In January 2002, SLWC acquired from the BNSF, and began operating, 120 miles (190 km) of rail line from Wheatland (south of Oklahoma City) to Long. In January 2005, SLWC leased from BNSF a line from Wheatland to Oklahoma City.

In January 2010, in conjunction with BNSF, the SLWC launched unit crude oil train service between the Bakken oil fields and a terminal in Oklahoma.

In July 2014 SLWC agreed to purchase the Sooner Sub line from the State of Oklahoma, subject to approval by the Surface Transportation Board; the STB approved the transaction on July 29, 2014. The purchase contract reportedly included a requirement to start a six-month daily passenger service trial run over the line before August 2019, with a financial penalty for not meeting the deadline set at $2.8 million. The agreement also called for the state to retain the right to acquire a passenger rail easement should the company decide not to operate such a service after 10 years. Finally, the agreement required the line to be accessible to other rail companies, and for the SLWC to upgrade the track from FRA Class II to Class III, to enable trains to safely travel at faster speeds. Class III permits freight traffic up to 40 mph and passenger traffic up to 60 mph. In June 2018, SLWC, being only a freight operator, issued a request for proposal to begin the process of securing a private rail carrier to provide the passenger service, locally known as the Eastern Flyer, for an initial period of 10 years, along the route between Sapulpa and Del City, but with the expectation of working with city officials to expand it to the downtowns of Tulsa and Oklahoma City. Government officials were not optimistic that the original August 2019 deadline would be met. On August 5, 2019, the Stillwater Central opted to default under the agreement and pay the contractual $2.8 million penalty for not establishing the service. However, the company had accomplished the upgrading of the rail line as agreed.

== Roster ==
Locomotive	Builder	Model	Serial no.	Frame no.	Built	Notes
2186	EMD	GP7u	17018	5218-A4	March 1953	
WAMX 4278	EMD	SD40M-2	34607	7148-38	February 1969	
7022	EMD	GP7u	17006	5170-7	September 1952	
