= National Collegiate Equestrian Association =

Governing body for American college women's equestrian sports

- Headquarters: Waco, Texas
- Website: collegiateequestrian.com
- Formerly called: Varsity Equestrian

The National Collegiate Equestrian Association (NCEA), formerly known as Varsity Equestrian, was created as the governing body for NCAA Equestrian teams. The NCEA is headquartered in Waco, Texas. Currently the NCEA has 24 official member colleges and universities that sponsor women's equestrian teams that participate in intercollegiate competition as a varsity sport. Some schools are further organized into conferences (ECAC, Big 12, SEC) while others are not. Most schools sponsor women's teams while two sponsor men's.

They began hosting a national championship in 2002. As membership has grown, they have begun to sponsor regional championships as well. They began hosting a Big 12 regional championship in 2009, a Southeastern Conference (SEC) regional championship in 2013, and a United Equestrian Conference (UEC) regional championship in 2015. In 2012 they began the NCEA Coach of the Year Award and in 2013 they began the team given NCEA Sportsmanship Award. In 2011 they began naming an NCEA All-American First Team for each section of competition, composed of the top four riders as selected by the NCEA selection committee. In that same year they also began to name All-American Honorable Mentions based on a set criteria where there is no limit as to how many can earn the award. In 2013 they began naming an NCEA All-American Second Team composed of the next top four riders as selected by the NCEA selection committee. In the 2013–14 season they began naming an NCEA All-Time Rider of the Month Award to one athlete from each section of competition during the regular season.

In 1998 the National Collegiate Athletic Association (NCAA) and Committee on Women's Athletics (CWA) identified Equestrian as an emerging sport for women in NCAA Divisions I and II. In September 2019, the CWA supported a proposal to add equestrian to the Emerging Sports for Women program in Division III. The proposal was submitted to Division III delegates at the NCAA Convention in January 2020, but was defeated 174–195.

== Competition format ==
Schools organize season schedules that allow for head-to-head competitions resulting in ranking and seeding for conference and national titles. They compete during the fall semester from September to November and during the Spring semester from January to March. From March on there are post-season competitions. Home team schools can delegate the number of junior varsity riders that may accompany the varsity team to compete.

Home teams provide the horses and appropriate equipment for them and the competition. Five horses are selected for each of the four events and coaches designate five of their riders to compete in each event for the English and Western components of the competition. A rider from each team is randomly paired and assigned to a horse for each event to compete in a "head-to head" match. Competitors are allowed to watch sanctioned warm-ups where horses are schooled for each of the four events. Riders are then given four minutes to practice on their assigned horse for each event. Riders competing in Equitation over Fences are allowed to take four practice fences within the four minutes of warm-ups.

Each rider earns a score and the highest score on that horse wins the head-to-head match and scores a point for that team. Neither team receives the point if the two riders are given a tie score. If there is a tie in the overall competition, raw scores given by the judge are added up and used to determine the winner. In some cases, the lowest score from each team may be dropped.

Equitation on the Flat (English Hunt Seat)

Riders selected to compete in Equitation on the Flat demonstrate a predetermined test that is performed in a dressage arena measuring 20 meters by 40 meters. The riders must demonstrate a precise, well executed and accurate test while staying in correct position and maintaining a harmonious balance with the horse they've drawn to compete upon. Depending on the test selected by the home team, the judge can sit by letters B, C, or E. The home team may also choose if the horse and rider should enter the arena at letter A or along both of the long sides of the arena.

Testing is judged on a scale from 0 to 10, with 0 meaning "not performed" and 10 marking "excellent". Riders will perform nine required movement, all scored using the defined scale based on accuracy and smoothness. The tenth score is judged using the same scale but is regarded to the riders overall position and correctness. The highest score a rider can receive is 100.

Equitation over Fences (English Hunt Seat)

Riders selected to compete in Equitation over Fences will show over a course of eight to ten fences set around 3' to 3'6" in which the rider must successfully navigate the correct course while maintaining proper position. The rider should also be able to make the course look smooth by having consistent pace, consistent and correct distances to the jumps, and consistent striding between fences. The round is scored using a defined scale out of 100.

Horsemanship (Western)

In horsemanship, the horse and rider perform a pattern in which different maneuvers and the horse's different gaits are exhibited. The base score for a pattern is 70, and the judge will score each of the 7–9 maneuvers anywhere from −1.5 to +1.5. The positive score indicates that a movement is above average in execution and the negative score deducts points for poor execution. Penalties are given if a horse kicks out, lopes on the wrong lead, or otherwise detracts from the uniformity of the performance. It is possible for a rider to receive a score of zero if mistakes such as going off-pattern (adding or subtracting elements from the original pattern) are made.

Reining (Western)

Unlike horsemanship patterns, reining patterns include spins and sliding stops performed by the horse and rider. In reining, a score starts 70 and can be higher or lower depending on the quality of the ride. Riders perform movements that include: fast circles, slow circles, spins and sliding stops. Going off-pattern results in a score of zero. Over- or under-spinning by more than a quarter of a turn is also given a score of zero.

== Varsity equestrian teams ==
Division I
- Auburn
- Baylor
- College of Charleston (Does not have competing NCEA team)
- Cornell (Does not have competing NCEA team)
- Dartmouth (Hunt seat)
- Delaware State
- Fresno State
- Georgia
- Long Island University (Does not have competing NCEA team)
- Oklahoma State
- Sacred Heart (Hunt seat)
- South Carolina
- South Dakota State
- SMU
- Stonehill (Does not have competing NCEA team)
- TCU
- Texas A&M
- Tennessee-Martin
- UC Davis (Will demote sport to club status following 2026 season)
Division II:
- Seton Hill (Does not have competing NCEA team)
- Minnesota-Crookston
- West Texas A&M
Division III:
- Bridgewater (Hunt seat only)
- Lynchburg (Hunt seat only)
- SUNY New Paltz (Hunt seat only)
- Sweet Briar (Hunt seat only)
- Sewanee (Hunt seat only)
- Wilson College

=== Past members ===
==== Division I ====
- Kansas State University | Final season: 2015–16
- New Mexico State University | Final season: 2016–17

==== Division II ====
- Pace University

=== Conferences ===
The conferences listed below host Conference Championship competitions for the Division I schools listed below. Big 12, ECAC and SEC are the only conferences involved with the NCEA Division I. Conference Championships take place between the end of the regular equestrian season and National Championships.

==== Big 12 Conference ====
- Baylor
- Fresno State
- Oklahoma State
- Texas Christian University

==== Eastern College Athletic Conference (ECAC) ====
- Delaware State
- Minnesota Crookston
- South Dakota State
- UC Davis
- UT Martin

==== Southeastern Conference (SEC) ====
- Auburn
- Georgia
- South Carolina
- Texas A&M

== Equestrian as an NCAA Emerging Sport ==
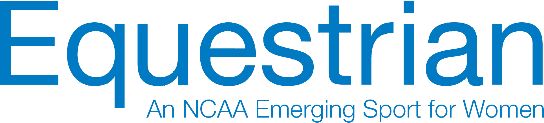
Logo of ESW Equestrian

Equestrian has been on the list of Emerging Sports for Women by the NCAA since 2002. The Committee on Women's Athletics (CWA) oversees sports with the designation of being an Emerging Sport.

The NCAA states, "Sports in the emerging sports program are expected to grow to 40 varsity teams within 10 years – the minimum level of sponsorship needed to be considered for the ultimate goal of becoming a full-fledged NCAA championship sport." Although the 10-year mark has been passed for equestrian, the sport remained on the list because of continued growth and support. However, it has faced several threats of removal from the list. In January 2016, some 200 college administrators voted for equestrian to continue in Division II at the NCAA Convention. Dr. Leah Holland Fiorentino has been integral in the fight for equestrian as a collegiate sport, as has Tom O'Mara.

=== Progress ===
In August 2017, it was announced that Sweet Briar would become the first Division III member of the NCEA.

It was announced in April 2018 by UC Davis that women's equestrian would become a varsity sport, and that it would be joining the NCEA.

At the 2018 NCEA Championships, the NCAA's Director of Inclusion, Amy Wilson, was in attendance. This was the first time an NCAA official attended the championships since the sport was added to the Emerging Sports list. The U.S. Equestrian Federation's CEO, Bill Moroney, was also on-hand.

In August 2019 it was announced that the University of Lynchburg and the State University of New York at New Paltz would be joining as Division III members in the 2019–2020 season.

== National Collegiate Athletic Association (NCAA) rules and eligibility ==
As a prospective athlete, students wishing to attend a Division I or II institution must be eligible before competing within collegiate athletics. One form in specific that should be downloaded by the prospective athlete is called the "Guide for the College Bound Student-Athlete". There students will be able to look over the requirements more in depth. Most importantly, the student must still be an amateur to compete.

Coaches may send out written contacts as of September 1 of the athlete's junior year but may not return phone calls prior to July 1 of the athlete's senior year. If an athlete is on an official visit they must be seniors, however, trips made at the athlete's personal expense may take place before their senior years. Each type of visit may not be during a dead period in schooling at the university.

== NCEA National Championship results ==
List of NCEA National Championship results
Year	Overall	Hunter seat	Western
2002	Texas A&M	Georgia	West Texas A&M
2003	Georgia	Georgia	Oklahoma State
2004	Georgia	Georgia	Oklahoma State
2005	South Carolina	South Carolina	Texas A&M
2006	Auburn	South Carolina	Oklahoma State
2007	South Carolina	South Carolina	Texas A&M
2008	Georgia	Auburn	TCU
2009	Georgia	Georgia	Texas A&M
2010	Georgia	Georgia	Texas A&M
2011	Auburn	Auburn	Texas A&M
2012	Texas A&M	Baylor	Texas A&M
2013	Auburn	Auburn	Oklahoma State
2014*	Georgia		
2015*	South Carolina		
2016*	Auburn		
2017*	Texas A&M		
2018	Auburn	Auburn	Auburn
2019	Auburn	Auburn	Georgia
2020	cancelled (pandemic)		

*From 2014 to 2017 only an overall national champion was crowned

List of NCEA National Championship results
Year	Dual Discipline	Single Discipline Jumping Seat
2021	Georgia	Sweet Briar
2022	Oklahoma State	Lynchburg
2023	SMU	Lynchburg
2024	SMU	Lynchburg
2025	Georgia	Dartmouth
2026	South Carolina	Lynchburg
