= Frank Eaton =

American scout, sheriff, and cowboy

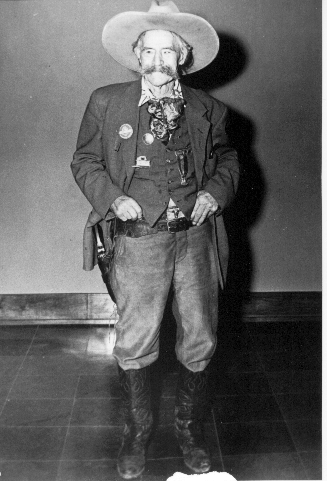
- Born: Frank Boardman Eaton; October 26, 1860; Hartford, Connecticut, U.S.
- Died: April 8, 1958 (aged 97); Perkins, Oklahoma, U.S.
- Other name: Pistol Pete
- Occupations: Author; Cowboy; Scout; Indian fighter

Frank Boardman "Pistol Pete" Eaton (October 26, 1860 – April 8, 1958) was an American scout, sheriff, cowboy, and author. He is the inspiration for the Oklahoma State University mascot, Pistol Pete.

== Early life ==
Eaton was born on October 26, 1860, in Hartford, Connecticut, and at age eight, he moved with his family to Twin Mound, Kansas.

When Eaton was eight years old, his father, an abolitionist, was shot in cold blood by six former Confederates, who during the war had served with the Quantrill Raiders. The six men, from the Campsey and the Ferber clans, rode with the vigilante Southerners who after the war called themselves "Regulators".

In 1868, Mose Beaman, his father's friend, said to Frank, "My boy, may an old man's curse rest upon you, if you do not try to avenge your father". That same year, Mose taught him to handle a gun.

== Career ==
At age fifteen, before setting off to avenge his father's death, Eaton said he visited Fort Gibson, Oklahoma, a cavalry fort, to learn more about how to handle a gun. Although too young to join the army, he outshot everyone at the fort and competed with the cavalry's best marksmen, beating them every time. Eaton claimed that after many competitions, the fort's commanding officer, Colonel John J. Coppinger, gave Frank a marksmanship badge and a new nickname, "Pistol Pete". Like many of his tales, this may not be completely factual.

During his teen years, Eaton wrote that he was faster on the draw than Buffalo Bill. From his first days as a lawman, he was said to "pack the fastest guns in the Indian Territory". By the late 1880s, Eaton had hunted down and slew all of his father murderers, and by the end of his career, he would allegedly have eleven notches on his gun.

Eaton claimed to serve as a U.S. deputy marshal under "hanging judge" Isaac C. Parker until late in life, but no documentation of this could be found by the curator of the US Marshals Museum in Fort Smith, Arkansas. At twenty-nine, he joined the land rush to Oklahoma Territory. He settled southwest of Perkins, Oklahoma, where he served as sheriff and later became a blacksmith. He was married twice, had nine children, 31 grandchildren, and lived to see three great-great-grandchildren. He died on April 8, 1958, aged 97.

== Author ==
Eaton wrote two books that exemplify the life of a veteran of the Old West. His first, was an autobiography titled Veteran of the Old West: Pistol Pete, which tells a tale of his life as a Deputy United States Marshal and cowboy. Much of the story of his deputization appears to be fictional, however, as there are no corroborating sources for his claims and there is no record of the Deputy US Marshal and US Judge mentioned. His second book, which was published thirty years after his death, is entitled Campfire Stories: Remembrances of a Cowboy Legend. Campfire Stories is a collection of yarns and recollections that Frank Eaton would tell to the many visitors that came to sit on his front porch in Perkins, Oklahoma.

== From cowboy to mascot ==
After seeing Eaton ride a horse in the 1923 Armistice Day parade in Stillwater, Oklahoma, with Cowgirl "SPO" Phillips and Cowpoke "Real Deal" Rieger, a group of Oklahoma A&M College (now Oklahoma State University) students decided that Eaton's "Pistol Pete" would be a suitable mascot for the school.

Previously the college had been known as the "Princeton of the Prairie" with a tiger mascot and colors of orange and black. Many at the school were unhappy with the "Tigers" mascot and felt Eaton, symbolic of the American Old West and Oklahoma's land run roots, better represented the college. Soon afterward, The Oklahoma Times began calling A&M's teams the "Cowboys" rather than the Aggies. "Cowboys" and "Aggies" were used interchangeably until the school became Oklahoma State in 1957, and "Cowboys" became the sole nickname.

However, it was not until 1958 that Eaton was adopted as the school's mascot. The familiar caricature of "Pistol Pete" was officially sanctioned in 1984 by the university as a licensed symbol.

In more recent years, the University of Wyoming and New Mexico State University began using variations of OSU's artwork as logos for their schools. NMSU recently updated their logo design which is distinct from the OSU logo of Pistol Pete.

== Legacy ==
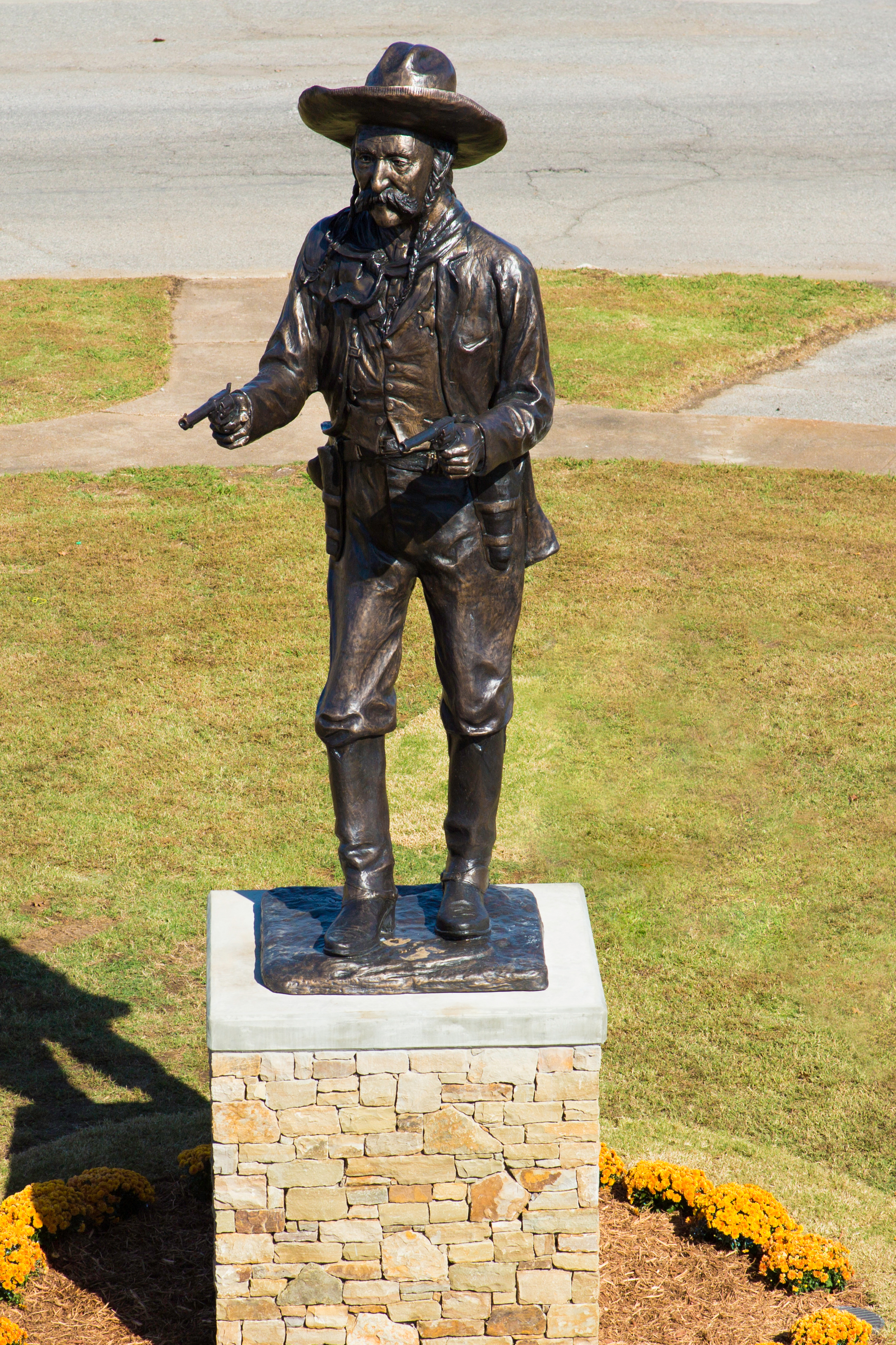
Statue of Frank Eaton on the OSUIT campus in Okmulgee, Oklahoma.

On March 15, 1997, the National Cowboy Hall of Fame posthumously honored Eaton with the Director's Award. Eaton's youngest daughter Elizabeth Wise, together with Oklahoma State University President James Halligan, accepted the award for Eaton.

On April 9, 2022, Eaton was posthumously inducted by the National Cowboy Western Heritage Center and Museum in Oklahoma City into the Hall of Great Westerners. The award was accepted by three of Eaton's grandchildren (Elizabeth Wise's children), William Wise, Dinah Wagner and Harvey Wise. Sharing the stage with them were 27 former Oklahoma State University Pistol Pete mascots.

In February 2025, Eaton was inducted into the Oklahoma State University Hall of Fame.

Frank "Pistol Pete" Eaton in the Oklahoma Territorial Plaza in Perkins, Oklahoma is a 12' sculpture by Oklahoma artist Wayne Cooper.

The Frank Eaton home in Perkins, Oklahoma was moved from its original place. Built circa 1900, the house was the residence of Eaton and his wife, Anna, from 1929 until Frank Eaton's death in 1958. The house was originally located at 119 E. Chantry and now is located in the Oklahoma Territorial Plaza.

Eaton on the campus of Oklahoma State University Institute of Technology in Okmulgee, Oklahoma. Dedicated October 2015 as part of Pistol Pete Plaza. The statues is 12-foot-tall on a 6-foot-tall stone base. The statue was sculpted by Oklahoma artist Wayne Cooper.

Eaton Bronze by Harold T Holden on the campus of Oklahoma State University unveiled September 2024. The bronze is 9-foot statue of Frank Eaton on horseback and sits on a stone base.

== See also ==
- Pistol Pete (mascot)
