= Sapulpa, Oklahoma =

City in Oklahoma, US

Sapulpa Svpvlpv (Creek)
- City
- Downtown Sapulpa along the old Route 66, August 2026
- Motto: "Oklahoma's Most Connected City"
- Location within Creek County and Oklahoma

- Location in the United States
- Coordinates: 36°0′43″N 96°05′49″W
- Country: United States
- State: Oklahoma
- Counties: Creek, Tulsa

Area
  - Total: 24.27 sq mi (62.87 km^{2})
  - Land: 23.50 sq mi (60.86 km^{2})
  - Water: 0.78 sq mi (2.01 km^{2})
- Elevation: 719 ft (219 m)

Population (2020)
  - Total: 21,929
  - Density: 933.2/sq mi (360.31/km^{2})
- Demonym: Sapulpan
- Time zone: UTC-6 (Central (CST))
  - Summer (DST): UTC-5 (CDT)
- ZIP codes: 74066-74067
- Area codes: 539/918
- FIPS code: 40-65400
- GNIS feature ID: 2411831
- Website: www.sapulpaok.gov

Sapulpa (Creek: Svpvlpv) is a city in and the county seat of Creek County, extending partly into Tulsa County, in the U.S. state of Oklahoma. Its population was 21,929 at the time of the 2020 census, up from 20,544 at the 2010 census.

== History ==
Downtown Sapulpa showing 1910 Westfall Bldg on corner, in August of 2026

=== Early history ===
The town was named after the area's first permanent settler, a full-blood Lower Creek Indian named James Sapulpa, from the Kasihta or Cusseta band, from Osocheetown in Alabama. About 1850, he established a trading post near the meeting of Polecat and Rock Creeks (about 1 mile or 1.6 km) southeast of downtown Sapulpa).

When the Atlantic and Pacific Railroad (which became the Frisco) built a spur to this area in 1886 known as Sapulpa Station. The Sapulpa post office was chartered July 1, 1889, and the town was incorporated on March 31, 1898.

=== Controversy over Creek County seat location ===
After Oklahoma became a state, each county held an election to determine the location of the county seat. Sapulpa competed with Bristow to be the county seat of Creek County. After five years of contested elections and court suits, the issue was settled by the Oklahoma Supreme Court on August 1, 1913. Sapulpa was ruled the winner. The county courthouse was completed in 1914, replacing an earlier structure built in 1902.

=== Economic development ===
When Sapulpa was founded, the main crop of the area was walnuts. In 1898, the Sapulpa Pressed Brick Co. was established, followed in a few years by the Sapulpa Brick Co. This began the clay-products industry. Sapulpa is the former home of Frankoma Pottery, which is now located south of Glenpool; however, the town retains a Frankoma Road in tribute.

The founding of Premium Glass Company in 1912 marked Sapulpa's entry to glass manufacturing. Premium Glass was acquired by Liberty Glass Company in 1918. The plant, after many changes to the facilities and in ownership, as of 2019 makes beer bottles under the Ardagh Group.

Other glass factories in the city included the Bartlett-Collins Glass Company, originally opened in 1914, which was closed by subsequent owner Anchor Hocking in 2008. The Schram Glass Company, which opened a jar and jar cap plant in 1914, was closed by the Ball Brothers in 1931. The Sunflower Glass Plant, which produced window glass, began operations in 1913, and after being leased to Victory Window Glass Co. in 1924, ceased operations in 1932.

According to the Encyclopedia of Oklahoma History, Sapulpa was known as "the Crystal City of the Southwest".

=== Rail transportation ===
In 1886, the Atlantic and Pacific Railroad, which already had a line stretching from Missouri to Tulsa and Red Fork, extended its tracks into Sapulpa. In 1898, the St. Louis and Oklahoma City Railroad built 103.2 miles of track from Sapulpa to Oklahoma City. Both of these lines subsequently came under the control of the St. Louis-San Francisco Railway (Frisco). The Frisco built a railyard in Sapulpa and by 1900 designated Sapulpa as an overhaul base for its rolling stock. Also in 1900, construction of the line from Sapulpa to Denison, Texas, was started and rushed to completion by March 1901. With changes in ownership over the years, the portion of the old Frisco line between Sapulpa and Del City, Oklahoma, near Oklahoma City, known as the Sooner Sub, ended up being owned by the State of Oklahoma.

In 1998, the Sooner Sub was leased to Stillwater Central Railroad and in 2014 was sold to them. The sale contract required initiating a six-month trial of daily passenger service before August 2019—known as the Eastern Flyer—with a financial penalty of $2.8 million for failure to meet the deadline.

On August 5, 2019, with no passenger service in place, the Stillwater Central defaulted on the contract and paid the penalty.

Sapulpa in its early days was on the route of the Sapulpa and Interurban Railway (S&I) streetcar/interurban line connecting to Tulsa in one direction, and Kiefer, Glenpool, and Mounds in the other. S&I subsequently underwent a series of mergers and name changes, with only the Tulsa-to-Sapulpa portion continuing as the Tulsa-Sapulpa Union Railway.

Heart of Route 66 Auto Museum during construction of a large addition, 8-2026

=== Route 66 ===
Sapulpa is on old U.S. Route 66, now SH-66 and Historic Route 66 (a.k.a. the West Ozark Trail) through town. Route 66 sites include the Heart of Route 66 Auto Museum, which opened in August 2016 in an armory built in 1948, and the Tee Pee Drive-In, which opened the next year. It features the world's tallest replica antique visible gas pump, at 66 feet, or 74 feet including the circular sign on top. Still standing is the Rock Creek Bridge, the historic Bridge No. 18 at Rock Creek, a 1921 metal bridge that became a link in the original Route 66 in 1926, and is now the centerpiece of a Route 66 park.

== Geography ==
Sapulpa is located in the northeast corner of Creek County. A small portion of the city that extends north into Tulsa County was annexed into Sapulpa in 2004. Downtown Tulsa is 14 miles (23 km) to the northeast via Interstate 44 (I-44). The Creek Turnpike (State Highway 364) branches east from I-44 in northeastern Sapulpa and provides a southern and eastern bypass of Tulsa.

In January 2018, the Sapulpa City Council voted to approve the annexation of about 300 acres of land in West Tulsa. The land is bordered to the north by 51st Street, to the south by Southwest Blvd, and to the west by 65th West Avenue. Originally, this annexation included the future site of the interchange of the Gilcrease Expressway and I-44, but the city has now planned to cede this area back to the city of Tulsa.

According to the United States Census Bureau, the city of Sapulpa has a total area of 25.1 square miles (65.1 km^{2}), of which 0.81 square miles (2.1 km^{2}), or 3.21%, are covered by water.

== Demographics ==
Historical population
Census	Pop.	Note	%±
1900	891		—
1910	8,283		829.6%
1920	11,634		40.5%
1930	10,533		−9.5%
1940	12,249		16.3%
1950	13,031		6.4%
1960	14,282		9.6%
1970	15,159		6.1%
1980	15,853		4.6%
1990	18,074		14.0%
2000	19,166		6.0%
2010	20,544		7.2%
2020	21,929		6.7%

=== 2020 census ===
As of the 2020 census, Sapulpa had a population of 21,929. The median age was 38.7 years; 23.7% of residents were under 18 and 18.8% were 65 age or older. For every 100 females, there were 92.5 males, and for every 100 females 18 and over, there were 89.8 males 18 and over.

About 93.3% of residents lived in urban areas, while 6.7% lived in rural areas.

Of the 8,668 households in Sapulpa, 31.5% had children under 18 living in them, 45.3% were married-couple households, 17.8% were households with a male householder and no spouse or partner present, and 29.7% were households with a female householder and no spouse or partner present. About 28.5% of all households were made up of individuals, and 13.9% had someone living alone who was 65 or older.

The city had 9,609 housing units, of which 9.8% were vacant. Among occupied housing units, 62.5% were owner-occupied and 37.5% were renter-occupied. The homeowner vacancy rate was 1.9% and the rental vacancy rate was 9.8%.

Racial composition as of the 2020 census
Race	Percent
White	69.7%
Black or African American	2.8%
American Indian and Alaska Native	10.7%
Asian	0.6%
Native Hawaiian and other Pacific Islander	0.2%
Some other race	2.2%
Two or more races	13.9%
Hispanic or Latino (of any race)	6.1%

=== 2010 census ===
As of the 2010 census, 20,544 people, 8,015 households, and 5,497 families were residing in the city. The population density was 844.3 people per square mile. The 8,903 housing units had an average density of 435.4 per square mile (168.1/km^{2}). The racial makeup of the city was 77.5% White, 3.0% African American, 10.9% Native American, 0.6% Asian, 0.2% Pacific Islander, 1.5% from other races, and 6.3% from two or more races. Hispanics or Latinos of any race were 4.1% of the population.

Of the 7,430 households, 32.5% had children under 18 living with them, 54.8% were married couples living together, 12.9% had a female householder with no husband present, and 27.9% were not families. About 24.2% of all households were made up of individuals, and 10.5% had someone living alone who was 65 or older. The average household size was 2.54, and the average family size was 3.00.

In the city, the age distribution was 26.1% under 18, 7.9% from 18 to 24, 27.5% from 25 to 44, 23.7% from 45 to 64, and 14.8% who were 65 or older. The median age was 37 years. For every 100 females, there were 91.2 males. For every 100 females 18 and over, there were 86.9 males.

The median income in the city for a household was $40,372 and for a family was $52,639. Males had a median income of $30,524 versus $21,609 for females. The per capita income for the city was $22,275. About 11.5% of families and 16.3% of the population were below the poverty line, including 15.2% of those under 18 and 17.4% of those 65 or over.

Sapulpa Middle School in August of 2026

== Education ==
Sapulpa Public Schools covers the vast majority of Sapulpa. The following school districts in Creek County have other portions: Lone Star Public School (elementary school district), Allen-Bowden Public School (elementary school district), Pretty Water Public School (elementary school district), Tulsa Public Schools, Kellyville Public Schools, and Kiefer Public Schools. Tulsa Public Schools cover portions of Sapulpa in Tulsa County.

As of 2013 the Sapulpa Creek Community Center has Muscogee Creek language classes.

== Culture ==
Sapulpa has an organization known as Sapulpa Main Street, one of the various national Main Street programs, the purpose of which is to preserve and enhance the cultural heritage of the town, and to improve its quality of life, by revitalizing the central business district as the center of the community.

== Historical sites ==
Berryhill Building in downtown Sapulpa in August of 2026

These NRHP-listed sites are in Sapulpa:

- Berryhill Building (14-20 E. Dewey)
- Bridge No. 18 at Rock Creek (the junction of old US Route 66 and Rock Creek)
- Creek County Courthouse (222 E. Dewey Ave.)
- John Frank House (1300 Luker Ln.)
- McClung House (708 S. Main St.)
- Sapulpa Downtown Historic District (roughly bounded by Hobson Ave, Elm St., Lee Ave, and Main St)
- West Sapulpa Route 66 Roadbed (junction of Ozark Trail of State 66 1/4 mile west of Sahoma Lake Rd)

== Parks and recreation ==
Sahoma Lake in August of 2026

The Sapulpa Parks and Recreation System includes 21 parks and recreation facilities, including 501 land acres; 16 sites are considered developed and open to the public, while five are not yet developed. Kelly Lane Park Trail, Liberty Park Trail, Davis Park Trail, Hollier Park Trail, and Pretty Water Lake Trail offer 1/4-mile to 1-mile walking experiences.

Among other facilities is Pretty Water Lake, spring-fed and 25-acres large, open for fishing and stocked with trout and channel catfish/panfish.

Sahoma Lake covers 277 acres, and fishing opportunities there include largemouth bass, smallmouth bass, channel catfish, crappie, perch, blue gill, and redear perch.

In August 2021, a new $600,000 playground was opened at Liberty Park called the "Everyday Heroes" inclusive playground. The playground has specific areas designed for 2- to 5-year-olds, 5- to 12-year-olds, and adults.

== Notable people ==
- Bob Ballinger, Republican member of the Arkansas House of Representatives, taught history in Sapulpa from 1999 to 2002.
- The Collins Kids, musicians, Lorrie and Larry Collins, resided near Sapulpa in the early 1950s.
- Joe Haymes, jazz orchestra leader, lived here for extended periods in the 1940s and '50s.
- Regina Holliday, art teacher, artist, muralist, and patient rights advocate, graduated from Sapulpa High School.
- William Miller Jenkins (1856–1941), a native Ohioan, was appointed as the fifth governor of the Territory of Oklahoma in 1901. He moved to Sapulpa in 1920, where he lived for the rest of his life.
- George William Miller (1925–2006), former U.S. Secretary of the Treasury under President Carter from August 6, 1979, to January 20, 1981, was previously the 11th chairman of the Federal Reserve
- Shara Nova, lead singer and songwriter for My Brightest Diamond, was a former backup vocalist for Sufjan Stevens and the frontwoman of Awry.
