= Oklahoma State Highway 97 =

Highway in Oklahoma

State Highway 97

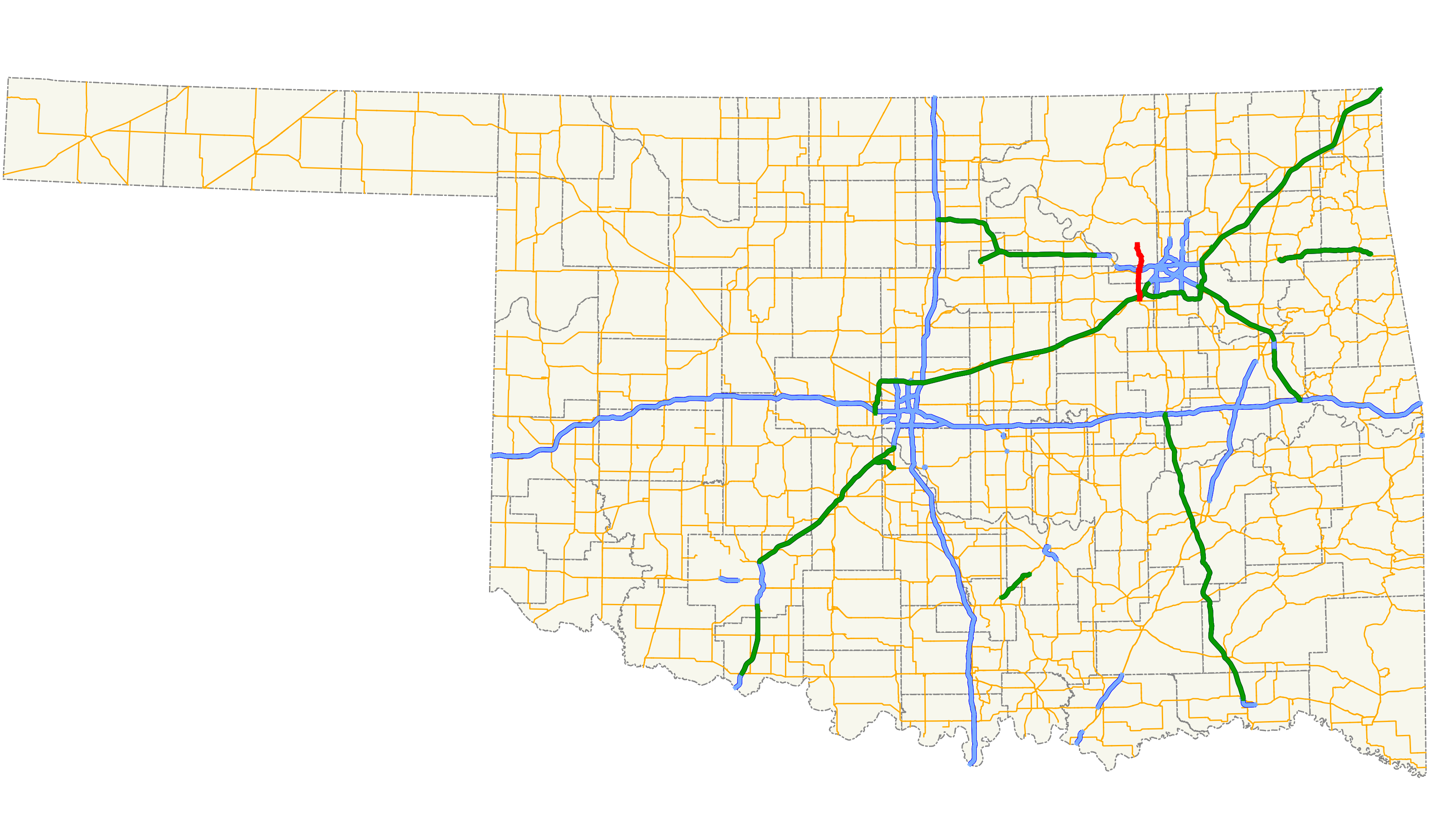

Route information
- Maintained by ODOT
- Length: 19.86 mi (31.96 km)
- Existed: February 3, 1952–present

Major junctions
- South end: US 75 Alt. / SH-33 / SH-66 in Sapulpa
- I-44 / Turner Turnpike in Sapulpa; US 64 / US 412 / SH-51 in Sand Springs
- North end: Zink Ranch

Location
- Country: United States
- State: Oklahoma

Highway system
- Oklahoma State Highway System; Interstate; US; State; Turnpikes
← SH-96	→ SH-98

State Highway 97 (abbreviated SH-97) is a 19.86-mile (31.96 km) state highway, maintained by the U.S. state of Oklahoma. It connects two towns in the northeast part of the state: Sapulpa and Sand Springs. Several communities of West Tulsa are along the road between these two towns, including Pretty Water, Allen, and Prattville.

SH-97 has existed since 1952. The highway had a lettered spur, SH-97T, for one year, but it is no longer on the state highway system.

== Route description ==
State Highway 97 begins in Sapulpa at an intersection that serves as the terminus of two other highways—U.S. Route 75 Alternate and State Highway 33 (SH-66 also passes through the intersection). From this point, the highway heads north toward the Turner Turnpike (I-44), which it has an interchange with. At the northern outskirts of Sapulpa, it serves as the western terminus of SH-166, a short spur route. The highway then passes through unincorporated areas of northeast Creek County.

At W. 61st Street S., the road crosses into Tulsa County. About one mile (1.6 km) north of the county line, SH-97 enters Prattville, a neighborhood of Sand Springs. At the north end of the town, the highway intersects SH-51 and begins a concurrency with it. The two routes cross the Arkansas River into the main part of Sand Springs together. SH-97 then has an interchange with the Sand Springs Expressway, a freeway which carries US-64 and US-412; SH-51 merges onto the eastbound freeway, bound for downtown Tulsa.

SH-97 continues straight ahead on North Wilson Avenue, then turns right onto West 2nd Street and passes through downtown Sand Springs. The highway turns back to the north at McKinley Avenue. The highway continues north out of town until reaching a T intersection, where it continues by turning right. (The left turn at this intersection is former SH-97T; see below). The highway continues north through southeast Osage County to the Zink Ranch. The highway ends at Rock School Road in front of the ranch.

== History ==
State Highway 97 was originally commissioned on February 3, 1952. At this time, the highway extended from Sapulpa (at its present-day southern terminus, where it intersected what was then US-66) to the southern SH-51 junction, which also carried US-64 (as the Keystone Expressway had not yet been built). The highway was extended north into Osage County on October 15, 1956. The only changes that have occurred since then are relatively minor changes in alignment through Sand Springs and Sapulpa.

== Spurs ==
=== SH-166 ===
State Highway 166
- Location: Sapulpa
- Length: 0.69 mi (1,110 m)

State Highway 166 is a very short highway in Creek County. It runs for 0.69 miles (1.11 km) through Sapulpa, from SH-97 to Frankoma Road, the alignment of old Route 66. The eastern terminus of SH-166 serves Frankoma Pottery.

=== SH-97T ===
State Highway 97T
- Location: Sand Springs
- Existed: January 17, 2003–January 2004

SH-97 once had a truck bypass connecting to it, State Highway 97T. This highway was decommissioned one year after it was designated.

== Junction list ==
County	Location	mi	km	Destinations	Notes
Creek	Sapulpa	0.0	0.0	US 75 Alt. / SH-33 / SH-66	Southern terminus, northern terminus of SH-75A, eastern terminus of SH-33
Creek	Sapulpa	1.1	1.8	I-44 Toll / Turner Turnpike	Interchange, exit 215
Creek		1.6	2.6	SH-166	Western terminus of SH-166
Tulsa	Sand Springs	8.5	13.7	SH-51	Southern end of SH-51 concurrency
Tulsa	Sand Springs	9.7	15.6	US 64 / US 412 / SH-51	Interchange, northern end of SH-51 concurrency
Osage	Zink Ranch	20.0	32.2	Rock School Road	Northern terminus
1.000 mi = 1.609 km; 1.000 km = 0.621 mi: Concurrency terminus
