= Oklahoma State Highway 67 =

State highway in Oklahoma, United States

State Highway 67

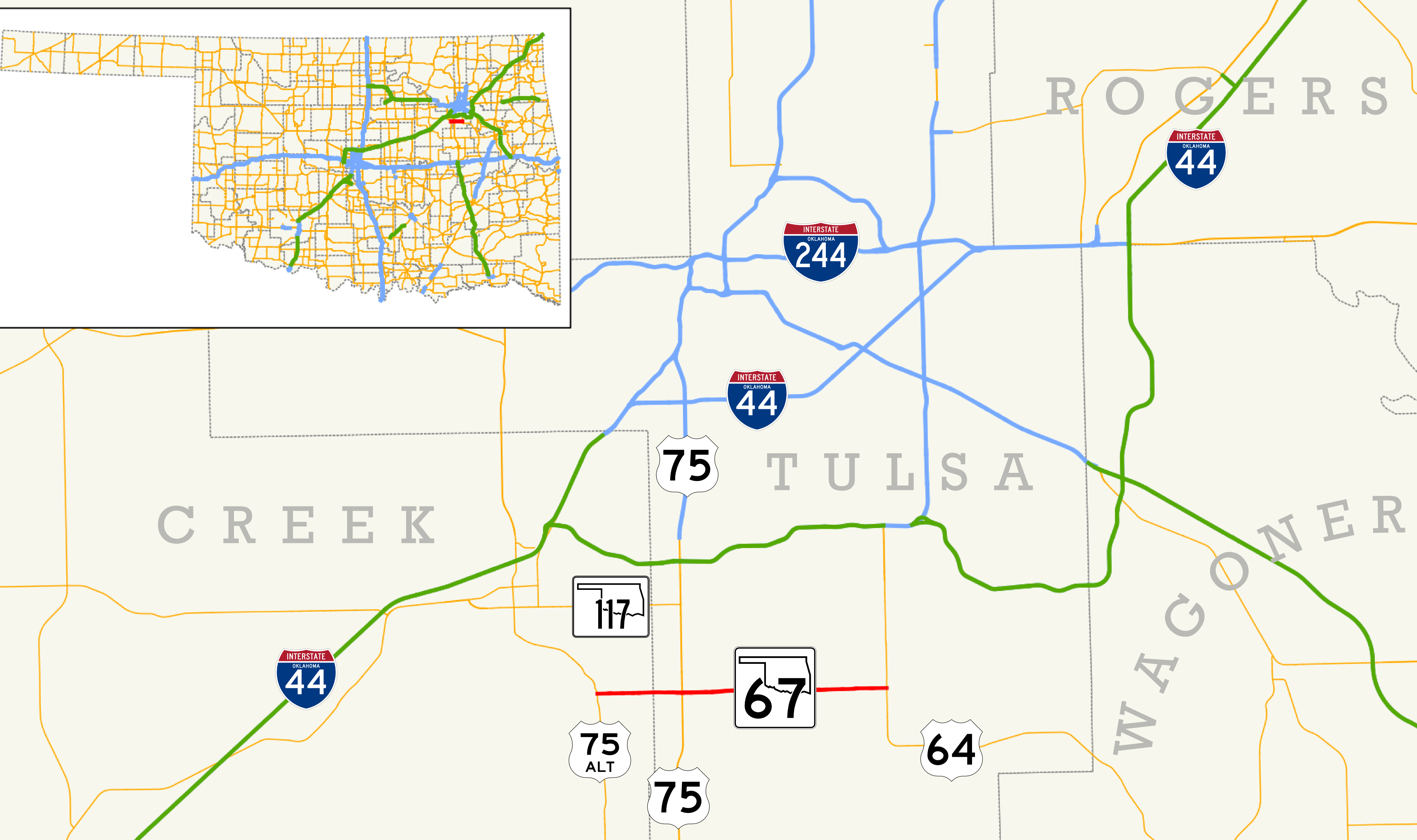

Route information
- Maintained by ODOT
- Length: 9.94 mi (16.00 km)
- Existed: May 21, 1936–present

Major junctions
- West end: US 75 Alt. in Kiefer
- US 75 in Glenpool
- East end: US 64 in Bixby

Location
- Country: United States
- State: Oklahoma

Highway system
- Oklahoma State Highway System; Interstate; US; State; Turnpikes
← SH-66	→ US 69

State Highway 67, abbreviated as SH-67, is a 9.94-mile-long (16.00 km) highway on the south side of Tulsa. It begins in the west at U.S. Route 75 Alternate in Kiefer and runs east along 151st St. South before ending at US-64 in Bixby. Along the way it crosses US-75 in Glenpool. It has no lettered spur routes.

SH-67 was first established in 1936. Throughout much of its early years, the highway's extent was in flux, at various times serving towns such as Mounds, Drumright, Sapulpa, and Coweta.

== Route description ==
State Highway 67 is split between the counties of Creek and Tulsa County. The first 1.92 miles (3.09 km) of the route lie in Creek County, while the remainder of the route, 8.02 miles (12.91 km), falls within Tulsa County.

SH-67 begins at US-75 ALT in downtown Kiefer. The highway heads east from here, crossing into Tulsa County just under two miles east of town. About a mile after crossing the county line, SH-67 has an interchange with US-75, the Okmulgee Bee-Line. The route then proceeds east to Memorial Drive (US-64 in Bixby), where it reaches its eastern terminus.

== History ==
SH-67 was first commissioned on May 21, 1936, serving in the same capacity—connecting US 75 to US 64 south of Tulsa—as it does now, though with a much different route. The original SH-67 began at US-75 in Mounds (US-75 at the time using the present-day route of US-75 ALT) and continuing east through far southern Tulsa County, reaching US-64 south of Bixby. The first extension to SH-67 occurred just over one month into the highway's life, on June 23, 1936. This extended the designation north along US-75 to Sapulpa. From here, it ran concurrent with US-66 out of town, splitting from US-66 to follow present-day SH-33 (which at this time followed SH-51 en route to downtown Tulsa) and coming to an end in Drumright.

The original part of SH-67, from Mounds to Bixby, was removed from the highway on December 31, 1937. SH-67 was re-extended to Bixby on June 7, 1943, following a more northerly route, branching off from US-75 in Kiefer, similar to the present-day one (although the final realignment of this section was not established until 1971).

The western part of SH-67, from Drumright to Sapulpa was truncated on May 8, 1951. This, along with the realignment of August 9, 1971, brought about SH-67 as it exists today.

The SH-67 designation was assigned to another segment of highway east of the present-day route. On October 15, 1956, a section of gravel road beginning at the Tulsa–Wagoner County line and extending into Coweta was added to the highway system as SH-67. This segment of highway was decommissioned on November 10, 1969.

== Junction list ==
County	Location	mi	km	Destinations	Notes
Creek	Kiefer	0.0	0.0	US 75 Alt.	Western terminus
Tulsa	Glenpool	2.9	4.7	US 75	Interchange
Tulsa	Bixby	9.9	15.9	US 64	Eastern terminus
1.000 mi = 1.609 km; 1.000 km = 0.621 mi
