= Liberty, Oklahoma =

Liberty
- Town
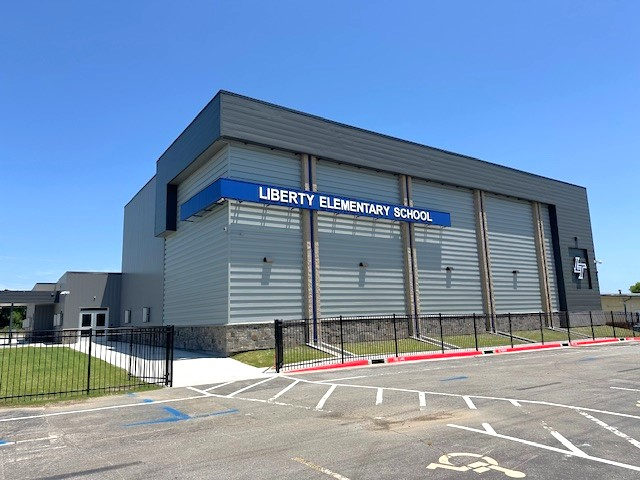
- Liberty School, on the town’s border, in July 2025

- Location within Tulsa County and the state of Oklahoma
- Coordinates: 35°51′06″N 95°58′47″W
- Country: United States
- State: Oklahoma
- County: Okmulgee and Tulsa

Area
  - Total: 6.14 sq mi (15.91 km^{2})
  - Land: 6.14 sq mi (15.91 km^{2})
- Elevation: 673 ft (205 m)

Population (2020)
  - Total: 153
  - Density: 24.9/sq mi (9.62/km^{2})
- Time zone: UTC-6 (CST)
  - Summer (DST): UTC-5 (CDT)
- FIPS code: 40-42860
- GNIS feature ID: 2412894

Liberty is a town that sits astride the line dividing Okmulgee and Tulsa counties in the U.S. state of Oklahoma. As of the 2020 census, the population is 153.

== History ==
The earliest settler recorded in this area was Wallace W. Baird, a farmer from Illinois, who arrived in Tulsa County in 1912, and settled on a 40-acre (16 ha) farm. Liberty was incorporated as a dispersed rural community on October 1, 1978. It incorporated a second time on June 29, 1982.

== Geography ==
Liberty is east of Mounds, south of both Tulsa and Glenpool, and north of both Okmulgee and Preston, directly on the east side of U.S. Route 75.

According to the United States Census Bureau, the town has a total area of 6.1 square miles (15.8 km^{2}), all land.

== Demographics ==
According to the 2020 census, Liberty has a population of 153 people in 77 households. 62% of the town's population is White. Liberty has 24.9 inhabitants per square mile (9.6/km^{2}). The town's median income is $54,417, and 5.1% of its population is below the poverty line.

Historical population
Census	Pop.	Note	%±
1980	19		—
1990	155		715.8%
2000	184		18.7%
2010	220		19.6%
2020	153		−30.5%
U.S. Decennial Census

== Economy ==
Agriculture has been the base of the town economy. By 2000, over 86 percent of the inhabitants commuted to work in other towns.

== "Liberty Mounds" ==
The signs on US Route 75 pointing in the direction of Liberty east of the highway refer to "Liberty Mounds". The Liberty town name was taken from the nearby Liberty School District. Given the district's proximity to Mounds, Oklahoma on the west side of US-75, a former school superintendent referred to the district as "Liberty Mounds" to distinguish it from another Liberty school district near Morris in Okmulgee County. So the highway signs reference the school, although both the town and the school district are actually named Liberty.
