= Oklahoma State Highway 117 =

State highway in Oklahoma, United States

State Highway 117
- SH-117 in red, SH-117A in blue

Route information
- Maintained by ODOT
- Length: 7.43 mi (11.96 km)

Major junctions
- West end: SH-33 / SH-66 west of Sapulpa
- East end: US 75 in Glenpool

Location
- Country: United States
- State: Oklahoma

Highway system
- Oklahoma State Highway System; Interstate; US; State; Turnpikes
← SH-116	→ SH-120

State Highway 117 (abbreviated SH-117) is a state highway in the Tulsa, Oklahoma metropolitan area. The majority of the 7.43-mile (11.96 km) highway is in Creek County, with the easternmost 1.01 miles (1.63 km) in Tulsa County. SH-117 has one lettered spur in the city of Sapulpa, Oklahoma.

== Route description ==
SH-117 begins at SH-66 just west of Sapulpa. It briefly runs in an arc curving southeast-to-east before heading seven miles (11 km) east. SH-117 ends in Glenpool at US-75.

SH-117 is known as Taft Avenue in Creek County, and 121st Street South in Tulsa County.

== History ==
SH-117 was extended east along US-75, 71st Street South, and Peoria Avenue in Tulsa to Interstate 44 in 1983, coinciding with the imminent opening of the 71st Street bridge across the Arkansas River. The eastern end was truncated back to its original ending at US-75 before 1990.

== Junction list ==
County	Location	mi	km	Destinations	Notes
Creek		0.0	0.0	SH-33 / SH-66	Western terminus
Creek	Sapulpa	1.7	2.7	US 75 Alt.	
Creek	Sapulpa	2.5	4.0	SH-117A	Southern terminus of SH-117A
Tulsa	Jenks–Glenpool line	7.4	11.9	US 75	Eastern terminus
1.000 mi = 1.609 km; 1.000 km = 0.621 mi

== Spurs ==
State Highway 117A
- Location: Sapulpa, Oklahoma
- Length: 0.73 mi (1,170 m)

SH-117 has one lettered spur, SH-117A, which connects SH-117 to SH-66 along Mission Street in Sapulpa. It is 0.73 miles (1.17 km) long and lies entirely within Sapulpa city limits and Creek County.
