= Kiefer, Oklahoma =

Town in Oklahoma, US

- Town
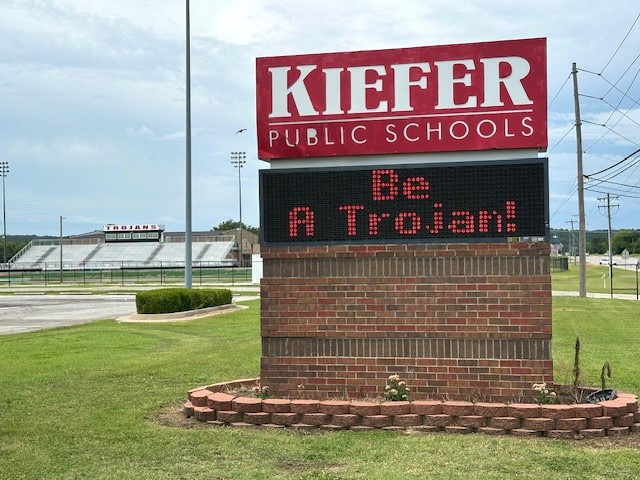
- Kiefer's Public School in July of 2025

- Location within Creek County, and the state of Oklahoma
- Coordinates: 35°56′39″N 96°03′10″W
- Country: United States
- State: Oklahoma
- County: Creek
- Established: November 20, 1901

Area
  - Total: 2.41 sq mi (6.23 km^{2})
  - Land: 2.38 sq mi (6.16 km^{2})
  - Water: 0.027 sq mi (0.07 km^{2})
- Elevation: 696 ft (212 m)

Population (2020)
  - Total: 2,187
  - Density: 919.3/sq mi (354.96/km^{2})
- Time zone: UTC-6 (Central (CST))
  - Summer (DST): UTC-5 (CDT)
- ZIP code: 74041
- Area codes: 539/918
- FIPS code: 40-39750
- GNIS feature ID: 2412832
- Website: townofkiefer.org

Kiefer is a town in Creek County, Oklahoma, United States. The population was 2,187 at the 2020 census, a 30% increase over the 1,685 population recorded at the 2010 census, which itself was a 64 percent increase over the 1,026 figure recorded in 2000.

== History ==
Kiefer was originally known as "Praper" when a post office was first established in 1901. The St. Louis, Oklahoma and Southern Railway (later the St. Louis and San Francisco Railway) constructed a line south from Sapulpa through Praper between 1900 and 1901. The route is today operated by BNSF. Praper became an oil boom town by 1906, when it grew into a major shipping point for crude from the Glenn Pool field. The post office was renamed "Kiefer" on December 12, 1906. According to the Encyclopedia of Oklahoma History and Culture, the name honored at least one of three different people named Kiefer who lived in the area.

Kiefer voted to incorporate on November 20, 1908. The 1910 census reported a population of 1,197 inhabitants. This increased to 1,663 in 1920.

In the early days, Kiefer was on the route of the Sapulpa & Interurban Railway (“S&I”) streetcar/interurban line connecting to Tulsa through Sapulpa; S&I subsequently went through a series of mergers and name changes, with only the Tulsa-to-Sapulpa portion continuing as the Tulsa-Sapulpa Union Railway.

The Kiefer Searchlight was a weekly newspaper published in Kiefer that included local, state, and national news along with advertising. 123 issues from 1908 to 1911 are available online.

In the 21st century, Kiefer is mostly a commuter town, with 94.6 percent of workers living in town commuting to jobs elsewhere, primarily in Tulsa. However, it is also headquarters for Bridge Crane Specialists, a company involved in the design, manufacturing, installation, and servicing of overhead and work station crane systems.

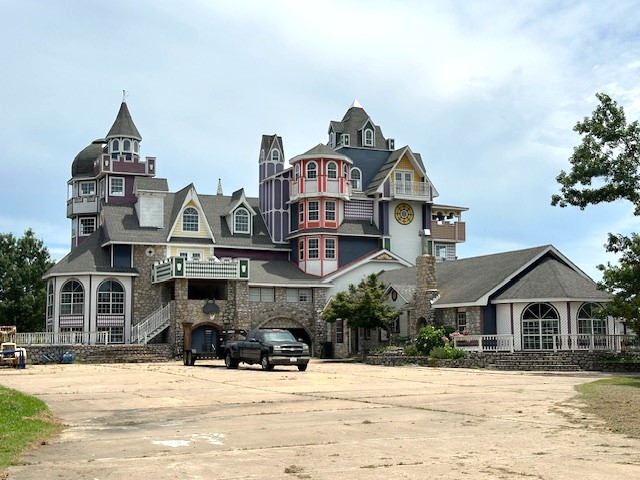
"Kiefer Castle" in July of 2025

Kiefer is the site of an extensive residence known to locals as the Kiefer Castle, having been built to resemble a fairy-tale castle.

== Geography ==
Kiefer is located in eastern Creek County. U.S. Highway 75A passes through the center of the town, leading north 5 miles (8 km) to the center of Sapulpa, the county seat, and south 5 miles (8 km) to Mounds. Oklahoma State Highway 67 leads east from Kiefer 3 miles (5 km) to the U.S. Route 75 freeway in Glenpool. Via Highways 67 and 75 it is 18 miles (29 km) north to downtown Tulsa.

According to the United States Census Bureau, Kiefer has a total area of 2.4 square miles (6.1 km^{2}), of which 0.02 square miles (0.06 km^{2}), or 1.04%, is water.

== Education ==
The vast majority of the territory is in the Kiefer Public Schools school district.

The Kiefer district has an elementary, middle, and high school. The school teams are known as the Trojans. At Kiefer public schools, they have many sports such as football, basketball, and baseball, but there are other sports like academic, softball, and E-sports.

A piece of the municipal territory extends into the Mounds Public Schools school district.

== Demographics ==
Historical population
Census	Pop.	Note	%±
1910	1,197		—
1920	1,663		38.9%
1930	606		−63.6%
1940	330		−45.5%
1950	275		−16.7%
1960	489		77.8%
1970	803		64.2%
1980	912		13.6%
1990	962		5.5%
2000	1,026		6.7%
2010	1,685		64.2%
2020	2,187		29.8%
U.S. Decennial Census

=== 2020 census ===
As of the 2020 census, Kiefer had a population of 2,187. The median age was 34.2 years. 29.0% of residents were under the age of 18 and 11.8% of residents were 65 years of age or older. For every 100 females there were 91.8 males, and for every 100 females age 18 and over there were 90.2 males age 18 and over.

94.1% of residents lived in urban areas, while 5.9% lived in rural areas.

There were 768 households in Kiefer, of which 44.3% had children under the age of 18 living in them. Of all households, 55.9% were married-couple households, 13.4% were households with a male householder and no spouse or partner present, and 22.8% were households with a female householder and no spouse or partner present. About 17.7% of all households were made up of individuals and 6.7% had someone living alone who was 65 years of age or older.

There were 808 housing units, of which 5.0% were vacant. The homeowner vacancy rate was 0.2% and the rental vacancy rate was 8.0%.

Racial composition as of the 2020 census
Race	Number	Percent
White	1,497	68.4%
Black or African American	21	1.0%
American Indian and Alaska Native	309	14.1%
Asian	13	0.6%
Native Hawaiian and Other Pacific Islander	3	0.1%
Some other race	77	3.5%
Two or more races	267	12.2%
Hispanic or Latino (of any race)	164	7.5%

=== 2000 census ===
As of the census of 2000, there were 1,026 people, 373 households, and 281 families residing in the town. The population density was 561.3 inhabitants per square mile (216.7/km^{2}). There were 410 housing units at an average density of 224.3 per square mile (86.6/km^{2}).

The median income for a household in the town was $34,844, and the median income for a family was $42,500. Males had a median income of $30,739 versus $22,386 for females. The per capita income for the town was $14,479. About 7.8% of families and 11.6% of the population were below the poverty line, including 13.4% of those under age 18 and 13.8% of those age 65 or over.
