= George E. R. Kinnear II =

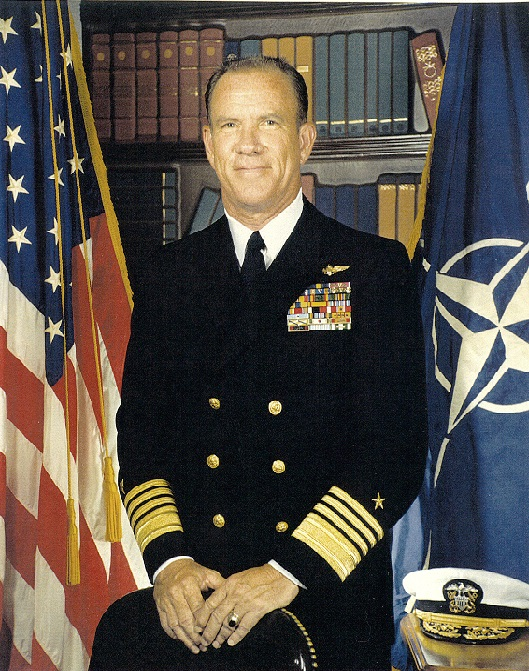
- Born: George Espy Ridgeway Kinnear II; January 12, 1928; Mounds, Oklahoma, US
- Died: August 9, 2015 (aged 87); York Harbor, Maine, US
- Military career
- Allegiance: United States of America
- Branch: United States Navy
- Service years: 1945–1982
- Rank: Admiral
- Nickname: Gus
- Commands: VFA-106 (1963-64), CVW-2 (1966-1968), CVBG-1 (1974-1975), AIRLANT(1978-1980), U.S. Military Representative - NATO Military Committee (1981-1982).
- Awards: Distinguished Service Medal w/ gold star (two awards), Legion of Merit w/ 3 gold stars and Combat "V" (four awards), Distinguished Flying Cross w/ 3 gold stars and Combat "V" (four awards), Air Medal w/ 3 silver stars and Combat "V" (sixteen awards), Navy Commendation Medal w/ 4 gold stars and Combat "V" (five awards).
- Other work: Vice President - Grumman Aerospace (1982-1988), President & Executive Vice President - University of New Hampshire (1988-1992), Vice-Chairman and CEO - New England Digital Corporation (1992), Chairman, eVelocity Corporation (1986-2002), Chairman, KCA LLC (2011-2015).

George Espy Ridgeway "Gus" Kinnear II (January 12, 1928 – August 9, 2015) was a four star admiral in the United States Navy who served as U.S. Military Representative, NATO Military Committee from 1981 to 1982. He was born in Mounds, Oklahoma. He attended George Washington University and Stanford University. Kinnear died on August 9, 2015, at the age of 87.

== Early life ==
Gus Kinnear was born January 28, 1928, in Mounds, a small town in Creek County, Oklahoma, and grew up in Brooksville, Florida. His parents were Neil and Mary Kinnear. He joined the U.S. Navy as a Seaman Recruit on January 28, 1945, shortly after his 17th birthday. A good student, he belatedly received his high school diploma from Hernando HS, Brooksville, FL, after voluntarily leaving early to join the war effort at age 17.

== Navy career ==
Kinnear was selected for pilot training in June, 1945, and was designated as a Naval Aviator in August, 1948. He was commissioned as Ensign in December, 1948. He flew several squadron tours before being sent to the Korean War, where he flew combat missions during 1953. During 1954–56, he served as head of the Legislative Correlation Section of the Bureau of Aeronautics. He was assigned to George Washington University (GWU) and Naval Postgraduate School from July, 1956 through July, 1958. While at GWU, he also earned a Master of Arts degree in Personnel Management and a Bachelor of Arts degree in Physical Science and Mathematics, both awarded in 1957. During this period, Kinnear was assigned to special duty in Warrenton, VA. He then served two years as ship's company on USS Antietam, and then graduated from the Naval War College in 1961.

After completing the Naval War College, Kinnear was assigned to a series of squadrons flying combat during the Vietnam War, where he was pilot, Operations Officer and Executive Officer, and then as commander of Attack Squadron 106 (1963–64). Continuing his formal education between assignments, he earned both a Master of Science in Industrial Engineering and a Doctor of Philosophy (Ph.D.) in Engineering Management from Stanford University in 1966. He was the commander of Air Wing Two through 1966-1968 fielding the first "all-jet" combat airwing. He piloted the A-4 and A-6 attack aircraft, the F-4 fighter, and the A-7 attack aircraft, which was at sea for first time and in its combat debut. He flew the first A-7 combat strike against enemy military positions in Hanoi. During this time he also few the RA-5, E-2, and A-3. He was serving in the Sea of Japan in 1968 when the North Koreans captured the USS Pueblo and provided contingency operations against North Korea for the National Command Authority.

Kinnear was then assigned to the Office of the Chief of Naval Operations as Special Assistant to the Director of Navy Program Planning. In January, 1970, he moved to the Office of Navy Comptroller as Assistant Comptroller for Cost Review and Reporting, and as a Special Assistant to the Assistant Secretary of the Navy for Financial Management. During this same period, he was a member of the George Washington University faculty, where he taught Political Economics in the School of Management Sciences. Returning to sea duty, he commanded the USS Spiegel Grove, the South Atlantic recovery vessel for the Apollo 13 lunar mission. Kinnear was then assigned as commander of NAS Miramar in San Diego, California in July, 1971, home of the Navy's "Top Gun" school, where he expanded the air station to enhance "Top Gun" and integrate the F-14 into the Pacific Fleet.

Kinnear was promoted to rear admiral and returned to sea as commander of Carrier Group Two in 1974–75, serving in the Tonkin Gulf, where he implemented the first digital sea-borne carrier battle group C4ISR system code named "Outlaw Hawk". After completing sea duty, he returned to Washington, D.C. where he became Assistant Chief of Naval Personnel and then Chief of Legislative Affairs for the Office of the Secretary of the Navy. In April, 1978, he was promoted to vice admiral, and put in command of the Naval Air Force Atlantic Fleet until July, 1981. At that time, he was promoted to Admiral and took over the duties of the U.S. Military Representative to the NATO Military Committee in July, 1981. He retired as a four-star Admiral in September, 1982.

According to Project Brown Shoes, Kinnear flew more different types of jet aircraft in combat than any other naval aviator, logged more than 5,000 hours of pilot flight time and performed more than 950 arrested carrier landings. He logged flight time in additional aircraft such as the C-5, C-130, C-131, KC-135, KC-137, C-141, and F-18.

=== Awards and honors ===
Kinnear earned a number of award and honors throughout his military career, some of the most noteworthy were:

- Air Medal (sixteen awards, Combat "V")
- Distinguished Flying Cross (four awards, Combat "V")
- Distinguished Service Medal (two awards)
- Legion of Merit (four awards, Combat "V")
- Navy Commendation Medal (five awards, Combat "V")

== Civilian life ==
Kinnear played football for the University of Florida and Florida State University, and he was an avid tennis player. After retiring from the Navy, Admiral Kinnear embraced a very active civilian life. In October, 1982, he joined Grumman Aerospace Corporation as a corporate vice president in its Washington, D.C. office, where he was specifically responsible for international corporate relations, and was later made Corporate Senior Vice President. From 1982 to 1994, he served as chairman of the Board of The Retired Officers' Association ([TROA]) in Washington, D. C. (Now "MOAA").

Kinnear served as a director on several boards including Compaq Corporation, where he was integral to the company's strategic decision to pursue standardized PC architecture, which was largely responsible for the development of modern plug & play technology in the PC industry. In addition, he served on the boards of The Aerospace Corporation, New England Digital, Navy Federal Credit Union (NFCU), Center for the Study of the Presidency (CSP), Association of Naval Aviation (ANA), the U.S. Navy Memorial (USNM), and the University of Southern California Business School.

Through 1988 to 1992, he was recruited to serve as Executive Vice President and President of the University of New Hampshire. In April 1992, he was invited to join the New England Digital Corporation in Lebanon, NH, where he served as Vice Chairman and chief executive officer through 1994. He co-founded IT start-up eVelocity Corporation at the Pease Tradeport, NH, in 1999, purchasing land from the transitioned former Pease Air Force Base, and served as chairman until the sale of the company in 2004. Kinnear published a biography with Jim Carter in 2014. He was the Chairman of KCA LLC management consulting company until his death in August 2015.
