= Bowden, Oklahoma =

Bowden
- Unincorporated community
- Location within the state of Oklahoma Bowden (the United States)
- Coordinates: 36°03′46″N 96°05′14″W
- Country: United States
- State: Oklahoma
- County: Creek
- Elevation: 774 ft (236 m)
- Time zone: UTC-6 (Central (CST))
  - Summer (DST): UTC-5 (CDT)
- GNIS feature ID: 1090424

Bowden, originally known as Taneha, is an unincorporated community in Creek County, Oklahoma, United States. It is located four miles north of Sapulpa, and is bisected by 433rd West Avenue and West 41st St. South. A post office operated in Bowden from June 9, 1909, to November 1, 1957. The community was named after Sapulpa merchant Rollandus A. Bowden. It developed as a boom town after the discovery of the Glenn Pool Oil Reserve. but today is a small town with approximately 225 people.
