= U.S. Route 75 Alternate (Beggs–Sapulpa, Oklahoma) =

Alternate highway route in Oklahoma, United States

U.S. Highway 75 Alternate
- US-75 Alt. highlighted in red

Route information
- Maintained by ODOT
- Length: 30.15 mi (48.52 km)
- Existed: August 28, 1959–present

Major junctions
- South end: US 75 / SH-16 east of Beggs
- North end: I-44 in Sapulpa (concurrent with SH-66)

Location
- Country: United States
- State: Oklahoma

Highway system
- United States Numbered Highway System; List; Special; Divided; Oklahoma State Highway System; Interstate; US; State; Turnpikes

U.S. 75 Alternate (also signed as U.S. Highway 75A or State Highway 75A) is a 30.15-mile (48.52 km) highway near Tulsa. The southern terminus is at U.S. Highway 75 and SH-16 east of Beggs. The northern terminus is signed at State Highway 66 and State Highway 97 in Sapulpa. However, the highway continues unsigned along SH-66, ending at the north terminus of the Turner Turnpike, where SH-66 merges onto the free portion of I-44. It runs parallel to US-75 for its entire length.

Except for the segment between new US-75 and Beggs, US-75 ALT follows the route of the old US-75 prior to the construction of the Okmulgee Beeline and that road's subsequent designation as US-75 in 1959.

== Route description ==
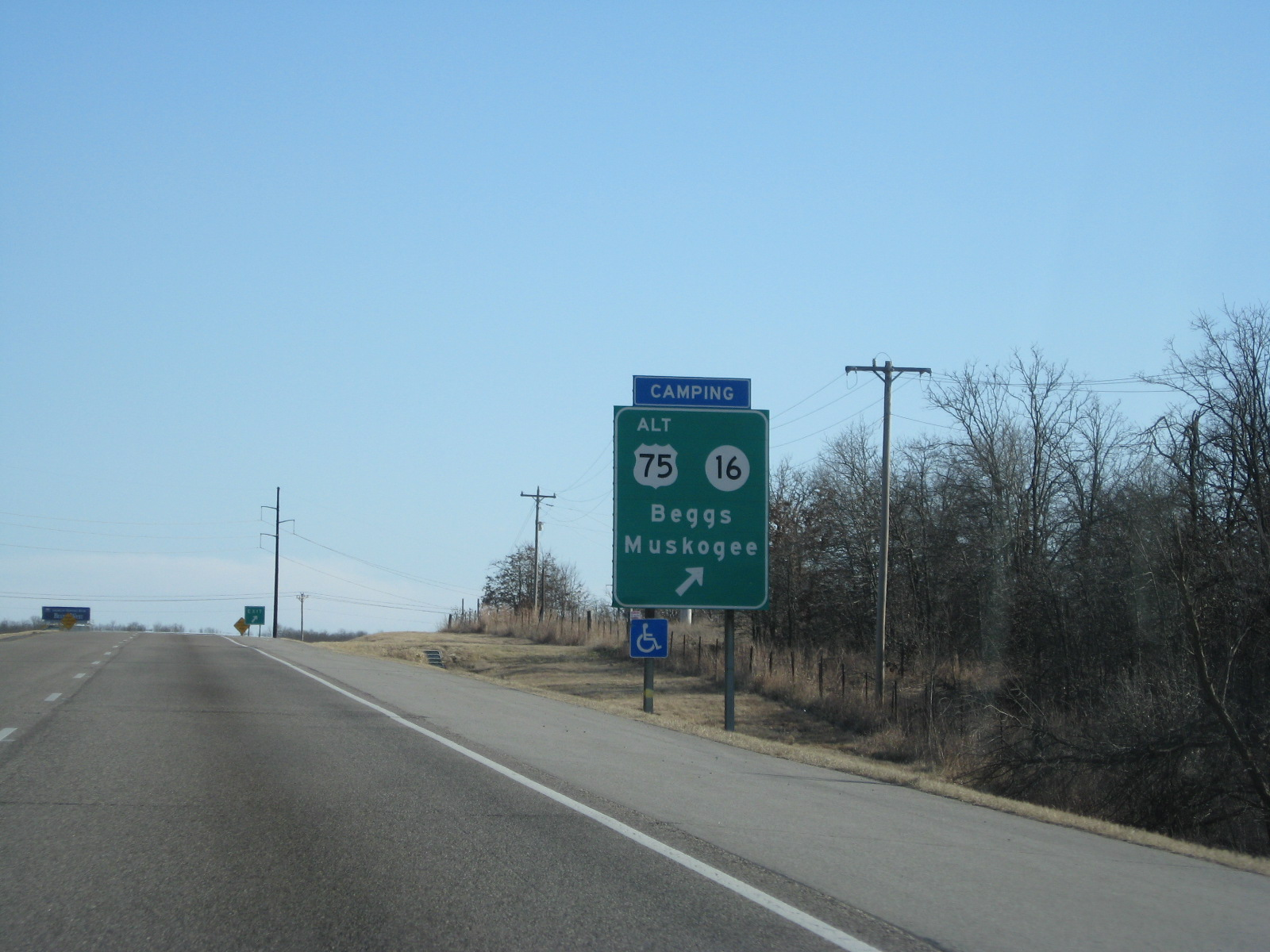
Signage for ALT US-75 and SH-16 at the former's southern terminus along US-75.

US-75 Alternate begins where SH-16 crosses under US-75 east of Beggs. West of this intersection, US-75 ALT is signed along with SH-16. The two highways continue west into the city of Beggs, where the partnership ends. US-75 ALT turns north onto the route of the old US-75, passing through Beggs and then rural areas of Okmulgee County on a due north course. The highway crosses into Creek County, then curves to the northeast for about 1 mile (1.6 km) before returning to a northerly course through Mounds. After passing through Mounds, US-75 ALT follows a route a few degrees west of due north, bringing it to the town of Kiefer, where it serves as the western terminus of SH-67.

From Kiefer, the highway turns northwest. The highway bridges Polecat Creek as it turns west to enter the city of Sapulpa. The route then turns back to the north as it gets closer the city's core. The highway intersects SH-117 in about the center of town. The road then intersects SH-33 and SH-66, while the mainline becomes SH-97. At this intersection, signage indicating the north end of US-75 ALT is posted.

Officially, however, US-75 ALT continues onward from here, turning right and following SH-66 through the east part of Sapulpa. This section of US-75 ALT is signed exclusively as SH-66. The road parallels I-44, the Turner Turnpike. The highways pass under the Creek Turnpike as well. Finally, as the Turner Turnpike comes to an end and I-44 transitions into a free Interstate, SH-66 merges onto the freeway. US-75 ALT ends at this point, just south of the Creek–Tulsa County line.

== History ==
US-75 ALT largely follows the route of the old US-75 before the "Okmulgee Beeline", the expressway/freeway between Okmulgee and Tulsa, was built. On August 28, 1959, the US-75 name was moved onto the new highway, and US-75 ALT was designated for the old highway. The old route of US-75 south of Beggs continues to be designated as Old Highway 75 into Okmulgee, at which point it is signed as North Oklahoma Avenue until 6th Street.

== Junction list ==
County	Location	mi	km	Destinations	Notes
Okmulgee		0.0	0.0	SH-16 continues east	
Okmulgee		0.0	0.0	US 75	Southern terminus
Okmulgee	Beggs	3.6	5.8	SH-16	Northern end of SH-16 concurrency
Creek	Kiefer	18.0	29.0	SH-67	Western terminus of SH-67
Creek	Sapulpa	22.6	36.4	SH-117	
Creek	Sapulpa	23.3	37.5	SH-33 / SH-66 / SH-97	Signed northern terminus of US-75 ALT, southern terminus of SH-97, eastern terminus of SH-33, southern end of SH-66 concurrency
Creek	Sapulpa	24.2	38.9	SH-117A	Northern terminus of SH-117A
Creek	Sapulpa	26.4	42.5	Creek Turnpike	No access to/from westbound Creek Tpk.
Creek	Sapulpa	30.2	48.6	I-44 / SH-66	Northern terminus of US-75 ALT, northern end of SH-66 concurrency
1.000 mi = 1.609 km; 1.000 km = 0.621 mi: Concurrency terminus; Incomplete access
