= Silver City, Oklahoma =

Coordinates: 36°05′25″N 96°29′40″W

Silver City
- Town
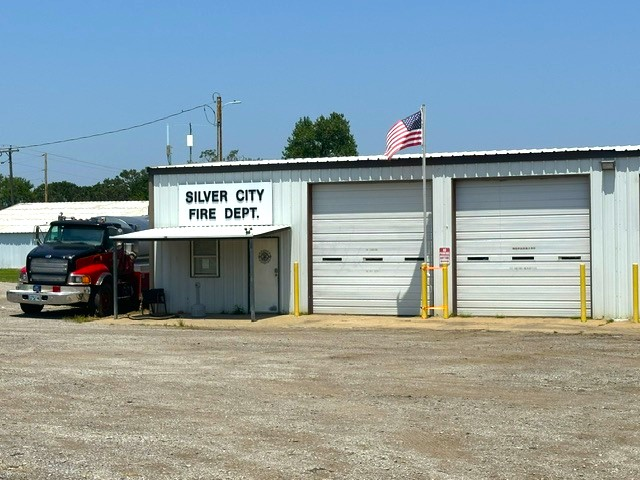
- Silver City Fire Department, July of 2026
- Interactive map of Silver City
- Country: United States
- State: Oklahoma
- County: Creek

Population (2010)
  - Total: 50
- Time zone: Central (CST)
  - Summer (DST): CDT

Silver City is a community situated between Tulsa and Stillwater in Creek County, Oklahoma, United States, about 10 minutes east of Oilton. It was once a farming and ranching community, though all that remains of the town is one abandoned convenience store, a fire department, a church, 10 homes, 50 people and a machine shop.

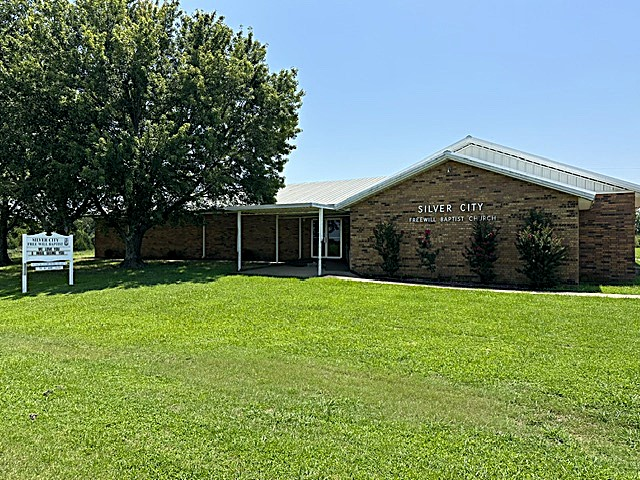
Silver City Freewill Baptist Church, 7-2026

This is not to be confused with the early Indian Territory settlement known as Silver City, which was north of Tuttle, Oklahoma, and which was relocated to become Minco, Oklahoma.
