= Gypsy, Oklahoma =

Unincorporated community in Oklahoma, US

Coordinates: 35°42′42″N 96°27′34″W

Gypsy is an unincorporated community in Creek County, in the U.S. state of Oklahoma. It is about twelve miles south-southwest of Bristow.

== History ==
A post office called Gypsy was established in 1925, and remained in operation until it was discontinued in 1955. Gypsy's local community took its name from the Gypsy Oil Company.
