= Mounds Observatory =

Astronomical observatory in the USA

ACT Observatory
- Organization: Astronomy Club of Tulsa
- Location: Oklahoma, United States
- Coordinates: 35°49.874′N 96°8.76′W
- Established: 1993
- Website: astrotulsa.com

The ACT Observatory is an astronomical observatory owned and operated by the Astronomy Club of Tulsa. It is located 30 miles (48 km) south of downtown Tulsa, Oklahoma, United States in the town of Mounds. It was also known as Mounds/RMCC Observatory before being renamed in 2010.

== See also ==
- List of astronomical observatories
