= Lawrence Creek, Oklahoma =

Town in Oklahoma, US

- Town
- Location within Creek County, and the state of Oklahoma
- Coordinates: 36°05′02″N 96°25′36″W
- Country: United States
- State: Oklahoma
- County: Creek
- Established: March 15, 1983

Area
  - Total: 0.69 sq mi (1.80 km^{2})
  - Land: 0.69 sq mi (1.80 km^{2})
  - Water: 0 sq mi (0.00 km^{2})
- Elevation: 755 ft (230 m)

Population (2020)
  - Total: 121
  - Density: 174.3/sq mi (67.31/km^{2})
- Time zone: UTC-6 (Central (CST))
  - Summer (DST): UTC-5 (CDT)
- FIPS code: 40-41760
- GNIS feature ID: 2412883

Lawrence Creek is a town in Creek County, Oklahoma, United States. Incorporated March 15, 1983, it is primarily a bedroom community whose employed residents work in Sapulpa and Tulsa. As of the 2020 census, Lawrence Creek had a population of 121.

== Geography ==
Lawrence Creek is located in northern Creek County. It is 24 miles (39 km) northwest of Sapulpa. Mannford, the closest neighboring town, is 6 miles (10 km) to the northeast, on Keystone Lake.

According to the United States Census Bureau, the town of Lawrence Creek has a total area of 0.73 square miles (1.9 km^{2}), all land.

== Demographics ==
Historical population
Census	Pop.	Note	%±
1990	97		—
2000	119		22.7%
2010	149		25.2%
2020	121		−18.8%
U.S. Decennial Census

=== 2020 census ===
As of the 2020 census, Lawrence Creek had a population of 121. The median age was 38.3 years. 26.4% of residents were under the age of 18 and 16.5% of residents were 65 years of age or older. For every 100 females there were 116.1 males, and for every 100 females age 18 and over there were 107.0 males age 18 and over.

0.0% of residents lived in urban areas, while 100.0% lived in rural areas.

There were 40 households in Lawrence Creek, of which 45.0% had children under the age of 18 living in them. Of all households, 50.0% were married-couple households, 22.5% were households with a male householder and no spouse or partner present, and 15.0% were households with a female householder and no spouse or partner present. About 12.5% of all households were made up of individuals and 0.0% had someone living alone who was 65 years of age or older.

There were 40 housing units, of which 0.0% were vacant. The homeowner vacancy rate was 0.0% and the rental vacancy rate was 0.0%.

Racial composition as of the 2020 census
Race	Number	Percent
White	90	74.4%
Black or African American	0	0.0%
American Indian and Alaska Native	15	12.4%
Asian	0	0.0%
Native Hawaiian and Other Pacific Islander	0	0.0%
Some other race	2	1.7%
Two or more races	14	11.6%
Hispanic or Latino (of any race)	4	3.3%

=== 2000 census ===
As of the census of 2000, there were 119 people, 40 households, and 33 families residing in the town. The population density was 184.7 inhabitants per square mile (71.3/km^{2}). There were 41 housing units at an average density of 63.6 per square mile (24.6/km^{2}). The racial makeup of the town was 89.92% White and 10.08% Native American. Hispanic or Latino of any race were 0.84% of the population.

There were 40 households, out of which 37.5% had children under the age of 18 living with them, 70.0% were married couples living together, 10.0% had a female householder with no husband present, and 17.5% were non-families. 15.0% of all households were made up of individuals, and 7.5% had someone living alone who was 65 years of age or older. The average household size was 2.98 and the average family size was 3.36.

In the town, the population was spread out, with 33.6% under the age of 18, 6.7% from 18 to 24, 31.1% from 25 to 44, 23.5% from 45 to 64, and 5.0% who were 65 years of age or older. The median age was 33 years. For every 100 females, there were 91.9 males. For every 100 females age 18 and over, there were 107.9 males.

The median income for a household in the town was $24,583, and the median income for a family was $28,750. Males had a median income of $24,286 versus $15,781 for females. The per capita income for the town was $9,957. There were no families and 2.9% of the population living below the poverty line, including no under eighteens and 28.6% of those over 64.

== Education ==
It is in the Olive Public Schools school district.
