= Mounds, Oklahoma =

Town in Oklahoma, US

Mounds, Oklahoma Cesse Tvlofv (Creek)
- Town
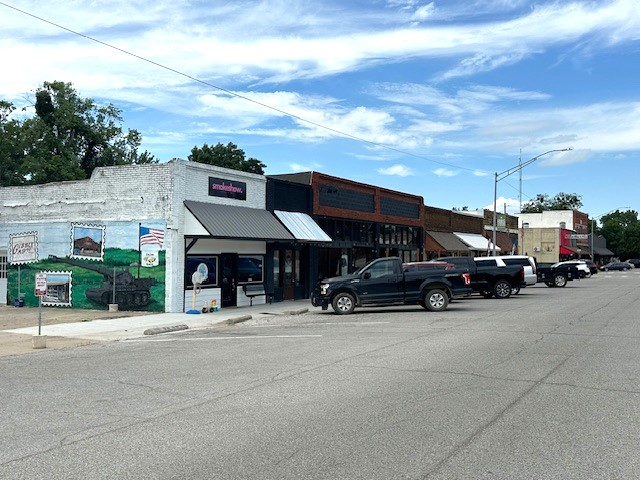
- Downtown Mounds in July of 2025

- Location within Creek County, and the state of Oklahoma
- Coordinates: 35°51′27″N 96°08′10″W
- Country: United States
- State: Oklahoma
- County: Creek

Area
  - Total: 2.30 sq mi (5.95 km^{2})
  - Land: 2.25 sq mi (5.82 km^{2})
  - Water: 0.050 sq mi (0.13 km^{2})
- Elevation: 758 ft (231 m)

Population (2020)
  - Total: 932
  - Density: 415.0/sq mi (160.22/km^{2})
- Time zone: UTC-6 (Central (CST))
  - Summer (DST): UTC-5 (CDT)
- ZIP code: 74047
- Area codes: 539/918
- FIPS code: 40-49550
- GNIS feature ID: 2413017
- Website: townofmounds.com

Mounds (Creek: Cesse Tvlofv) is a town in Creek County, Oklahoma, United States. It is located just south of Tulsa; the town's population was 932 at the 2020 census.

== History ==
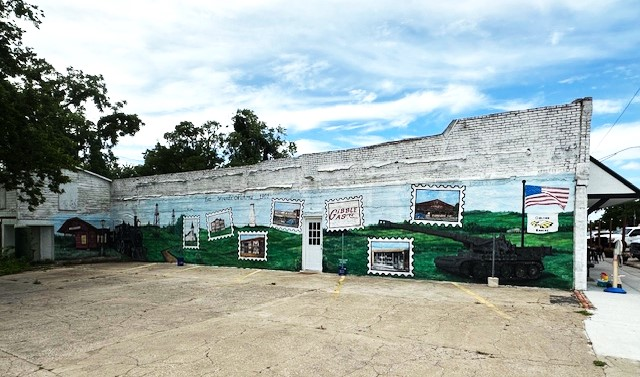
History mural in downtown Mounds, July 2025

The post office for this community was established in 1895 and originally named "Posey", for the Creek poet Alexander Posey, who lived in Eufaula, Oklahoma. In 1898, the town was moved 5 miles (8 km) southwest and renamed "Mounds" for twin hills that were nearby. By 1901, the St. Louis, Oklahoma and Southern Railway (later the St. Louis and San Francisco Railway) built a track through Mounds, and the town became an important cattle shipping point. Mounds incorporated as a city in the same year. The discovery of oil in the Glenn Pool field in 1905 turned Mounds into a shipping point for crude oil instead of cattle.

In the early days, Mounds was on the route of the Sapulpa & Interurban Railway (“S&I”) streetcar/interurban line connecting to Tulsa through Sapulpa, Kiefer and Glenpool; S&I subsequently went through a series of mergers and name changes, with only the Tulsa-to-Sapulpa portion continuing as the Tulsa-Sapulpa Union Railway.

Mounds had a population of 675 at statehood in 1907, rising to 701 in 1910. The oil boom played out in the 1920s, and the population declined from 1,078 in 1920 to 701 in 1930. Railroad activity became primarily shipping grain and cattle. As time went by, the population reached a low of 560 in 1950, since which it has increased. In the 21st century, Mounds is mostly a commuter town, with 92 percent of employed residents commuting to work primarily in Sapulpa and Tulsa.

== Geography ==
Mounds is located in eastern Creek County. U.S. Route 75A passes through the center of town, leading north 5 miles (8 km) to Kiefer and south 9 miles (14 km) to Beggs. Sapulpa, the Creek County seat, is 10 miles (16 km) north via U.S. 75A. U.S. Route 75 is 2.5 miles (4.0 km) east of Mounds via West 201st Street; downtown Tulsa is 22 miles (35 km) north of Mounds via U.S. 75.

According to the United States Census Bureau, the town of Mounds has a total area of 2.2 square miles (5.8 km^{2}), of which 2.2 square miles (5.7 km^{2}) is land and 0.04 square miles (0.1 km^{2}), or 2.20%, is water.

== Demographics ==
Historical population
Census	Pop.	Note	%±
1910	701		—
1920	1,078		53.8%
1930	740		−31.4%
1940	627		−15.3%
1950	560		−10.7%
1960	674		20.4%
1970	766		13.6%
1980	1,086		41.8%
1990	980		−9.8%
2000	1,153		17.7%
2010	1,168		1.3%
2020	932		−20.2%
U.S. Decennial Census

=== 2020 census ===
As of the 2020 census, Mounds had a population of 932. The median age was 39.6 years. 25.2% of residents were under the age of 18 and 19.5% of residents were 65 years of age or older. For every 100 females there were 97.9 males, and for every 100 females age 18 and over there were 93.6 males age 18 and over.

0.0% of residents lived in urban areas, while 100.0% lived in rural areas.

There were 376 households in Mounds, of which 37.5% had children under the age of 18 living in them. Of all households, 42.6% were married-couple households, 23.7% were households with a male householder and no spouse or partner present, and 29.3% were households with a female householder and no spouse or partner present. About 24.5% of all households were made up of individuals and 13.1% had someone living alone who was 65 years of age or older.

There were 452 housing units, of which 16.8% were vacant. The homeowner vacancy rate was 1.3% and the rental vacancy rate was 8.2%.

Racial composition as of the 2020 census
Race	Number	Percent
White	658	70.6%
Black or African American	6	0.6%
American Indian and Alaska Native	145	15.6%
Asian	2	0.2%
Native Hawaiian and Other Pacific Islander	1	0.1%
Some other race	13	1.4%
Two or more races	107	11.5%
Hispanic or Latino (of any race)	38	4.1%

=== 2000 census ===
As of the census of 2000, there were 1,153 people, 449 households, and 312 families residing in the town. The population density was 986.7 inhabitants per square mile (381.0/km^{2}). There were 500 housing units at an average density of 427.9 per square mile (165.2/km^{2}). The racial makeup of the town was 76.06% White, 1.21% African American, 15.61% Native American, 0.07% Asian, 1.21% from other races, and 5.81% from two or more races. Hispanic or Latino of any race were 1.82% of the population.

There were 449 households, out of which 34.1% had children under the age of 18 living with them, 50.6% were married couples living together, 12.2% had a female householder with no husband present, and 30.5% were non-families. 28.3% of all households were made up of individuals, and 15.4% had someone living alone who was 65 years of age or older. The average household size was 2.57 and the average family size was 3.10.

In the town, the population was spread out, with 29.3% under the age of 18, 9.1% from 18 to 24, 25.0% from 25 to 44, 22.4% from 45 to 64, and 14.2% who were 65 years of age or older. The median age was 35 years. For every 100 females, there were 93.5 males. For every 100 females age 18 and over, there were 92.2 males.

The median income for a household in the town was $27,050, and the median income for a family was $35,417. Males had a median income of $28,438 versus $18,750 for females. The per capita income for the town was $12,917. About 10.2% of families and 15.7% of the population were below the poverty line, including 17.5% of those under age 18 and 22.3% of those age 65 or over.

== Education ==
Almost all of the area is in the Mounds Public Schools school district. Some roads under the municipal government extend into other districts.

Enrollment in the Mounds public school district serves about 300 pupils. The district's overall student/teacher ratio is 14.5:1. There are 2 schools associated with the agency, which is classified as being in or near a rural area. Mounds allocates approximately $2,854 per pupil for instructional expenses.

Mounds is the site of the ACT Observatory, a small astronomical observatory maintained by the Astronomy Club of Tulsa.

== "Liberty Mounds" ==
There is no town of Liberty Mounds, despite the signs on US Route 75 pointing to Mounds on the west of the highway, and “Liberty Mounds” east of it. The town of Liberty, Oklahoma was originally incorporated in 1978 by the Spradling family precisely to avoid annexation of the area by other communities, including Mounds. The name was taken from the nearby Liberty School District, which a former school superintendent called “Liberty Mounds” to distinguish it from another Liberty school district near Morris in Okmulgee County. So the sign references the school, although both the town and the school district are actually named Liberty.

== Notable people ==
- Thomas Gilcrease (1890-1962), Oklahoma oilman, philanthropist, founder of Gilcrease Museum in Tulsa lived in Mounds during boyhood
- George E. R. Kinnear II (1928–2015), four star admiral in the United States Navy
- Reuben Wilson (born 1935), jazz organist
