= Tamac Pottery =

American pottery company

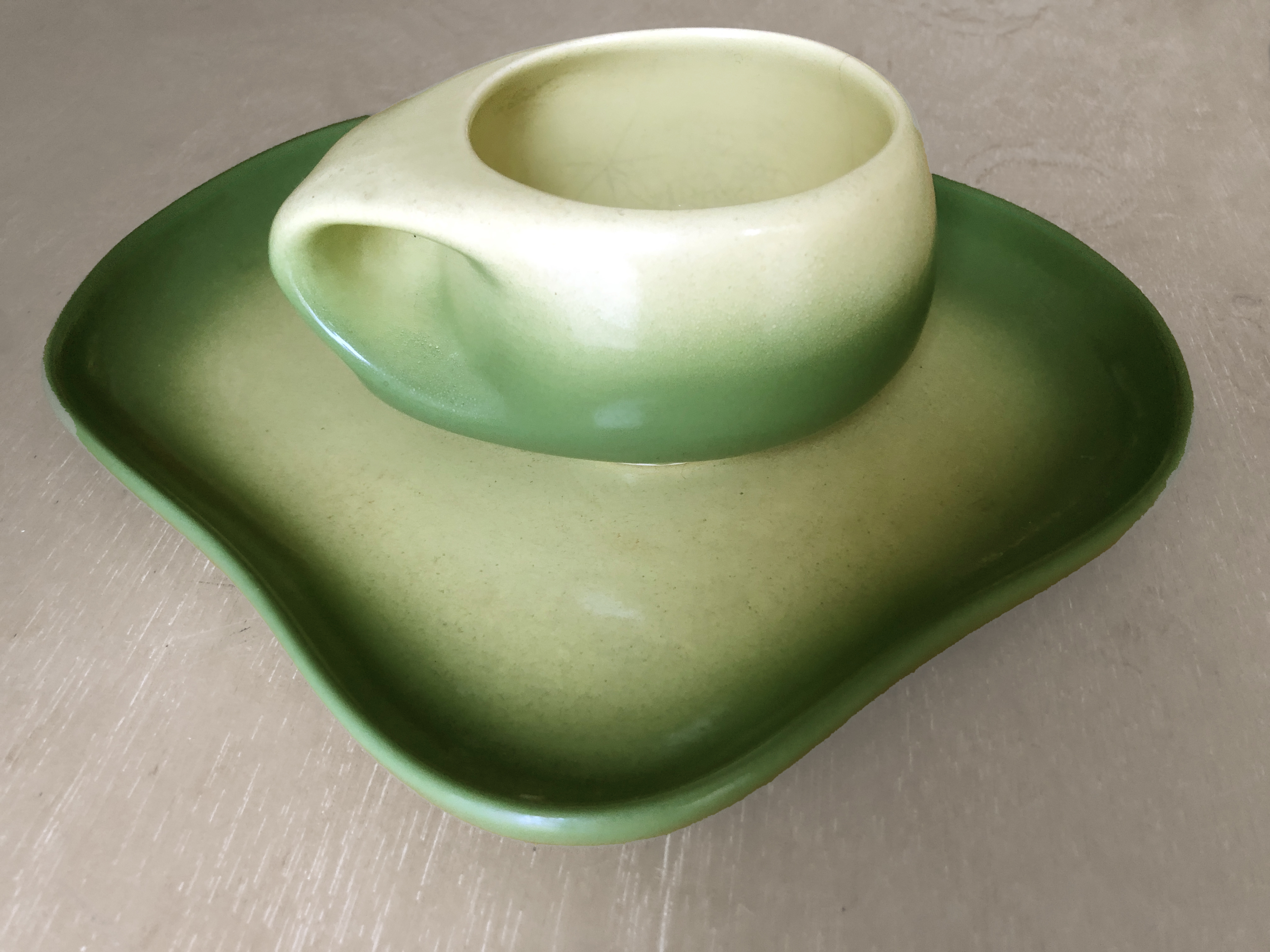
Tamac pottery, amoeboid-shaped plate and "one hander" cup

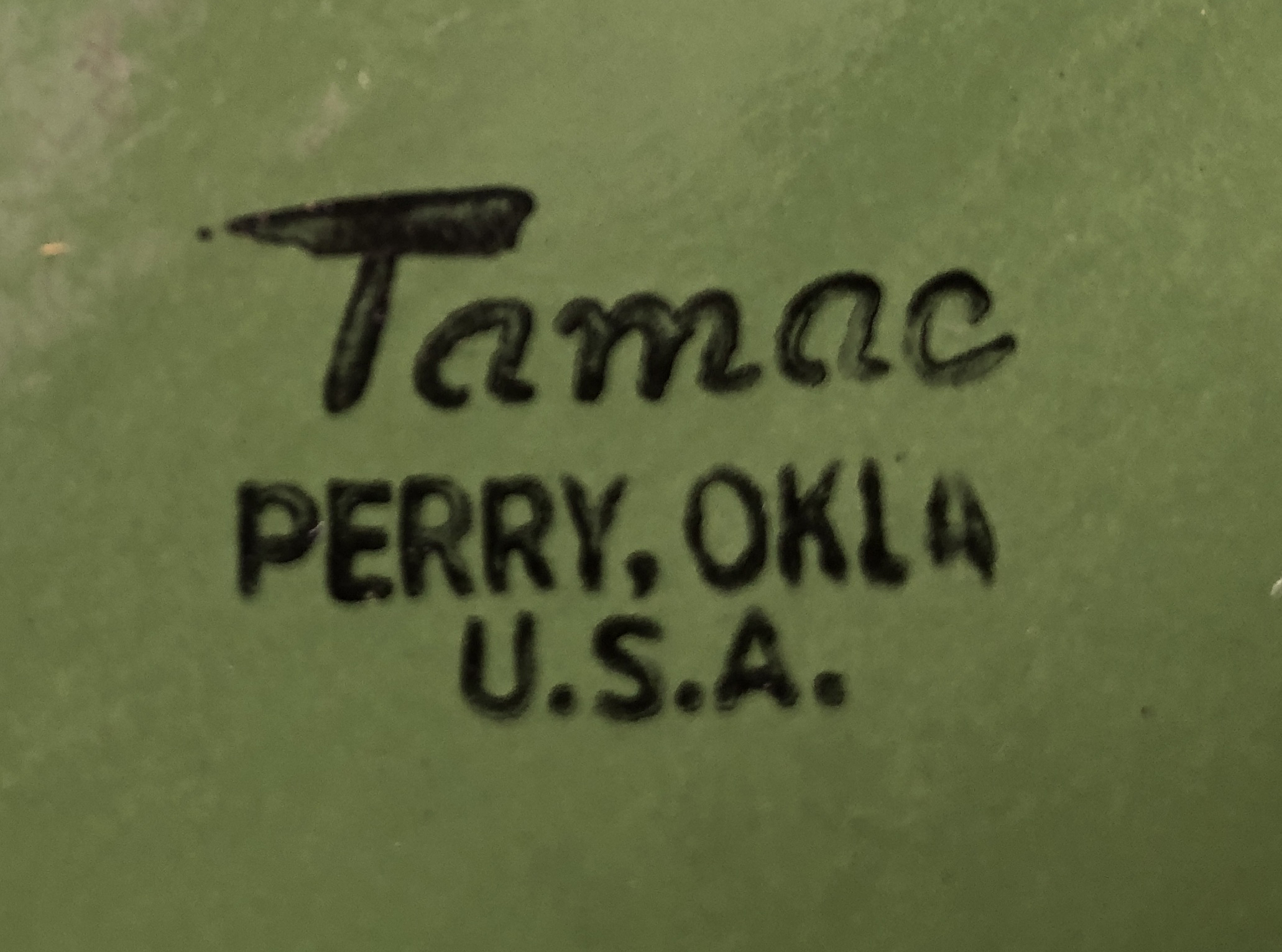
Tamac pottery mark

Tamac Pottery was a line of mid-century modern ceramic glazed dinnerware that was manufactured in Perry Oklahoma from 1946 to 1972. The stream-lined biomorphic pottery line included tableware and housewares.

== History ==
The Tamac pottery factory was located in a quonset hut in Perry, Oklahoma, that had previously been used during World War II by the military. The company was founded by Leonard Tate who grew up in Perry. After the war, he married Majorie Hemke [Tate]. Henry and Betty Macaulay joined the partnership in the Fall of 1946. Marjorie Tate had been formally trained in art (sculpture and design) at Brown University. She later went on to design floor coverings before starting the pottery business with her husband Leonard. In 1952 the Tate's sold the factory business to Earl Bechtold and his wife. Their son, Earl Bechtold took over the business in 1960 who ran it until selling the operation to Joseph and Mary Hladik. Mary and her daughter, Lenita Moore ran the business until its closure in 1972.

The irregularly-shaped glazed earthenware pottery was designed by Marjorie Tate, Leonard Tate, Betty Macaulay and Allen Macaulay. It has been exhibited in several museum exhibitions, including the Vital Forms: American Art and Design in the Atomic Age 1940–1960 show at the Brooklyn Museum and the Hot Cars, High Fashion, Cool Stuff. Designs of the 20th Century exhibition at the Dallas Museum of Art. Tamac produced pieces in several glaze colors of which avocado green with dark green airbrushed trim is the most common; other colors include gray, raspberry, "butterscotch" (yellow), and the frosty line consisting of three colors: "frosty pine", "frosty fudge, and "frosty pink" with white trim. The biomorphic-shaped dinnerware included dishes, bowls, cup and saucers and serving vessels, as well as vases, candle holders and other accessories, such as decorative "wall pockets". Several department stores in the region carried the Tamac line of tableware.

== Collections ==
Tamac pottery is held in the permanent collection of the Brooklyn Museum, the Dallas Museum of Art, the Indianapolis Museum of Art, the Boston Museum of Fine Arts, and other institutions.

== See also ==
- Frankoma Pottery
- Eva Zeisel
