= Creek County, Oklahoma =

County in Oklahoma, United States

- County
- Creek County Courthouse w/fountain in front and Wells Bldg in background, 8-2026

- Location within the U.S. state of Oklahoma
- Coordinates: 35°54′N 96°22′W
- Country: United States
- State: Oklahoma
- Founded: 1907
- Named for: Creek Nation
- Seat: Sapulpa
- Largest city: Sapulpa

Area
  - Total: 970 sq mi (2,500 km^{2})
  - Land: 950 sq mi (2,500 km^{2})
  - Water: 20 sq mi (52 km^{2}) 2.0%

Population (2020)
  - Total: 71,754
  - Estimate (2025): 74,967 ▲
  - Density: 76/sq mi (29/km^{2})
- Time zone: UTC−6 (Central)
  - Summer (DST): UTC−5 (CDT)
- Congressional districts: 1st, 3rd
- Website: www.creekcountyonline.com

Creek County is a county located in the U.S. state of Oklahoma. As of the 2020 census, the population was 71,754. Its county seat is Sapulpa.

Creek County is part of the Tulsa Metropolitan Area.

== History ==
European explorers traveled through this area early in the 19th century, after the Louisiana Purchase. In 1825, the Osage Nation ceded the territory where the Federal Government planned to resettle the Creek Nation and other tribes after their expulsion from the Southeastern part of the United States. The Creeks began migrating into this area, where they and many black families settled to begin farming and raising cattle. In 1835, Federal soldiers under Captain J. L. Dawson built the Dawson Road, following an old Osage hunting trail.

Railroads gave an important boost to the local economy. In 1886, the Atlantic and Pacific Railroad built a line from Red Fork to Sapulpa. In 1898, the St. Louis and Oklahoma City Railway Company (later the St. Louis–San Francisco Railway), connected Sapulpa and Oklahoma City.

Bristow was originally designated by the statehood constitutional convention as the county seat for Moman County-- later Creek County-- prior to statehood; but, the convention later designated Sapulpa, with the proviso that an election could be held after statehood. The county held such an election on August 20, 1908, amidst arguments that Bristow was more centrally located, but Sapulpa was the center of population in the county. Sapulpa won, setting off a multi-year cycle of petitions, court challenges and new elections. After yet another election, the Oklahoma Supreme Court conclusively ruled in favor of Sapulpa on August 1, 1913.

After oil was discovered at Glenn Pool in adjacent Tulsa County in 1905, other strikes occurred in Creek County. The Cushing-Drumright Oil Field opened in 1912, creating boom towns Drumright, Kiefer and Oilton. By 1920, the county population had increased to 62,480.

== Geography ==
According to the U.S. Census Bureau, the county has a total area of 970 square miles (2,500 km^{2}), of which 950 square miles (2,500 km^{2}) is land and 20 square miles (52 km^{2}) (2.0%) is water. It is drained by the Cimarron River, and the Deep Fork and Little Deep Fork of the North Canadian River. Heyburn Lake is contained within the county. Keystone Lake is partially within Creek County.

=== Major highways ===
- I-44
- US 75 Alt.
- SH-16
- SH-33
- SH-48
- SH-51
- SH-66
- SH-67
- SH-99
- SH-117
- Creek Turnpike

=== Adjacent counties ===
- Pawnee County (north)
- Tulsa County (east)
- Okmulgee County (southeast)
- Okfuskee County (south)
- Lincoln County (west)
- Payne County (northwest)

== Demographics ==
Creek County Fairgrounds, advertising the upcoming Creek County Fair, as seen in August of 2026

Historical population
Census	Pop.	Note	%±
1910	26,223		—
1920	62,480		138.3%
1930	64,115		2.6%
1940	55,503		−13.4%
1950	43,143		−22.3%
1960	40,495		−6.1%
1970	45,532		12.4%
1980	59,016		29.6%
1990	60,915		3.2%
2000	67,317		10.5%
2010	69,967		3.9%
2020	71,754		2.6%
2025 (est.)	74,967	▲	4.5%
U.S. Decennial Census; 1790-1960 1900-1990; 1990-2000 2010

=== 2020 census ===
As of the 2020 United States census, the county had a population of 71,754. Of the residents, 23.5% were under the age of 18 and 19.1% were 65 years of age or older; the median age was 40.9 years. For every 100 females there were 98.2 males, and for every 100 females age 18 and over there were 96.2 males.

The racial makeup of the county was 73.1% White, 2.1% Black or African American, 10.0% American Indian and Alaska Native, 0.4% Asian, 1.7% from some other race, and 12.6% from two or more races. Hispanic or Latino residents of any race comprised 4.8% of the population.

There were 27,662 households in the county, of which 31.3% had children under the age of 18 living with them and 24.3% had a female householder with no spouse or partner present. About 25.3% of all households were made up of individuals and 12.1% had someone living alone who was 65 years of age or older.

There were 31,053 housing units, of which 10.9% were vacant. Among occupied housing units, 74.0% were owner-occupied and 26.0% were renter-occupied. The homeowner vacancy rate was 1.6% and the rental vacancy rate was 9.4%.

=== 2000 census ===
As of the census of 2000, there were 67,367 people, 25,289 households, and 19,017 families residing in the county. The population density was 70 inhabitants per square mile (27/km^{2}). There were 27,986 housing units at an average density of 29 units per square mile (11 units/km^{2}). The racial makeup of the county was 82.27% White, 2.56% Black or African American, 9.08% Native American, 0.27% Asian, 0.03% Pacific Islander, 0.63% from other races, and 5.16% from two or more races; 1.90% of the population were Hispanic or Latino of any race.

As of 2000, there were 25,289 households, out of which 34.80% had children under the age of 18 living with them, 60.10% were married couples living together, 10.90% had a female householder with no husband present, and 24.80% were non-families. 21.60% of all households were made up of individuals, and 9.40% had someone living alone who was 65 years of age or older. The average household size was 2.64 and the average family size was 3.06. In the county, the population was spread out, with 27.40% under the age of 18, 8.00% from 18 to 24, 27.30% from 25 to 44, 24.50% from 45 to 64, and 12.80% who were 65 years of age or older. The median age was 37 years. For every 100 females, there were 96.00 males. For every 100 females age 18 and over, there were 92.90 males.

As of 2000, the median income for a household in the county was $33,168, and the median income for a family was $38,470. Males had a median income of $31,190 versus $21,690 for females. The per capita income for the county was $16,191. About 8% of families and 13.50% of the population were below the poverty line, including 17.20% of those under age 18 and 14.10% of those age 65 or over. By 2021 census estimates, its median household income was $56,384.

== Politics ==
Voter Registration and Party Enrollment as of June 30, 2023
Party	Number of Voters	Percentage
Democratic	9,080	21.43%
Republican	28,106	66.35%
Others	7,176	16.94%
Total	42,362	100%

=== Political culture ===
United States presidential election results for Creek County, Oklahoma
Year	Republican		Democratic		Third party(ies)	
Year	No.	%	No.	%	No.	%
1908	1,761	50.09%	1,413	40.19%	342	9.73%
1912	1,902	41.54%	1,681	36.71%	996	21.75%
1916	2,820	36.92%	3,496	45.77%	1,323	17.32%
1920	7,948	56.88%	5,408	38.70%	618	4.42%
1924	8,894	50.21%	7,969	44.99%	851	4.80%
1928	12,254	67.92%	5,693	31.55%	95	0.53%
1932	6,786	34.36%	12,963	65.64%	0	0.00%
1936	7,257	36.46%	12,540	63.01%	106	0.53%
1940	9,468	46.20%	10,976	53.55%	51	0.25%
1944	7,549	47.38%	8,342	52.36%	41	0.26%
1948	6,532	41.53%	9,198	58.47%	0	0.00%
1952	9,257	51.21%	8,818	48.79%	0	0.00%
1956	8,295	53.87%	7,102	46.13%	0	0.00%
1960	8,785	58.61%	6,205	41.39%	0	0.00%
1964	6,355	39.25%	9,836	60.75%	0	0.00%
1968	6,934	43.34%	5,151	32.20%	3,913	24.46%
1972	12,396	75.11%	3,705	22.45%	402	2.44%
1976	8,458	48.08%	8,964	50.96%	169	0.96%
1980	11,749	59.55%	7,339	37.20%	641	3.25%
1984	15,011	66.34%	7,465	32.99%	152	0.67%
1988	11,308	53.89%	9,512	45.33%	162	0.77%
1992	10,055	39.84%	9,118	36.13%	6,065	24.03%
1996	9,861	43.91%	9,674	43.08%	2,922	13.01%
2000	13,580	57.20%	9,753	41.08%	408	1.72%
2004	18,848	65.50%	9,929	34.50%	0	0.00%
2008	20,187	70.82%	8,318	29.18%	0	0.00%
2012	18,986	72.70%	7,128	27.30%	0	0.00%
2016	21,575	74.84%	5,841	20.26%	1,414	4.90%
2020	23,294	76.36%	6,577	21.56%	634	2.08%
2024	24,098	76.96%	6,643	21.22%	571	1.82%

== Communities ==
=== Cities ===
- Bristow
- Drumright (partly in Payne County)
- Mannford
- Oilton
- Sapulpa (county seat) (partly in Tulsa County)

=== Towns ===
- Depew
- Kellyville
- Kiefer
- Lawrence Creek
- Mounds
- Shamrock
- Slick

=== Census-designated place ===
- Milfay
- Oakhurst (partly in Tulsa County)
- Olive

=== Other unincorporated communities ===
- Bowden
- Gypsy
- Hilton
- Silver City

=== Townships ===
Creek County historically had civil townships. These civil township boundaries (and their names) were still used by the United States Census for counting purposes up to and including the 1960 census.

== Education ==
K-12 school districts include:

- Bristow Public Schools
- Cleveland Public Schools
- Depew Public Schools
- Drumright Public Schools
- Jenks Public Schools
- Kellyville Public Schools
- Kiefer Public Schools
- Mannford Public Schools
- Mounds Public Schools
- Oilton Public Schools
- Olive Public Schools
- Paden Public Schools
- Sapulpa Public Schools
- Tulsa Public Schools

Elementary school districts include:

- Allen-Bowden Public School
- Gypsy Public School
- Jennings Public School
- Keystone Public School
- Lone Star Public School
- Pretty Water Public School
