= Frankoma Pottery =

American pottery company

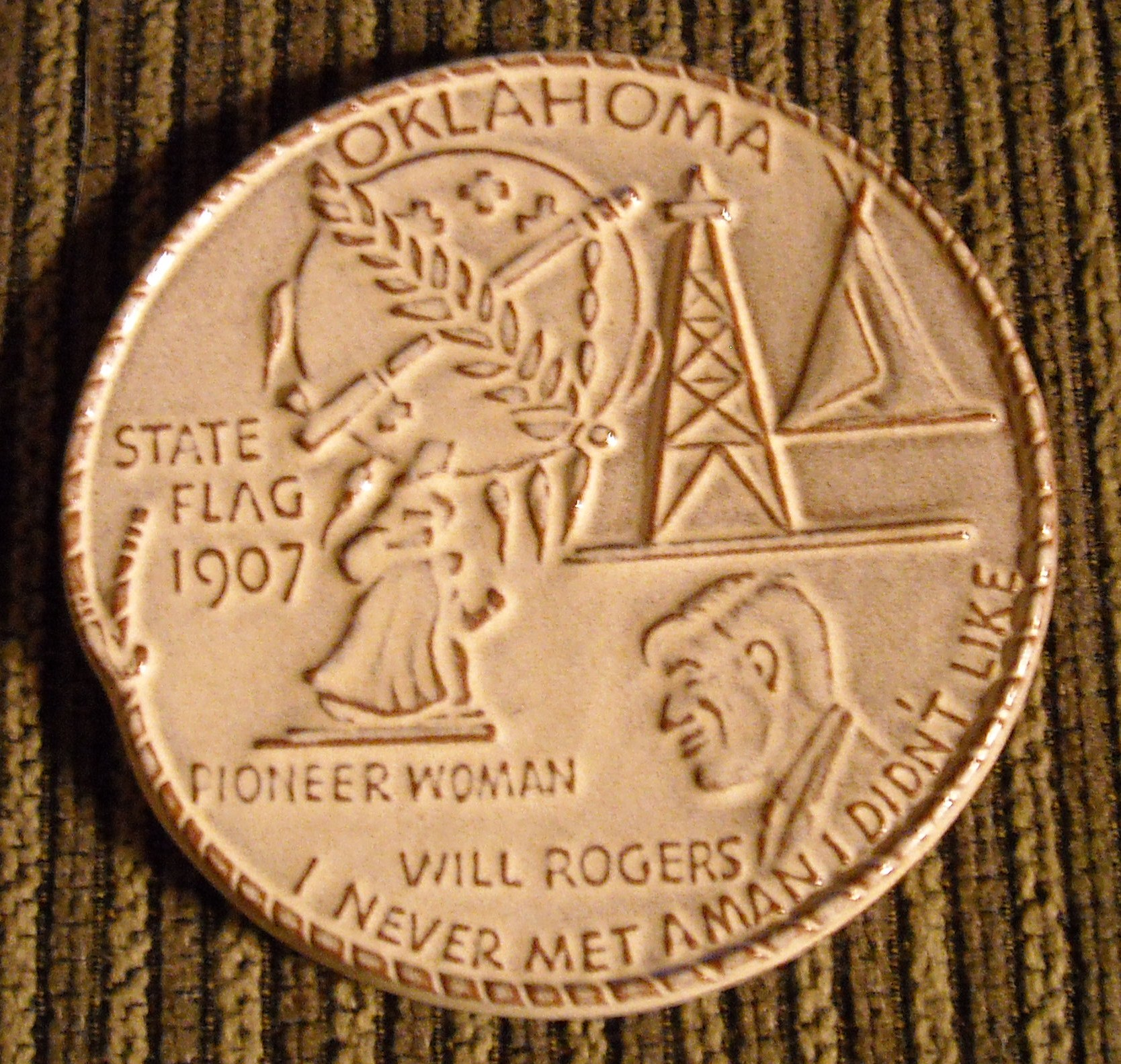
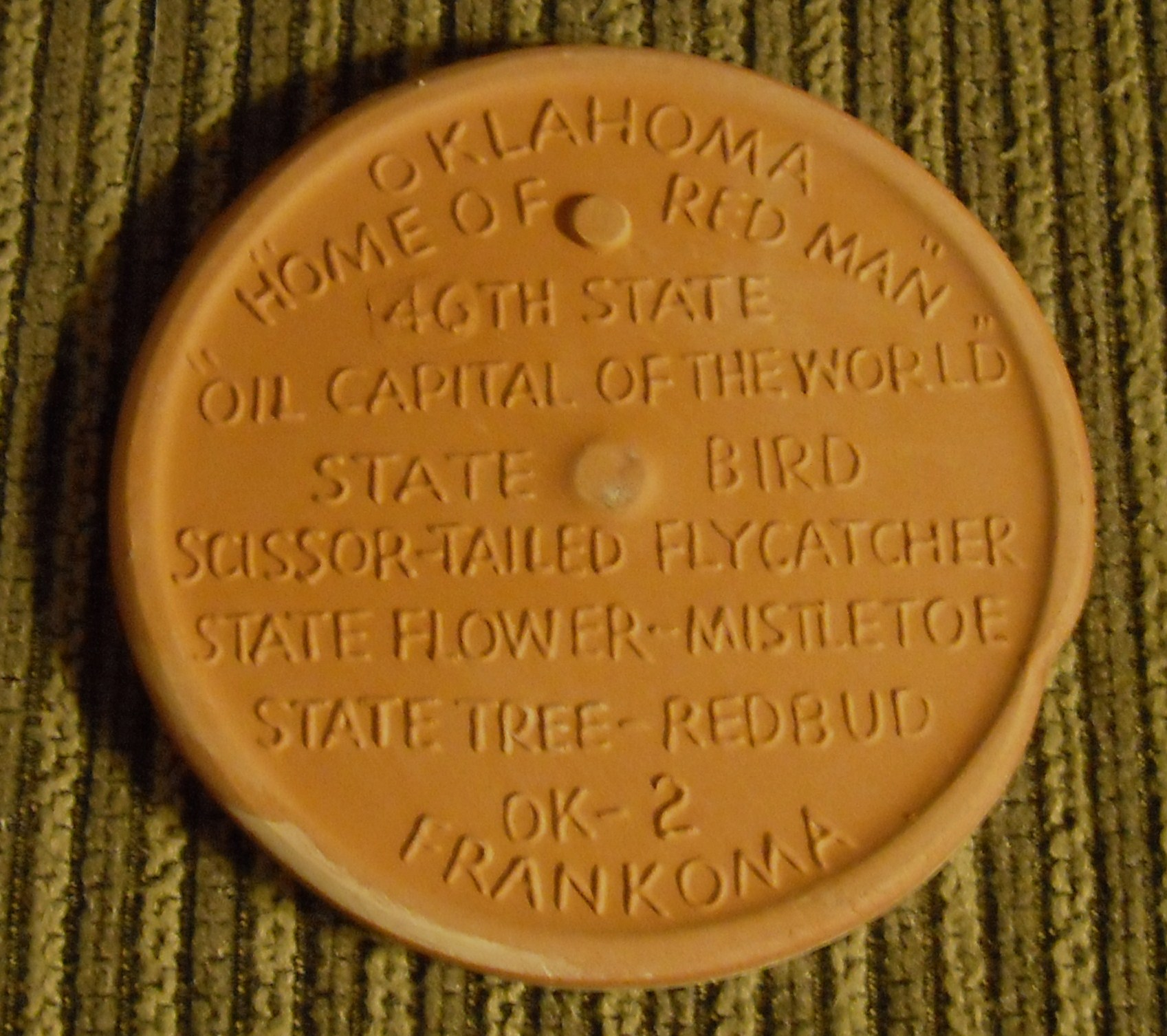
Front and back of a piece of Frankoma pottery.

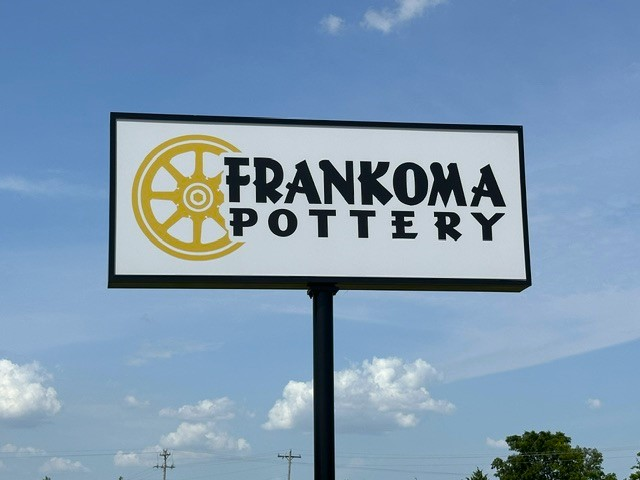
Frankoma Sign at the Glenpool location, July of 2026

Frankoma Pottery is an American pottery company located in Glenpool, Oklahoma, but originally based in Sapulpa, Oklahoma. The company is known for its sculptures and dinnerware, although it also produced many other products, including figurines, trivets, and vases. All Frankoma pottery is made in the US from locally excavated clay.

== History ==
Frankoma was founded in 1933 in Norman, Oklahoma, by John Frank, who was a professor of ceramics at the University of Oklahoma from 1927 to 1936. The name Frankoma was derived from "Frank" plus the last three letters of "Oklahoma". Frank moved the company to Sapulpa in 1938, but rebuilt the factory later that year after a fire.

Frankoma used light-hued local Ada clay in its early products which was replaced by a Sapulpa OK based brick-red local clay in 1953. John Frank operated the pottery with his wife, Grace Lee Frank, until his death in 1973; Grace designed a second line, called Gracetone for the firm. The factory was rebuilt in 1984 after a fire in September 1983 destroyed most of the facility. The company filed for Chapter 11 bankruptcy protection in 1990. The Frank's daughter, Joniece, ran the pottery until 1991, when she was forced to sell the struggling company. The buyer, Richard Bernstein of Maryland, resold the business in 2005 to Det Merryman.

The company was closed for six weeks and then sold again in the summer of 2008, reopening on August 18 under new owner Joe Ragosta. Ragosta planned to rehire all the employees and continue the Frankoma line of pottery. The year 2008 marked the company's 75th anniversary.

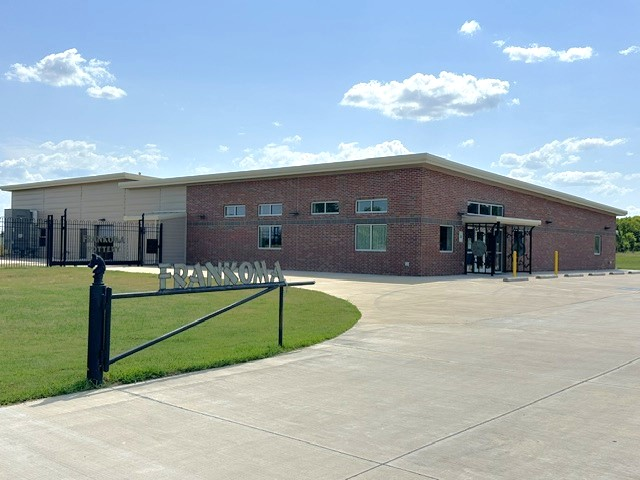
The Frankoma facility in Glenpool, July of 2026

The company closed in 2010 and was auctioned on May 18, 2011, selling over a thousand pieces of pottery, showroom fixtures and equipment. The 1,800 original molds and the Frankoma name were not included in the sale, nor was the real estate. In August 2012, the factory building was sold to a non-pottery manufacturer and the original Frankoma molds and trademark name were sold to FPC LLC. As of April 2020, pottery was still being produced, albeit in lower volume, with a focus on artware.

The 2012 exhibition, Oklahoma Clay: Frankoma Pottery, documented Oklahoma culture through pottery; it took place at the Fred Jones Jr. Museum of Art.

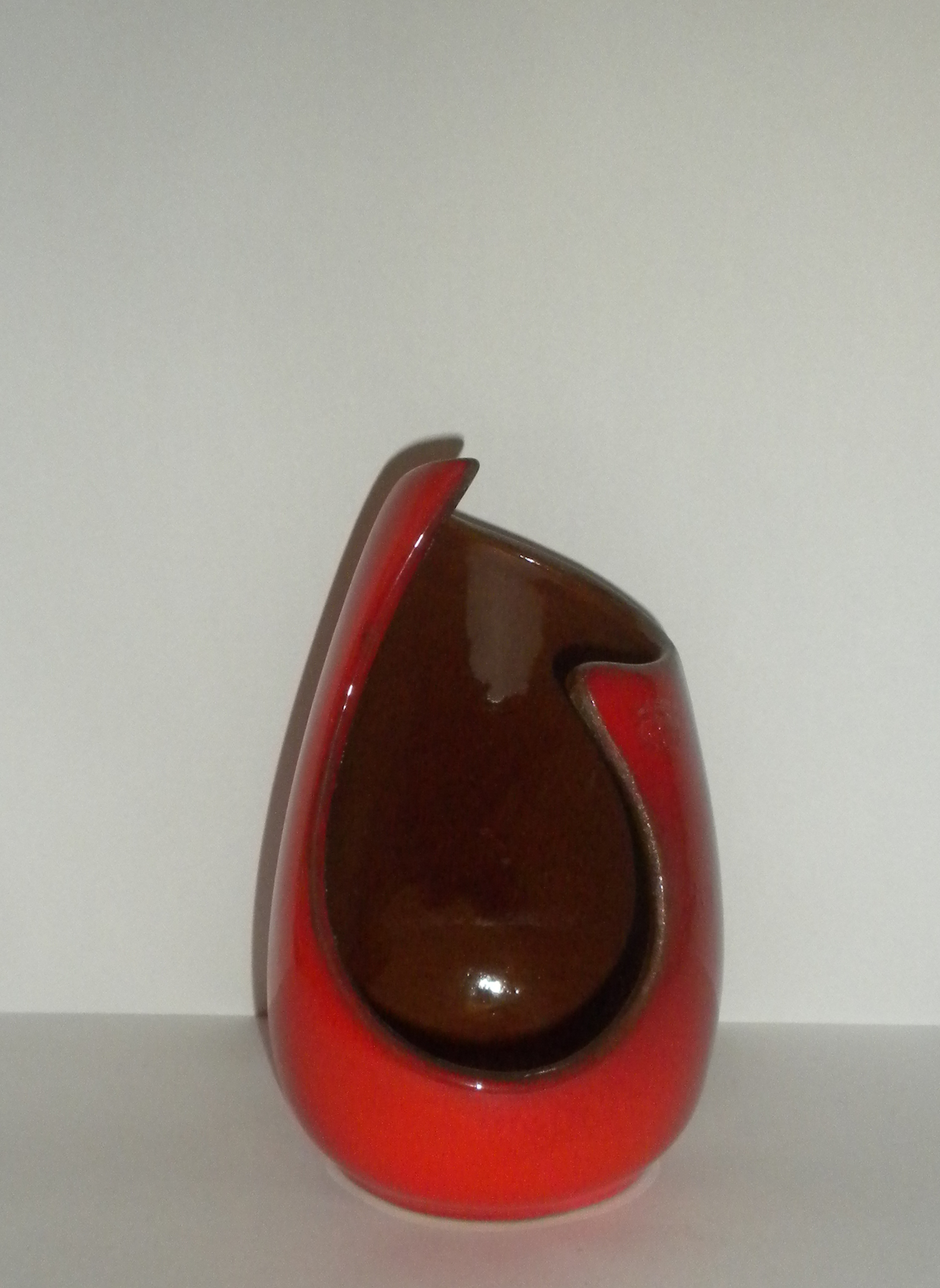
Frankoma mid-century modern vase in red glaze.

In November 2022, Frankoma opened a new manufacturing site and storefront in Glenpool, Oklahoma. Owner Dennis Glascock constructed the facility in hopes of exposing more people to the company's products and revitalizing the program.

== See also ==
- Tamac Pottery
