= Robert Galbreath Jr. =

American entrepreneur and oilman (1863–1953)

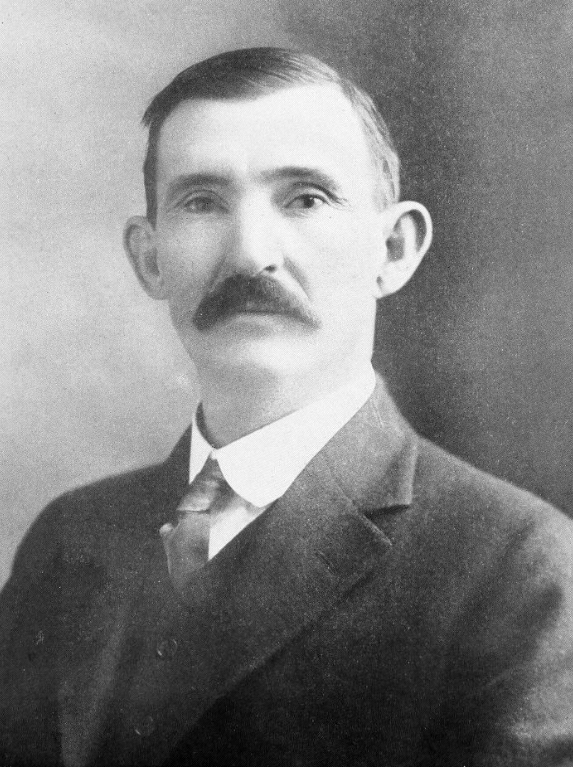
- Born: December 23, 1863; Pickaway County, Ohio
- Died: December 12, 1953 (aged 89); Tulsa, Oklahoma
- Occupation(s): Entrepreneur, wildcatter, oilman
- Spouse: Mary Ellen Kivlehen (m. 1892)

Robert Galbreath Jr. (1863–1953) was an American pioneer entrepreneur, wildcatter, and oilman in Oklahoma. A native of Ohio, he traveled to Kansas and California in the late 19th century. Returning east by way of the Indian Territory, he participated with his brother, Herman, in the Land Rush of 1889 for the unassigned lands. Afterward, he sold his claim and settled in the new town of Edmond. He became an early wildcatter and oil producer. His most notable accomplishment was the discovery of the Glenn Pool oilfield.

== Early life ==
Robert Galbreath Jr. was born to Robert and Sarah A. (née Hill) Galbreath on a farm in Pickaway County, Ohio, on December 23, 1863. He evidently lived there until he decided to go to Kansas in 1884, where he met with David L. Payne. Payne later achieved notability as leader of the Boomers (Oklahoma settlers) in Indian Territory. However, Galbreath did not join the movement, but traveled on to California in 1889. He apparently did not find what he was seeking, because he returned to Indian Territory in 1889. Robert was joined by his younger brother, Herman. They entered the 1889 Land Rush for the Unassigned Lands. The pair claimed land near the present town of Hennessey. They soon sold the claim and moved to Edmond, where Robert served as town marshal and then deputy U.S. marshal.

== Settling in Indian Territory ==
Robert held a variety of jobs after arriving in Edmond, including serving as postmaster and starting a newspaper. In 1892, he married Mary Ellen Kivlehen. Robert participated in the 1893 Cherokee Outlet. Following that experience, he moved his family to Perry, where he published the Perry Evening Democrat. In 1895, he was appointed as a United States commissioner headquartered in Shawnee. (At this time, to have a case for federal court, a commissioner would decide if enough evidence existed). In 1899, Galbreath moved to Oklahoma City to open a real-estate business. There, he formed a business partnership with Charles Colcord.

== Wildcatting ==
Galbreath's career in the oil business began when Colcord and he became partners with Charles "Gristmill" Jones to drill a wildcat well in the newly discovered Red Fork field near Tulsa. The well became a successful producer, providing Galbreath with enough money to continue wildcatting. He then partnered with Frank Chesley and bought a lease on a farm that belonged to Ida E. Glenn and her husband Robert. Ida was a mixed-blood Creek Indian, while Robert was White. She had received the land by allotment. Galbreath reportedly paid about three cents per acre for the lease. Galbreath named the well "Ida Glenn No. 1." The two men operated the drilling rig themselves. On November 22, 1905, it produced a gusher and initiated a major oil boom in the area. The gusher was the first strike in a very large field that Galbreath named Glenn Pool. It became the state's largest oil field.

Galbreath moved to Tulsa to continue his activities in the oil fields. Galbreath continued to drill two more producing wells in the Glenn Pool field. Together, these three wells earned him the names "Oil King of the Southwest" and "the richest man in Oklahoma." In 1907, he drilled the first producing well in the Bald Hill Field in Okmulgee County. In 1909, he sold his Glenn Pool holdings to J. E. Crosbie and turned his attention to politics. He defeated W. Tate Brady in the 1912 election for national committeeman of the Democratic Party.

== Other business interests ==
His other business interests included building the three-story Galbreath Hotel in the town of Bromide, where he intended to develop a health spa based on the local mineral water. The Great Depression caused the idea to fail. He also attempted to mine iron and manganese in southeastern Oklahoma.

== Family ==
Robert and Mary Ellen had three children: Robert, Leona, George Francis.

== Death ==
Galbreath died on December 12, 1953, in Tulsa, Oklahoma.
