= Glenpool, Oklahoma =

- City
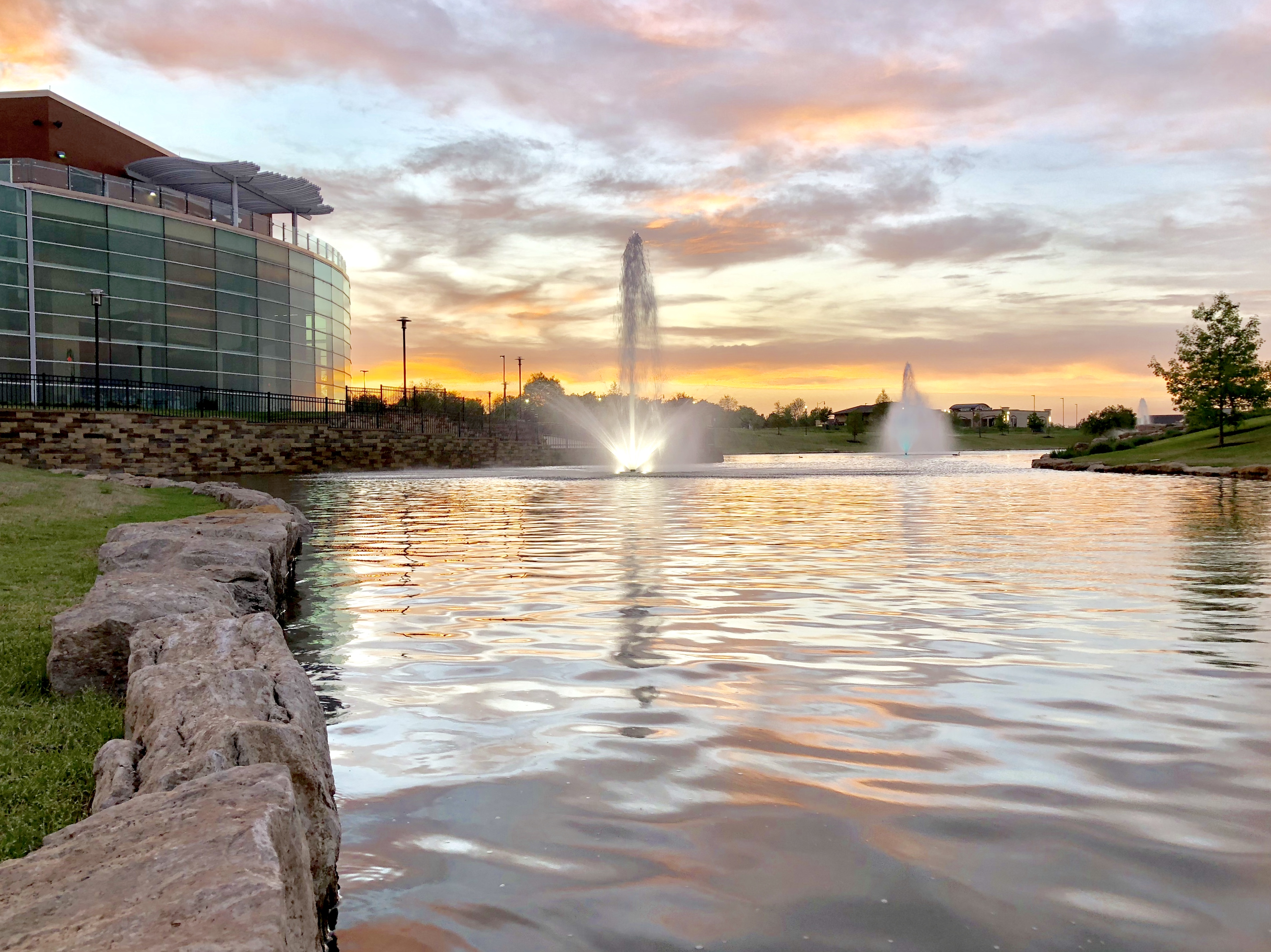
- The Glenpool Conference Center
- Motto: "Creating Opportunity"
- Location of within Tulsa County, and the state of Oklahoma

- Location in the United States Glenpool, Oklahoma (the United States)
- Coordinates: 35°56′58″N 96°0′8″W
- Country: United States
- State: Oklahoma
- County: Tulsa
- Established: 1906

Government
  - Type: Mayor-Council
  - Mayor: Joyce Calvert

Area
  - Total: 11.03 sq mi (28.58 km^{2})
  - Land: 11.03 sq mi (28.58 km^{2})
  - Water: 0 sq mi (0.00 km^{2})
- Elevation: 705 ft (215 m)

Population (2020)
  - Total: 13,691
  - Density: 1,240/sq mi (479/km^{2})
- Time zone: UTC-6 (Central (CST))
  - Summer (DST): UTC-5 (CDT)
- ZIP code: 74033
- Area codes: 539/918
- FIPS code: 40-29600
- GNIS feature ID: 1102843
- Website: www.glenpoolonline.com

Glenpool is a city in Tulsa County, Oklahoma, United States. It is part of the Tulsa Metropolitan Statistical Area (TMSA). As of 2020, the population was 14,040, which represented an increase of 29.9% since the 2010 census, which reported the total population as 10,808.

Glenpool is notable because the discovery of oil in 1905, which caused an economic boom that propelled the growth of Tulsa and its surroundings. Although the Glenn Pool Oil Reserve, for which the city was named, still produces a small amount of oil; the city is now primarily a commuter town for Tulsa.

== History ==
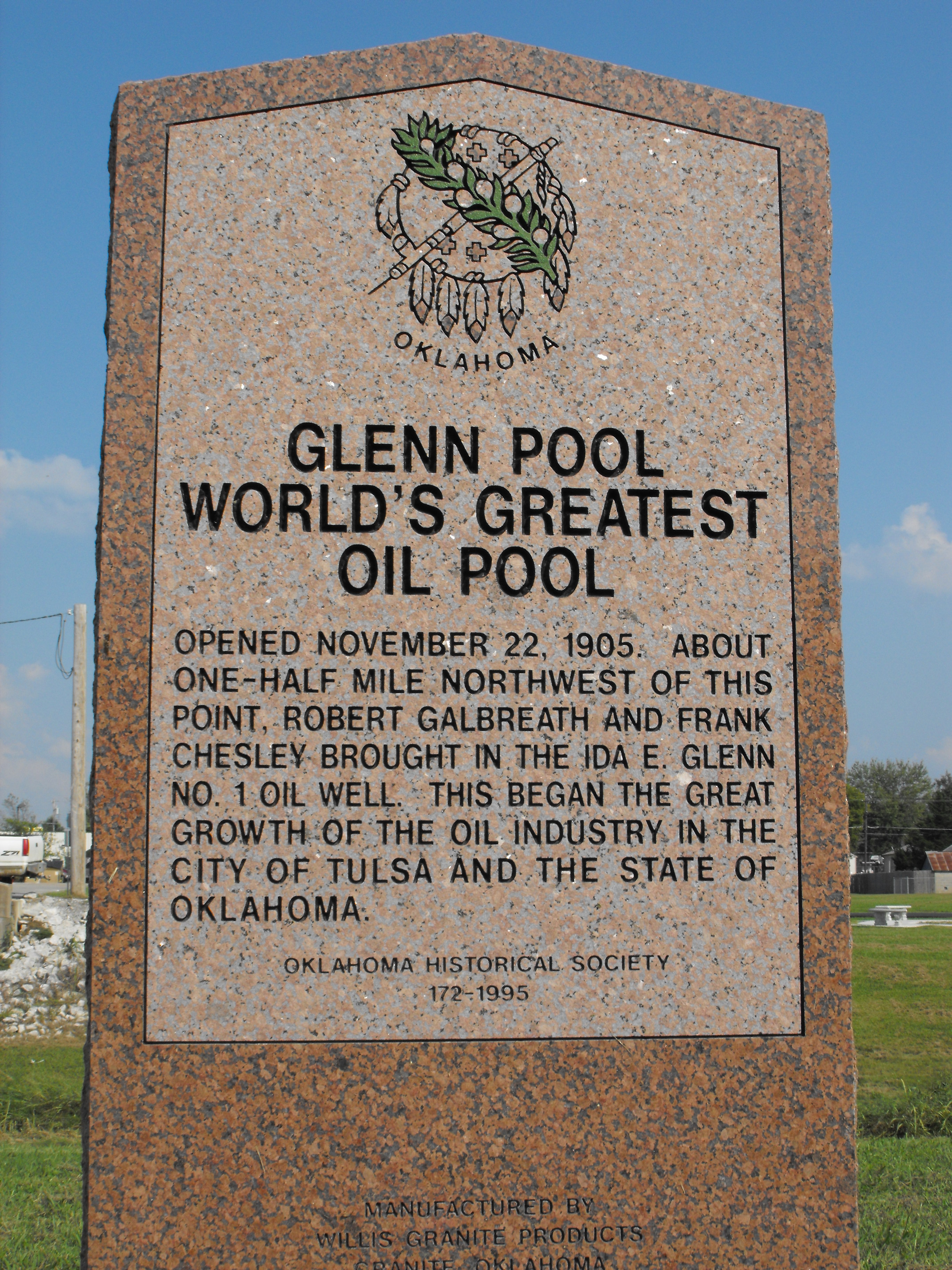
Historical marker in Glenpool, Oklahoma noting the Glenn Pool oil discovery in 1905

On November 22, 1905, wildcatters, Robert Galbreath Jr. and Frank Chesley (along with, by some accounts, Charles Colcord), drilling for oil on farmland owned by Creek Indian Ida E. Glenn, created the first oil gusher in what would soon be known as the "Glenn Pool". The discovery set off a boom of growth for the area, bringing in hordes of people: lease buyers, producers, millionaires, laborers, tool suppliers, drunks, swindlers, and newspeople. Daily production soon exceeded 120,000 barrels (19,000 m^{3}). The nearby city of Tulsa benefited from the production, and Glenpool calls itself the town that made Tulsa famous.

By the end of 1906 a settlement consisting of twelve families had grown up nearby. In that year, the Midland Valley Railroad extended a track from Jenks. By 1907, nearly 3,000 people had moved to the area, but only about 500 people actually lived in the town in 1910. Lots were platted and a post office opened on January 31, 1908. The new community was named "Glenn Pool." The city was incorporated in 1917 but did not appear on state maps until 1924, which is when its name was changed to "Glenpool".

Sometime after the discovery, Ida Estella Glenn and her husband, according to US Censuses, moved from their farm, to Tulsa, to Florida, finally settling in California. Ida E Glenn, born June 4, 1881, in Missouri, died on August 18, 1963, at her home at 2774 Studio Drive, Cayucos, California.

In the early days, Glenpool was on the route of the Sapulpa & Interurban Railway (“S&I”) streetcar/interurban line connecting to Tulsa through Kiefer and Sapulpa, as well as south to Mounds; S&I subsequently went through a series of mergers and name changes, with only the Tulsa-to-Sapulpa portion continuing as the Tulsa-Sapulpa Union Railway.

Population grew to 428 in 1920, but declined thereafter to 280 in 1950. A post-WWII building boom then pushed the population upward to 353 in 1960. During the 1970s and 1980s, urban sprawl of the city of Tulsa reached Glenpool, and the town became a bedroom suburb. It has been growing since. By 1970 the population had risen to 770, then to 2,706 in 1980.

An annual celebration called "Black Gold Days" is a three-day, family-friendly event with food, music, arts and crafts, a carnival, and a parade. It commemorates the early years of Glenpool's history.

== Geography ==
Glenpool is located in the northeastern corner of Oklahoma, approximately 15 miles (24 km) south of downtown Tulsa on U.S. Route 75, a major national north–south artery. The city is on the eastern edge of the Cross Timbers ecoregion, between the Great Plains and the foot of the Ozarks.

According to the United States Census Bureau, the city has a total land area of 10.97 square miles (28.4 km^{2}) as of 2020.

=== Climate ===
Glenpool is in Tornado Alley and has a temperate climate of the humid subtropical variety (Köppen Cfa) with a yearly average temperature of 60 °F (16 °C).

=== Glenn Pool Oil Field ===
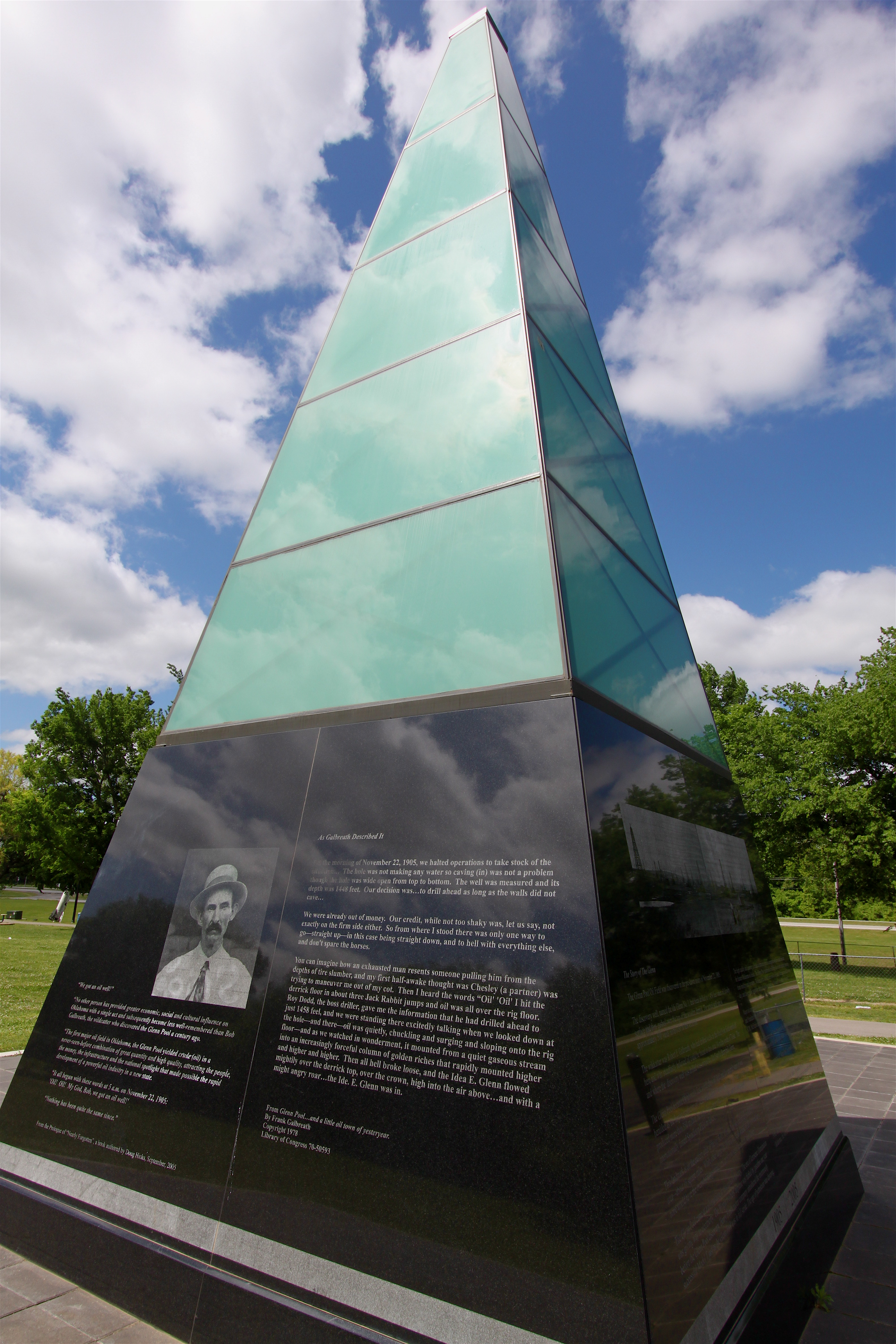
Monument in "Black Gold" Park in Glenpool, Oklahoma.

Edith Durant, who is 18 on July 3, 1917, owns one of the richest oil and gas producers in the famous Glenn Pool in Tulsa county, where the first oil was struck in this country. Lee Hays and Monday Durant, joint guardians, will hand over next July to her a lease for the...company, giving her one-eighth of the production, $100,000 in cash, $50,000 in notes and mortgages and the title to a number of farms in Muskogee county, amounting in all to more than a million dollars.

— Muskogee Times-Democrat
Saturday, May 31, 1917

Galbreath and Chesley had used their own money to pay for an oil drilling rig, with operator, and a lease on Ida Glenn's land. By November 22, 1905, they had drilled through the Red Fork Sand, the deepest known producing sand in the area without striking oil. There was a small stream of natural gas at a depth of 1,450 feet (440 m), so they decided to drill deeper. A few feet further down, the rig encountered a formation known as the Bartlesville Sand, where Chesley noticed the first trace of oil on the drill bit. The well began making a gurgling sound and soon emitted a gusher clear over the derrick. The well soon produced over 75 barrels a day of light, sweet crude oil. Galbreath and Chesley named the well Ida Glenn Number 1. In 1906, Galbreath drilled another well about 300 feet (91 m) from Ida Glenn Number 1. This well was also a producer.

Other people rushed to the area to begin drilling, and soon defined the extent of the field. Prices for leases and for drilling services rose sharply. Fewer than two percent of the wildcat wells failed to produce oil. Some of the Creek landowners began earning as much as a million dollars a year from royalties on the production from their 160-acre plots. According to one source,"... More money was made on the Oklahoma oil boom than the California gold rush and Colorado silver rush combined."

After only one year, the Glenn Pool field had 127 completed wells. Of these, 107 produced oil, 12 found only gas and 11 were dry holes. In addition, 24 more wells were in progress and 33 sites were being readied for drilling. By 1907, the field was increasingly controlled by three companies: Texaco, Gulf Oil Company and Prairie Oil and Gas. Galbreath and Chesley were ready to move on. They sold their Glenn Pool holdings to Edgar Crosbie for $US 500,000 and $US 200,000, respectively.

The Ida Glenn well was plugged and abandoned in 1964. The Glen Pool field still produces a relatively small flow of oil in the 21st century, using waterflood techniques. Over its life span, the field has produced more than 340 million barrels of oil.

== Demographics ==
Historical population
Census	Pop.	Note	%±
1920	428		—
1930	310		−27.6%
1940	284		−8.4%
1950	280		−1.4%
1960	353		26.1%
1970	1,770		401.4%
1980	2,706		52.9%
1990	6,688		147.2%
2000	8,123		21.5%
2010	10,808		33.1%
2020	13,691		26.7%

=== 2020 census ===
As of the 2020 census, Glenpool had a population of 13,691. The median age was 33.4 years. 29.3% of residents were under the age of 18 and 11.0% of residents were 65 years of age or older. For every 100 females there were 93.9 males, and for every 100 females age 18 and over there were 90.2 males age 18 and over.

92.2% of residents lived in urban areas, while 7.8% lived in rural areas.

There were 4,851 households in Glenpool, of which 43.7% had children under the age of 18 living in them. Of all households, 52.2% were married-couple households, 14.1% were households with a male householder and no spouse or partner present, and 26.4% were households with a female householder and no spouse or partner present. About 19.9% of all households were made up of individuals and 7.3% had someone living alone who was 65 years of age or older.

There were 5,062 housing units, of which 4.2% were vacant. Among occupied housing units, 70.2% were owner-occupied and 29.8% were renter-occupied. The homeowner vacancy rate was 0.8% and the rental vacancy rate was 7.7%.

Racial composition as of the 2020 census
Race	Percent
White	59.5%
Black or African American	3.3%
American Indian and Alaska Native	13.2%
Asian	5.9%
Native Hawaiian and Other Pacific Islander	0.1%
Some other race	2.8%
Two or more races	15.2%
Hispanic or Latino (of any race)	7.8%

=== 2010 census ===
As of the 2010 census, there were 10,808 people, 3,723 households, and 2,927 families residing in the city. The population density was 1,045.8 inhabitants per square mile (403.8/km^{2}). There were 2,849 housing units at an average density of 306.4 per square mile (118.3/km^{2}). The racial makeup of the city was 72.6% White, 2.4% African American, 13.2% Native American, 0.9% Asian (0.4% Filipino), 0.1% Pacific Islander, 2.2% from other races, and 8.6% from two or more races. Hispanic or Latino were 5.9% (4.5% Mexican).

There were 3,723 households, out of which 49.7% had children under the age of 18 living with them, 63.2% were married couples living together, 14.3% had a female householder with no husband present, and 18.5% were non-families. 15.7% of all households were made up of individuals, and 3.8% had someone living alone who was 65 years of age or older. The average household size was 2.91 and the average family size was 3.25.

In the city, the population was spread out, with 33.5% under the age of 18, 8.6% from 18 to 24, 35.5% from 25 to 44, 16.8% from 45 to 64, and 5.7% who were 65 years of age or older. The median age was 30 years. For every 100 females, there were 90.3 males. For every 100 females age 18 and over, there were 88.5 males.

The median income for a household in the city was $61,814 and the median income for a family was $66,578. The per capita income for the city was $24,096. Approximately 5.0% of the total population were below the poverty line.

== Education ==
=== High school sports ===
Glenpool High School (GHS) is classified as a 4A school by the OSSAA. Under their former long-time head coach Steve Edwards, Glenpool High School won the Class 4A state football championship in both 2002 and 2008. In 2002, Glenpool High School went 14–0. Glenpool won the 2016 state championship in Track and Field along with having a state champion in cross country.

== Media ==
Glenpool had one newspaper, the Glenpool Post. The paper was published every Wednesday. It was owned by Community Publishers, a newspaper and Internet publisher and commercial printer that served Oklahoma, Missouri, and Arkansas. In 2012, the Glenpool Post was merged with the Jenks Journal and the Bixby Bulletin to form the South County Leader with the news focusing on Glenpool being a component in the newspaper. Ultimately, the South County Leader ceased publication in 2014. The Glenpool Post was started in 1984 by Charles and Susan Biggs and sold to Neighbor Newspapers in 1987.

== See also ==
- History of Oklahoma
- Timeline of Tulsa, Oklahoma
- Oil Capital of the World
- Frankoma Pottery
