= Glenn Pool Oil Reserve =

First large oil reserve found in Oklahoma, US

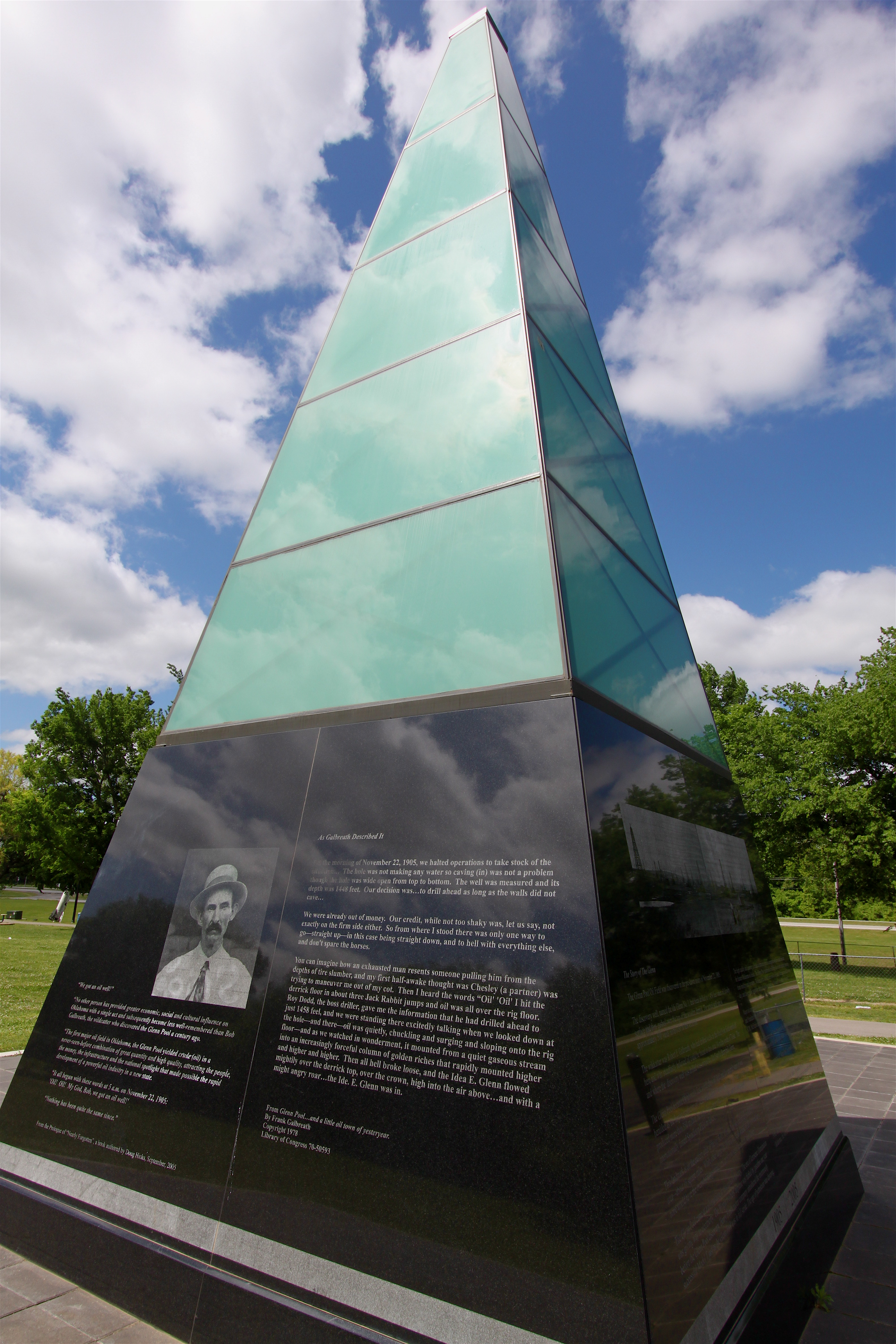
- Monument commemorating the Glenn Pool discovery, Black Gold Park, Glenpool, Oklahoma

- Location within Oklahoma
- Country: US
- Region: Oklahoma
- Location: Tulsa County
- Coordinates: 35°57′42″N 96°00′59″W
- Operators: Oklahoma Natural Gas; Prairie Oil and Gas Company; Gulf Oil Company; Texas Company; others
- Partners: Robert Galbreath and Frank Chesley

Field history
- Discovery: November 22, 1905
- Peak of production: 119,233 barrels per day (~5.941×10^{6} t/a)
- Peak year: 1908
- Abandonment: Nearing depletion

The discovery of the Glenn Pool Oil Reserve in 1905 brought the first major oil pipelines into Oklahoma, and instigated the first large scale oil boom in the state. Located near what was—at the time—the small town of Tulsa, Oklahoma, the resultant establishment of the oil fields in the area contributed greatly to the early growth and success of the city, as Tulsa became the petroleum and transportation center of the state, and the world.

During the boom, several Creek Indian land allotment owners became millionaires; Oklahoma became the world's largest oil producer for years; and the area benefited from the generation of more wealth than the California Gold Rush and Nevada Silver Rush combined, as well as the increased investment capital and industrial infrastructure the boom brought with it. The town of Glenpool, Oklahoma was founded in 1906 as a direct result of the oil reserve's discovery.

== History ==
=== Background ===
Oil speculation was already rampant in the Tulsa region following the Red Fork discovery in 1901. One of the early successes was Galbreath's 125 barrel per day well, northeast of Red Fork. On 3 July 1901, Galbreath camped on the Glenn farm, when Bob Glenn showed Galbreath a limestone outcrop with traces of oil. Further progress awaited federal approval of an oil lease.

At the turn of the 20th century, the federal government dissolved tribal land claims of the Indian Territory in favor the distribution of parcels to private owners. Robert Galbreath, a speculator and wildcatter, began prospecting in the area in 1901, and made an initial agreement that year with the recipient of one of these land allotments, Ida Glenn (a Creek native) and her husband, Robert, to drill for oil on their farmland. Due to federal regulations of the time, however, it would be years before such drilling commenced. Following the change of oil leasing regulations affecting Native American land allotments enacted due to Oklahoma's pending statehood, Galbreath and a partner, Frank Chesley, finally began drilling on the Ida E. Glenn No. 1 drill-site in the autumn of 1905. Roy Dodd and Shorty Miller made up the cable-tool drilling crew.

The well was on the banks of a creek located four[teen] miles south of an unimpressive, small town on the Frisco Railroad and the Arkansas River by the name of Tulsa.

— Norman Hyne, professor of petroleum geology at the University of Tulsa

=== Discovery ===
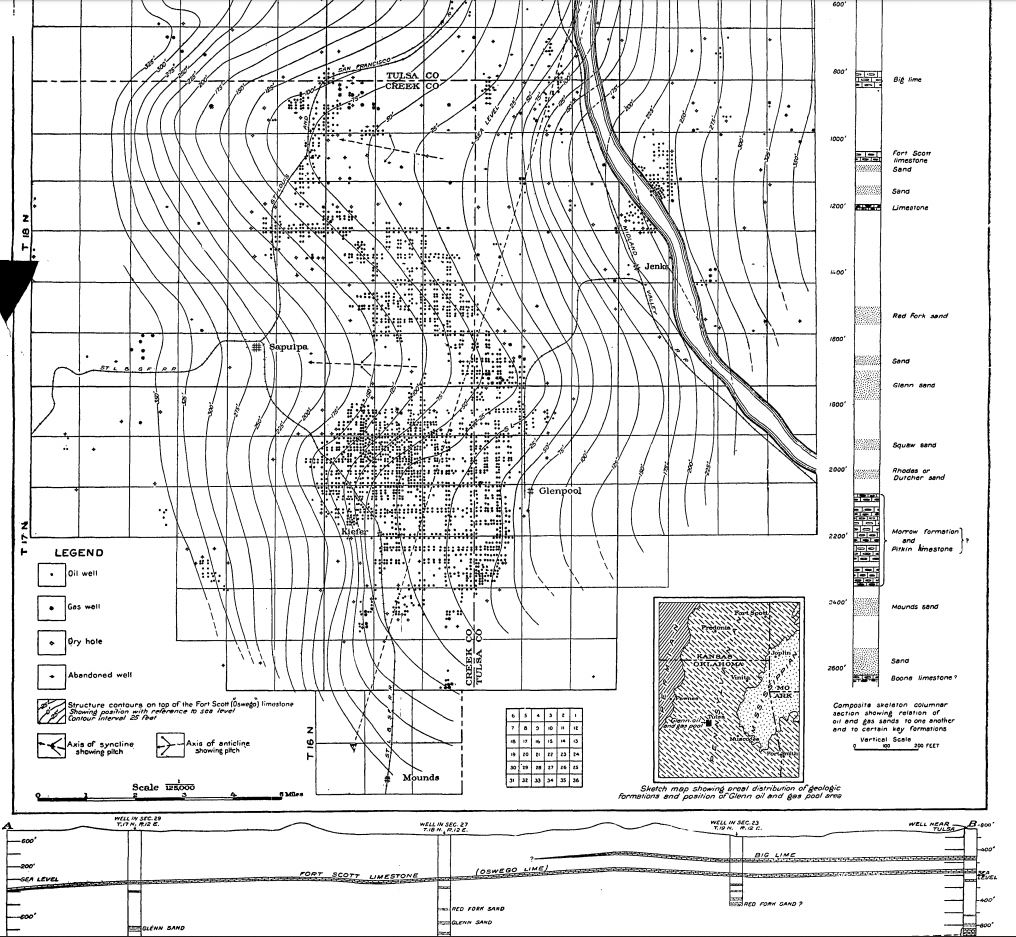
Glenn Pool geological map

After almost giving up and conceding the well to probably be a "dry hole", Galbreath noticed signs of gas flow in early November and continued drilling. Due to the depth they had drilled by mid-November, the success of the well was doubtful. After seeing signs of oil in the well debris, however, the pair were encouraged and, once more, continued on. On November 22, 1905, at 5 AM, with the well deep into the layer of Bartlesville (or "Glenn") sandstone of the Boggy Formation, the two struck oil at a depth of 1,481 ft (451 m).

The oil soon flowed over the top of the derrick, and the "gusher" marked the discovery of Oklahoma's first major oil field. Galbreath, Chesley, Charles Colcord, and John Mitchell then formed the Creek Oil Company, and Chesley soon leased an additional 600 acres. Galbreath went on to drill 69 successful wells, with only one dry hole.

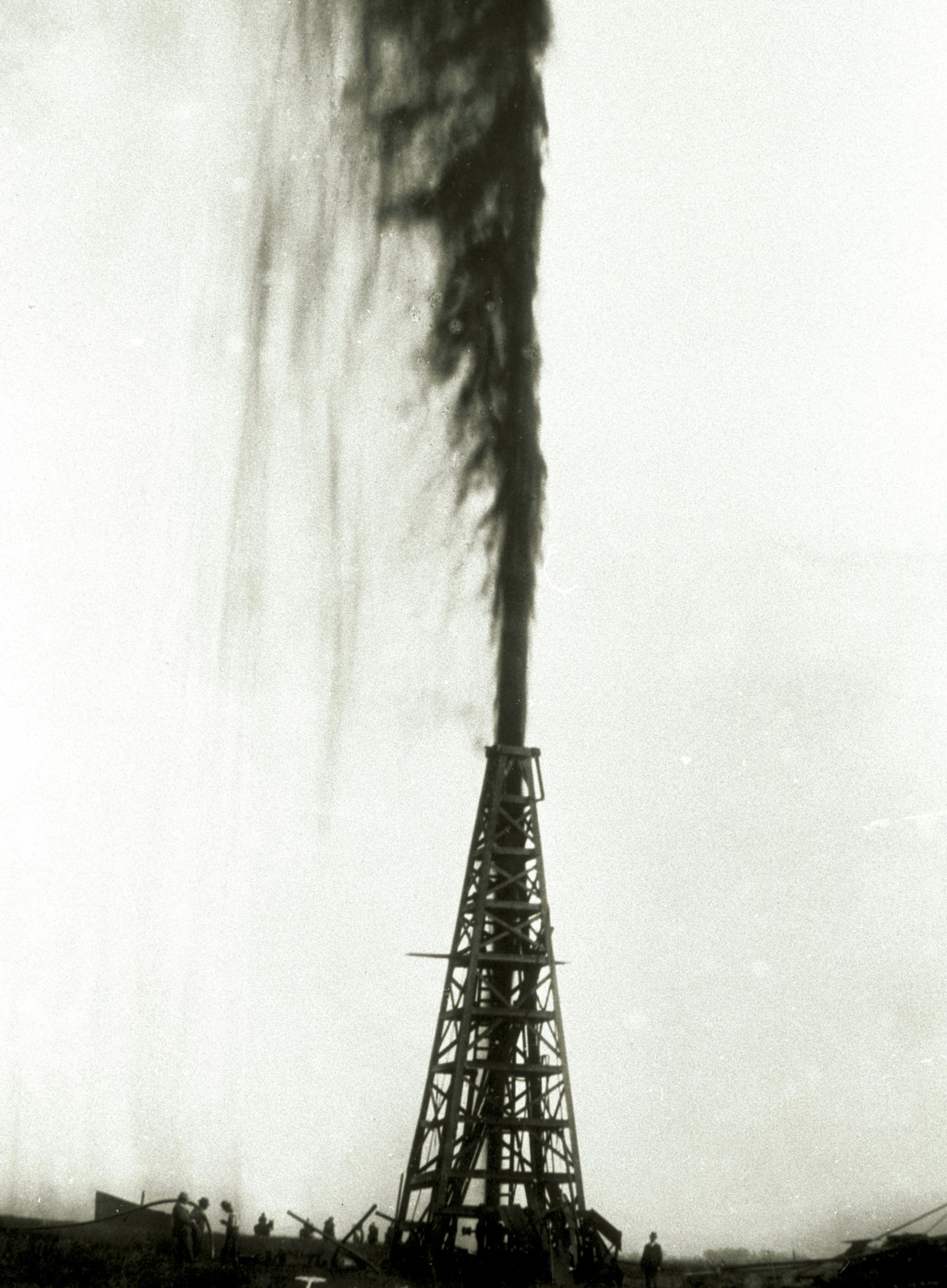
Example of an early 20th-century oil drilling derrick showing an oil strike (or "gusher")

The Ida E. Glenn No. 1 soon regularly produced 75–85 barrels of light, sweet crude oil a day. Gilbreath, a veteran of the earlier Red Fork boom, wished to avoid the chaos which had followed that prior discovery and attempted to keep the drilling and subsequent discovery a secret, but to no avail. Several other speculators operating in the area noticed the activity at the farm. The area was immediately swarmed by oil and land speculators. Within a year, the approximately 12 sq mi (31 km^{2}) Glenn Pool held over 125 oil- or gas-producing wells.

== Characteristics ==
Wildcat drilling took place over a wide area, which had the effect of quickly defining the core layout of the reserve, an area roughly four miles by two miles with a slope of about 40 feet per mile, and an average field thickness of 100 feet. The Glenn Pool Oil Reserve held an estimated 1 billion bbls of oil in place, with ultimate recoverable reserves of 400+ million bbls.

The field grew from 80 acres to 8,000 acres during the first year. By 1907, natural flowing oil production ranged from 18,000,000 barrels (2,900,000 m^{3}) to 20,000,000 barrels (3,200,000 m^{3}) per year. Gas depletion caused by massive venting, however, decreased the gas pressure over the same period and the pumping for oil collection then became necessary. Total field production by 1907 exceeded 43,520,000 barrels (6,919,000 m^{3}), making Oklahoma that year the leading producer of oil, not only in the US, but any country in the world. The area experienced a huge economic boom. Prices for basic goods and services, however, soared in the area.

== Consequences ==
Oil spills, due to a lack of storage facilities, were common early on. Often, open pits were dug and filled with the oil, forming huge "oil lakes" which sometimes escaped their banks and flooded the countryside. During thunderstorms, these "lakes" sometimes caught fire following lightning strikes. Due to this unclean method of storage, the product from the reserve often sold for as little as 25 cents per barrel. Oklahoma Natural Gas, Prairie Oil and Gas Company, Gulf Oil Company, and the Texas Company quickly built large-diameter pipelines into the area which by 1908 alleviated much of the infrastructure problems the rapid boom had caused.

The Oklahoma oil boom created more wealth for speculators than the California gold rush and Colorado silver rush combined. Several of the Creek Nation land allotment owners in the vicinity became rich, almost overnight, and received regular royalty payments of over a million dollars a year following the discovery. One neighbor of the Glenns, Thomas Gilcrease, became a multi-millionaire as a result of the oil production, and had 32 producing wells on his farm by 1917.

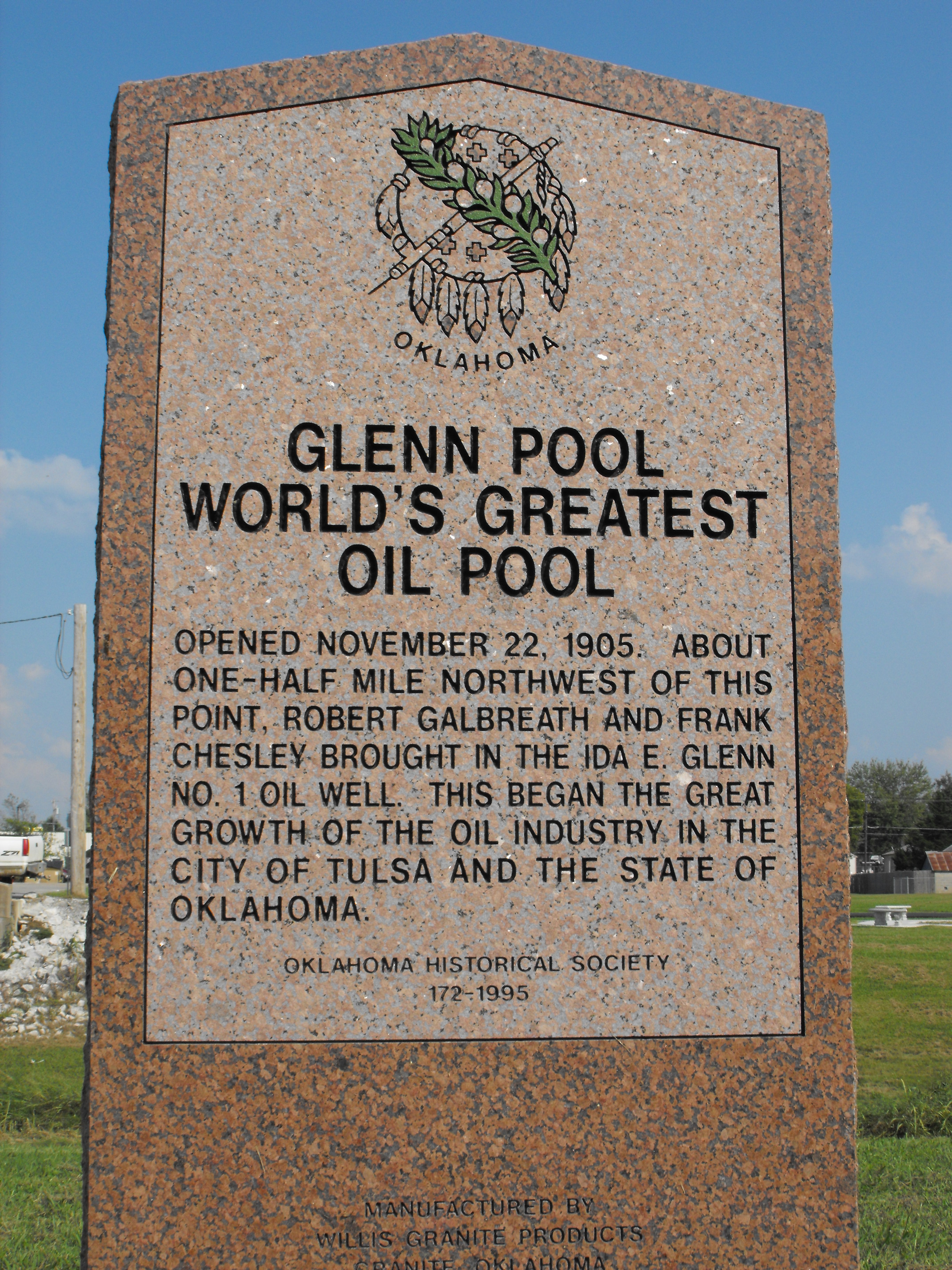
The discovery of oil in the area made the state of Oklahoma the largest oil producer in the world for several decades.

== Aftermath ==
Harry Ford Sinclair (founder of Sinclair Oil and Refining Company) and J. Paul Getty (founder of Getty Oil Company) both got their start during the Glenn Pool boom.

The town of Glenpool, Oklahoma, was founded in 1906 as support for the fledgling oil industry in the area, and had over 500 inhabitants by 1910. Glenpool today calls itself "the town that made Tulsa famous."

The Glenns sold their farm and moved to California. Galbreath bought out Colcord and Mitchell, before Galbreath and Chesley sold their interests to J. Edgar Crosbie. Galbreath then focussed on wildcatting the Bald Hill Field near Haskell, Oklahoma.

The original well, the Ida E. Glenn No. 1, was abandoned and filled in 1964 by Texaco.

== In the 21st century ==
As of 2019, the field has produced more than 340,000,000 barrels (54,000,000 m^{3}) of oil. The Glenn Pool Oil Reserve boundaries have shifted about one mile to the west of the original perimeter. The reserve is still producing flow from legacy wells, although at a significantly lesser volume. Newer tight oil wells, especially since the introduction of "fracking" and "flooding" techniques for oil extraction, continue to regularly produce oil to this day.
