= Oklahoma Tech Prep =

In Oklahoma, Tech Prep is an administered through the Oklahoma Department of Career and Technology Education, located in Stillwater, Oklahoma. Tech Prep is funded through Section II of the Carl D. Perkins Career and Technical Education Act of 2006.

== Tech Prep Background ==
Tech Prep, which began in the early 1980s as a small, locally driven high school improvement strategy, has grown into a major national strategy for improving students' academic knowledge and technical skills. As defined in the Carl D. Perkins Vocational and Technical Education Act (Perkins), Tech Prep is a sequenced program of study that combines at least two years of secondary and two years of postsecondary education. It is designed to help students gain academic knowledge and technical skills, and often earn college credit for their secondary coursework. Programs are intended to lead to an associate degree or a certificate in a specific career field, and ultimately, to high wage, high skill employment or advanced postsecondary training.

Roughly 47% of the nation's high schools (or 7,400 high schools) offer one or more Tech Prep programs. Nearly every community and technical college in the nation participates in a Tech Prep consortium, as do many four-year colleges and universities, private businesses, and employer and union organizations.

Research on the effectiveness of Tech Prep programs is inconclusive. State evaluations in Texas and New York found some evidence that Tech Prep improved students' grade point averages, lowered dropout, reduced absences, increased high school completion, and improved postsecondary enrollment. However, these evaluations did not find evidence that Tech Prep improved students' scores on standardized academic achievement tests, and findings were mixed on whether Tech Prep improved students' postsecondary achievement or labor market outcomes. The last national evaluation of Tech Prep programs, conducted in 1997, found that Tech Prep programs were not always implemented as envisioned in the legislation, perhaps lessening their impact on student outcomes.

These programs support students' transitions to postsecondary education through dual enrollment, access to advanced facilities and labs, and exposure to college life.

== Tech Prep Consortia ==
In Oklahoma, Tech Prep is administered through the OK Department of CareerTech and carried out through local technology centers. The students attend a local CareerTech center which provides career and technology education for high school students in the U.S. state of Oklahoma. The students generally spend part of each day in their respective schools pursuing academic subjects in addition to attending classes in their affiliated technology center. Technology centers are part of the CareerTech System overseen by the OK Department of CareerTech in Stillwater, Oklahoma.

- Central Oklahoma Tech Prep - Gordon Cooper Technology Center, Wes Watkins Technology Center, Green Country Technology Center
- Chisholm Trail Technology Center Consortium - Chisholm Trail Technology Center
- CREATE - Oklahoma City Community College
- Eastern Oklahoma County Consortium - Eastern Oklahoma County Technology Center
- EDUCATE - Caddo-Kiowa Technology Center
- FOCUS - Moore Norman Technology Center
- High Plains Tech Prep Consortium - High Plains Technology Center
- Kiamichi Technology Centers Tech Prep Consortium - Kiamichi Technology Center
- Link Tech Prep Consortium - Mid-America Technology Center
- Meridian Tech Prep Consortium - Meridian Technology Center
- Mid-Del Career Connection - Mid-Del Technology Center
- Northeast Tech Prep Consortium- Northeast Technology Center
- Northwest Oklahoma Tech Prep - Northwest Technology Center
- Pioneer Technology Center Tech Prep - Pioneer Technology Center
- Pontotoc Tech Prep Consortium- Pontotoc Technology Center
- Red River Tech Prep - Red River Technology Center
- Redlands Community College Tech Prep Consortium - Redlands Community College
- SOAR Tech Prep - Metro Technology Center
- Southern OK Tech Prep Consortium - Southern Oklahoma Technology Center
- Southwest OK Tech Prep Consortium - Great Plains Technology Center
- Southwest Tech Prep - Southwest Technology Center
- Three Rivers Tech Prep Partners - Indian Capital Technology Center
- Tri County Technology Center Tech Prep - Tri County Technology Center
- Tulsa Tech Prep - Tulsa Technology Center
- Western Tech Prep Consortium- Western Technology Center
- World Class Graduates - Central Technology Center

== Alliance ==
To fulfil the articulation agreement of the Perkins Legislation Oklahoma uses the Cooperative Alliance Project. In Alliances, colleges and technology centers voluntarily seek approval of all existing cooperative agreements from their respective state agencies. While each technology center establishes a primary partnership with one college, other existing agreements from "secondary" college partners are also honored in the alliance process. Through these alliances, all students (high school and adult) in cooperative CTE programs who meet technical admission requirements are eligible to receive dual college credit as they complete their program's courses. The Cooperative Alliance is a partnership of the Oklahoma Department of Career and Technology Education and the Oklahoma Regents for Higher Education.

=== Alliance Partners ===
- Bacone College
- Cameron University
- Carl Albert State College
- Coffeyville Community College
- Conners State College
- Cowley Community College
- Eastern Oklahoma State College
- Murray State College
- Northeastern Oklahoma College
- Northern Oklahoma College
- Oklahoma City Community College
- Oklahoma Panhandle State University
- Oklahoma Wesleyan College
- Oklahoma State University Institute of Technology
- Oklahoma State University–Oklahoma City
- Redlands Community College
- Rochester Institute of Technology
- Rogers State University
- Rose State College
- Seminole State College
- St. Gregory's University
- Tulsa Community College
- Western Oklahoma State College

== See also ==
- List of school districts in Oklahoma
- List of private schools in Oklahoma
- List of colleges and universities in Oklahoma
