= List of colleges and universities in Oklahoma =

The following is a list of colleges and universities in the U.S. state of Oklahoma.

== Four-year institutions ==
Institution	Location	Control	Carnegie Classification	Enrollment(Fall 2024)	Founded
Cameron University	Lawton	Public	Masters University	3,671 (Fall 2026)	1908
East Central University	Ada	Public	Masters University	3,377	1909
Langston University	Langston	Public	Masters University	1,937	1897
Northeastern State University	Tahlequah	Public	Masters University	6,751	1909
Northwestern Oklahoma State University	Alva	Public	Masters University	2,079	1897
Oklahoma Panhandle State University	Goodwell	Public	Masters University	1,021	1909
Oklahoma State University	Stillwater	Public	Research University	27,278	1890
Oklahoma State University	Tulsa	Public	Research University	(included with main campus)	1999
Oklahoma State University - Center for Health Sciences	Tulsa	Public	Research University	2,256	1972
Rogers State University	Claremore	Public	Baccalaureate / Associates Colleges	3,272	1909
Southeastern Oklahoma State University	Durant	Public	Masters University	5,851	1909
Southwestern Oklahoma State University	Weatherford	Public	Masters University	4,811	1901
University of Central Oklahoma	Edmond	Public	Masters University	12,554	1890
University of Oklahoma	Norman	Public	Research University	30,851	1890
University of Oklahoma Health Sciences Center	Oklahoma City	Public	Research University	3,680	1971
University of Science & Arts of Oklahoma	Chickasha	Public	Baccalaureate / Associates Colleges	1,027	1908
Oklahoma State University Institute of Technology	Okmulgee	Public	Baccalaureate / Associates Colleges	2,396	1946
Mid-America Christian University	Oklahoma City	Private (Not For Profit)	Masters University	2,397	1953
Oklahoma Baptist University	Shawnee	Private (Not For Profit)	Baccalaureate / Associates Colleges	1,569	1910
Oklahoma Christian University	Oklahoma City	Private (Not For Profit)	Masters University	2,851	1950
Oklahoma City University	Oklahoma City	Private (Not For Profit)	Masters University	2,966	1904
Oral Roberts University	Tulsa	Private (Not For Profit)	Masters University	5,936	1963
Randall University	Moore	Private (Not For Profit)	Research University	298	1959
Saint Paul School of Theology	Oklahoma City	Private	Seminary		1958
Southern Nazarene University	Bethany	Private (Not For Profit)	Masters University	2,198	1899
Southwestern Christian University	Bethany	Private (Not For Profit)	Baccalaureate / Associates Colleges	399	1946
University of Tulsa	Tulsa	Private (Not For Profit)	Research University	3,914	1894
Family of Faith Christian University	Shawnee	Private (Not For Profit)	Faith-related Institution	320	1989
Heartland Baptist Bible College	Oklahoma City	Private (Not For Profit)	Unaccredited		1966
Oklahoma Wesleyan University	Bartlesville	Private (Not For Profit)	Baccalaureate / Associates Colleges	880	1905
Phillips Theological Seminary	Tulsa	Private (Not For Profit)	Special Focus Institution	103	1987
Spartan College of Aeronautics and Technology	Tulsa	Private (For Profit)	Technology-related Institution	840	1928

== Tribal colleges ==
- College of the Muscogee Nation – Okmulgee, Oklahoma
- Pawnee Nation College – Pawnee, Oklahoma

== Two-year institutions ==
- Carl Albert State College – Poteau, Oklahoma
- Connors State College – Warner, Oklahoma
- Eastern Oklahoma State College – Wilburton, Oklahoma
- Murray State College – Tishomingo, Oklahoma
- Northeastern Oklahoma A&M College – Miami, Oklahoma
- Northern Oklahoma College – Tonkawa, Oklahoma
- Oklahoma City Community College – Oklahoma City, Oklahoma
- Oklahoma State University - Oklahoma City – Oklahoma City, Oklahoma
- Redlands Community College – El Reno, Oklahoma
- Rose State College – Midwest City, Oklahoma
- Seminole State College – Seminole, Oklahoma
- Tulsa Community College – Tulsa, Oklahoma
- Western Oklahoma State College – Altus, Oklahoma
Location of community colleges in Oklahoma. For colleges with multiple campuses, the flagship campus is labeled. Black dots represent flagship campuses colleges. Red dots represent satellite campuses.

== Defunct colleges and universities ==
Institution	Location	Control	Carnegie Classification	Founded	Closed
American Christian College & Seminary	Oklahoma City	Private (For Profit)	Faith-related Institution	1985	
Bacone College	Muskogee	Private (Not For Profit)	Baccalaureate / Associates Colleges	1880	2025
Cheyenne-Arapaho Tribal College	Weatherford		Tribal college	2006	2015
Comanche Nation College	Lawton		Tribal college	2002	2017
Kingfisher College	Kingfisher	Private	Congregationalist	1895	1922
Oklahoma Presbyterian College	Durant	Private	Presbyterian	1894	
Phillips University	Enid	Private	Christian Church (Disciples of Christ)	1906	1998
St. Gregory's University	Shawnee	Private (Not For Profit)	Baccalaureate / Associates Colleges	1875	2017

== See also ==
- List of college athletic programs in Oklahoma
- List of school districts in Oklahoma
- List of private schools in Oklahoma
- List of CareerTech centers in Oklahoma
- Higher education in the United States
- List of American institutions of higher education
- List of recognized higher education accreditation organizations
- List of colleges and universities
- List of colleges and universities by country
