= Oklahoma CareerTech Hall of Fame =

Education award in Oklahoma, USA

The Oklahoma CareerTech Hall of Fame is an award given to individuals who, through their outstanding professional and personal achievements, have brought honor and distinction to career and technology education in Oklahoma.

The Oklahoma CareerTech Hall of Fame is sponsored by the Oklahoma Foundation for Career and Technology Education. The first members were inducted in 1990; beginning in 1991 the awards were presented biennially in odd-numbered years.

== Members ==
2026

Athena Frank, business information technology instructor, Central Technology Center
Donna Metcalf, former assistant to Dr. Tuttle, skills center instructor, state agency staff
Virginia Sasser, former FHA State Adviser
Billy Scott, former agriculture education instructor
Dr. Fred Shultz, founding superintendent, Meridian Technology Center
Eddie Smith, former State Supervisor Agriculture Education and State FFA Advisor
Ron Vandever, former superintendent, Central Technology Center

2024

Tom Friedemann, retired superintendent, Francis Tuttle Technology Center
Randy Gilbert, long time state board member, former agriculture education instructor and trucking company owner
Velta Reed-Johnson, retired Pioneer Technology Center superintendent, first female technology center superintendent
Denise Morris, retired Oklahoma Family, Career and Community Leaders of America state adviser
Joe Robinson, former teacher, administrator and retired associate state director
Jack Staats, former teacher and retired state program administrator for agricultural education and state FFA adviser

2022

Kent Boggs, retired Oklahoma State FFA Secretary
Carolyn Cotton, retired family and consumer sciences education program specialist
Nancy Randolph Davis, former family and consumer sciences instructor
Bob Funk, co-founder, president and vice chairman of the board of Express Employment Professionals
Phil Waul, retired superintendent, Central Technology Center
Dr. Greg Winters, retired superintendent, Canadian Valley Technology Center

2017

Dr. Belinda Cole, former associate state director for career and support services
Dr. Fern Green-Bowling, retired equity coordinator
Dr. James Strate, retired superintendent, Autry Technology Center
Tom Thomas, retired superintendent, Great Plains Technology Center
Joan Welborn, former owner, CEO and president of ADPC

2015

Phil Berkenbile, former state director, ODCTE
Dean Denton, former business and information technology instructor, Broken Arrow High School
Dale DeWitt, former member of the Oklahoma House of Representatives (District 38) and Agricultural Education Instructor, Braman High School
Bea Paul, former Job Developer, Autry Technology Center and Family and Consumer Science Instructor, Chisholm High School, Enid
Greg Pierce, former superintendent, Pontotoc Technology Center

2013

Harold Anglin, former superintendent and state board member
Frank Coulter, former superintendent of Moore Norman Technology Center
Norman Filtz, retired, ODCTE
Dr. Kay Martin, former superintendent of Francis Tuttle Technology Center
Dwight Stoddard, retired, ODCTE

2011

Henry Bellmon, former Governor of Oklahoma and U.S. senator
Earl Cowan, former superintendent of Canadian Valley Technology Center
Jim E. Hamilton, former state senator and representative
Vince Orza, Ph.D., president and CEO of KSBI, Oklahoma City

2009

Dick Anderson, Retired Executive Vice President AGC of Oklahoma
Brenda Brixey, Retired Family and Consumer Sciences Teacher
Dr. Gene Callahan, Retired Tulsa Technology Center Superintendent
Raymond Cockrum, Retired agricultural education District Supervisor, ODCTE
Clovis Weatherford, Retired Tri County Technology Center Superintendent

2007

Charlotte Edwards, Retired Executive Director of Oklahoma ACTE
Senator Ted V. Fisher, former Oklahoma Senate
Mike Stephens, agricultural education teacher and FFA adviser
Ron Wilkerson, Retired chief communications officer at ODCTE
Elmer L. “Tex” Williamson, Retired student services specialist

2005

RL Beaty, Retired Chief of Staff, ODCTE
Ann Benson, Retired Director, ODCTE
Sam Combs, co-founder the Retired Educators for Agriculture Programs (REAP)
Chuck Hopkins, Retired assistant director, ODCTE
Frosty Troy, Editor of The Oklahoma Observer

2003

Arthur Foster, former community banker
Dr. Clyde Knight, former trade and industrial education professor at Oklahoma State
DeAnn Pence, Retired vocational Family and Consumer Sciences instructor
Dr. J.W. Weatherford, former professor of vocational teacher education at UCO

2001

Gus Friedemann, Retired Distributive Education instructor, Stillwater High School
Ruth Killough, Retired LPN instructor, Mid-Del Technology Center
Roy Peters, Jr, former State Director, ODCTE
Bill Powers, Retired Superintendent, Kiamichi Technology Center
Jean Robertson, Retired Family and Consumer Sciences Instructor, Pryor Junior High
Wes Watkins, retired member of the United States House of Representatives, namesake of Wes Watkins Technology Center

1999

Vic Van Hook, Retired Deputy Director, ODCTE
John Hopper, Retired Superintendent, Central Technology Center
Dale Hughey, Retired, ODCTE
Dr. Joe Lemley, Retired Superintendent, Tulsa Technology Center
Wayne Miller , Retired Director, Oklahoma State University-Okmulgee
Marvin Stokes, Retired Superintendent, Byng Public Schools

1997

Dr. Roy Ayres, former State Supervisor, Trade and Industrial Education
Ted Best , former state adviser, DECA
Dr Bob Brown, Retired professor, Central State University
Dr Willa Combs, Retired professor and chair, Langston University
Dr Coaken Jones, former National New Farmers of America Adviser
Ernest Muncrief, Retired agricultural education instructor, Marlow, Oklahoma

1995

Edna Crow, retired district supervisor, Family and Consumer Sciences
Jess Banks, retired state coordinator of the Employment and Training Division, ODCTE
Bruce Gray, Superintendent, Francis Tuttle Technology Center
Ralph Dressen, Retired agricultural education District Supervisor, ODCTE
Hugh Lacy, former coordinator of Manpower Division, ODCTE
Mary Randall, retired coordinator, Health Occupations, ODCTE

1993

Larry Hansen, retired assistant director, ODCTE
Bill Harrison, retired director, Oklahoma ACTE
Don Ramsey, owner, Blue and Gold Sausage Company
May Rollow, retired state supervisor, Family and Consumer Sciences

1991

Dr. Arch Alexander, deputy director of the Oklahoma Department of Career and Technology Education
MJ DE Benning, former distributive education state supervisor, assistant professor at Oklahoma State University
Dick Fisher, chartered Cushing FFA Chapter
Dr. Lucille Patton, dean of the Special College of Arts and Sciences, Central State University

1990

Dewey Bartlett, former Governor of Oklahoma, instrumental in creation of CareerTech system
Otha Grimes, Polled Hereford industry
Caroline Hughes, appointed to National Advisory Council on Vocational Education
Byrle Killian, Regent, OSU and A&M Colleges, former state supervisor Agriculture Education
George Nigh, former Governor of Oklahoma
J.B. Perky, former director, ODCTE
Robert Price, dean, Department of Agriculture Education, Oklahoma State University
Roy P. Stewart, author of the Country Boy Column in The Daily Oklahoman, colonel in Oklahoma National Guard
Lela O’Toole, former dean College of Home Economics, Oklahoma State University
Francis Tuttle, former ODCTE State Director, namesake of Francis Tuttle Technology Center

== See also ==
- Oklahoma Department of Career and Technology Education
