= Kay Martin (technologist) =

Kay Martin is an American technologist.

She served as the superintendent of the Francis Tuttle Technology Center from 1997 to 2010.

Martin was inducted to the Oklahoma Women's Hall of Fame in 2007.

Martin was named interim director of the Oklahoma Department of Career and Technology Education from Feb. to April 2013.

Martin was inducted into the Oklahoma CareerTech Hall of Fame in the Class of 2013.
