= List of college athletic programs in Oklahoma =

This is a list of college athletic programs in the U.S. state of Oklahoma.

Notes:

- This list is in a tabular format, with columns arranged in the following order, from left to right:
  - Athletic team description (short school name and nickname), with a link to the school's athletic program article if it exists. When only one nickname is listed, it is used for teams of both sexes. (Note that in recent years, many schools have chosen to use the same nickname for men's and women's teams even when the nickname is distinctly masculine.) When two nicknames are given, the first is used for men's teams and the other is used for women's teams. Different nicknames for a specific sport within a school are noted separately below the table.
  - Full name of school.
  - Location of school.
  - Conference of the school (if conference column is left blank, the school is either independent or the conference is unknown).
- Apart from the ongoing conversions, the following notes apply:
  - Following the normal standard of U.S. sports media, the terms "University" and "College" are ignored in alphabetization, unless necessary to distinguish schools (such as Boston College and Boston University) or are actually used by the media in normally describing the school (formerly the case for the College of Charleston, but media now use "Charleston" for that school's athletic program).
  - Schools are also alphabetized by the names they are most commonly referred to by sports media, with non-intuitive examples included in parentheses next to the school name. This means, for example, that campuses bearing the name "University of North Carolina" may variously be found at "C" (Charlotte), "N" (North Carolina, referring to the Chapel Hill campus), and "U" (the Asheville, Greensboro, Pembroke, and Wilmington campuses, all normally referred to as UNC-{campus name}).
  - The prefix "St.", as in "Saint", is alphabetized as if it were spelled out.

== NCAA ==
=== Division I ===
Full NCAA Division I member colleges in Oklahoma.
– FBS Football, – Non-Football

Team	School	City	Conference	Sport sponsorship						
Team	School	City	Conference	Foot- ball	Basketball		Base- ball	Soft- ball	Soccer	
Team	School	City	Conference	Foot- ball	M	W	Base- ball	Soft- ball	M	W
Oklahoma Sooners	University of Oklahoma	Norman	SEC	FBS	Yes	Yes	Yes	Yes	No	Yes
Oklahoma State Cowboys and Cowgirls	Oklahoma State University–Stillwater	Stillwater	Big 12	FBS	Yes	Yes	Yes	Yes	No	Yes
Oral Roberts Golden Eagles	Oral Roberts University	Tulsa	Summit	No	Yes	Yes	Yes	No	Yes	Yes
Tulsa Golden Hurricane	University of Tulsa	Tulsa	The American	FBS	Yes	Yes	No	Yes	Yes	Yes

=== Division II ===
Full NCAA Division II member colleges in Oklahoma.
– Football member, – Non-football member

Team	School	City	Conference	Sport sponsorship						
Team	School	City	Conference	Foot- ball	Basketball		Base- ball	Soft- ball	Soccer	
Team	School	City	Conference	Foot- ball	M	W	Base- ball	Soft- ball	M	W
Cameron Aggies	Cameron University	Lawton	Lone Star	No	Yes	Yes	Yes	Yes	No	No
Central Oklahoma Bronchos	University of Central Oklahoma	Edmond	MIAA	Yes	Yes	Yes	Yes	Yes	No	Yes
East Central Tigers	East Central University	Ada	Great American	Yes	Yes	Yes	Yes	Yes	No	Yes
Northeastern State RiverHawks	Northeastern State University	Tahlequah	MIAA	Yes	Yes	Yes	Yes	Yes	Yes (Note: Northeastern State and Rogers State's men's soccer teams compete in the Great American Conference.)	Yes
Northwestern Oklahoma State Rangers	Northwestern Oklahoma State University	Alva	Great American	Yes	Yes	Yes	Yes	Yes	No	Yes
Oklahoma Baptist Bison	Oklahoma Baptist University	Shawnee	Great American	Yes	Yes	Yes	Yes	Yes	Yes	Yes
Oklahoma Christian Eagles and Lady Eagles	Oklahoma Christian University	Oklahoma City	Lone Star	No	Yes	Yes	Yes	Yes	Yes	Yes
Rogers State Hillcats	Rogers State University	Claremore	MIAA	No	Yes	Yes	Yes	Yes	Yes	Yes
Southeastern Oklahoma State Savage Storm	Southeastern Oklahoma State University	Durant	Great American	Yes	Yes	Yes	Yes	Yes	No	No
Southern Nazarene Crimson Storm	Southern Nazarene University	Bethany	Great American	Yes	Yes	Yes	Yes	Yes	Yes	Yes
Southwestern Oklahoma State Bulldogs	Southwestern Oklahoma State University	Weatherford	Great American	Yes	Yes	Yes	Yes	Yes	No	Yes

== NAIA ==
Full NAIA member colleges in Oklahoma.
– Football member, – Non-football member

Team	School	City	Conference	Sport sponsorship						
Team	School	City	Conference	Foot- ball	Basketball		Base- ball	Soft- ball	Soccer	
Team	School	City	Conference	Foot- ball	M	W	Base- ball	Soft- ball	M	W
Langston Lions	Langston University	Langston	Sooner	Yes	Yes	Yes	No	Yes	No	No
Mid-America Christian Evangels	Mid-America Christian University	Oklahoma City	Sooner	No	Yes	Yes	Yes	Yes	Yes	Yes
Oklahoma City Stars	Oklahoma City University	Oklahoma City	Sooner	No	Yes	Yes	Yes	Yes	Yes	Yes
Oklahoma Panhandle State Aggies	Oklahoma Panhandle State University	Goodwell	Sooner	Yes	Yes	Yes	Yes	Yes	Yes	Yes
USAO Drovers	University of Science and Arts of Oklahoma	Chickasha	Sooner	No	Yes	Yes	Yes	Yes	Yes	Yes
Oklahoma Wesleyan Eagles	Oklahoma Wesleyan University	Bartlesville	Kansas	No	Yes	Yes	Yes	Yes	Yes	Yes
Southwestern Christian Eagles	Southwestern Christian University	Bethany	Sooner	No	Yes	Yes	Yes	Yes	Yes	Yes

== NJCAA ==
Full NJCAA member colleges in Oklahoma.
– Football member, – Non-football member

Team	School	City	Conference
Carl Albert State Vikings	Carl Albert State College	Poteau	Bi-State
Connors State Cowboys	Connors State College	Warner	Bi-State
Eastern Oklahoma State Mountaineers	Eastern Oklahoma State College	Wilburton	Bi-State
Murray State Aggies	Murray State College	Tishomingo	Bi-State
Northeastern Oklahoma A&M Golden Norsemen	Northeastern Oklahoma A&M College	Miami	Bi-State
Northern Oklahoma Enid Jets	Northern Oklahoma College	Enid	Bi-State
Northern Oklahoma Tonkawa Mavericks	Northern Oklahoma College	Tonkawa	Bi-State
Redlands Cougars	Redlands Community College	El Reno	Bi-State
Rose State Raiders	Rose State College	Midwest City	Bi-State
Seminole State Trojans	Seminole State College	Seminole	Bi-State
Western Oklahoma State Pioneers	Western Oklahoma State College	Altus	Bi-State

== NCCAA ==
Team	School	City	Conference
Randall University Saints	Randall University	Moore	

== ACCA ==
Team	School	City	Conference
Rhema Eagles	Rhema Bible Training College	Broken Arrow	

== See also ==
- List of NCAA Division I institutions
- List of NCAA Division II institutions
- List of NCAA Division III institutions
- List of NAIA institutions
- List of USCAA institutions
- List of NCCAA institutions
- List of NJCAA Division I institutions
- List of NJCAA Division II institutions
- List of NJCAA Division III institutions
