= OOW =

OOW may refer to:

- EverQuest: Omens of War, a massively multiplayer online role-playing game (MMORPG)
- Officer of watch; see Watchstanding
- Oklahoma Ordnance Works
- Out of warranty
- Out Of Work
