= H71 =

H71 may refer to:

- H71 (men's handball)
- H71 (women's handball)
- MidAmerica Industrial Park Airport
- HMS Harpy (H71)
- HMS Parker (H71)
- HMS Tempest (H71)
