= Discovering Psychology (book) =

Textbook on psychology by Don H. Hockenbury and Sandra E. Hockenbury

- Discovering Psychology
- Author: Don H. Hockenbury, Sandra E. Hockenbury
- Language: English
- Genre: Psychology
- Publisher: Worth Publishers
- Publication date: 2012 (6th edition)
- Pages: 843
- ISBN: 978-1429216500

Discovering Psychology is an introductory textbook on psychology written by Don H. Hockenbury and Sandra E. Hockenbury. Don Hockenbury is a recipient of the Tulsa Community College Award for Teaching Excellence.
