= Robert Funk =

Robert Funk may refer to:

- Robert W. Funk (1926–2005), American biblical scholar
- Robert A. Funk (1940–2025), founder and CEO of Express Employment Professionals
