= MidAmerica Industrial Park =

Coordinates: 36°14′46″N 95°17′10″W

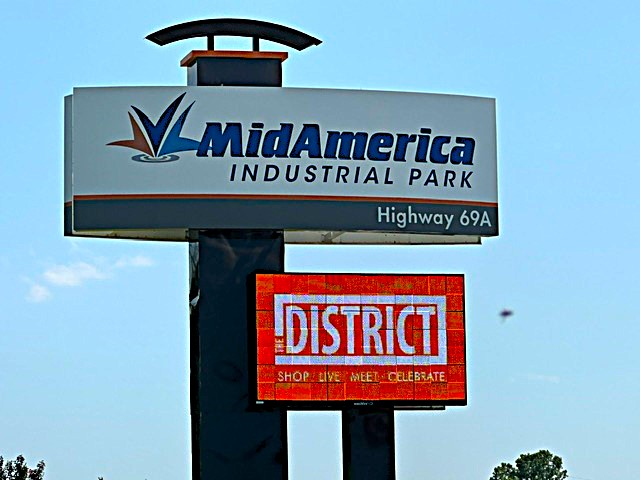
MidAmerica Industrial Park sign, with additional signage for The District retail space, 7-2026

MidAmerica Industrial Park (MAIP), which is Oklahoma's largest industrial park, the third-largest industrial park in the United States, and the eighth-largest industrial park in the world, is located in Pryor, Oklahoma. In 2023, over 80 firms were located within the park including operations of five Fortune 500 companies such as Google, DuPont and Nordam, employing more than 4,500 people and generating more than $732 million in salaries and wages each year. The park was founded in 1960, when the US Federal Government sold most of the former Oklahoma Ordnance Works to a public trust, the Oklahoma Ordnance Works Authority. The rural park covers 9,000 acres (36 km^{2}) and is located 47 miles (76 km) east of Tulsa, Oklahoma.

== Tenants ==
In 2007, MAIP saw Google construct its second-largest Google Data Center in the world. On August 13, 2025, Google announced an additional $9 billion investment over the next two years, spread among the existing data center and brand-new facilities in Stillwater and elsewhere in Oklahoma.

Urgent Care of Green Country (UCGC) opened their Pryor/MidAmerica clinic at MAIP on January 19, 2009. Independently owned, UCGC was founded in 2002 by Dr. Stephen R. Kovacs and Dr. S. Addison Beeson. The 4,400-square-foot (410 m^{2}) facility includes a reception area, doctor's office, eight exam/treatment rooms, EMR (Electronic Medical Records), in-house x-ray, orthopedics and lab services. The clinic will treat employees from MAIP industries and area businesses that require occupational health services such as: in-depth diagnostic and treatment for most occupational injuries; drug testing; employee physicals; and, sports physicals. Additionally, UCGC offers “walk-in treatment” with no appointment necessary for the general public from throughout Mayes County.

Tulsa Life Flight, a helicopter ambulance service formerly based solely at Saint Francis Hospital in Tulsa, will open a second base of operations at MAIP's airport. Tulsa Life Flight was established in 1979. It was the thirteenth helicopter air ambulance to be established in the US and the first in Oklahoma. To date, Tulsa Life Flight has completed more than 42,200 accident free flights. The aircraft are owned and operated by Air Methods Corporation, the largest air ambulance corporation in the world. The firm contracts with Saint Francis Hospital to provide aircraft, pilots and mechanics.

In February 2020, MAIP opened The Center of Excellence in the refurbished space of the former OSU Institute of Technology Training Center, which closed in December 2018. The 25,000-square-foot (2,300 m^{2}) Center is consortium-based and dedicated to technology, training and career opportunities.

In 2022, electric vehicle manufacturer Canoo announced construction of a vehicle battery production facility at MAIP, following a significant order from California-based fleet management company Zeeba. This followed its earlier announcement of a vehicle production plant at MAIP capable of producing 300,000 cars per year. In April 2023 the company announced that vehicle battery assembly, using basic battery components from Panasonic, would proceed at Pryor to fulfill a United States Department of Defense contract; and, while vehicle manufacturing was to start at an Oklahoma City location before the end of 2023, long range plans still included vehicle assembly at Pryor because the OKC facility would not meet full production needs. Regardless, Canoo announced filing for Chapter 7 bankruptcy (liquidation) in mid-January, 2025.

Panasonic, which had earlier considered constructing a large battery manufacturing plant at MAIP before selecting an alternate site in Kansas, nevertheless signed an agreement with the State of Oklahoma in April 2023 to place another battery manufacturing facility at MAIP, but subject to resolution of certain funding issues. However, by the end of 2023, those plans were on hold in the face of falling market demand for EV's.

In July of 2021, a development called The District was opened, incorporating 32,000 square feet of retail space. By 2026, the District covered 162 acres, had at least one restaurant, parks, trails, and more than 140 luxury apartments with a wait list for occupancy. A planned Phase III will include residential homes, as well as parks and outdoor spaces.

In May, 2025, MidAmerica landed CBC Global Ammunition for a facility which can produce centerfire cartridges ranging from 9mm to 12.7mm, for law enforcement, military, sports and hunting use. The investment will be in the range of $300 million and will provide 350 jobs.

== Transportation ==
=== MidAmerica Industrial Park Airport ===
MAIP has its own airfield. The MidAmerica Industrial Park Airport features a single 5,000-foot (1,500 m) asphalt runway which was refurbished in 2016. By the end of 2023, plans were in place for a new terminal for the airport, as well as runway expansion.

For commercial flights, MAIP is about 42 miles from Tulsa International Airport.

=== Roads, Rails and Barges ===
Roadwise, MAIP has access to four interstate highways. The park has an on-site Union Pacific Railroad switchyard. And, MAIP is close to the McClellan–Kerr Arkansas River Navigation System, providing barge transportation to the Mississippi River and beyond.

== Newsletter ==
MAIP publishes a quarterly newsletter called MidPoint to share "news, views and other information" about the park and the industries that it serves. A complimentary subscription is available to individuals who are involved in site-selection decision-making for their respective companies.

== Leadership ==
In November 2012, Oklahoma Governor Mary Fallin appointed David Stewart as the chief administrative officer of the Oklahoma Ordnance Works Authority (OOWA). He succeeded Sanders Mitchell, who had headed the authority for 35 years before retiring. Stewart was formerly president and chief executive officer (CEO) of Cherokee Nation Businesses LLC and the wholly owned parent/holding company of the Cherokee Nation, which is charged with the economic development and business diversification across the Cherokee Nation's business entities. Sanders Mitchell had been hired by OOWA in 1977 to serve as general manager of the industrial park. He was promoted to the position of general manager for OOWA in 1990, following the death of the original chief administrative office, board member and founder of the Mid-America Industrial Park, Gene R. Redden, who served in this capacity from its inception in 1961 until his death in 1990. (Note: Gene R. Redden had come to OOWA in 1947 as its first General Manager. During 1958 and 1959, Gene Redden wrote a proposal about how a large part of the Ordnance Works land could be purchased from the U.S. General Services Administration, (GSA), and turned into what would have been at that time the largest industrial park in the United States. Gene Redden took his proposal to the Pryor Chamber of Commerce and other local leaders and to State and national officials from Oklahoma and convinced them to urge the GSA to allow the sale of the OOWA land to a Trust established by the State of Oklahoma. This Trust would become the Oklahoma Ordnance Works Authority Trust to manage and operate the property as an industrial park. The State of Oklahoma would not put up any money for the $1.7 million purchase price, but instead would be the supporter of the trust and if it failed the land would escheat to the State of Oklahoma. Financing of the purchase was put up by a secured loan from The First National Bank of Tulsa, whose Executive Vice-President, Russell F. Hunt, would be placed on the OOWA Board of Directors as its Chairman, appointed for life by Everett Boecher, President Pro Tempore of the Oklahoma Senate. Gene Redden was appointed for life by Oklahoma's Governor, J. Howard Edmondson, as the Trust Administrator. Oklahoma City businessman, Burke Webb, was the third permanent lifetime member of the OOWA Board and was appointed by J.D. McCarty, Speaker of the Oklahoma House of Representatives. After Gene Redden took over as Administrator, a salvage company was retained to salvage as much of the old powder plant as it could, with half of the sale proceeds to go to OOWA. The salvage funds received by OOWA from the sales more than paid off the First National Bank purchase loan and the Trust was debt free. The MidAmerica Industrial Park continued to prosper from that point on for 60 years to date through its succession of skilled management teams. Gene Redden is recognized throughout the State of Oklahoma as the "Founder of the MidAmerical Industrial Park" and is attested to by a Joint Resolution presented to him in person during a joint meeting of the Oklahoma Senate and House of Representatives held on May 2, 1989. Gene Redden's tribute as MAIP Founder is inscribed onto a bronze plaque outside the entrance to the MAIP Administrative Office that reads: "GENE R. REDDEN, Founder of the MidAmerica Industrial Park...A man of vision, insight and perseverance. Gene Redden recognized the vast potential of the former World War II powder plant located on this site. Redden envisioned an Industrial complex that would employ thousands of northeastern Oklahomans. Today, Gene Redden's dream is a reality. For 29 years he served the Oklahoma Ordnance Works Authority as Administrator of the MidAmerica Industrial Park. His courage and enthusiasm knew no limits. This facility is dedicated in his honor.")
