= Shelly Crow =

American nurse and nursing administrator

- Crow, circa 1990s
- Born: Shelly Lynn Stubbs; January 27, 1948; Henryetta, Oklahoma
- Died: May 23, 2011 (aged 63); Tulsa, Oklahoma
- Other name: Shelly Stubbs Crow
- Education: Tulsa Junior College; Northeastern State University
- Occupations: Nurse, nursing administrator, and politician

Shelly Crow (January 27, 1948 – May 23, 2011) was an American nurse and nursing administrator, who worked for the Indian Health Service and was the first Muscogee woman elected to serve in the Muscogee Nation's executive branch. She was fourth elected Second Chief (vice president) of the nation, serving from 1992 to 1996 in the administration of Chief Bill Fife.

Crow was born and grew up in Henryetta, Oklahoma, before moving to Tulsa, where she graduated from Webster High School. She earned a nursing degree from Tulsa Junior College, a bachelor's degree from Northeastern State University and a master's degree from the University of Oklahoma. She worked as a nurse in private hospitals and for the Indian Health Service until 1989, when she began teaching as a nursing instructor at started Langston University. She later taught at the University of Tulsa.

Crow had a lengthy volunteer service record in health policy. In 1987, she was appointed to President Ronald Reagan's Presidential Commission on the Human Immunodeficiency Virus Epidemic and from 1989 served on the Muscogee Nation Hospital and Clinics Board, which she chaired from 1990 to 1992. After her election as second chief, Crow was appointed to a three-year term on the Oklahoma Indian Affairs Commission. She was instrumental in developing an HIV/AIDS educational program for the tribe, and served as the only Oklahoma member of the Clinton Health Care Task Force in 1993. When her term ended in 1996, Crow served as a policy analyst for the Muscogee Nation Division of Health Administration for four years. Between 1998 and 2002, she also was a board member on the National Advisory Committee on Rural Health. Her service to the tribe and community were recognized by several awards.

== Early life and education ==
Shelly Lynn Stubbs was born on January 27, 1948, in Henryetta, Okmulgee County, Oklahoma to Dorthea (née Beaver) and Everett W. Stubbs. Her mother was biracial and, along with her three daughters, were "members of the Raccoon Clan and Tuckabatcheee Tribal Town" of the Muscogee Nation. Her maternal grandfather, Joe M. Beaver was a full-blood member of the tribe and active in Native American affairs, and her great-grandmother, Rose Beaver-Starr was one of the founders of the Hickory Ground Baptist Church #1 in McIntosh County. Her father's heritage was Welsh and Native descent. He served in World War II and worked in the oil industry. Stubbs grew up in Henryetta, but her family later moved to Tulsa, where she graduated from Webster High School in 1966.

Stubbs married John Leslie Crow, III in 1969. John would later work as a financial advisor in the oil and gas industry. The couple had two children, Leslie (b. 1975) and John IV (1979–1995). Crow earned her nursing degree from Tulsa Junior College (now Tulsa Community College) in 1975, and began her career at Hillcrest Medical Center in Tulsa. In addition to nursing, she participated in many voluntary organizations, focused on Native education. She was chair of the Indian Parent Committee in Jenks and worked with educators from Oklahoma and Kansas to develop a curricula for gifted Indigenous students. The goal was to help students to participate in computer science, fine arts, and mathematics workshops. She also served on the board of the Tulsa chapters of the American Diabetes Association and the AIDS Coalition and was on the Tulsa Perinatal Task Force. Her volunteer work was recognized by the Oklahoma Council for Indian Education in 1986, when she was selected as the state Parent of the Year.

== Career ==
=== Nursing ===
Crow worked for the Indian Health Service, as a public health nurse for the Cherokee Nation at Hastings Indian Hospital in Tahlequah and returned to school in 1985. She obtained a Bachelor of Science degree in nursing from Northeastern State University in 1987, and was appointed to President Ronald Reagan's first Presidential Commission on the Human Immunodeficiency Virus Epidemic. Continuing her education, she earned a Master of Science in public health with a specialty in clinical nursing from the University of Oklahoma in 1989. That year, she was honored by the University of Oklahoma Health Sciences Center with the American Indian Academic Achievement Award, began serving on the Muscogee Nation Hospital and Clinics Board, and started teaching nursing at Langston University.

In 1990, Crow was elected as president of the Tulsa Indian Committee of the Muscogee Nation. She also became chair of the Muscogee Nation Hospital and Clinics Board. The board was tasked with investigating alleged mismanagement at facilities serving the Muscogee nation and working with the Bureau of Indian Affairs to secure adequate funds for implementing child welfare and family service programs. Although she was criticized, under her tenure, both the Indian Health Service and Muscogee National Council recognized the board as the official governing body of the Muscogee health system. She also established a behavioral science department within the health system and hired physicians and staff to serve the clinics and put the health service on sound financial footing. Concerned about the HIV/AIDs epidemic among Native Americans, she organized a conference in 1990 to discuss tribal policy development and preventative education programs which could be implemented with culturally appropriate treatment plans. From 1991, she taught nursing at the University of Tulsa.

=== Politics ===
In 1970, the Muscogee Nation was granted the right to self-determination, and in 1971, Claude Cox was elected as the first Principal Chief since the tribe was reorganized. Crow announced her candidacy for the tribal election held in 1991, the first time Cox was not running for re-election. She ran against three men, and was elected as the first woman to serve on the tribal government's executive branch, and the fourth second chief (vice president) to serve the nation. She was the second chief from 1992 until 1996 serving in the administration of Principal Chief Bill Fife.

Crow was appointed by Governor David Boren in 1992, to serve a three-year term on the Oklahoma Indian Affairs Commission, and acted as chair for the first two years of her term. That year, she also assisted in finalizing the HIV/AIDS tribal educational program, which launched in September. She served on the Health Care Task Force established by Hillary Clinton in 1993. Crow had met Clinton at an event in Tulsa in 1992 and when she heard about the task force, wrote a letter to the First Lady outlining the special concerns for Native health. The letter prompted her appointment as the only member from Oklahoma to work on the initiative to create a national health program. The appointment caused a petition of intent to be filed for her removal as second chief, alleging she would not have sufficient time to fulfill her duties to the tribe. The petition did not gain sufficient signatures (2,500) to move forward to a vote by the Muscogee National Council. Other petitions to remove both Crow and Fife were filed in July 1993 and March 1994, but they also failed to gain adequate support. Crow was one of the speakers at the White House Conference on Aging and Nutrition held in Little Rock, Arkansas in 1994.

Crow unsuccessfully challenged to be the principal chief in the 1995 tribal elections. After leaving office, Crow served as a policy analyst for the Muscogee Nation Division of Health Administration from 1996 to 2000, and returned to teaching at both Langston and the University of Tulsa. Simultaneously, she was appointed in 1998 to a term on the National Advisory Committee on Rural Health. The eighteen-member board advised the United States' Congress and President on health care issues for rural communities. Crow's term on the advisory committee extended through 2002. She unsuccessfully ran for a seat on the Muscogee National Council in 2001. That year she was recognized by Tulsa Community College as the third recipient of the Best of TCC Award for her service and professionalism in health care for the Muscogee Nation. In 2001, she also became a health care consultant to the Dustin Public Schools. Crow was honored by Chief A. D. Ellis in 2008, for her service to the tribe.

== Death and legacy ==
Crow died on May 23, 2011, at Saint Francis Hospital in Tulsa. She is remembered for her political milestone as the first woman to serve on the executive branch of the Muscogee National Council and her work to improve Native health services. Her published works on alcoholism within the nation and nursing have been incorporated into health training text books. The John Crow IV Memorial Foundation she and her husband began in memory of their son, provides scholarships to Muscogee youth for higher education, and sponsors health campaigns against tobacco and alcohol use.

== Selected works ==
- Wing, Donna Marie; Crow, Shelly S.; Thompson, Timmy (July 1995). "An Ethnonursing Study of Muscogee (Creek) Indians and Effective Health Care Practices for Treating Alcohol Abuse". Family & Community Health. 18 (2). Philadelphia, Pennsylvania: Lippincott Williams & Wilkins: 52–64. doi:10.1097/00003727-199507000-00009. ISSN 0160-6379. OCLC 4937690889. S2CID 75742522.
- Crow, Shelly (1997). "82. Bridging Cultures: Native Americans and Nursing". In McCloskey, Joanne Comi; Grace, Helen Kennedy (eds.). Current Issues in Nursing (5th ed.). St. Louis, Missouri: Mosby. pp. 609–612. ISBN 978-0-8151-8594-9.
