= Caleb Hickman =

Native American biologist and zoologist

Caleb R. Hickman
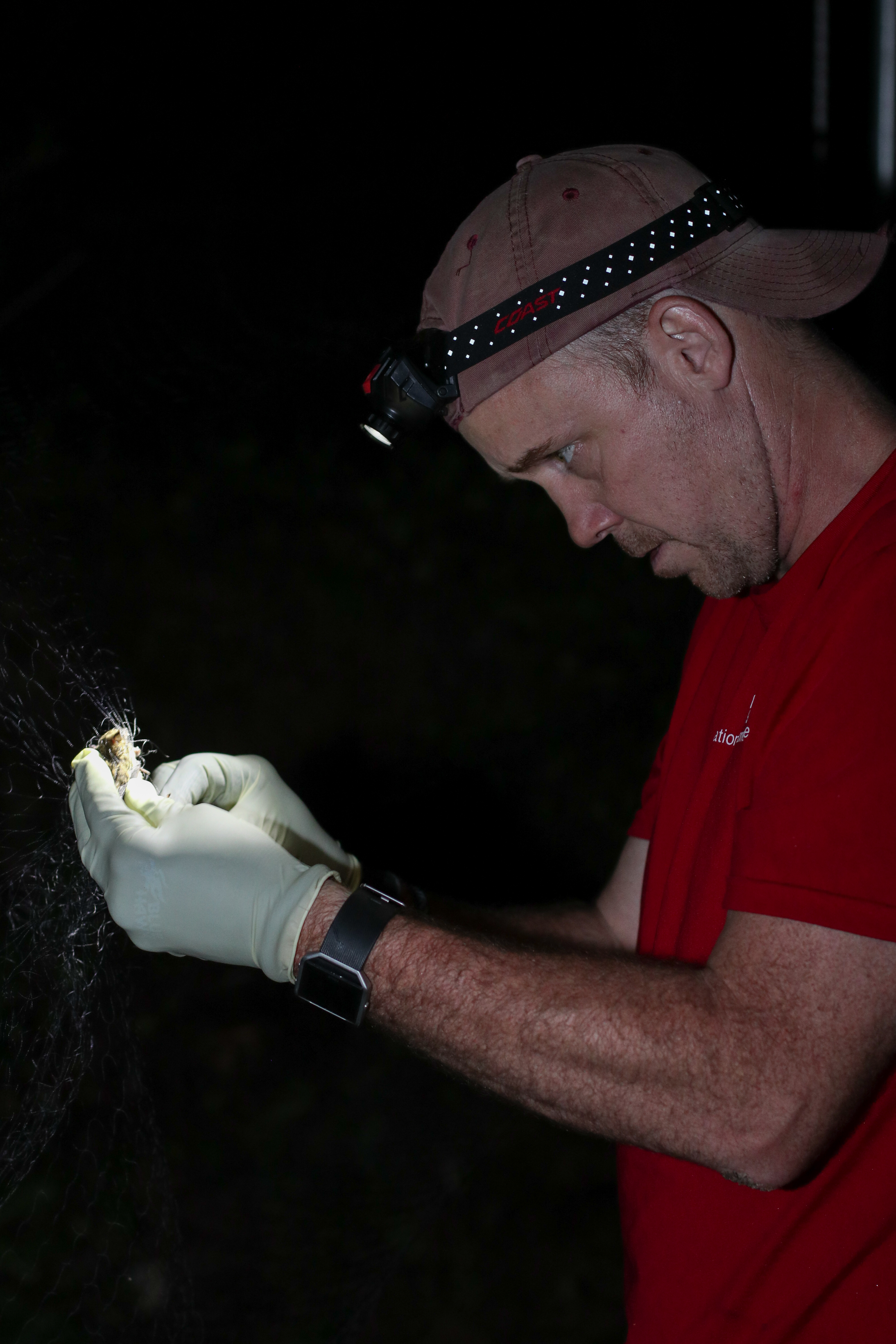
- Born: 1977 (age 48–49); Pryor Creek, Oklahoma
- Citizenship: Cherokee Nation and U.S.
- Education: PhD: University of Wisconsin–Madison, MS: Missouri State University, BA: Missouri Valley College
- Awards: Native American Fish & Wildlife Society Biologist of the Year (2022)
- Scientific career
- Fields: zoology, biology
- Workplaces: Eastern Band of Cherokee Indians

Caleb R. Hickman (born in August 1977) is a Native American biologist and zoologist. He is an active advocate and citizen of the Cherokee Nation.

== Early life ==
Born in August 1977 and raised in Pryor Creek, Oklahoma, Caleb is the third born of four sons in his family of six. During his childhood, he spent the majority of his time outside around Lake Hudson, where he explored, hunted, and fished with his family. Both sides of his family are involved or connected to wildlife and environmental careers. His maternal grandfather was employed with the Oklahoma Department of Wildlife Conservation, and his paternal grandfather, mother, and father had worked in the industrial park. Hickman is a citizen of the Cherokee Nation.

== Education ==
Hickman put his education and career focus on working with mammals, reptiles, and plants in different environments. After graduating from high school, he attended Missouri Valley College to earn his bachelor's. Continuing his education further, he went on to Missouri State to get his master's degree in biology. After working for six years, he completed with a PhD in zoology from the University of Wisconsin Madison.

== Career ==
Hickman works for the Eastern Band of Cherokee Indians Office of Natural Resources; he is the Supervisory Fisheries and Wildlife Biologist position. Hickman manages projects within the 57,000-acre Qualla Boundary in North Carolina, his priorities are on endangered and culturally important species. He resides in the town of Cherokee around the Great Smoky Mountains, working in the community with the conservation unit to preserve and renew the plant and animal life on the reservation. They focus on a variety of different organisms and species, conserving game and nongame wildlife as well as the ecosystems they reside in. He has worked to restore, boost, and reintroduce the population of many species, such as the sicklefin redhorse and white-tailed deer.

In 2022, Hickman received the biologist of the year award from the Native American Fish & Wildlife Society.

== Publications ==
- Mathis, A., Murray, K. L., & Hickman, C. R. (2003). Do experience and body size play a role in responses of larval ringed salamanders, Ambystoma annulatum, to predator kairomones? Laboratory and field tests. Ethology, 109(2), 159-170.
- Hickman, C. R., Stone, M. D., & Mathis, A. (2004). Priority use of chemical over visual cues for detection of predators by graybelly salamanders, Eurycea multiplicata griseogaster. Herpetologica, 60(2), 203-210.
- Watling, J. I., Hickman, C. R., Lee, E., Wang, K., & Orrock, J. L. (2011). Extracts of the invasive shrub Lonicera maackii increase mortality and alter behavior of amphibian larvae. Oecologia, 165, 153-159.
- Watling, J. I., Hickman, C. R., & Orrock, J. L. (2011). Invasive shrub alters native forest amphibian communities. Biological Conservation, 144(11), 2597-2601.
- Watling, J. I., Hickman, C. R., & Orrock, J. L. (2011). Predators and invasive plants affect the performance of amphibian larvae. Oikos, 120(5), 735-39.
