= Oklahoma Ordnance Works =

Government-owned facility in Mayes County, Oklahoma, US

The Oklahoma Ordnance Works (OOW) was a government-owned, contractor-operated (GOCO) facility that was built in Mayes County, Oklahoma to produce smokeless powder and other military explosives that were to be used during World War II. The facility was closed from 1946 until 1954, when production resumed until 1956, then closed again. In 1960, it was sold to the Oklahoma Ordnance Works Authority (OOWA), which converted most of the facility to become the mid America Industrial Park.

== Background ==
In July 1941, the War Department decided to build a munitions manufacturing facility between Chouteau and Pryor in Mayes County, Oklahoma. Site selection criteria included an ample supply of water and hydroelectric power, relatively level ground and an available local work force. Completion of the nearby Pensacola Dam in 1940 had assured this site would have adequate supplies of electricity and water.

== History ==
=== Initial phase ===
During the summer of 1941, the government began buying approximately 15,000 acres (6,100 ha) of land for the facility. Concurrently, the duPont Company began designing the plant to produce smokeless powder. Although the project, now designated as the Oklahoma Ordnance Works (OOW), was originally estimated to cost $32 million, by September 1941, the estimate had risen to about $80 million. The plant started up in June 1942 and began actual production of smokeless powder in September.

=== Expansion ===
In January 1942, the government formed a War Production Board began to expand powder and munitions production plants. In March 1942, a TNT plant was constructed. Other production plants included those for nitric acid, sulfuric acid and tetryl. Production continued until the war ended in 1945. By the end of the war, the complex covered 16,273 acres (6,585 ha) containing 487 buildings, 24 residences, 50 miles (80 km) of railroad track, and four complete water systems. Ultimately, the OOW produced more than 400,000,000 pounds (180,000 t) of smokeless powder and 90,000,000 pounds (41,000 t) of TNT and tetryl. Production ceased on August 16, 1945.

=== Prisoner of war camp ===
During autumn 1944, some vacant dormitories at the OOW complex were used to house German prisoners of war. They were separated from the rest of the complex by fenced perimeters patrolled by U. S. Army military police and manned guard towers. Some prisoners were allowed to perform farm work, escorted by armed guards, as allowed by the Geneva Convention. Apparently none worked in the OOW facilities. Prisoners were repatriated beginning in the fall of 1945.

=== Reactivation and disposition ===
The complex was put up for sale in 1946, but there were no bidders. The General Services Administration (GSA) sold the electric power and water plants to the state of Oklahoma. The Department of Defense (DOD), successor to the War Department, decided to keep the rest of the complex, then reactivated the plant for production from 1954 until 1956.

GSA then offered the facility for lease in 1958. Instead, it was sold in 1960 to the State of Oklahoma. The Oklahoma Ordnance Works Authority (OOWA), a public trust, was formed in December 1960 to redevelop and administer twelve thousand acres of the complex into the mid America Industrial Park.

== Effect on Oklahoma economy ==
OOW had a major impact on the economy of eastern Oklahoma. Most importantly, it was a source of employment for thousands of people. Other projects were begun to house the five to ten thousand workers who would be needed to build and operate the facility. The area enclosed by Chouteau, Pryor and Locust Grove, Oklahoma began to be known as the "Golden Triangle," because of its sudden economic boom. A $500,000 sewer and water improvement project for Chouteau was funded by OOW. The United States Housing Authority built 500 homes for workers in Pryor, while the Home Owners' Loan Corporation funded 335 more. Because of the conversion to an industrial park, the net positive impact has continued into the 21st Century.

== See also ==
- MidAmerica Industrial Park
