= Pryor Creek, Oklahoma =

- City
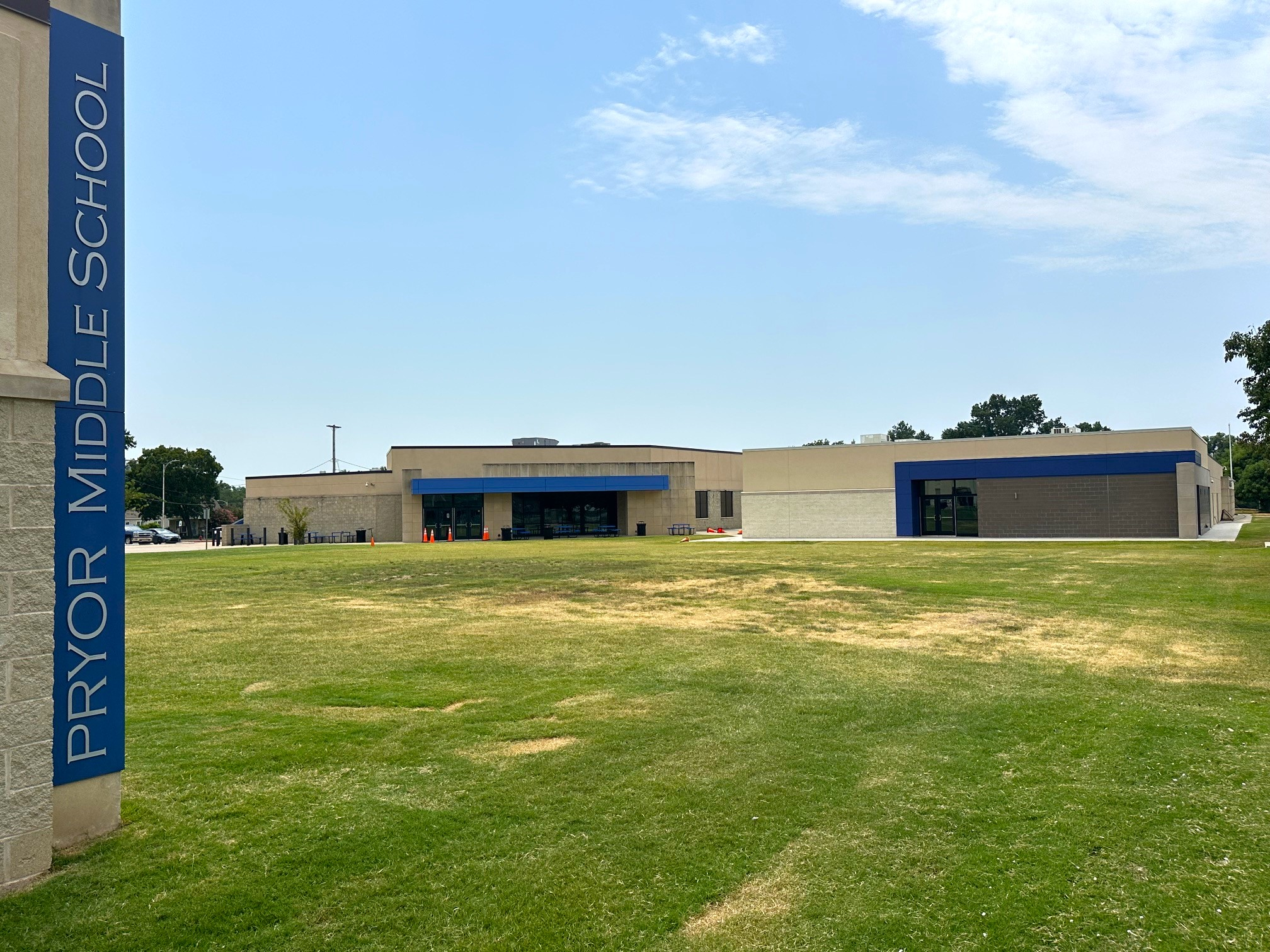
- Pryor Middle School in August of 2026

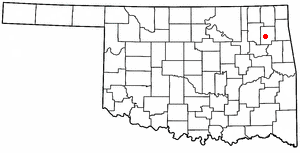
- Location in Oklahoma
- Coordinates: 36°17′30″N 95°19′05″W
- Country: United States
- State: Oklahoma
- County: Mayes
- Named for: Nathaniel Hale Pryor

Government
  - Mayor: Zac Doyle

Area
  - Total: 10.16 sq mi (26.3 km^{2})
  - Land: 10.12 sq mi (26.2 km^{2})
  - Water: 0.04 sq mi (0.10 km^{2}) 0.37%
- Elevation: 627 ft (191 m)

Population (2020)
  - Total: 9,444
  - Density: 933.2/sq mi (360.3/km^{2})
- Time zone: UTC-6 (CST)
  - Summer (DST): UTC-5 (CDT)
- ZIP Codes: 74361, 74362
- Area code: 918/539
- FIPS code: 40-60950
- GNIS feature ID: 2411500
- Website: www.pryorcreek.org

Pryor Creek or Pryor is a city in and the county seat of Mayes County, Oklahoma, United States. The population was 9,444 as of the 2020 census.

Originally named Coo-Y-Yah, Cherokee for "place of the huckleberries", it was renamed "Pryor Creek" in 1887 after the local railroad station, which was named for the nearby creek. Due to confusion in distinguishing handwritten mailing addresses to Pryor Creek and Pond Creek, the U.S. Postal Service name for the city was shortened to Pryor, and both names are in common usage.

== History ==
In the early 1800s, treaties with the Cherokee, Osage, and Choctaw gave the tribes allotments in Indian Territory in the region that would become Oklahoma. Captain Nathaniel Hale Pryor, who was married to an Osage woman and served as an agent to the Osage people, was among those settling northeastern Oklahoma. He established a trading post on the Grand River, shortly before the Union Mission was established 5 miles (8 km) southeast of present-day Chouteau in 1820.

Pryor Creek is along the path of the Texas Road cattle trail, and the later Jefferson Highway of the early National Trail System, both roughly along the route of U.S. Route 69 through Oklahoma today.

In 1870, the Missouri–Kansas–Texas Railroad started construction in the Cherokee Nation along the Kansas border, laying tracks to Texas. By June 1871, the railroad reached present-day Pryor Creek.

A post office was eventually established naming the town Coo-y-yah, Indian Territory. Coo-y-yah is Cherokee for "place of the huckleberries". On April 23, 1887, Coo-y-yah was changed to Pryor Creek, but the "Creek" was dropped by the post office on January 26, 1909. The official name of the city government is still Pryor Creek despite a proposition put before voters in 1963 to change the name officially to Pryor.

On April 27, 1942, a tornado swept along Pryor's main street from the western edge of the business district to the eastern edge of the city, destroying nearly every building and causing extensive damage to the residential section. The storm killed 52 people, according to the U.S. Weather Bureau, but The Associated Press set the total at 60 two days after the storm. More than 400 were injured in the storm that caused damage estimated at US$3 million.

The F4 tornado struck about 5 p.m. (17:00) local time, an hour and a half after one hit near Talala, Oklahoma, and mowed a path about 5 miles (8 km) long, killing three and injuring 12. Talala, which was not hit, is about 30 miles (48 km) northwest of Pryor Creek. Governor Leon C. Phillips put the area under martial law, but because the Oklahoma National Guard had been activated for service during World War II, he sent state troopers to rescue victims, maintain order and prevent looting.

The Pryor tornado ranks as the fifth deadliest in Oklahoma history behind tornadoes at Woodward in 1947, Snyder in 1905, Peggs in 1920, and Antlers in 1945. The May 3, 1999, tornado at Midwest City caused more damage but fewer deaths.

In 1951, voters approved the present city charter of a mayor-council government system, which provided for the election of a mayor, clerk, treasurer, police chief and eight councilors. The charter also established a cemetery, park, library board, and a municipal utility board, which oversees operations of the city-owned gas, water, electric and sewer systems.

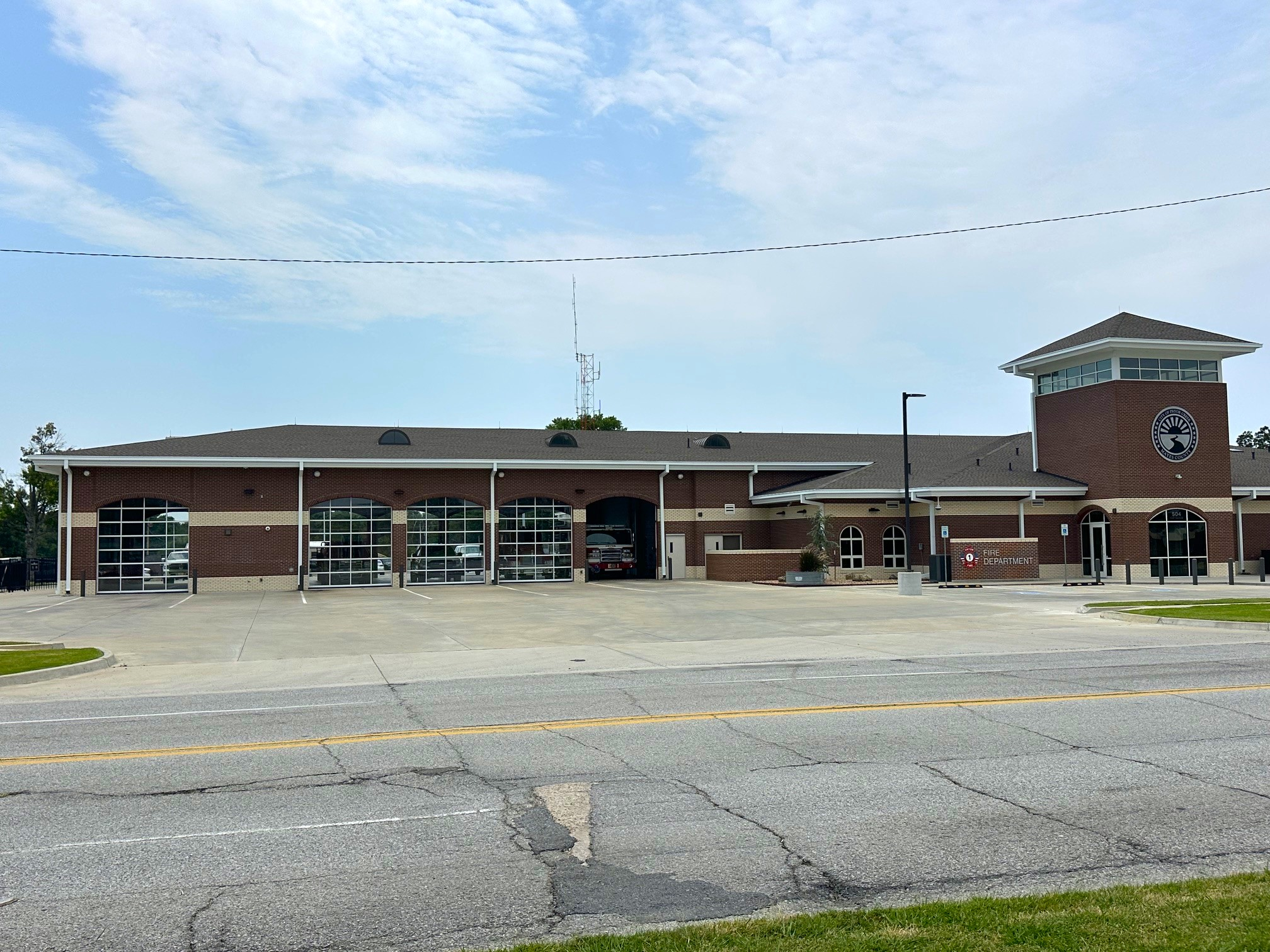
Pryor Creek Fire Department, 8-2026

== Geography ==
Pryor is located in northeast Oklahoma at the intersection of U.S. Route 69 and Oklahoma State Highway 20. US-69 leads north 27 miles (43 km) to Vinita and south 24 miles (39 km) to Wagoner, while SH-20 leads east 9 miles (14 km) to Salina and west 17 miles (27 km) to Claremore.

The stream known as Pryor Creek flows past the west and south sides of the city. According to the U.S. Census Bureau, the city has a total area of 10.2 square miles (26.4 km^{2}), of which 0.04 square miles (0.10 km^{2}), or 0.37%, are water. Via Pryor Creek, the city is within the Neosho River watershed.

=== Climate ===
Climate data for Pryor Creek, Oklahoma (1991–2020)
Month	Jan	Feb	Mar	Apr	May	Jun	Jul	Aug	Sep	Oct	Nov	Dec	Year
Mean daily maximum °F (°C)	47.0 (8.3)	52.9 (11.6)	60.9 (16.1)	70.7 (21.5)	78.6 (25.9)	86.6 (30.3)	91.2 (32.9)	92.1 (33.4)	83.5 (28.6)	73.0 (22.8)	61.0 (16.1)	50.5 (10.3)	70.7 (21.5)
Daily mean °F (°C)	36.0 (2.2)	40.7 (4.8)	49.1 (9.5)	58.4 (14.7)	67.6 (19.8)	76.1 (24.5)	80.4 (26.9)	80.0 (26.7)	71.8 (22.1)	60.0 (15.6)	49.1 (9.5)	39.0 (3.9)	59.0 (15.0)
Mean daily minimum °F (°C)	25.1 (−3.8)	28.5 (−1.9)	37.3 (2.9)	46.2 (7.9)	56.6 (13.7)	65.6 (18.7)	69.6 (20.9)	67.9 (19.9)	60.0 (15.6)	47.0 (8.3)	37.1 (2.8)	27.6 (−2.4)	47.4 (8.5)
Average precipitation inches (mm)	1.99 (51)	2.01 (51)	3.17 (81)	4.67 (119)	5.46 (139)	4.92 (125)	4.59 (117)	3.63 (92)	4.36 (111)	3.66 (93)	3.73 (95)	2.54 (65)	44.73 (1,139)
Average snowfall inches (cm)	2.6 (6.6)	0.7 (1.8)	1.8 (4.6)	0.0 (0.0)	0.0 (0.0)	0.0 (0.0)	0.0 (0.0)	0.0 (0.0)	0.0 (0.0)	0.0 (0.0)	0.5 (1.3)	1.9 (4.8)	7.5 (19.1)
Source: NOAA

== Demographics ==
Historical population
Census	Pop.	Note	%±
1900	495		—
1910	1,798		263.2%
1920	1,767		−1.7%
1930	1,828		3.5%
1940	2,501		36.8%
1950	4,486		79.4%
1960	6,476		44.4%
1970	7,057		9.0%
1980	8,483		20.2%
1990	8,327		−1.8%
2000	8,659		4.0%
2010	9,539		10.2%
2020	9,444		−1.0%
U.S. Decennial Census

=== 2020 census ===
As of the 2020 census, Pryor Creek had a population of 9,444. The median age was 34.8 years. 26.1% of residents were under the age of 18 and 17.3% of residents were 65 years of age or older. For every 100 females there were 95.4 males, and for every 100 females age 18 and over there were 89.9 males age 18 and over.

95.8% of residents lived in urban areas, while 4.2% lived in rural areas.

There were 3,703 households in Pryor Creek, of which 33.0% had children under the age of 18 living in them. Of all households, 40.0% were married-couple households, 19.6% were households with a male householder and no spouse or partner present, and 32.2% were households with a female householder and no spouse or partner present. About 30.8% of all households were made up of individuals and 16.4% had someone living alone who was 65 years of age or older.

There were 4,253 housing units, of which 12.9% were vacant. Among occupied housing units, 52.9% were owner-occupied and 47.1% were renter-occupied. The homeowner vacancy rate was 3.0% and the rental vacancy rate was 8.1%.

Racial composition as of the 2020 census
Race	Percent
White	62.4%
Black or African American	1.0%
American Indian and Alaska Native	16.8%
Asian	1.0%
Native Hawaiian and Other Pacific Islander	0.1%
Some other race	2.1%
Two or more races	16.6%
Hispanic or Latino (of any race)	6.2%

=== 2010 census ===
As of the 2010 census, Pryor Creek had a population of 9,539. The racial and ethnic composition of the population was 72.3% white, 0.7% African American, 16.9% Native American, 0.6% Asian, 1.9% reporting some other race and 7.7% reporting two or more races. Hispanic or Latino Americans were 4.9% of the population.

=== 2000 census ===
As of the 2000 census, there were 8,659 people, 3,567 households, and 2,343 families residing in the city. The population density was 1,332.5 inhabitants per square mile (514.5/km^{2}). There were 3,887 housing units at an average density of 598.2 per square mile (231.0/km^{2}). The racial makeup of the city was 77.91% White, 0.29% African American, 14.12% Native American, 0.62% Asian, 0.02% Pacific Islander, 0.97% from other races, and 6.06% from two or more races. Hispanic or Latino were 2.78% of the population.

There were 3,567 households, out of which 30.2% had children under the age of 18 living with them, 52.1% were married couples living together, 10.6% had a female householder with no husband present, and 34.3% were non-families. 30.9% of households were made up of individuals, and 16.3% had someone living alone who was 65 years of age or older. The average household size was 2.35 and the average family size was 2.95.

In the city, the population was spread out, with 26.1% under the age of 18, 9.5% from 18 to 24, 25.7% from 25 to 44, 19.9% from 45 to 64, and 18.8% who were 65 years of age or older. The median age was 36 years. For every 100 females, there were 91.4 males. For every 100 females age 18 and over, there were 84.6 males.

The median income for a household in the city was $29,424, and the median income for a family was $37,115. Males had a median income of $33,547 versus $20,737 for females. The per capita income for the city was $16,887. About 10.8% of families and 13.6% of the population were below the poverty line, including 19.9% of those under age 18 and 6.4% of those age 65 or over.

== Government ==
The mayor is elected citywide for a four-year term. The city is divided into four wards which each elect two councilmen to two-year terms. A city treasurer, city clerk and police are also elected citywide to two-year terms. The current mayor is Zac Doyle, elected in 2023.

== Education ==
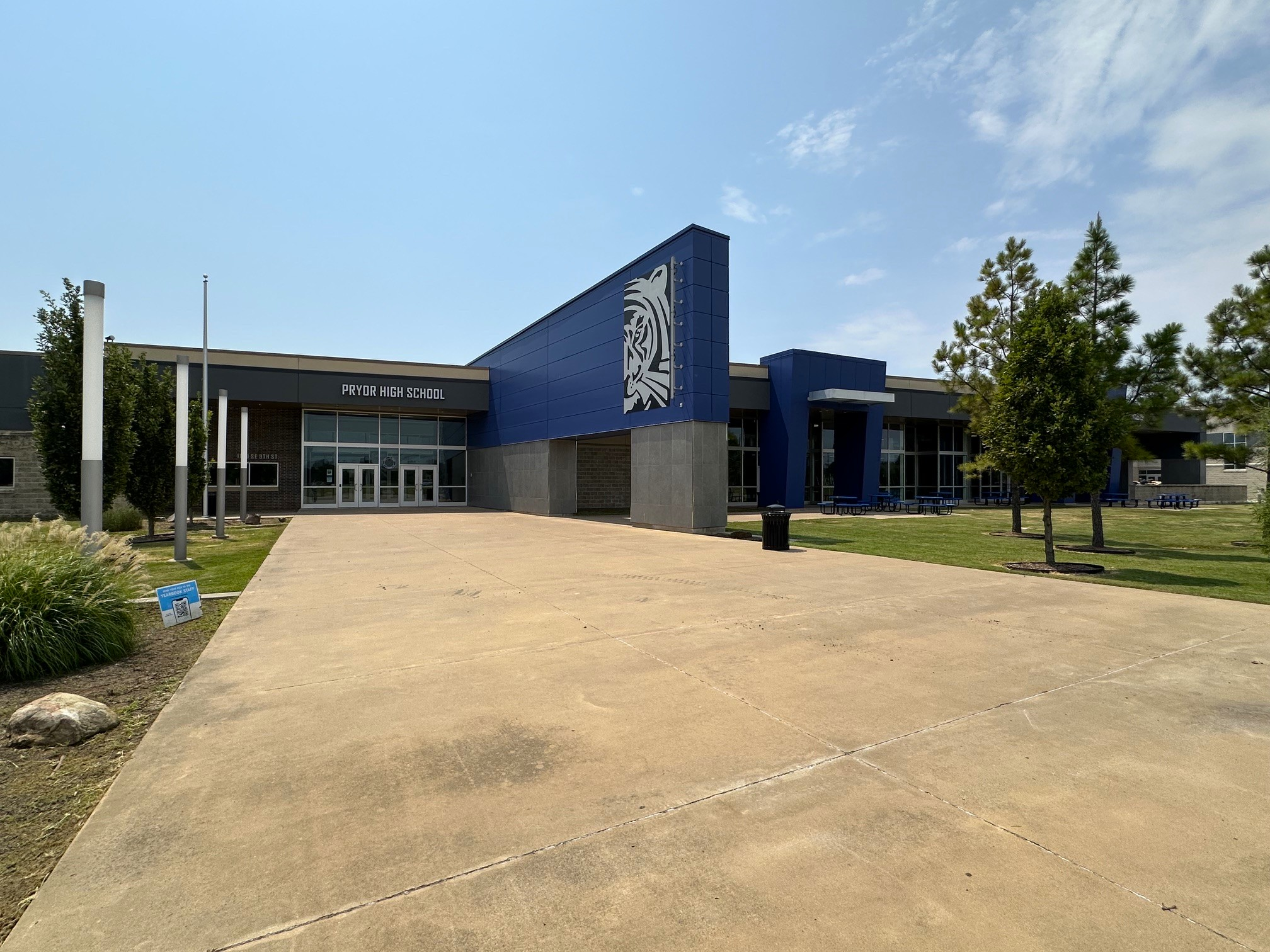
Pryor High School in August of 2026

The majority of the city is in the Pryor Public Schools school district. A portion is in the Osage Public School elementary school district.

Pryor Creek Public Schools includes one early childhood center, three primary schools, one junior high school, one senior high school, a performing arts auditorium and a basketball arena.

Pryor is the location of the administrative office and one of the four campuses of Northeast Tech, a vocational and technical school. The Pryor campus has approximately 400 students. Pryor's school colors were changed in 2025 to black and blue. Prior to 2025 they were the blue and gold tigers.

Rogers State University has a branch campus in Pryor. The Rogers State University Pryor campus is the only university serving the Pryor and Mayes County area, and on average more than 350 students attend the campus each semester.

Pryor Creek is also home to Pryor Beauty College.

The Thunderbird Youth Academy, funded by the federal government and operated by the Oklahoma National Guard, is a 22-week program to help high school dropouts restructure their lives. It is open to men and women who are Oklahoma residents, 16 to 18 years old, and is free to the participants. It is held at the site of the former Whitaker State Orphans Home.

== Economy ==
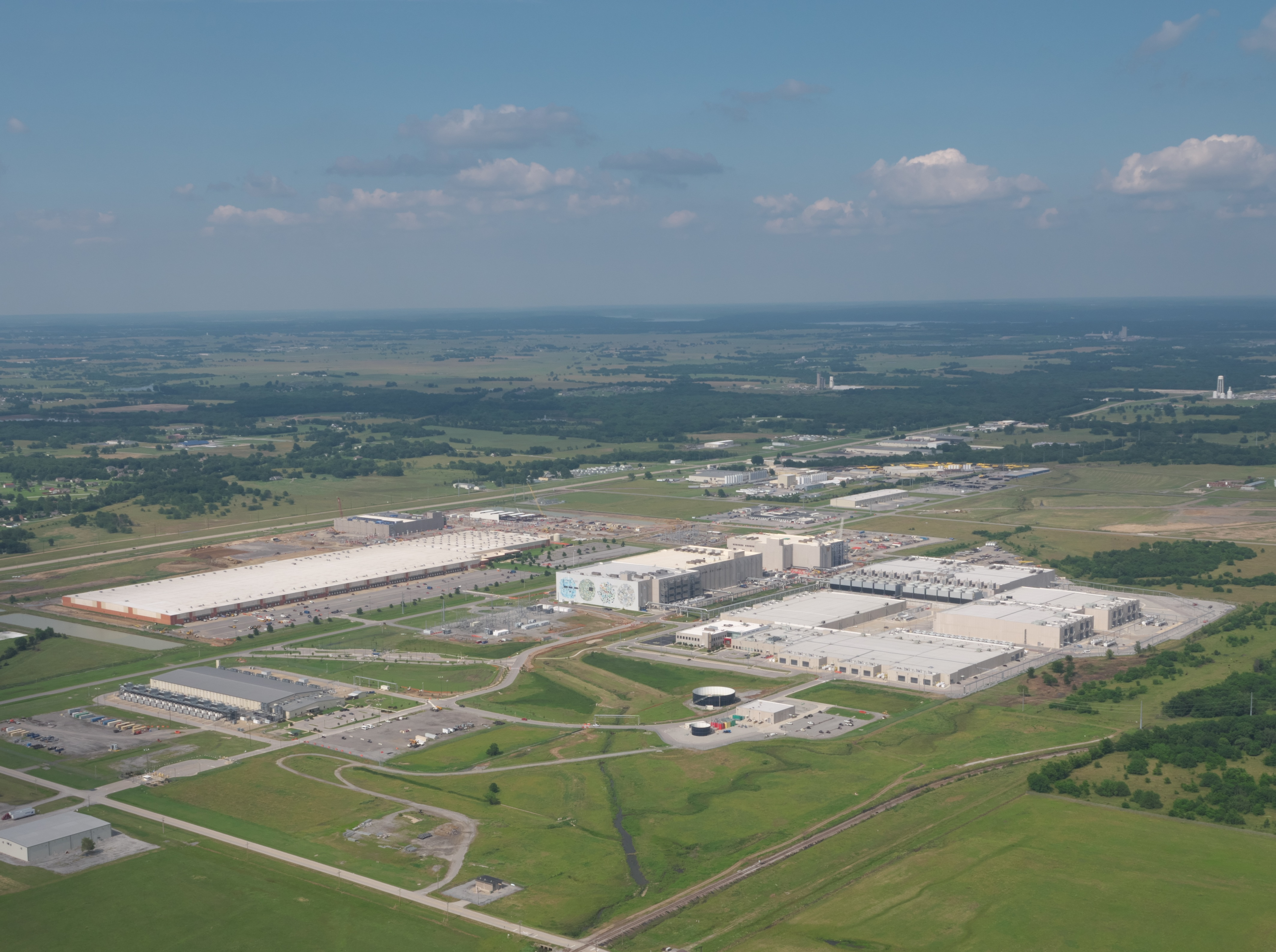
Google Data Center, outside Pryor Creek

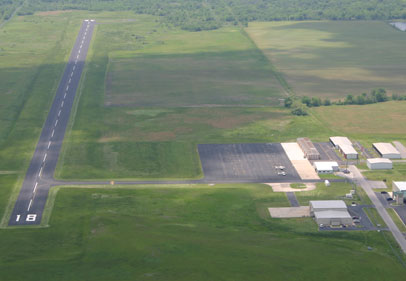
Mid-America Industrial Airport near Pryor Creek

MidAmerica Industrial Park is located about 4 miles (6 km) south of Pryor. It houses more than 80 companies, including Fortune 500 leaders such as Google, DuPont and Nordam. The facility includes its own airfield, the MidAmerica Industrial Park Airport, featuring a 5,000-foot (1,500 m) runway refurbished in 2016.

In May 2007 Google announced its plans to build a large Internet data center at the Mid-America Industrial Park. The $600 million facility is now open and employs around 400 people. It is currently Google's second largest data center in the world. Google shut the worksite down in 2008 because of the status of the United States economy and work on its overseas projects and affairs, then restarted the project in October 2010 and opened at the end of September 2011.

In February 2018, Google announced a $600 million expansion to their data center in Pryor. The investment was to build a new four-story data center, which brought Pryor to be Google's second largest data center in their operations. This brings their total investment in the Pryor community to $2.5 billion.

According to the Encyclopedia of Oklahoma History and Culture, manufacturing employs about 40 percent of the city's workforce. It is the seventh largest manufacturing center in the state. The main industries that it serves are: machinery, metals, electronics and transportation equipment.

== Places and events ==
Pryor hosts Rocklahoma, an annual rock music festival, and Born and Raised, an annual country music festival.

The Coo-Y-Yah Museum is housed in the old Katy Railroad Depot, operated by the Mayes County Historical Society, and contains various Native American and pioneer exhibits.

Pryor was a shooting site for Season 3 of the FX comedy series Reservation Dogs from filmmaker Sterlin Harjo.

== Parks and recreation ==
Area recreational facilities include Pryor Creek Recreation Center, a fitness venue in a 21,000-square-foot (2,000 m^{2}) facility housing an indoor pool, a fully equipped gym and more. Pryor's five city parks include 24-acre (9.7 ha) Whitaker Park, which includes an outdoor pool, a fishing pond, and sport facilities; Centennial Park, which has a walking trail and fitness course; and Earl Ward Park, home to the Pryor Creek Golf Club, an 18-hole, par 72 municipal golf course. Nearby bodies of water include Lake Hudson to the east, Lake Oologah to the northwest, and Fort Gibson Lake to the south.

== Notable people ==
- Preston Bynum (1939-2018), Arkansas politician and businessman
- Joseph J. Clark (1893-1971), admiral in U.S. Navy during WWII; born in Pryor
- Caleb Hickman, biologist, zoologist
- "Indian" Bob Johnson, professional baseball player
- Roy Johnson, professional baseball player
- Chad Kimsey, professional baseball player
- J. H. Langley, associate justice of Oklahoma Supreme Court
- Cliff Mapes, professional baseball player
- Mayes McLain, professional football player and pro-wrestler
- Janees Taylor, Cherokee Nation treasurer (2021–present), tribal councilor (2013-2019)
- Clyde Van Sickle, professional football player
- Hank Wyse, professional baseball player
