= MidAmerica Industrial Park Airport =

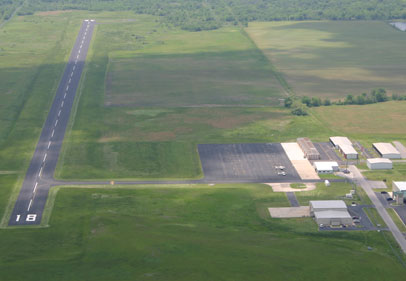
- IATA: none; ICAO: none; FAA LID: H71

Summary
- Airport type: Public-use
- Owner: OK Ordnance Works Auth
- Operator: Shane Bridges
- Serves: Pryor, Oklahoma
- Location: Mayes County, Oklahoma
- Elevation AMSL: 622 ft (190 m)
- Coordinates: 36°13′31.42″N 095°19′48.23″W
- Website: MidAmerica Industrial Park Airport
- Interactive map of MidAmerica Industrial Park Airport

Runways
Direction	Length		Surface
Direction	ft	m	Surface
18/36	5,000	1,524	Asphalt

Statistics (2006)
- Aircraft operations: 16,625
- Based aircraft: 23
- Source: Federal Aviation Administration

The MidAmerica Industrial Park Airport (FAA LID: H71) is located in the MidAmerica Industrial Park, four nautical miles (7.4 km) south of Pryor, Oklahoma, United States. The public-use airport has a 5,000-foot (1,500 m) runway capable of handling most business jets, a PAPI system and 24-hour credit fueling system with both jet fuel and avgas. The airport is classified as a regional business airport (RBA).

== Services ==
The airport has 14 enclosed hangars, 12 open T hangars and tie downs available. Tulsa Life Flight, a helicopter ambulance service formerly based solely at Saint Francis Hospital in Tulsa, opened a second base of operations at MidAmerica Industrial Park's airport.

Founded in 1960, MidAmerica Industrial Park has evolved into one of the leading centers for manufacturing, processing, and distribution in the United States. Often described as the nation's largest rural industrial park, MidAmerica is located between Pryor Creek and Chouteau in northeast Oklahoma just about 38 miles (61 km) east of Tulsa. The development has been recognized by leading economic development publications as a top-ranked expansion or relocation site for growing companies and has been named as a "Certified Industrial Park" by the Oklahoma Department of Commerce.

The 9,000-acre (36 km^{2}) park is owned and operated by a public trust with the sole mission of increasing area employment by bringing new businesses to the region and assisting existing businesses.

== News ==
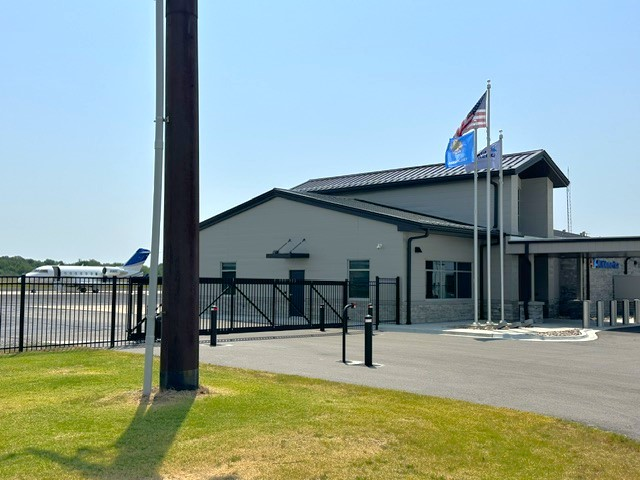
A business jet waiting in front of the Mid America Industrial Airport terminal in August of 2026

Tulsa Life Flight, a helicopter ambulance service formerly based solely at Saint Francis Hospital in Tulsa, will open a second base of operations at MidAmerica Industrial Park’s airport. Tulsa Life Flight was established in 1979. It was the thirteenth helicopter air ambulance to be established in the US and the first in Oklahoma. To date, Tulsa Life Flight has completed more than 42,200 accident free flights, which is a record held only by a few programs in the world. The aircraft are owned and operated by Air Methods Corporation, the largest air ambulance corporation in the world. The firm contracts with Saint Francis Hospital to provide aircraft, pilots and mechanics.

The airport received a multi-million dollar upgrade in 2016, funded by the Federal Aviation Agency, the Oklahoma Aeronautics Commission, and the Oklahoma Ordnance Works Authority.

By the end of 2023, plans were in place for a new terminal for the airport, as well as runway expansion.

== See also ==
- List of airports in Oklahoma
