= Pawnee Nation College =

Pawnee Nation College, or PNC, was founded in 2004 and "is a tribally controlled college based in Pawnee, Oklahoma, that serves traditional and non-traditional students from the Pawnee Nation and beyond."

== History ==
The college uses sandstone buildings that "are part of a historic district, the Pawnee Agency and Indian Boarding School."

In 2025, it was announced that the Pawnee Nation college would partner with Tulsa Community College for as long as it took to gain accreditation. The collaboration is meant to "last at least three years and will help Pawnee Nation College get closer to becoming accredited on its own." In Fall 2025, there were only 10 students enrolled. Alongside TCC, "it will offer degree programs in Business Administration, Child Development, and Environmental Science and Natural Resources."

Through federal funding, they have been able to reach non-traditional students.

== Links ==
https://pawneenationcollege.org/about/
