= Robert A. Funk =

American businessman (1940–2025)

Robert A. Funk Sr.

Chairman of the Federal Reserve Bank of Kansas City
- In office 2006–2007
- Preceded by: Richard H. Bard
- Succeeded by: Lu M. Córdova

Personal details
- Born: May 14, 1940 Duvall, Washington, U.S.
- Died: July 15, 2025 (aged 85) Yukon, Oklahoma, U.S.
- Spouse: Nedra Funk (divorced)
- Children: 2
- Education: Seattle Pacific University; University of Edinburgh
- Occupation: Businessman, philanthropist, rancher

Robert A. Funk Sr. (May 14, 1940 – July 15, 2025) was an American businessman, philanthropist, and rancher. He co-founded Express Employment Professionals, an employment agency company headquartered in Oklahoma City, and was a cattleman with a global business. A prominent figure in Oklahoma, he was known for his significant contributions to business, agriculture, and community development. Funk served as the chairman of the Federal Reserve Bank of Kansas City from 2006 to 2007 and as chairman of the Conference of Chairmen for the Federal Reserve Bank System in 2007. He owned various enterprises through his Express subsidiaries, including sports teams, and was a philanthropist who sat on the governing boards of several organizations.

== Early life and education ==
Funk was born in Duvall, Washington, on May 14, 1940. Growing up on a small family farm, where he milked cows with his cousin, he developed an early interest in agriculture, entrepreneurship, and religion. His faith was a guiding principle throughout his life, leading him to study for a time as a minister, including six months at a seminary in Scotland.

Funk was an alumnus of Seattle Pacific University and the University of Edinburgh.

== Career ==
=== Express Employment Professionals ===
Before co-founding Express Employment Professionals, Funk was a personnel consultant (1965) and vice president (1975) at ACME Personnel Services.

In 1983, Funk co-founded Express Employment Professionals in Oklahoma City with Bill Stoller and Jim Gray. He served as the company's first CEO for 35 years and remained Executive Chairman of the Board until his death. Under his leadership, the company grew into one of the largest staffing franchisors in the United States. The company has been cited for dozens of serious safety violations and wage infractions.

=== Federal Reserve Bank ===
Funk's background in economic and business matters led to his appointment as Chairman of the Federal Reserve Bank of Kansas City, where he served from 2006 to 2007. In 2007, he also served as Chairman of the Conference of Chairmen for the Federal Reserve Bank System.

=== Express Ranches ===
Funk was a successful cattleman, known globally for his Angus operations. His love of agriculture led him to establish Express Ranches in 1991, which became the largest seedstock cattle operation in the United States. The ranch enterprise, based in Yukon, Oklahoma, was managed for many years by his close friend, the late Jarold Callahan. Funk also established the world-champion Express Clydesdales, which served as a brand ambassador for his company.

=== Public policy and political polling ===
Funk's Express Employment Professionals also conducts polling on public policy issues and political candidates.

== Philanthropy and community involvement ==
Funk was a philanthropist, focusing on youth and agriculture, something he credited to his Christian faith. Thirty years before his death, he founded the Express Ranches Progressive Junior Scholarship Program, which donated $5 million in scholarships to over 500 students. He was a major supporter of the Oklahoma Youth Expo (OYE), where he served as Chair of the Board. His contributions helped fund scholarships, purchase animals, and establish the organization's headquarters at the Oklahoma State Fairgrounds.

Funk was also a major donor to the National Cowboy & Western Heritage Museum in Oklahoma City, where he served as Board Chair. His support included a major donation to the western town exhibit "Prosperity Junction".

== Personal life ==
Funk was a devout Christian and former minister. He had two children, Bob Funk Jr. and Julie Bridges, with his former wife, Nedra Funk. At the time of his death, his companion was Janine Regier.

== Death ==
Funk died at his ranch in Yukon, Oklahoma, on July 15, 2025, at the age of 85. A funeral service was held at Crossings Community Church in Oklahoma City.

== Awards and honors ==
2010 – Inducted into the International Franchise Association Hall of Fame. 2017 – Inducted into the Oklahoma Hall of Fame, the state’s highest honor. 2017 – Inducted into the Staffing 100 Hall of Fame by Staffing Industry Review. 2022 – Inducted into Oklahoma CareerTech Hall of Fame. 2023 – Inducted into the American Staffing Association Hall of Fame. 2023 – Inducted into the Hall of Great Westerners at the National Cowboy & Western Heritage Museum.
