= Francis Tuttle =

American educator (1920–1997)

- Born: Francis Theodore Tuttle; September 5, 1920; Wellston, Oklahoma, U.S.
- Died: February 12, 1997 (aged 76); Stillwater, Oklahoma, U.S.
- Other names: Dr. Tut; Dr. Vo-Tech
- Education: Oklahoma State University (BA); University of Oklahoma (MA)
- Occupation: Educator
- Spouse: Vivian Hughes (m. 1940)
- Children: 3

Francis Theodore "Dr. Tut" Tuttle (September 5, 1920 – February 12, 1997) was an American educator. He is known as the "architect" of vocational-technical schools in the state of Oklahoma.

== Early life and education ==
Francis Theodore Tuttle was born on September 5, 1920, in Wellston, Oklahoma, to parents Amy Franklin and Ira Tuttle. He attended Wellston High School.

He graduated with a B.A. degree in 1942 in agricultural education from Oklahoma State University (OSU); and with a M.A. degree in 1948 in school administration from the University of Oklahoma (OU). During World War II, he served in the Pacific Theater in the United States Army.

== Career ==
Tuttle worked in his early career as vocational teacher in agriculture in Gotebo, Oklahoma, and later in Snyder, Oklahoma. After he graduated from his master's degree, he became the superintendent of schools in Holdenville, Gotebo, and Muskogee.

In 1964, Tuttle became state of Oklahoma's coordinator of the Area Vocational-Technical Schools. He was promoted in 1967, with his appointment as state director of the Oklahoma Department of Vocational and Technical Education, a role he maintained until 1986. He is known as the "architect" of vocational-technical schools in the state of Oklahoma.

After 1986, Tuttle worked as the Oklahoma Secretary of Commerce under Gov. George Nigh.

== Late life, death and honors ==
Tuttle died of cardiac arrest on February 12, 1997, at Stillwater Medical Center in Stillwater, Oklahoma. His memorial was held at First United Methodist Church in Stillwater.

He is the namesake of the Francis Tuttle Vo-Tech Center (now Francis Tuttle Technology Center) in Oklahoma City, and the Francis Tuttle Vo-Tech Foundation Inc..

In 1985, Tuttle was one of the inaugural inductees into the Oklahoma Educators Hall of Fame in recognition of his distinguished career and leadership in education, including his service as State Director of the Oklahoma Department of Vocational-Technical Education from 1967 to 1985 and his status as a pioneer in career and technical education in Oklahoma.

In 1990, Tuttle was inducted into the Oklahoma CareerTech Hall of Fame as a member of its inaugural class, honoring his foundational leadership and lasting contributions to Oklahoma's career and technical education system.

In 2015, Theodore Tuttle was inducted into the Oklahoma Hall of Fame as a member of the class of 2015, in recognition of his contributions to career and technical education in Oklahoma.

In February 2023, the Oklahoma State Department of Education's Educators Hall of Fame had images removed by the Oklahoma Superintendent of Public Instruction Ryan Walters, this included the images of Tuttle, Frederick Douglass Moon, and Joy Hofmeister. Walters claimed that the images were removed because the state does not want to highlight "union leaders and association heads".
