= Oklahoma Department of Career and Technology Education =

Government agency

Coordinates: 36.11520°N 97.07741°W

- Great Seal of Oklahoma

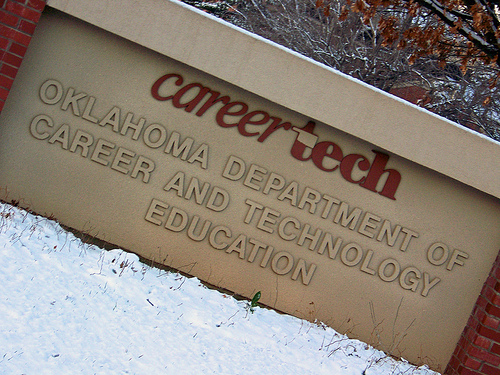

Agency overview
- Formed: 1929
- Preceding agency: Department of Vocational and Technical Education
- Headquarters: 1500 W Seventh Avenue Stillwater, Oklahoma
- Employees: 259 unclassified
- Annual budget: $175 million
- Ministers responsible: Lindel Fields, Chairman of the Board
- Agency executive: Brent Haken, State Director
- Parent agency: Board of Career and Technology Education
- Website: www.okcareertech.org

The Oklahoma Department of Career and Technology Education (ODCTE, commonly known and branded as CareerTech) is an agency of the state of Oklahoma located in Stillwater, Oklahoma.

CareerTech oversees a statewide system of career and technology education. The system comprises 29 technology center districts and 395 comprehensive school districts. CareerTech also has skills centers that serve state correctional facilities and juvenile detention facilities. The State Board of Career and Technology Education is the governing body of the department, composed of the Oklahoma State Superintendent of Public Instruction and eight members appointed by the governor of Oklahoma with the approval of the Oklahoma Senate. The board appoints the director of career and technology education, who serves as the chief executive officer of the department and serves as a nonvoting member of the state board.

In November 2022, Brent Haken became the system's ninth state director.

Together with the Oklahoma State Department of Education and the Oklahoma State Regents for Higher Education, the department forms the core of Oklahoma's public education system.

== History ==
The Oklahoma CareerTech System began with the passing of the Smith-Hughes Act of 1917 by President Woodrow Wilson. This act made available federal money for the promotion of vocational education. In 1929, the Division of Vocational Education was established as part of the State Department of Education. The department moved from Oklahoma City to Stillwater in 1932, and in 1941, the state legislature established the position of state director of vocational education. J.B Perky was the first director. In 1966, Oklahoma technology center school districts were formed, and in 1967, Tri County Tech became the state's first area vocational-technical school. On July 1, 1968, the Oklahoma State Board of Vocational and Technical Education was established as a separate entity from the State Department of Education. In 1971, the first delivery of training to inmates in a Skills Center at the Ouachita facility took place.

On May 19, 2000, Governor of Oklahoma Frank Keating signed House Bill 2128, which officially and immediately changed its name to the Department of Career and Technology Education.

== Economic impact ==
Recent Census Bureau survey data indicate that Oklahoma workers who have completed the equivalent of a two-year program with a vocational or occupational emphasis earned 20 percent more than workers with only high school diplomas the past two decades. These income gains can in turn contribute significantly to the overall level of income statewide. Over the work life, a typical career major completer can expect to add more than $475,000, or $188,000 in current dollars, to lifetime earnings relative to completing no additional education beyond high school.

In current dollars, the direct benefits are $1.84 billion in future income gains to completers, $138 million in added tax revenue to state and local government, and direct in-state spending of $185 million for the delivery of the career major instructional programs statewide. Indirect benefits include $1.66 billion in estimated spillover income gains to the broader state economy which in turn produce $124 million in tax revenue.

== Leadership ==
The department is led by the state director and the CareerTech board. Brent Haken serves as the state director.

=== Board of Career and Technology Education ===
The State Board of Career and Technology Education is a nine-member board composed of the Oklahoma superintendent of public instruction (who serves as the chairman of the board), two members of the Oklahoma State Board of Education, one member from each of the state's congressional districts and one at-large member.

All members, except ex officio members, are appointed by the governor of Oklahoma and confirmed by the Oklahoma Senate.

As of 2025, the chairman is Lindel Fields, Oklahoma superintendent of public instruction.

Current members are Brian Bobek, Michael Brown, Ryan Deatherage, Peter Dillingham, Randy Gilbert, Shaelynn Haning, Leonard McCullough and Rob Seeman.

== Organization ==
- Board of Career and Technology Education
  - Director
  - All Agency Divisions
    - Accreditation
    - Adult Education and Family Literacy
    - Agricultural Education
    - American Rescue Plan Act
    - Business, Marketing and Information Technology Education
    - Business and Industry
    - CareerTech Skills Centers
    - CareerTech Testing Center
    - Communications and Marketing
    - Counseling and Career Development
    - Curriculum
    - Education Support Services
    - Facility Services
    - Family and Consumer Sciences Education
    - Federal Legislation Assistance
    - Financial Services
    - Health Careers Education
    - Human Resources
    - Information Management
    - Jobs for America's Graduates
    - Leadership and Professional Development
    - Office of Management and Enterprise Services
    - Oklahoma APEX Accelerator
    - Perkins Administration
    - Printing, Distribution and Client Services
    - Resource Center for CareerTech Advancement
    - Science, Technology, Engineering and Mathematics Education
    - Temporary Assistance for Needy Families
    - Trade and Industrial Education
    - Work-Based Learning
    - Workforce and Economic Development

== Hall of Fame ==
The Oklahoma Foundation for Career and Technology Education supports the Oklahoma CareerTech Hall of Fame. The award is given to individuals who, through their outstanding professional and personal achievements, have brought honor and distinction to career and technology education in Oklahoma.

== Technology Centers ==
CareerTech Centers in Oklahoma provide career and technology education for high school students in the U.S. state of Oklahoma. An elected local board governs each technology center.

- Autry Technology Center

Enid Campus

- Caddo-Kiowa Technology Center

Fort Cobb Campus

- Canadian Valley Technology Center

Chickasha Campus
Cowan Campus
El Reno Campus

- Central Technology Center

Drumright Campus
Sapulpa Campus

- Chisholm Trail Technology Center

Omega Campus

- Eastern Oklahoma County Technology Center

Choctaw Campus

- Francis Tuttle Technology Center

Danforth Campus
Portland Campus
Reno Campus
Rockwell Campus

- Gordon Cooper Technology Center

Shawnee Campus
Aviation Campus
Seminole Campus

- Great Plains Technology Center

Frederick Campus
Lawton Campus

- Green Country Technology Center

Okmulgee Campus

- High Plains Technology Center

Woodward Campus

- Indian Capital Technology Center

Coweta Campus
Muskogee Campus
Sallisaw Campus
Stilwell Campus
Tahlequah Campus

- Kiamichi Technology Centers

Antlers Campus
Atoka Campus
Durant Campus
Hugo Campus
Idabel Campus
McAlester Campus
Poteau Campus
Spiro Campus
Stigler Campus
Talihina Campus
Wilburton Campus

- Meridian Technology Center

Main Campus
South Campus

- Metro Technology Centers

Aviation Center
South Bryant Campus
Springlake Campus

- Mid-America Technology Center

Wayne Campus

- Mid-Del Technology Center

Midwest City Campus
Tinker Training Center

- Moore Norman Technology Center

Norman Campus
South Penn Campus

- Northeast Technology Center

Afton Campus
Claremore Campus
Kansas Campus
Pryor Campus

- Northwest Technology Center

Alva Campus
Fairview Campus

- Pioneer Technology Center

Ponca City Campus

- Pontotoc Technology Center

Ada Campus

- Red River Technology Center

Duncan Campus

- Southern Technology Center

Ardmore Campus

- Southwest Technology Center

Altus Campus

- Tri County Technology Center

Bartlesville Campus

- Tulsa Technology Center

Broken Arrow Campus
Lemley Memorial Campus

-Health Sciences Center
-Client Service Center
-Industry Training Center

Owasso Campus
Peoria Campus
Riverside Campus
Sand Springs Campus

- Wes Watkins Technology Center

Wetumka Campus

- Western Technology Center

Burns Flat Campus
Elk City Campus
Hobart Campus
Sayre Campus
Weatherford Campus

=== College Credit ===
Transcribed college credit is available for high school and adult students enrolled at CareerTech Centers through the Cooperative Alliance Program for certain technical courses. The Cooperative Alliances potentially save students time and money. The Cooperative Alliances are a partnership of CareerTech and the Oklahoma State Regents for Higher Education.

=== OSSM ===
The Oklahoma School of Science and Mathematics has 12 branches on CareerTech campuses with primary focus on the Calculus BC, Physics C and Mechanics AP Exams.

== Student organizations ==
CareerTech has several co-curricular Career and Technical Student Organizations:

- Business Professionals of America (business and information technology education)
- DECA (formerly Distributive Education Clubs of America) (marketing education)
- Family, Career and Community Leaders of America (family and consumer sciences education)
- National FFA Organization (formerly Future Farmers of America) (agricultural education)
- SkillsUSA (trade and industrial education)
- Technology Student Association (science, technology, engineering and mathematics)
- HOSA (formerly Health Occupation Students of America) (health careers education)

Other CareerTech student organizations include the following:

- National Technical Honor Society
- FIRST Robotics Competition

== Skills Centers ==
The Skills Centers began operations in February 1971. The system began at the Jim E. Hamilton CareerTech Skills Center inside the Jim E. Hamilton (formerly Ouachita) Correctional Center at Hodgen, Oklahoma. Currently the CTSC has campuses in state correctional facilities and a juvenile detention facility.

Female

- Eddie Warrior Correctional Center, Taft
- Mabel Bassett Correctional Center, McLoud

Male

- Bill Johnson Correctional Center, Alva
- Enid Community Corrections Center, Enid
- Howard McLeod Correctional Center, Atoka
- Jackie Brannon Correctional Center, McAlester
- James Crabtree Correctional Center, Helena
- Jess Dunn Correctional Center, Taft
- Jim E. Hamilton Correctional Center, Hodgen
- J.H. Lilley Correctional Center, Boley
- Lexington Assessment and Reception Center, Lexington
- Northeast Oklahoma Community Corrections Center, Vinita
- Oklahoma State Reformatory, Granite

Juvenile

- Central Oklahoma Juvenile Center, Tecumseh
- Scissortail Landing Juvenile Center, Norman

== Notable graduates ==
- Jennifer Berry — Jenks DECA and FCCLA, Miss America 2006
- Lindel Fields — Tulsa Technology Center horticulture graduate, retired superintendent and CEO of Tri County Technology Center, Oklahoma Superintendent of Public Instruction 2025-present
- Brad Henry — Shawnee FFA, former governor of Oklahoma
- Kyle Hilbert — Depew FFA, Speaker of the Oklahoma House of Representatives 2025-present
- Gabriel Lewis — Francis Tuttle Technology Center, contestant on MasterChef (American TV series) seasons 8 and 12
- Danny Sterling — Noble FFA, former agricultural education teacher in Tecumseh, Oklahoma, member of the Oklahoma House of Representatives 2018-present

== See also ==
- Oklahoma Tech Prep
- Oklahoma CareerTech Hall of Fame
