= Rogers State University =

Public university in Claremore, Oklahoma, U.S.

Coordinates: 36°19′09″N 95°38′21″W

- Former names: Eastern University Preparatory School (1909–1917); Oklahoma Military Academy (1919–1971); Claremore Junior College (1971–1982); Rogers State College (1982–1996); Rogers University (1996–1998)
- Motto: Tradition Innovation Excellence
- Type: Public university
- Established: 1909
- Affiliations: Board of Regents of the University of Oklahoma
- President: Don Raleigh
- Students: 3,200
- Location: Claremore, Oklahoma, U.S.
- Campus: Suburban
- Colors: Navy and red
- Nickname: Hillcats
- Sporting affiliations: NCAA Division II – The MIAA
- Mascot: Hunter the Hillcat
- Website: www.rsu.edu

Rogers State University (RSU) is a public university in Claremore, Oklahoma, United States. It also has branch campuses in Bartlesville and Pryor Creek.

== History ==
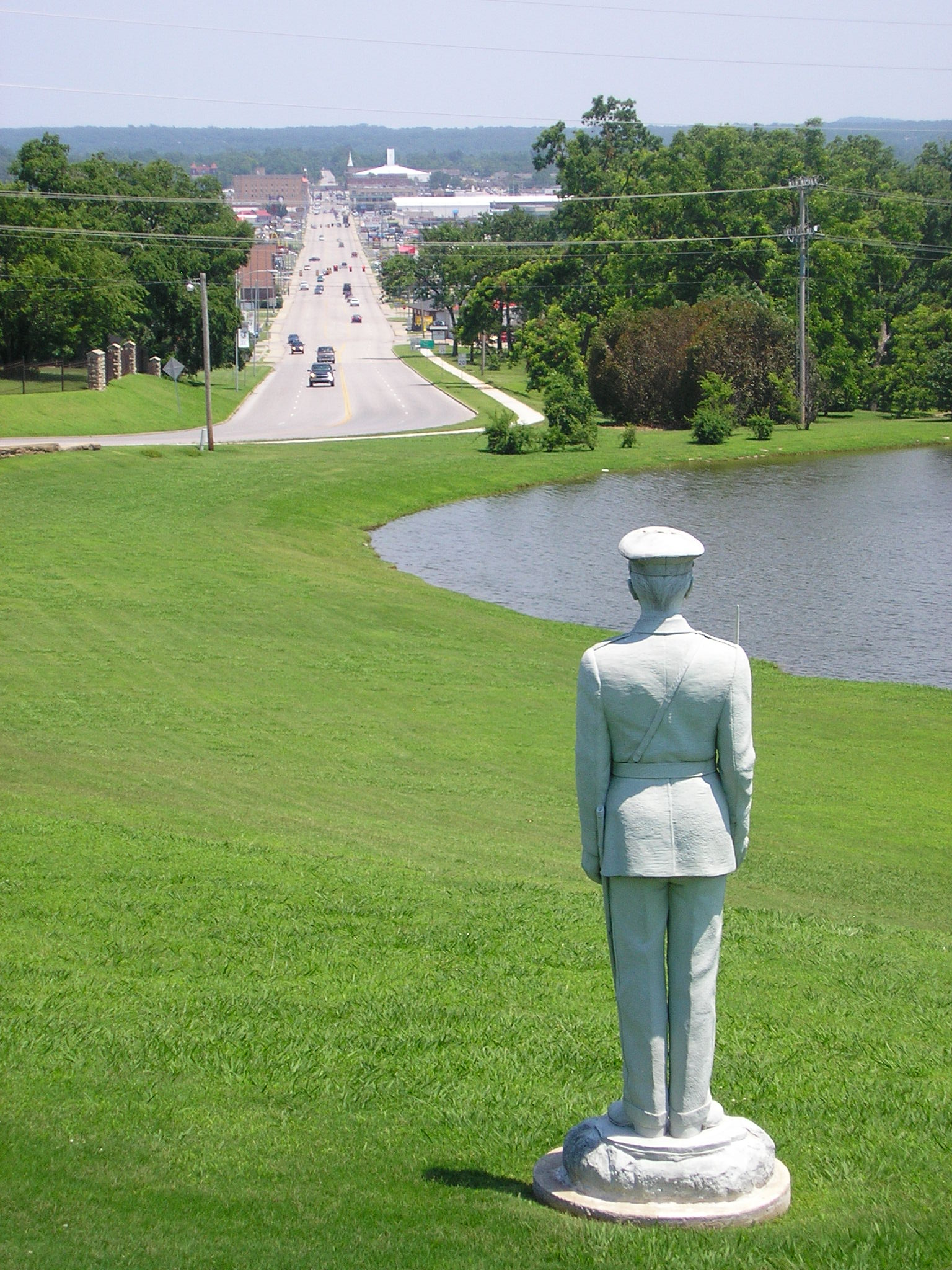
A statue of a soldier dating from RSU's time as Oklahoma Military Academy overlooks Claremore from the school's entrance.

The institution that is now RSU has gone through several stages, from its foundation as a state-sponsored preparatory school to its transition to a military academy, and finally to its current incarnation as a four-year regional university.

It has its roots in the Eastern University Preparatory School, which was founded in 1909. During the construction of the famous "Preparatory Hall", Eastern University Preparatory School held its classes in the old Claremont building until 1911. The institution was closed in 1917.

In 1919 it was restarted as the Oklahoma Military Academy (OMA), to meet the growing educational and training needs of the United States armed forces. In 1923 it became a six-year program, providing a high school and junior college education. The school received an Army ROTC Honor School rating in 1932, and the junior college division became fully accredited in 1950. Graduates of the program became second lieutenants in the United States Army Reserve; more than 2,500 OMA graduates served in the military, and more than 100 alumni died serving their country during World War II, the Korean War and the Vietnam War.

OMA's enrollment declined during the later 1960s, due in part to the unpopularity of the Vietnam War, and in 1971, the Oklahoma Legislature replaced OMA with an institution to grant two-year associate degrees to the public known as Claremore Junior College. In 1982, it became Rogers State College, named after Rogers County where the main campus is located; the county in turn is named in honor of Clement Vann Rogers, not Clem's son, Will Rogers. In 1996, Rogers State College and the University Center at Tulsa (UCAT)–an extension center operated by the University of Oklahoma, Oklahoma State University, Northeastern State University and Langston University–merged to form Rogers University, with campuses in Claremore and Tulsa. The merged school operated for two years before being separated by the state Legislature. The Tulsa campus–the former University Center–became Oklahoma State University–Tulsa. The Claremore campus–the former Rogers State College–became a member of the OU Board of Regents and was renamed Rogers State University. RSU was given permission to seek accreditation as a four-year, bachelor's-degree-granting university. In 2000, RSU became the institution it is today, a public four-year, residential university.

On August 16, 2006, Rogers State's Stratton Taylor Library was named a Federal depository library, the 20th in the state of Oklahoma.

The university celebrated its centennial anniversary in 2009 with a series of special events, lectures and celebrations, culminating with the dedication of the Centennial Center building that serves as a student services center. In 2005, RSU acquired a historic nine-story building to serve as its campus in downtown Bartlesville and the facility is a major anchor in the downtown Bartlesville redevelopment. In 2014, RSU celebrated the opening of its new Pryor campus at the MidAmerica Industrial Park in Mayes County, Oklahoma. The $10 million construction project and 83-acre site were provided to the university by the Oklahoma Ordnance Works Authority, which operates the park as a public trust. The donation represents the largest gift in the university's history.

== Academics ==
Undergraduate demographics as of Fall 2023
Race and ethnicity	Total
White	48%
American Indian/Alaska Native	19%
Two or more races	13%
Hispanic	8%
Black	4%
International student	3%
Asian	2%
Unknown	2%
Economic diversity
Low-income (Note: The percentage of students who received an income-based federal Pell grant intended for low-income students.)	45%
Affluent (Note: The percentage of students who are a part of the American middle class at the bare minimum.)	55%

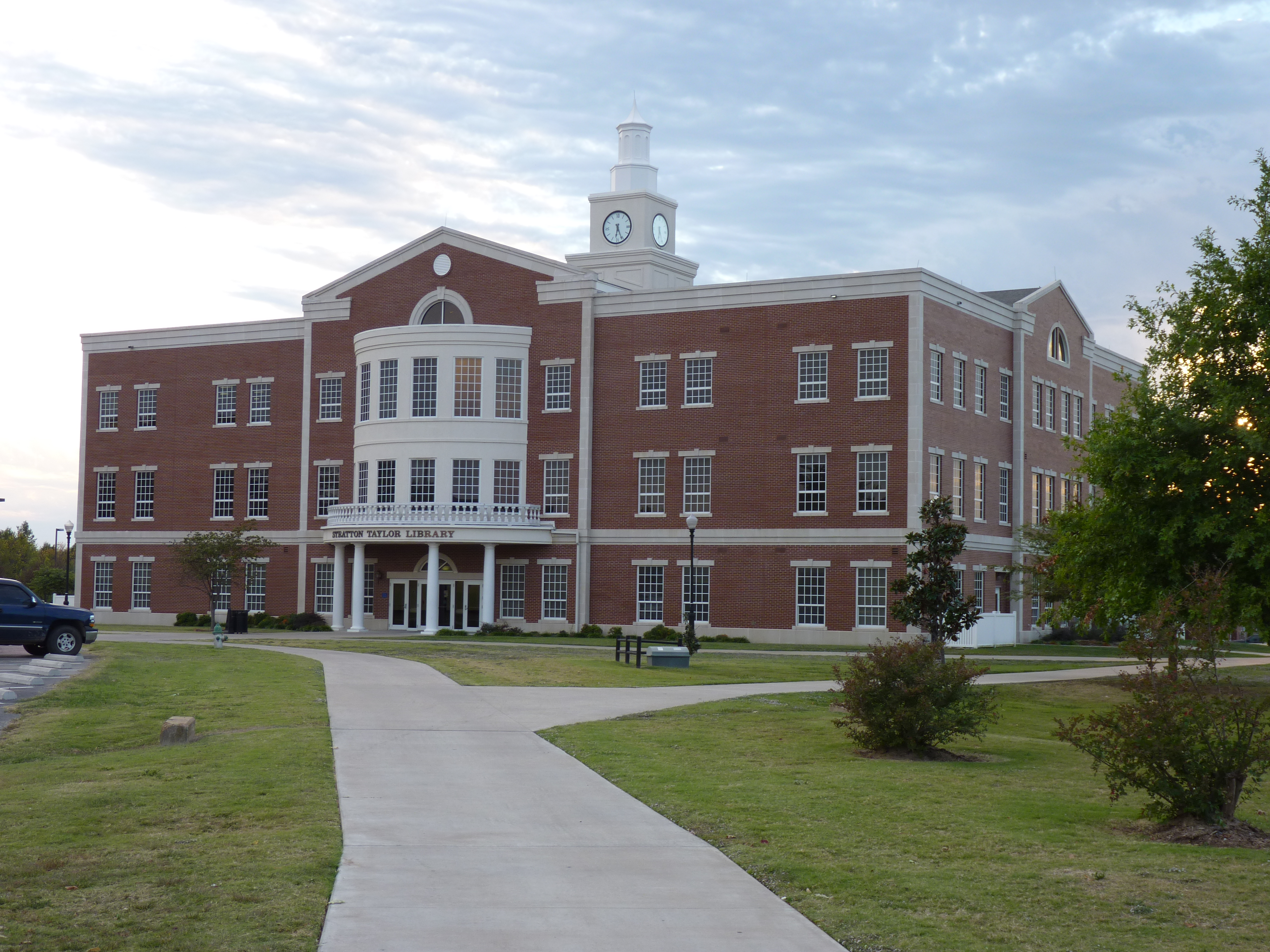
Stratton Taylor Library

RSU currently offers Master's degrees in 5 disciplines, bachelor's degrees in 22 disciplines, and associate degrees in 12 disciplines. RSU also offers an Elementary Education program designed to prepare students for teaching licensure in Oklahoma through flexible on-ground, hybrid, and online coursework. Numerous degrees are available completely online, including 17 bachelor's degree options, nine associate degree options, and four master's degrees.

== Athletics ==
The Rogers State athletic teams are called the Hillcats. The university is a member of the NCAA Division II ranks, primarily competing in the Mid-America Intercollegiate Athletics Association (MIAA) for most of its sports as an associate member since the 2019–20 academic year (before achieving full member status in 2022–23); while its men's soccer team competes in the Great American Conference (GAC). The Hillcats previously competed in the D-II Heartland Conference from 2013–14 to 2018–19; and in the Sooner Athletic Conference (SAC) of the National Association of Intercollegiate Athletics (NAIA) from 2007–08 to 2012–13.

Rogers State competes in 12 intercollegiate varsity sports: Men's sports include baseball, basketball, cross country, golf, soccer and track & field; women's sports include basketball, cross country, golf, soccer, softball and track & field.

=== Mascot ===
Hunter the Hillcat, a fictional animal based on a bobcat, is the official mascot of Rogers State University in Claremore, Oklahoma. First conceived by RSU students in 2005, Hunter was approved by the university’s mascot committee and officially unveiled to the public on September 13 of that year. As a symbol of school spirit, Hunter plays a major role in energizing campus life. He appears at athletic events, student activities, university celebrations, and community gatherings, helping to build pride and unity among students, alumni, and supporters. Hunter is widely recognized as a core part of RSU’s brand and traditions.

Over the years, Hunter the Hillcat has been celebrated through campus events, including birthday celebrations marking milestones since his debut. His presence continues to represent the enthusiasm, determination, and community spirit that define Rogers State University.

Sarge is a swan that arrived to campus in 2010, and became part of Rogers State University’s campus traditions. Originally the lone swan on campus, he was named through a student poll, with “Sarge” honoring the university’s history as the Oklahoma Military Academy. As RSU’s unofficial mascot, Sarge remains a recognizable symbol of campus life and tradition. He is often seen on his pond near Herrington Hall or mingling with students around the DCTC Building.

=== Athletic director ===
Wren Baker, current vice president and director of athletics for the West Virginia Mountaineers, served as the first director of athletics at RSU. After his departure to Northwest Missouri State for a similar position Baker was replaced by Ryan Bradley, previously the associate athletic director for external relations. Bradley departed for the University of Memphis to work for Baker, then deputy athletic director for the Tigers.

In 2013, Ryan Erwin joined Rogers State as the director of athletics from Dallas Baptist University. On August 1, 2016, Erwin announced his resignation to accept the vice president and director of athletics position at East Texas Baptist University (NCAA D-III). On November 18, 2016, President Dr. Larry Rice announced that Chris Ratcliff, director of athletics at the University of Arkansas - Monticello, would assume the role of director of athletics.

=== Accomplishments ===
- The Hillcats' women's softball team became the first RSU athletic team to be nationally ranked on March 28, 2007, entering the NAIA softball ratings at No. 22.
- The men's basketball team earned the school's first number one ranking on January 26, 2009.
- On May 31, 2022, the Hillcats' women's softball team won the NCAA Div II National Championship in Denver, Colorado.
- On September, 13th, 2025 RSU Communications Department Showcases Excellence at OSTCA 2025 Conference.
- On September, 23rd, 2025 Rogers State University Ranked in Top 10 ‘Best Colleges’ by U.S. News and World Report.
- On October 13th, 2025, RSU’s cybersecurity team – CyberCats – has received a top national ranking by the National Cyber League (NCL) following its performance in the Fall 2025 NCL competition.

== Media ==
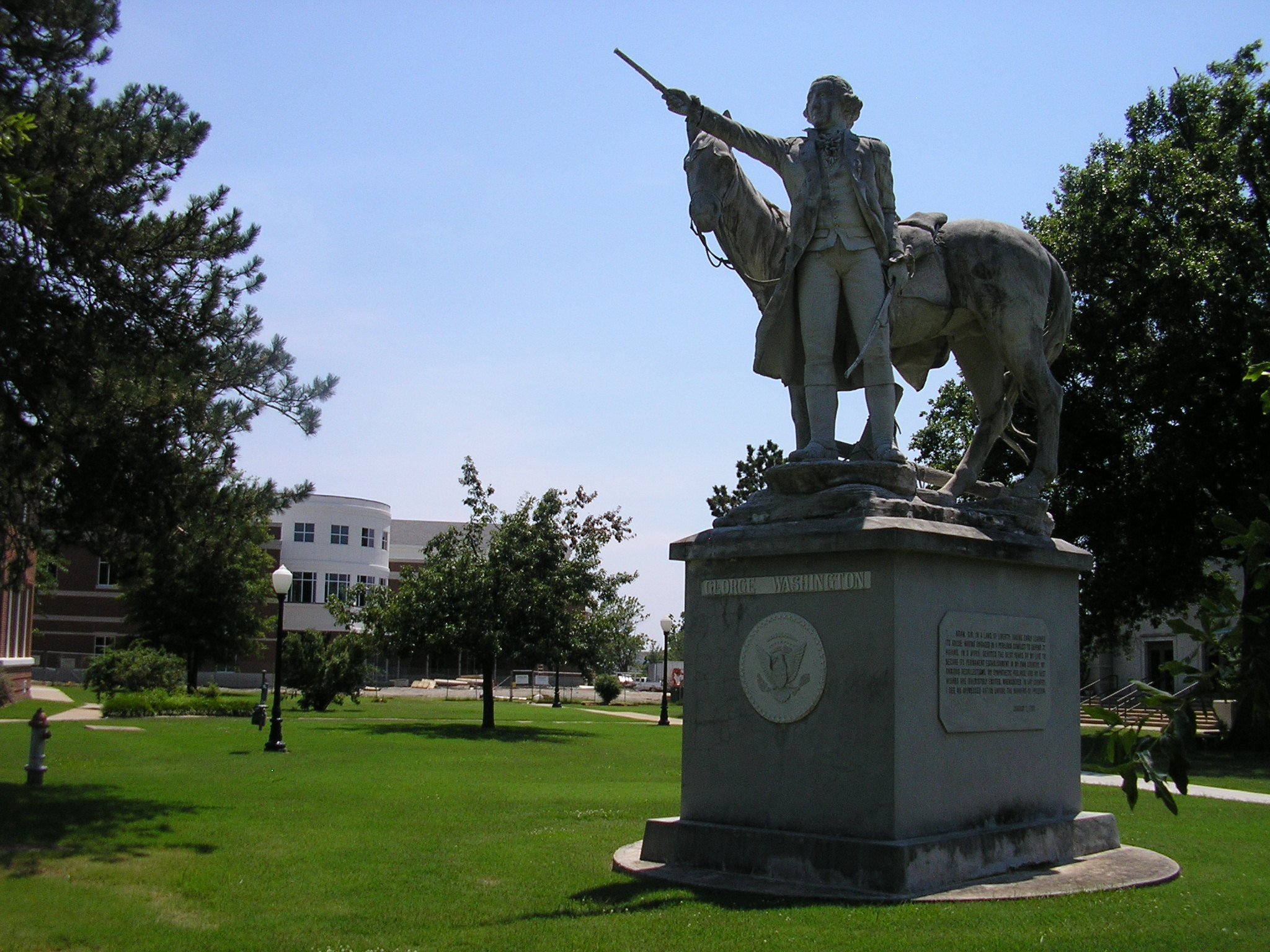
A sculpture of George Washington is part of a collection of statues depicting U.S. Presidents on RSU's grounds.

RSU's radio station, KRSC, is broadcast on 91.3 FM and over the Internet. It began in 1980 as a 10-watt station, and is now 3000 watts, reaching an audience of more than 1.2 million in northeastern Oklahoma. The station's programming consists mainly of indie rock and pop, with specialty rock, blues, punk and Native American music shows. KRSC also provides coverage of Hillcat basketball, baseball and softball. The station is staffed by students, faculty and area media personalities. KRSC broadcasts 24 hours a day, seven days a week. The facilities are in Markham Hall.

RSU's television station, KRSU-TV 35, is the only full-powered public station licensed to a public university in the state. It broadcasts cultural and educational programming 24 hours a day. The station is also carried on local cable systems and is available on Cox Cable Channel 19 in Claremore and Tulsa. The station is home to many telecourses and interactive courses, part of RSU's distance-learning programs. It also produces in-house documentaries and regular programming. It is operated by a paid staff, with assistance from RSU students. The station reaches an audience of 1.2 million in the northeastern Oklahoma and southeastern Kansas areas.

The independent student newspaper The Hillpost was originally established as a print newspaper in 2009 and re-established as an online news publication in 2020. It was produced in collaboration with the Claremore Daily Progress which allowed the student editors to print their newspaper for distribution on all three of Rogers State University's campuses and allowed for the newspaper to be inserted within regular issues of the Claremore Daily Progress.

== Greek life ==
Rogers State University hosts two sororities: the Epsilon Delta chapter of Alpha Sigma Tau, initiated in November 2005, and the Theta Eta chapter of Alpha Sigma Alpha.

In early 2023, the Oklahoma Epsilon chapter of Phi Delta Theta was inducted, marking the establishment of the first official fraternity at Rogers State University.

Although there were emerging chapters of Kappa Sigma and Tau Kappa Epsilon on campus, they are presently inactive.

== Controversy ==
In 2003, then Rogers State University President Joe Wiley was sued by a former university employee. Former university controller Ryan Parris alleged he was terminated for not approving travel claims. In the lawsuit, Parris claimed he was pressured to approve non-business travel as university expenses and refused to do so. Parris alleged that both Wiley and the university's vice president for business affairs attempted to coerce him. Parris later claimed that falsified documents were submitted.

In 2004, a student club at Rogers State University encountered issues in organizing on campus. According to the Foundation for Individual Rights in Education, the Organization for Advocating the Rights of Students experienced "administrative restrictions" while attempting to organize and promote itself on campus. Former RSU student and club member Renee Morse-Heenan established the club after observing what she called a "culture of fear" at the institution. The student club was later officially recognized by the university and an administrator left from their position.

Previously, Rogers State University operated an equine-assisted therapy program on its campus. In 2004, the university stated its intentions to begin a $2 million capital campaign to support the program. That year, a local resident, Wanda Sanders, donated 20 acres to support the program and later gave an additional 40 acres four years later. In a lawsuit filed in 2017, Sanders alleged that the land donations were not used to their donated intent and that university transferred the land to another organization in 2013. The land was then sold, again, to the university's foundation, a separate, tax-exempt organization. The university later attempted to mediate the lawsuit in 2017.
