= Carl Albert State College =

Community college in Poteau, Oklahoma, US

Coordinates: 35°02′20″N 94°38′06″W

- Former name: Poteau Community College
- Type: Public community college
- Established: 1933
- President: Jay Falkner
- Students: 1,786 (fall 2023)
- Location: Poteau, Oklahoma, U.S.
- Campus: Rural
- Colors: Blue and white
- Sporting affiliations: NJCAA Division I
- Mascot: Vikings
- Website: www.carlalbert.edu

Carl Albert State College (CASC) is a public community college with its main campus in Poteau, Oklahoma. Originally named Poteau Junior College, it was founded in 1933, and its name changed to Poteau Community College in the early 1950s. In 1971, it was renamed in honor of then-Speaker of the House Carl Albert. Its primary campus is in Poteau but it has a smaller campus in Sallisaw, Oklahoma. It enrolls approximately 2,400 students annually.

== Academics ==
The college offers over 28 different academic degree programs, both terminal and transfer. Many degree programs may be completed 100% online.

== Student life ==
There are eight dormitories and over 31 student-run organizations. Students are given free high speed internet access as well as free access to the school's computer Lab

== Athletics ==
The school's sports teams are called the Vikings. The mascot had been the Trojans for some time until the early 1990s when the switch was made. The school engages in collegiate baseball, softball, wrestling, cross country, and e-sports.

== See also ==
- Carl Albert
- Community college
- Eastern Oklahoma State College
- Heavener Runestone
- List of colleges and universities in Oklahoma
- Murray State College
- Poteau, Oklahoma
