= Redlands Community College =

College in El Reno, Oklahoma, U.S.

Coordinates: 35°31′09″N 97°58′28″W

- Type: Public community college
- Established: 1938
- Academic affiliations: Space-grant
- President: Jena Nelson
- Undergraduates: 1,895 (fall 2023)
- Location: El Reno, Oklahoma, United States
- Mascot: Cougars
- Website: www.redlandscc.edu

Redlands Community College (Redlands), originally El Reno Junior College, is a public community college in El Reno, Oklahoma. Student enrollment is approximately 2,200 per semester.

== History ==
In 1938, El Reno Junior College was established by an act of the El Reno Board of Education fostered by a petition signed by El Reno High School graduates' parents. In 1938 the State Junior College Committee, University of Oklahoma, and Oklahoma State University accredited the college for one year of higher education and in 1939 it received accreditation as a two-year institution. Fifty-four students enrolled in the college's first year, and in 1940, the first graduating class consisted of eight students.

In 1938, El Reno Junior College was the only Oklahoma municipal junior college to publish a year book entitled The Collegian. From 1940 to 1941, it provided civilian pilot training with the U.S. Army Air Corps. Aircraft and engine mechanics was taught from 1946 and 1947 at El Reno's Mustang Field in a subsidiary school known as the Midwest School of Aeronautics.

From 1938 to 1966, classes were held in the basement of El Reno High School. In 1966 the college was located in an old post office at Rogers and Bickford streets. In 1971, construction began on its current location at 1300 South Country Club Road. The campus has grown to encompass seven major building complexes situated on thirty-seven acres.

In 1974, the college became a full member of the Oklahoma State System of Higher Education. On September 1, 1991, the name was officially changed to Redlands Community College.
