= Tulsa Community College =

College in Tulsa, Oklahoma, U.S.

Coordinates: 36°8′52″N 95°59′10″W

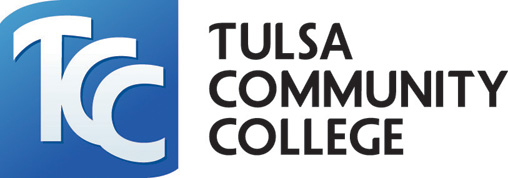
- Former name: Tulsa Junior College
- Motto: Building success through education
- Type: Public community college
- Established: 1970; 56 years ago
- Founder: Oklahoma Legislature
- Accreditation: HLC
- Affiliations: Tulsa Higher Ed Consortium
- Academic affiliations: Space-grant
- President: Dr. Leigh B. Goodson
- Students: 17,211 (fall 2026)
- Location: Tulsa, Oklahoma, United States
- Campus: Urban
- Colors: TCC Blue
- Mascot: Blue the Goose
- Website: www.tulsacc.edu

Tulsa Community College is a public community college in Tulsa, Oklahoma. It was founded in 1970 and is the largest two-year college in Oklahoma. It serves approximately 23,000 students per year in classes. TCC consists of four main campuses, two community campuses, and a conference center situated throughout the Tulsa metropolitan area with an annual budget of approximately $112 million. The college employs about 2,270 people, including 280 full-time faculty and 536 adjunct faculty. In 2022, the Tulsa Community College established the Cyber Skills Center as a part of its workforce development initiatives. The center, supported by the George Kaiser Family Foundation, focuses on building a diverse tech workforce in the Tulsa area.

== Historic presence ==
TCC serves more Oklahomans than any other college in the state and is the third largest in the state. TCC is part of the Tulsa Higher Ed consortium. Tulsa, the state's second largest city, had no publicly-funded university presence before 1986, when University Center at Tulsa, or UCAT was formed. It was composed of Oklahoma State University (OSU), Langston University, the University of Oklahoma (OU) and Northeastern State University (NSU). It has since dissolved and programs like College Park have replaced it. That partnership includes Tulsa Community College (TCC), which provides students who want to stay in Tulsa with a seamless four-year university transfer experience from TCC to OSU. The University of Tulsa (TU), one of the city’s principal universities, is a private institution and not publicly funded, unlike major universities in similar-sized metro areas. Efforts have been made to try to get a four-year university in the area. Because of the competition from outside university satellite campuses, TCC has said it may start offering bachelor's degrees.

In 2025, TCC announced a partnership with Pawnee Nation College for as long as it took to gain accreditation. The collaboration is meant to "last at least three years and will help Pawnee Nation College get closer to becoming accredited on its own."

== Notable alumni ==
- AleXa - K-pop idol under ZB Label
- Chris Benge - Executive Director, Rural and Tribal Health Policy, OSU Center for Health Sciences
- Randy Blake - basketball player; professional kickboxer
- Shelly Crow (1948–2011), Second Chief of the Muscogee Nation from 1992-1996
- Jeannie McDaniel - Retired Legislator
- Rebecca Petty - Republican member of the Arkansas House of Representatives from Rogers, Arkansas
- Barbara Starr Scott (1939–2020), Cherokee Nation tribal councilor (1983–1987, 1995–1999)
- Wes Studi - Cherokee American Film Actor and Producer
- Clifton Taulbert - President & CEO, The Freemount Corporation
