= List of CareerTech centers in Oklahoma =

Technology Centers, in Oklahoma, are Career and Technical schools which provide career and technology education for high school students in the U.S. state of Oklahoma. The students generally spend part of each day in their respective schools pursuing academic subjects in addition to attending classes in their affiliated vo-tech center. Technology centers are managed by the Oklahoma Department of Career and Technology Education in Stillwater, Oklahoma.

== List of centers ==
- Autry Technology Center
- Caddo-Kiowa Technology Center
- Canadian Valley Technology Center

Chickasha Campus
El Reno Campus

- Central Technology Center

Sapulpa Campus
Drumright Campus

- Chisholm Trail Technology Center (Omega, Ok)
- Eastern Oklahoma County Technology Center
- Francis Tuttle Technology Center

Portland Campus
Reno Campus
Rockwell Campus
Danforth Campus

- Gordon Cooper Technology Center
- Great Plains Technology Center

Tillman-Kiowa Campus (Frederick, Ok)
Lawton Campus

- Green Country Technology Center
- High Plains Technology Center
- Indian Capital Technology Center

Bill Willis Campus
Muskogee Campus
Sallisaw Campus
Stilwell Campus

- Kiamichi Technology Center

Atoka Campus
Durant Campus
Hugo Campus
Idabel Campus
McAlester Campus
Poteau Campus
Spiro Campus
Stigler Campus
Talihina Campus

- Meridian Technology Center

Main Campus (Stillwater, OK)
South Campus (Guthrie, OK)

- Metro Technology Centers

Aviation Career Center
Downtown Business Campus
South Bryant Campus
Springlake Campus

- Mid-America Technology Center
- Mid-Del Technology Center
- Moore Norman Technology Center

Franklin Road Campus
South Penn Campus

- Northeast Technology Center

East Campus
North Campus
South Campus

- Northwest Technology Center

Alva Campus
Fairview Campus

- Pioneer Technology Center (Ponca City, Ok)
- Pontotoc Technology Center
- Red River Technology Center
- Southern Oklahoma Technology Center
- Southwest Technology Center
- Tri County Technology Center
- Tulsa Technology Center

Broken Arrow Campus
Career Services Center
Lemley Campus
Peoria Campus
Riverside Campus
Training Center

- Wes Watkins Technology Center
- Western Technology Center

Burns Flat Campus
Hobart
Sayre Campus
Weatherford Campus

== See also ==
- List of school districts in Oklahoma
- List of private schools in Oklahoma
- List of colleges and universities in Oklahoma
