= Oklahoma State University Institute of Technology =

Public university in Okmulgee, Oklahoma, U.S.

Coordinates: 35.627814°N 95.940367°W

- Type: Public institute of technology
- Established: 1946
- Provost: Randy Wymore
- Undergraduates: 3,000
- Location: Okmulgee, Oklahoma, U.S.
- Campus: Rural
- Website: osuit.edu

Oklahoma State University Institute of Technology (OSUIT) is a public institute of technology in Okmulgee, Oklahoma, United States. It is part of the Oklahoma State University System. OSUIT has 37 programs of study which include 31 programs of study towards an Associate in Applied Science degree, 4 programs towards an Associate in Science transfer degree, and 3 programs towards Bachelor of Technology degrees.

== History ==
Undergraduate demographics as of Fall 2023
Race and ethnicity	Total
White	55%
Two or more races	15%
American Indian/Alaska Native	13%
Hispanic	9%
Black	5%
Asian	1%
International student	1%
Economic diversity
Low-income (Note: The percentage of students who received an income-based federal Pell grant intended for low-income students.)	46%
Affluent (Note: The percentage of students who are a part of the American middle class at the bare minimum.)	54%

Before Oklahoma statehood, the site of the school had served as a Creek Nation orphanage from 1892 to 1906. In 1943 the United States Army acquired the site to serve under the jurisdiction of Camp Gruber as Glennan General Hospital, initially intended for U.S. troops but subsequently designated as a facility for treating prisoners of war (mainly Germans) captured in North Africa and elsewhere. After World War II ended, Oklahoma A&M acquired the camp and converted it into a branch campus, whose initial emphasis was vocational training for veterans, both male and female. The school has seen several name changes and received its current name in 2008.

=== Leadership ===
1946-1963	L. Keith Covelle	Director
1963-1983	Wayne W. Miller	Director
1983-2011	Robert E. Klabenes	President
2011–2023	Bill R. Path	President
2024-present	Randy Wymore	Provost

=== Institution names ===
Names of the institution have included:

1946-1957	Oklahoma A. and M. College School of Technical Training
1957-1986	Oklahoma State University School of Technical Training
1986-1990	Oklahoma State University Technical Branch, Okmulgee
1990–2008	Oklahoma State University, Okmulgee
2008–present	Oklahoma State University Institute of Technology

== Industry sponsors ==
- Plains All American Pipeline
- Caterpillar Inc.
- Ford Motor Company
- General Motors
- Komatsu
- Toyota Motor Company
- Western Equipment Dealers Association
- Pro-Tech (general automotive which includes certifications from Subaru
- MCAP (Mopar, Fiat-Chrysler)
- Phillips 66
- Weyerhaeuser
- Gas Processors Association
