= Tulsa metropolitan area =

Metropolitan area in northeastern Oklahoma

Tulsa Metropolitan Area
- Metropolitan Statistical Area
- Tulsa, OK Metropolitan Statistical Area
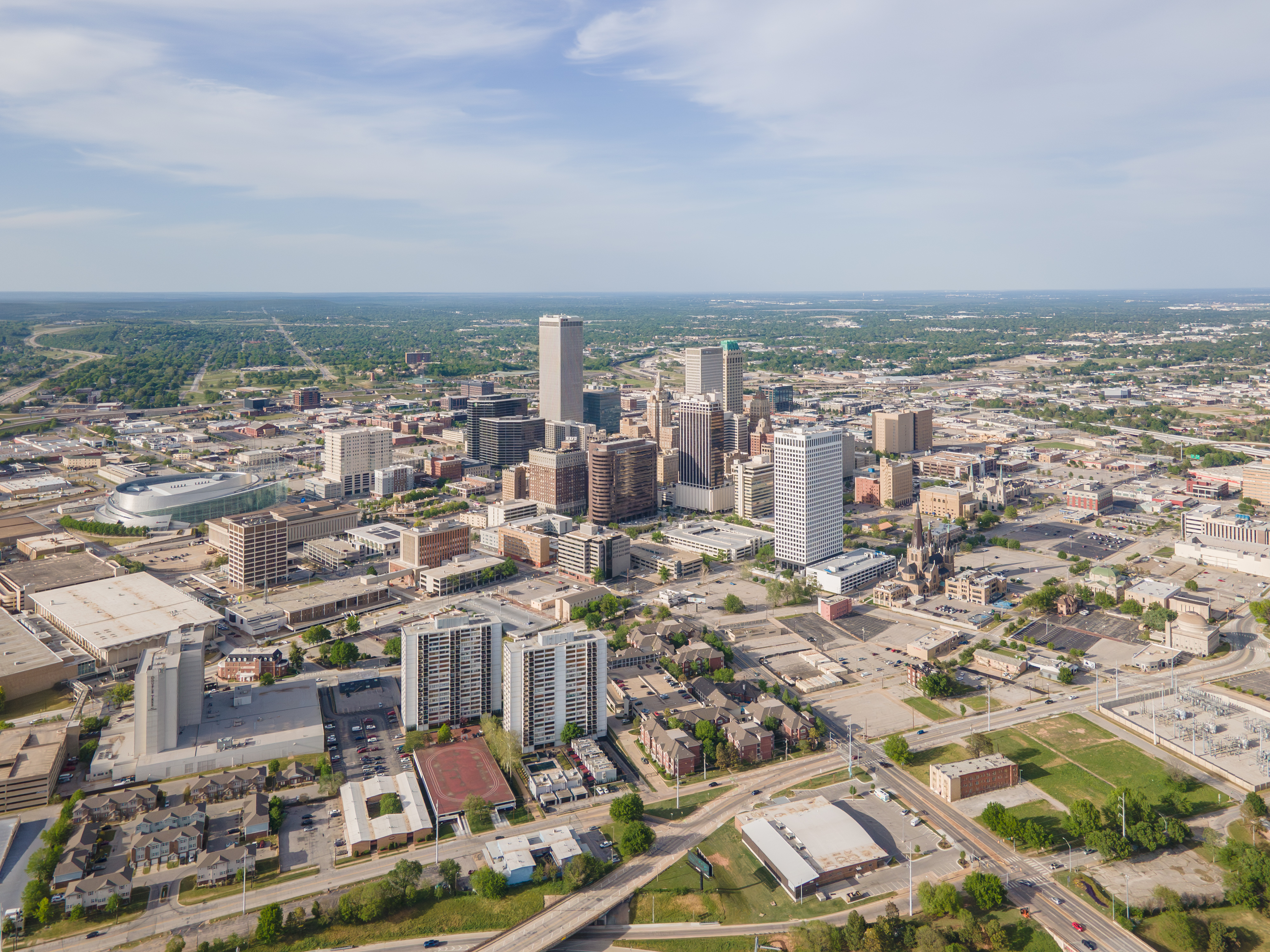
- The Skyline of Downtown Tulsa
- Nickname: Green Country
Interactive Map of Tulsa–Bartlesville–
Muskogee, OK CSA
City of Tulsa
Tulsa, OK MSA
Bartlesville, OK µSA
Muskogee, OK µSA
- Country: United States
- State: Oklahoma
- Principal City: Tulsa (416,209)
- Secondary Cities: Broken Arrow (124,991); Owasso (43,117); Bixby (32,766); Bartlesville (38,278); Muskogee (36,760)

Area
  - Total: 6,269 sq mi (16,240 km^{2})
- Highest elevation: 1,360 ft (410 m)
- Lowest elevation: 560 ft (170 m)

Population (2025)
  - MSA: 1,069,273 (53rd)
  - CSA: 1,190,018 (52nd)

GDP
  - MSA: $61.966 billion (2022)
- Time zone: UTC-6 (CST)
  - Summer (DST): UTC-5 (CDT)

The Tulsa metropolitan area is a metropolis in northeastern Oklahoma centered around the city of Tulsa and encompassing Tulsa, Rogers, Wagoner, Muskogee, Washington, Osage, Creek, Okmulgee and Pawnee counties. It had a population of 1,069,273 according to the 2025 U.S. census estimates.

== Counties ==
The Tulsa, OK Metropolitan Statistical Area, as defined by the Office of Management and Budget, is an area consisting of seven counties in northeastern Oklahoma, anchored by the city of Tulsa. The MSA had a population of 1,015,331 at the 2020 census.

County	Seat	2025 estimate	2020 census	Change	Area	Density
Tulsa	Tulsa	698,782	669,279	+4.41%	587 sq mi (1,520 km^{2})	1,190/sq mi (460/km^{2})
Rogers	Claremore	102,197	95,240	+7.30%	711 sq mi (1,840 km^{2})	144/sq mi (55/km^{2})
Wagoner	Wagoner	93,263	80,981	+15.17%	591 sq mi (1,530 km^{2})	158/sq mi (61/km^{2})
Creek	Sapulpa	74,967	71,754	+4.48%	970 sq mi (2,500 km^{2})	77/sq mi (30/km^{2})
Osage	Pawhuska	46,794	45,818	+2.13%	2,304 sq mi (5,970 km^{2})	20/sq mi (8/km^{2})
Okmulgee	Okmulgee	37,241	36,706	+1.46%	702 sq mi (1,820 km^{2})	53/sq mi (20/km^{2})
Pawnee	Pawnee	16,029	15,553	+3.06%	595 sq mi (1,540 km^{2})	27/sq mi (10/km^{2})
Total		1,069,273	1,015,331	+5.31%	6,460 sq mi (16,700 km^{2})	166/sq mi (64/km^{2})

== Cities ==
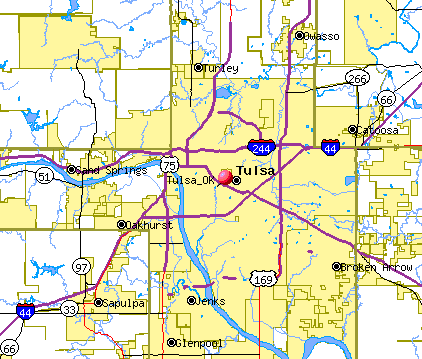
Tulsa sits at the center of an initial ring of suburbs.

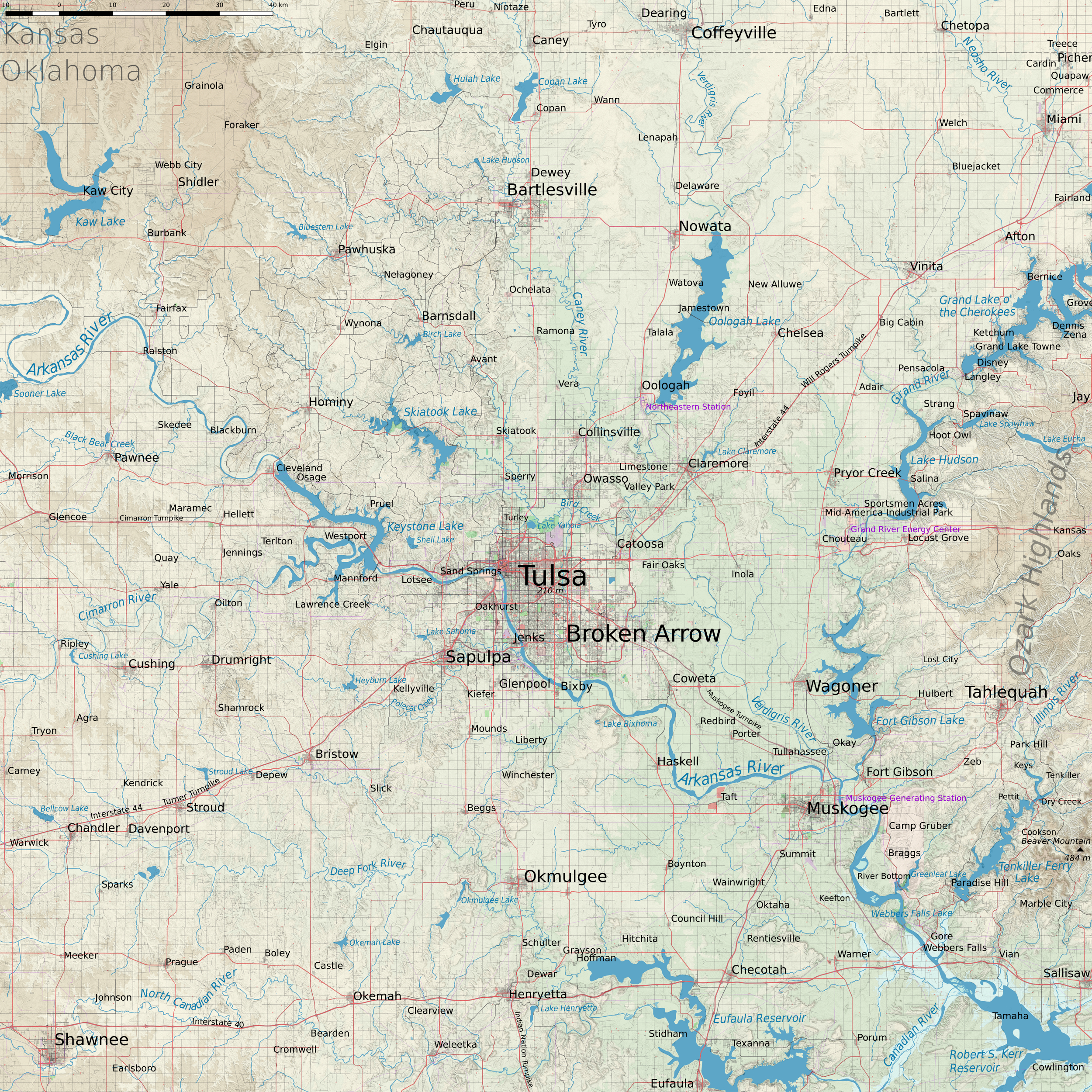
Regional Map

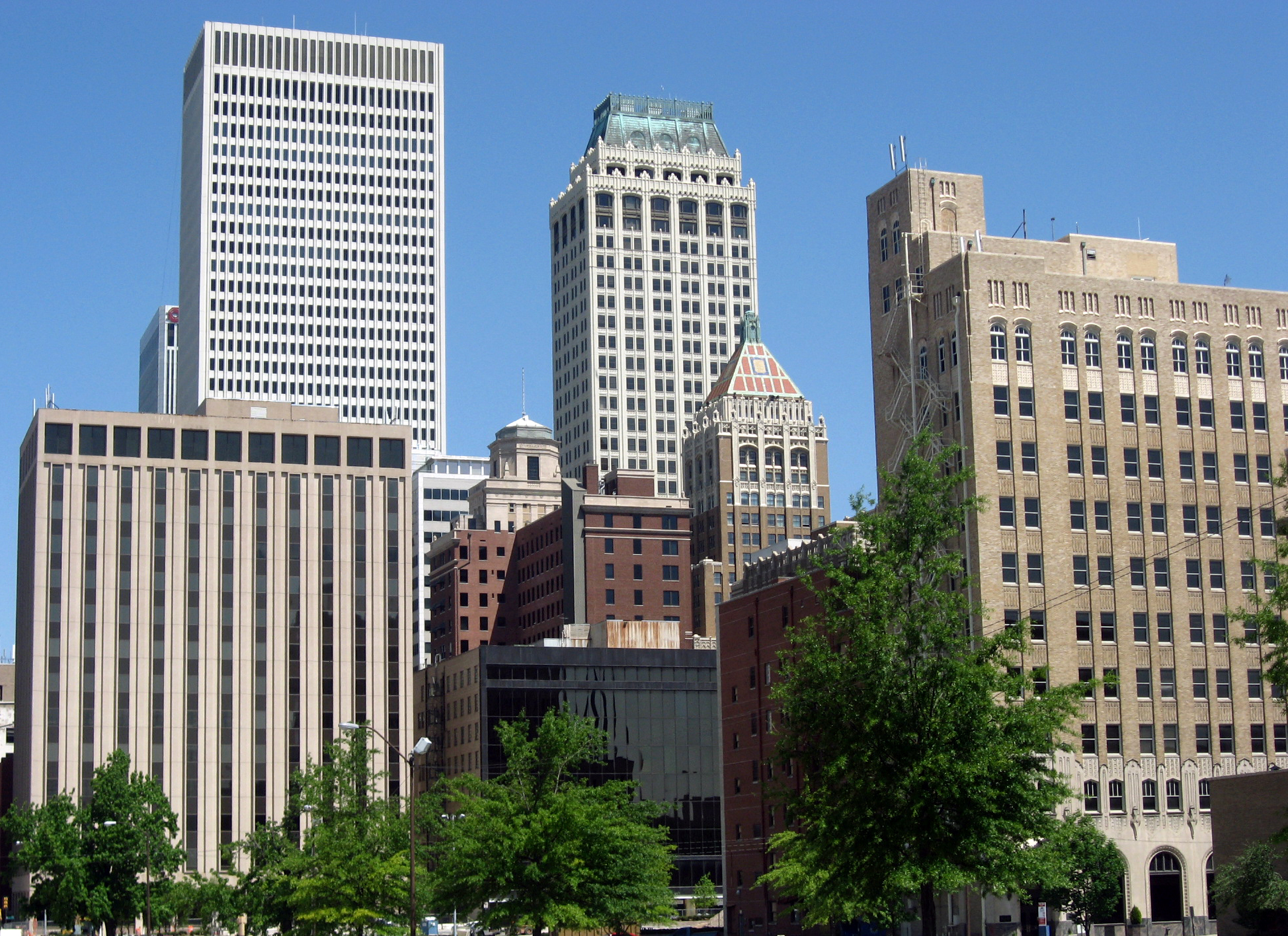
Tulsa serves as the economic engine of the region.

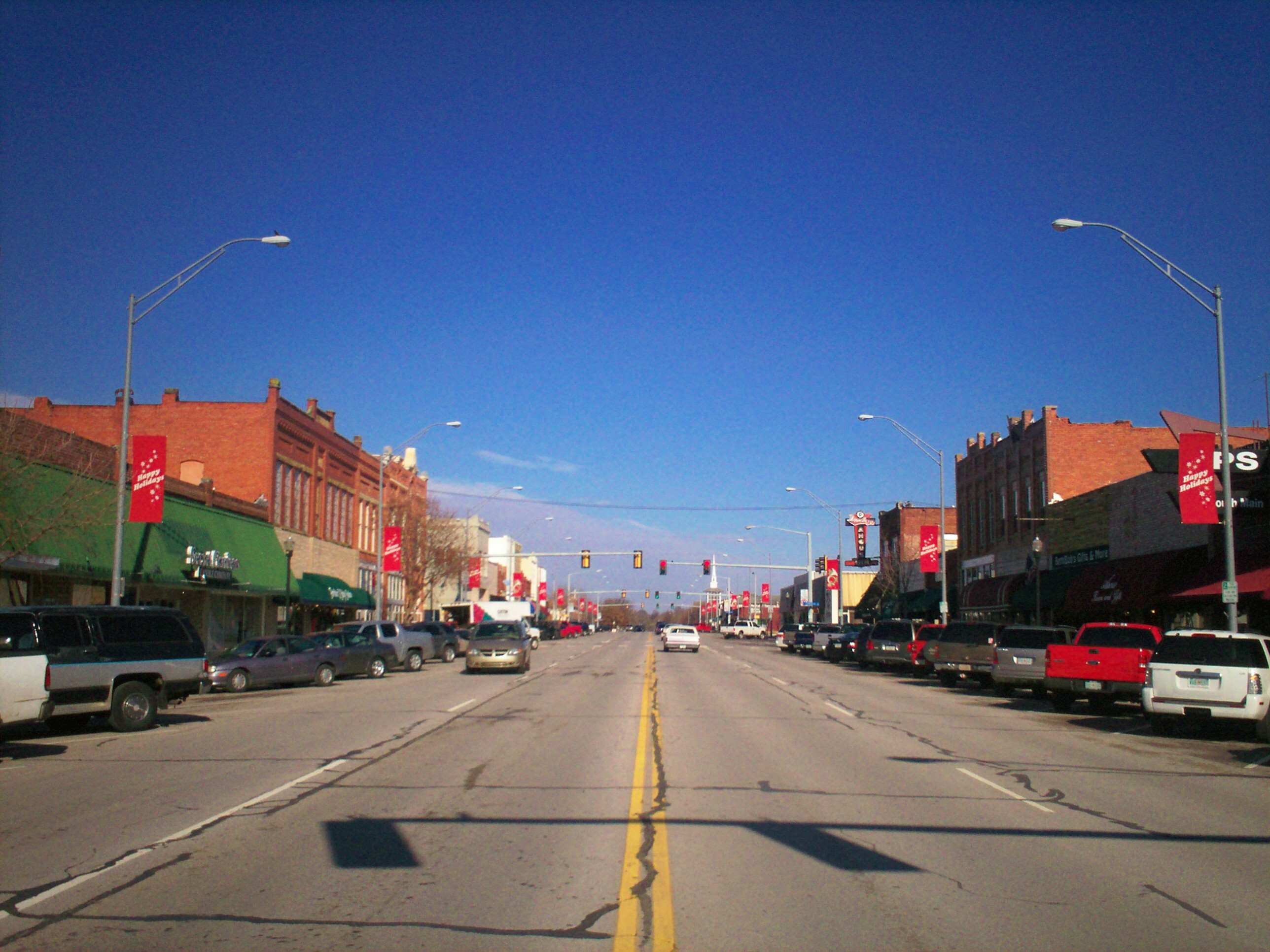
Broken Arrow is the region's second largest city.

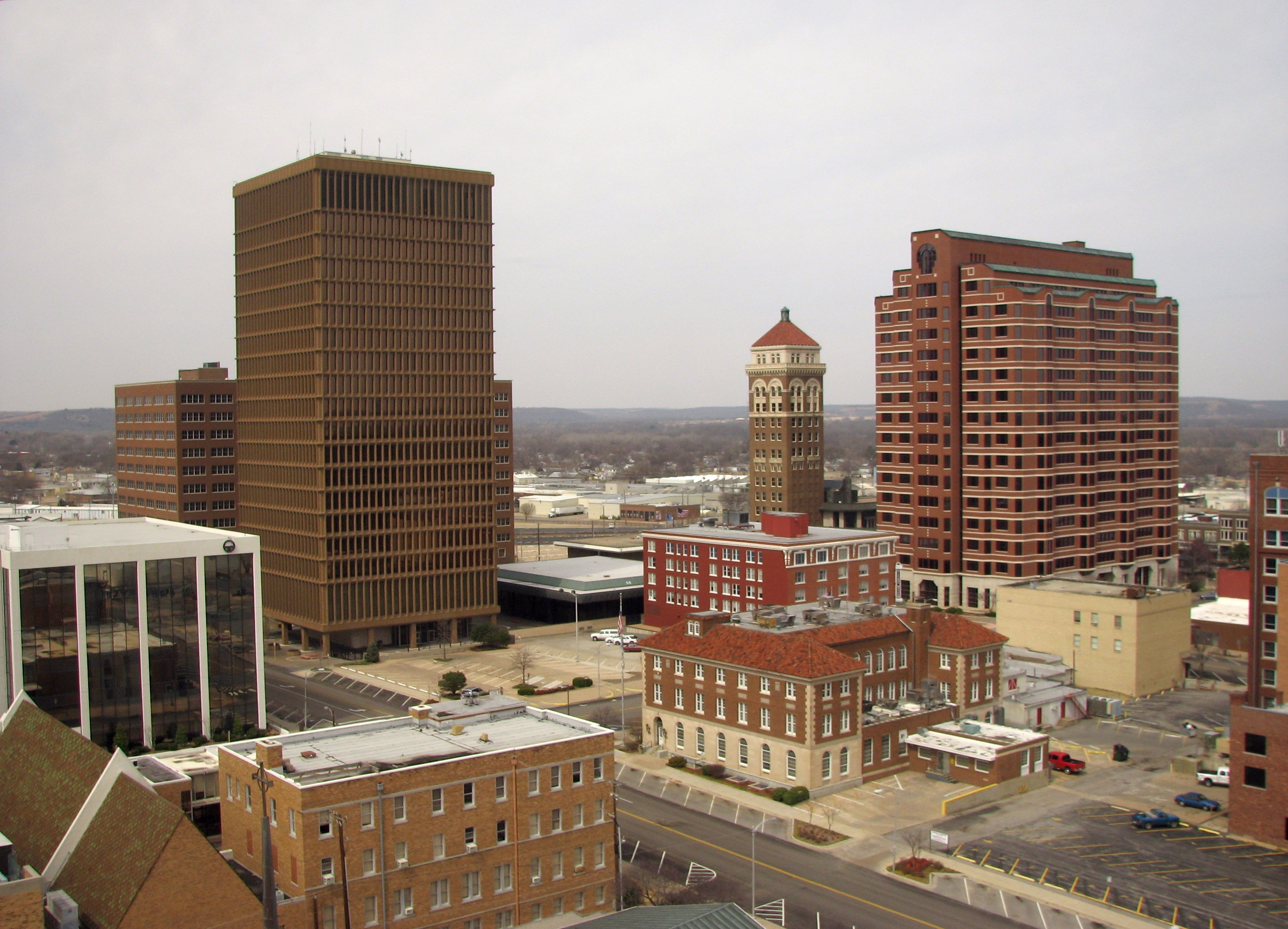
Bartlesville is the Tulsa–Bartlesville CSA's third largest city and the only outlying community with skyscrapers.

The Tulsa metropolitan area's anchor city, Tulsa, is surrounded by two primary rings of suburbs. Connected by suburban sprawl, the cityscapes of Tulsa and its initial outlying ring of suburbs form to make the immediate Tulsa Urban Area, an area that sits apart from a second ring of noncontiguous suburbs. Forming the first ring of suburbs are Catoosa, Bixby, Broken Arrow, Jenks, Owasso, Sand Springs, Sapulpa and Turley. Cities and towns in the second ring of suburbs include, Claremore, Okmulgee, Glenpool, Collinsville, Wagoner, Coweta, Skiatook, and Inola.

=== Largest cities ===
==== Tulsa ====
Tulsa, home to 415,154 people in 2024, is the principal cultural and economic hub of the Tulsa metropolitan area (TMA). The city, once known as the Oil Capital of the World, is still home to a large array of international oil-related industries, financial corporations, and manufacturing bases. The city contains the region's only public two-year college Tulsa Community College, and only private four-year universities, Oral Roberts University, and the University of Tulsa. The Tulsa International Airport and Tulsa Port of Catoosa serve as the region's primary international travel and shipping hubs.

==== Broken Arrow ====
Broken Arrow is the metropolitan area's second largest city. According to the 2020 US Census, Broken Arrow has a 2024 population of 122,756 residents and is the fourth largest city in the state. It is the 267th-largest city in the United States. Once a bedroom community for nearby Tulsa, Broken Arrow has emerged in recent decades as an economic center in its own right. In 2007, the city was rated the safest city in Oklahoma and 20th safest in the nation, as well as one of the nation's 100 best places to live.

==== Owasso ====
Owasso, a bedroom community of 42,831 people in 2024, is the third largest city in the Tulsa metropolitan area and one of the fastest-growing in the state. Situated just north of the Tulsa International Airport and the Tulsa Zoo in Tulsa and Rogers counties, the city is connected to Tulsa by Highway 169 and contains a large base of upscale retail.

==== Bartlesville ====
Bartlesville is an exurb of the city of Tulsa. With 38,355 people in 2024, the city is the fourth largest in the Tulsa-Bartlesville Combined Statistical Area, though it is not considered part of the immediate Tulsa Statistical Area by the Census Bureau. It is the county seat of Washington County, and contains the only skyscraper built by famed architect Frank Lloyd Wright, the Price Tower. Oklahoma Wesleyan University, a private four-year university and a branch of Rogers State University are Bartlesville's primary institutions of higher education.

==== Muskogee ====
Muskogee is another exurb of the city of Tulsa. With 36,849 people in 2024, the city is the fifth largest in the Tulsa-Bartlesville Combined Statistical Area. It is the county seat of Muskogee County. Bacone College, a private four-year university, and branches of Connors State College and Northeastern State University are Muskogee's primary institutions of higher education.

==== Bixby ====
Bixby is a rapidly growing city to the south of Tulsa. It had a population of 31,728 at the 2024 census estimate and has the largest per capita income in the TMA. Originally an agricultural community known as "The Garden Spot of Oklahoma", it has largely become a bedroom community in the Tulsa area.

==== Jenks ====
Jenks, the sixth largest city in the TMA, is another rapidly growing suburb of Tulsa, located southwest of Tulsa largely between the Arkansas River and U.S. Route 75. A portion of the Jenks Public School District extends east of the Arkansas River encompassing a part of the city of Tulsa south of 91st street. It is one of the fastest-growing cities in Oklahoma. As of the 2024 census estimate the city has a population 27,869. Jenks is known as the "Antiques Capitol of Oklahoma" and is home to the Oklahoma Aquarium.

==== Sapulpa ====
Sapulpa is a city in Creek and Tulsa counties, with its town center located approximately 14 miles southwest of downtown Tulsa. The population was 23,297 as of the 2024 United States census estimate, making it the seventh largest city in the TMC. It is the county seat of Creek County.

==== Sand Springs ====
Sand Springs, a diverse urban community is one of the oldest suburbs of Tulsa, and eighth largest city in the TMA. The population is 20,330 as of the 2024 U.S. Census estimate. It is located along the Arkansas River, just five miles west of downtown Tulsa. It has a fast-growing residential population and is recognized as a hub of industrial activity. Attractions in Sand Springs include the Keystone Ancient Forest, Sand Springs Pogue Airport, the Canyons at Blackjack Ridge Golf Course and easy access to Keystone State Park. The city is connected to Tulsa by Highway 412/64, 41st Street and Avery Drive.

==== Claremore ====
Claremore, the ninth largest city in the TMA, is an outer suburb of Tulsa and the county seat of Rogers County. The population is 20,602 as of the 2024 US Census estimate. It is home to Rogers State University, a public four-year university located on the city's west side. The city is home to many historical figures such as Will Rogers, a famous actor, Lynn Riggs, author of the novel that inspired the musical Oklahoma. Claremore is also the setting of Oklahoma the musical. Country singer Garth Brooks also lives just outside Claremore. The Will Rogers Memorial is located in Claremore.

=== Other communities ===
North – Skiatook, Collinsville, Oologah, Pawhuska, Dewey, Barnsdall.

West – Cleveland, Bristow, Mannford, Hominy.

East – Catoosa, Wagoner, Coweta, Porter, Inola, Verdigris, Pryor Creek.

South – Glenpool, Mounds, Beggs, Okmulgee, Henryetta and Haskell.

== Metropolitan statistics ==
Historical population
Census	Pop.	Note	%±
1900	1,390		—
1910	34,995		2,417.6%
1920	109,023		211.5%
1930	187,574		72.0%
1940	193,363		3.1%
1950	251,686		30.2%
1960	503,090		99.9%
1970	574,229		14.1%
1980	711,652		23.9%
1990	761,019		6.9%
2000	859,532		12.9%
2010	937,478		9.1%
2020	1,015,331		8.3%
2025 (est.)	1,069,273		5.3%
U.S. Decennial Census

As of the census of 2010, there were 937,478 people, 367,091 households, and 246,290 families residing within the MSA. The racial makeup of the MSA were as follows:

- White: 70.9% (68.7% Non-Hispanic White)
- Black or African American: 8.4%
- American Indian and Alaskan Native: 8.3%
- Asian: 1.8% (0.3% Vietnamese, 0.3% Indian, 0.3% Hmong, 0.2% Chinese)
- Pacific Islander: 0.1%
- Two or more races: 6.4%
- Some other race: 4.2%
- Hispanic or Latino (of any race): 8.4% (6.6% Mexican, 0.3% Puerto Rican, 0.2% Spanish, 0.2% Guatemalan)

The median income for a household in the MSA was $47,760 and the median income for a family was $59,746. The per capita income was $26,029.

== Combined Statistical Area ==
Based on commuting patterns, the Office of Management and Budget combines the Tulsa metropolitan area with the adjacent micropolitan areas of Muskogee (Muskogee County) and Bartlesville (Washington County) to form the broader Tulsa–Bartlesville–Muskogee, OK Combined Statistical Area (CSA), often referred to as the Green Country region. The population of this wider region is 1,190,018 as of 2025. The Tulsa CSA is the 52nd largest CSA in the United States.

Statistical Area	2025 estimate	2020 Census	Change	Area	Density
Tulsa, OK Metropolitan Statistical Area	1,069,273	1,015,331	+5.31%	6,460 sq mi (16,700 km^{2})	166/sq mi (64/km^{2})
Muskogee, OK Micropolitan Statistical Area	66,708	66,339	+0.56%	840 sq mi (2,200 km^{2})	79/sq mi (31/km^{2})
Bartlesville, OK Micropolitan Statistical Area	54,037	52,455	+3.02%	424 sq mi (1,100 km^{2})	127/sq mi (49/km^{2})
Total	1,190,018	1,134,125	+4.93%	7,724 sq mi (20,010 km^{2})	154/sq mi (59/km^{2})

== Transportation ==
=== Interstate Highways and turnpikes ===
The Tulsa metropolitan area is heavily reliant on automobiles as a means of transportation. Interstate 44 (which runs northeast–southwest), U.S. Highway 75 (which runs north–south) and U.S. Highway 412 (which runs east–west) serve as the major thoroughfares of the region. Turnpikes play a vital role in the region's transportation system. The Will Rogers I-44, Turner I-44, Muskogee OK-351, Gilcrease OK-344, Cimarron, and Creek OK-364 turnpikes aide travel in the area.

US Highway 412 is scheduled to be upgraded as Interstate-42. The planned interstate route includes the Cimarron and Cherokee Turnpikes and US-412 and will extend from Interstate 49 in Fayetteville, Arkansas to Interstate 35 near Perry, Oklahoma.

The state has approved the Creek OK-364 being renamed Interstate-644 and Muskogee OK-351 being renamed Interstate-343.

=== Transit ===
Tulsa Transit provides local transit services within the urbanized area. Intercity transit services are available through Greyhound Lines and Jefferson Lines at the Tulsa Bus Station.

=== Rail, seaport, and airport facilities ===
The area is home to the nation's farthest inland port, the Tulsa Port of Catoosa. This port, along with the Port of Muskogee, is situated along the McClellan-Kerr Arkansas River Navigation System, which helps in the shipment of goods to international trade routes. Several major rail lines are located throughout the region, although the Tulsa metropolitan area is one of the largest urban areas in the nation not served by Amtrak. The region's principal airport is the Tulsa International Airport, which offers passenger service. Other minor airports serving general aviation are located throughout the region.

== Education ==
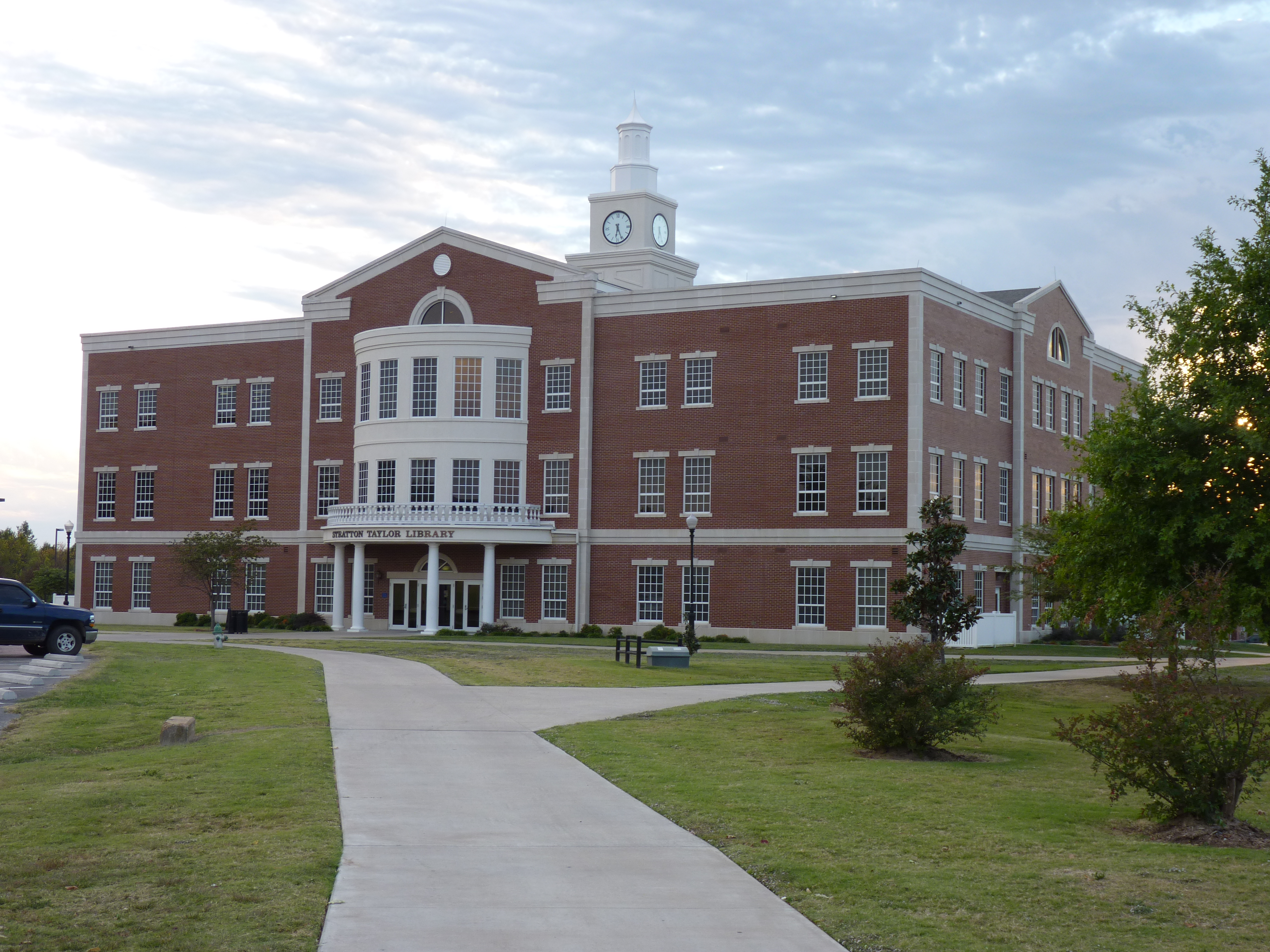
Rogers State University in Claremore is the Tulsa metropolitan area's only four-year public university.

=== Common education ===
The Tulsa metropolitan area, like much of the state of Oklahoma, is served by independent school districts. Each county contains several school districts and each school district is governed by a local school board. The region's largest school district is Tulsa Public Schools.

=== Higher education ===
See also List of colleges and universities in Tulsa, Oklahoma.

The Tulsa metro is home to several colleges and universities. The Tulsa area's largest private schools are University of Tulsa and Oral Roberts University. Rogers State University is located in Claremore with branch campuses in Bartlesville and Pryor. Also, there are branch campuses of major state colleges, such as Oklahoma State University–Tulsa, University of Oklahoma-Tulsa, and Northeastern State University in Broken Arrow. Langston University, Oklahoma's only Historically Black College (HBCU) has a satellite branch in Tulsa. Tulsa Community College serves thousands of students as the region's primary junior college.

Two medical schools are also located in the region: Oklahoma State University Center for Health Sciences and University of Oklahoma College of Medicine, where students can attend all four years of medical school since 2017.

The only law school in northeastern Oklahoma is the University of Tulsa College of Law.

In 2021, seven higher education institutions and seven community organizations in the Tulsa MSA founded the Tulsa Higher Education Consortium (THE Consortium) . THE Consortium is a higher education collaborative designed to support cross-institutional and cross-sector work. In December 2022, an eighth institutional member joined THE Consortium, which now comprises Langston University, Northeastern State University, Oklahoma State University–Tulsa, University of Oklahoma-Tulsa, Rogers State University, Tulsa Community College, University of Tulsa, and Southern Nazarene University- Tulsa. Affiliate members include the Oklahoma State Regents for Higher Education, the City of Tulsa, the Tulsa Regional Chamber of Commerce, the Broken Arrow Chamber of Commerce, ImpactTulsa, Schusterman Family Philanthropies, and Tulsa Community Foundation. THE Consortium is the only consortium of its kind (cross-institutional and cross-sector) in the state of Oklahoma.

As of 2011, 30% of adults in the City of Tulsa held a bachelor's degree or higher. In Broken Arrow 32% of adults held degrees, in Owasso 31% held degrees, in Bixby 38% held degrees, in Jenks 46% held degrees, and in Bartlesville 31% held degrees. This compares to 23.0% for all of Oklahoma and 28.2% for the entire U.S. In 2009, Businessweek ranked Tulsa as one of the best cities for new college grads.

== Economy ==
The Tulsa metropolitan area is the economic engine of the Green Country as well as Eastern Oklahoma. In 2017 the Tulsa metropolitan area's GDP was $57.7 billion, up from 43.4 billion in 2009, nearly thirty percent of Oklahoma's economy, and the 53rd largest in the nation. The chief industries of the region are energy, aerospace, telecommunications, and manufacturing. Energy has long been a dominant player in the area's economy, as Tulsa was once dubbed the 'Oil Capital of the World'. Today, Fortune 500 energy companies still call the area home, such as ONEOK and Williams Companies. There are major manufacturing and maintenance operations for the aerospace industry in Tulsa. In 2012, Engine Advocacy ranked the Tulsa Metro as having some of the highest growth in the high-tech industry at 7.6% compared to 2.6% for the national average for 2010–2012, and is expected to have continuous growth throughout 2013. The Tulsa region is home to the 8th best workforce in aerospace, 9th best in Energy and 18th best in telecommunications. In 2001, Tulsa metro's total gross product was in the top one-third of metropolitan areas, states, and countries globally, with more than $29 billion in total goods, expected to grow at a rate of nearly $500 Million every two years.

Among its residents, the Tulsa area is home to two billionaires, George Kaiser (BOK Financial Corporation), and Lynn Schusterman (philanthropist).

As of Nov 2012, the Metro's unemployment rate is 5.1 percent.

=== Shopping ===
Tulsa has many options for shopping. Some of the well known shopping areas are Downtown Tulsa, Brookside (Peoria Avenue), Cherry Street, Brady Arts District, and Utica Square.

== Recreation and tourism ==
=== Green Country ===
"Green Country" is a popular term used in different scenarios to describe different aspects of the Greater Tulsa Region, but may also refer specifically to the official Tulsa MSA. Each usage of the term is derived from its official meaning as the tourism designation for all of Northeastern Oklahoma. Its name was devised in the 1960s by the Oklahoma Department of Tourism and Recreation as one of six travel destination regions within the state, but is the most historically significant of all of them, as the name's usage can be traced to the early part of the 20th century. While the Tulsa MSA only officially occupies a section of Green Country as it is defined by the Oklahoma Department of Transportation, the entire region is sometimes referred to as the Greater Tulsa Area. On the same accord, the term "Green Country" often applies to the immediate Tulsa urban area or the city of Tulsa proper, but neither of these are technically the proper use for the term.

=== Attractions ===
The area has several lakes and state parks. Major lakes include Keystone, Skiatook, Fort Gibson, and Oologah. Popular state parks include Keystone Lake and Osage Hills.

The area contains two world-renowned museums: Gilcrease and Philbrook, both in Tulsa. Museums focusing on western heritage draw visitors, such as Woolaroc near Bartlesville and Will Rogers Memorial in Claremore.

==== Lakes and reservoirs ====
- Birch Lake
- Claremore Lake
- Fort Gibson
- Heyburn Lake
- Hulah Lake
- Kaw Lake
- Keystone Lake
- Oologah Lake
- Skiatook Lake
- Lake Yahola

==== State parks ====
- Dripping Springs State Park, Okmulgee County
- Keystone Lake, Tulsa County, Oklahoma
- Osage Hills, Osage County, Oklahoma
- Okmulgee State Park, Okmulgee County
- Sequoyah Bay State Park, Wagoner County
- Wah-Sha-She State Park, Osage County, Oklahoma
- Walnut Creek State Park, Osage County, Oklahoma

==== Other natural attractions ====
- Mohawk Park, a city-owned park in northeastern Tulsa that includes the Tulsa Zoo and the Oxley Nature Center
- Tulsa Botanic Garden
- Tallgrass Prairie Preserve is in Osage County, Oklahoma, near Foraker, Oklahoma.
- Turkey Mountain (Oklahoma), an urban wilderness park in southwestern Tulsa
- Redbud Valley, a city-owned nature reserve and wilderness trail
