= Keystone State Park =

Keystone State Park can refer to either of two state parks in the United States:

- Keystone State Park (Oklahoma)
- Keystone State Park (Pennsylvania)
