= Oklahoma State Highway 151 =

State highway in Oklahoma, United States

State Highway 151
- SH-151 highlighted in red

Route information
- Maintained by ODOT
- Length: 2.30 mi (3.70 km)
- Existed: 1964–present

Major junctions
- South end: SH-51 east of Mannford
- North end: US 64 / US 412 west of Sand Springs

Location
- Country: United States
- State: Oklahoma

Highway system
- Oklahoma State Highway System; Interstate; US; State; Turnpikes
← SH-150	→ SH-152

State Highway 151 (abbreviated SH-151 or OK-151) runs 2.30 miles (3.70 km) across Keystone Dam in northeastern Oklahoma. Its entire length is within Tulsa County. The route has no lettered spur routes.

SH-151 was ostensibly assigned to Keystone Dam upon its completion in 1964.

== Route description ==
State Highway 151 begins at a trumpet interchange with SH-51 east of Mannford. While elevated from this interchange, the highway crosses the BNSF Railway. SH-151, running north-northeast, then serves as the eastern boundary of Keystone State Park. It then runs across the top of Keystone Dam; on the west side of the dam lies Keystone Lake, while on the east side is the Arkansas River. After crossing the dam, the route ends at US-64/US-412 at another trumpet interchange, west of Sand Springs.

== History ==
Keystone Dam was completed in 1964. The dam was first shown as a state highway on the 1965 state highway map. No SH-151 shield was shown on this map, however; presumably it was omitted for space reasons. The highway would remain unlabeled on the official state maps until the 2008 edition.

== Junction list ==
The entire route is in Tulsa County.

Location	mi	km	Destinations	Notes
	0.00	0.00	SH-51	Southern terminus; trumpet interchange
	2.30	3.70	US-64/US-412	Northern terminus; trumpet interchange
1.000 mi = 1.609 km; 1.000 km = 0.621 mi
