= Metropolitan Tulsa Transit Authority =

Public transit system for Tulsa, Oklahoma, US

MetroLink Tulsa
- Parent: City of Tulsa
- Founded: 1968
- Headquarters: 510 South Rockford, Tulsa
- Locale: Tulsa, Oklahoma
- Service area: Tulsa, Jenks, Broken Arrow, and Sand Springs
- Service type: bus service, paratransit, express bus service
- Routes: 18
- Hubs: 2
- Fleet: 141 buses and vans
- Daily ridership: 6,491 (weekdays, 2023)
- Annual ridership: 1,991,867 (2023)
- General manager: Scott Marr
- Website: metrolinkok.org

MetroLink Tulsa, officially the Metropolitan Tulsa Transit Authority (MTTA), is the public transit system for Tulsa, Oklahoma, United States. It has 18 bus routes, paratransit service, and several microtransit zones that serve Tulsa. The system has two major hubs: Memorial Midtown Station in Midtown Tulsa and the Denver Avenue Station in Downtown Tulsa.

The Metropolitan Tulsa Transit Authority was formed in 1968 to replace a private operator during a bus drivers' strike. It is the successor to earlier companies that ran streetcars in Tulsa from 1906 to 1936. MTTA adopted the brand name Tulsa Transit in 1980. It was rebranded to MetroLink Tulsa in 2024.

== History ==
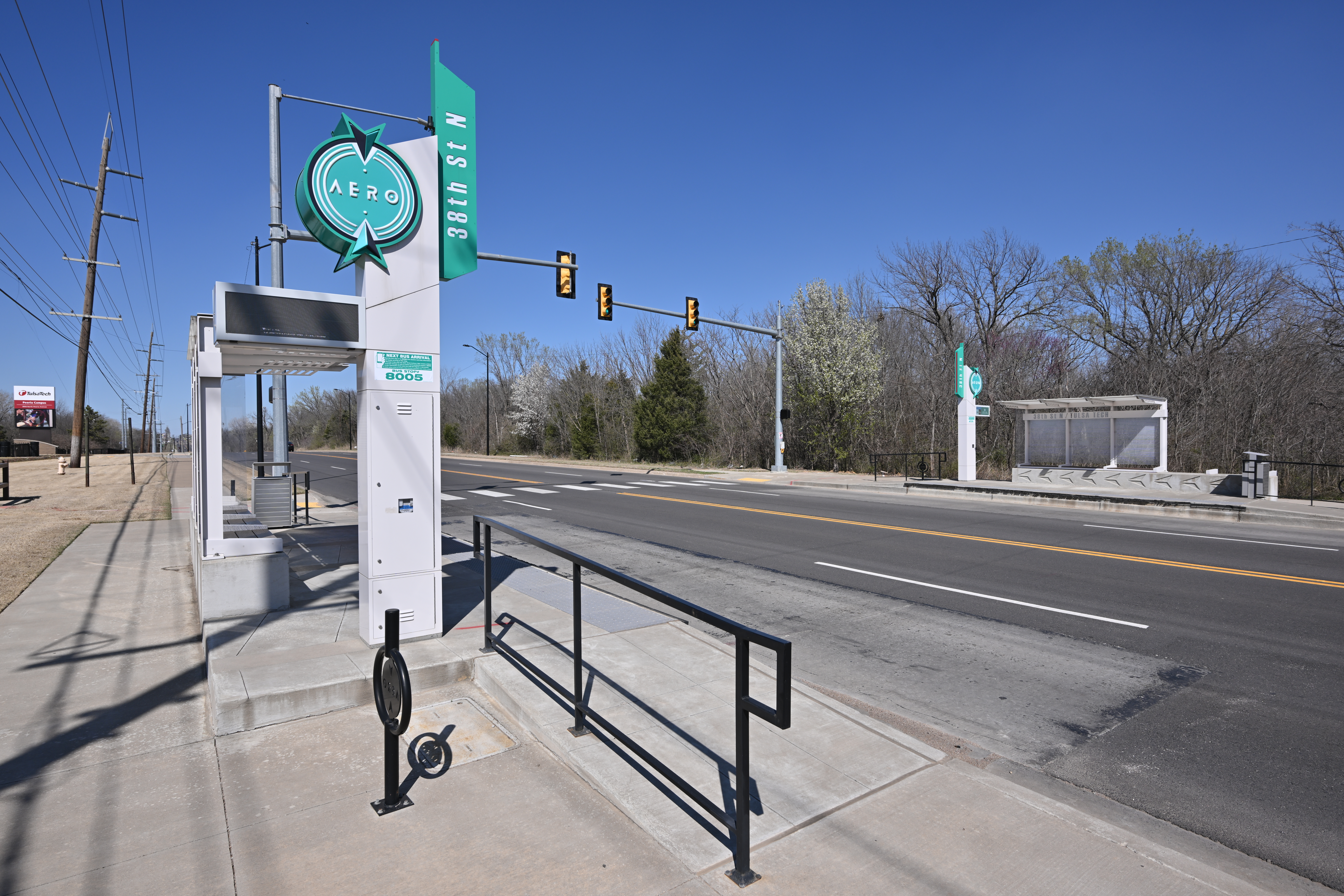
Tulsa Transit Aero bus stop 8005

The Tulsa Street Railway, the first streetcar system in the city, was formed in 1905 and granted an operating franchise for Main Street. It began operations in 1906 and was joined by a second streetcar operator, the Oklahoma Union Traction Company, in 1909. By 1921, the streetcar companies operated a combined 21 miles (34 km) of track and drew 750,000 passengers. The Tulsa Street Railway was acquired by the Union Transportation Company, owned by oilman Thomas Baker Slick Sr. and operator of local "jitney" buses, at an auction in 1922. The company itself was acquired by National City Lines and renamed to Tulsa City Lines (TCL), who ceased streetcar operations on February 6, 1936.

TCL replaced the streetcars with new buses and reached its highest annual ridership, nearly 29.6 million, in 1946. Use declined in later years and a competitor, the Tulsa Transit Company, entered the area in 1948 and quickly expanded to serve areas around the city of Tulsa. In 1956, the Tulsa Transit Company filed a lawsuit to dispose TCL of their city operating franchise and sought to take over the routes. They partnered with MK&O Transit Lines, the operator of intercity buses in the region, and petitioned for a special election to decide on the 25-year operating franchise for Tulsa. On January 18, 1957, a large majority of Tulsa voters approved the transfer of the operating franchise to MK&O Transit Lines, who announced that they would acquire the Tulsa Transit Company. MK&O began operating Tulsa's local buses on July 1, 1957, with a fleet of 99 buses—of which 86 were new—and retained most of the TCL's employees.

Ridership on Tulsa buses continued to decline under MK&O ownership, decreasing from 11 million in 1957 to 3.7 million in 1967. The company announced in April 1968 that it would cease its operations in the city in July 1969 due to financial losses unless it received a subsidy from the city government. The company's bus drivers began a 52-day strike on July 19 to seek higher wages, which led to plans for the city government to form their own transit operator. The Metropolitan Tulsa Transit Authority (MTTA) was established on August 2, 1968, and negotiated an end to the strike as it prepared to take over service from MK&O, who agreed to lease out their facilities and equipment. Service under the MTTA began on September 9 with 45 buses leased from MK&O.

The MTTA simplified its fare structure in 1973 to eliminate its zones and reduce the cost to a flat rate of 25 cents; a day pass was introduced the following year. The agency adopted Tulsa Transit as its brand name in 1980. Tulsa Transit also opened its headquarters and maintenance facility in November of that year. The first dedicated funding source for Tulsa Transit, a 0.3 percent sales tax, was approved by voters in 1996. A downtown hub, Denver Avenue Station, opened in May 1998 with an indoor waiting area, 10 bus bays, and a customer service center. It cost $5.4 million to construct and was financed by the sales tax. The sales tax, named "Vision Tulsa", was renewed in 2016 and funded the development of two bus rapid transit lines and a future downtown transit hub.

Tulsa Transit introduced Sunday service in July 2017 using funding from Vision Tulsa; the Sunday bus system was modified to allow for requested deviations from normal routes. The agency eliminated its former system of request stops, which allowed passengers to request stops not marked by signs, in September 2019. The change was made during a major route restructure that was the agency's largest in 15 years. MetroLink Tulsa "Aero" or 700, Tulsa's first bus rapid transit line, began operating on November 17, 2019, on Peoria Avenue from 52nd Street North to 81st Street South and Lewis. Aero has 52 stations and buses that arrive every 15 to 30 minutes. It had been proposed in 2013 to replace the existing route 105, which had carried 15 percent of the system's ridership. Aero 700 officially launched on December 19, 2019.

In August 2023, Tulsa Transit had its busiest month, with ridership reaching about 290,000. A microtransit service launched the same month and replaced the agency's Sunday and nighttime routes. MetroLink Tulsa was officially adopted as the system's new name in March 2024. A second bus rapid transit line, named Route 66 for the historic highway, will travel on East 11th Street from Downtown Tulsa to the Eastgate Metroplex. It was originally scheduled to begin construction in August 2024 and open in February 2025, but was delayed several years due to a lack of funding. The line is scheduled to open in June 2026 for the centennial of Route 66.

== Services ==
MetroLink Tulsa has 18 routes that operate regular fixed service from Monday to Saturday. Aero bus rapid transit operates 7 days a week with a frequency of every 20 to 30 minutes. The agency also has several microtransit zones, named "MicroLink", that operate similar to ride-hailing. MicroLink operates in place of normal fixed routes during the night hours and on Sundays.

Fares are paid on board with cash, coins, a paper pass, or the GoPass app. Since July 2023, passengers age 18 or younger are not charged a fare.

=== Routes ===
MetroLink operates a variety of routes all over the city, and into Jenks, Broken Arrow and Sand Springs although it does not run as a full-time bus fleet in those locations. Each set of routes is grouped by the first of the three digits, as follows:

- 1xx routes serve Denver Avenue Station to various parts of the city.
- 2xx routes serve various parts of the city between Denver Avenue and Memorial Midtown Stations.
- 3xx routes serve Memorial Midtown Station to various parts of the city without going to Downtown Tulsa.
- 4xx routes serve neither station, but serve parts of the city.
- 5xx routes serve areas outside of Tulsa.
- 6xx routes run during major events as shuttles.
- 7xx routes are bus rapid transit routes.
- 8xx routes are operate only on Sundays, or at night, and serve each quadrant of the city.
- 9xx routes are express and link Downtown Tulsa and outlying park and rides.

== Facilities ==
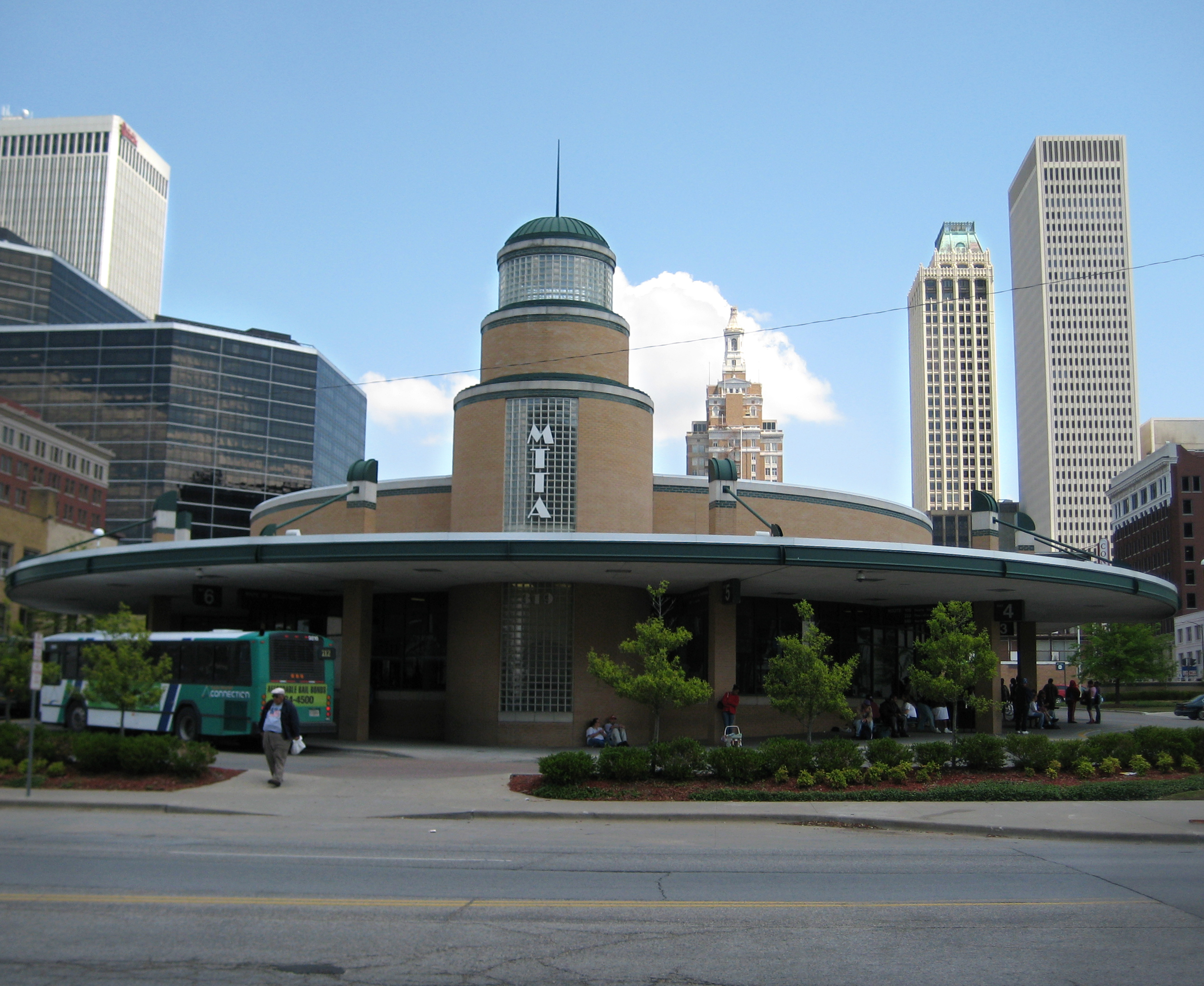
Denver Avenue Station

Denver Avenue Station is the main Downtown Tulsa hub of the system, located adjacent to the civic center and BOK Center. About 20 percent of passenger trips on the MetroLink system travel through downtown; the Denver Avenue Station was put up for sale in October 2026 and a replacement downtown facility has not been identified. Another hub, Memorial Midtown Station, is located near Interstate 44 to the southeast of Downtown Tulsa. It was closed in 2020 during the COVID-19 pandemic and reopened in 2024.

== Fleet ==
As of 2022, the system has 107 buses that are mostly powered by compressed natural gas. There are also four battery electric buses and seven that use diesel fuel.

== Fixed route ridership ==
The ridership statistics shown here are of fixed route services only and do not include demand response services.

== See also ==
- Tulsa Bus Station
- List of bus transit systems in the United States
