= Keystone State Park (Oklahoma) =

State park in Oklahoma, United States

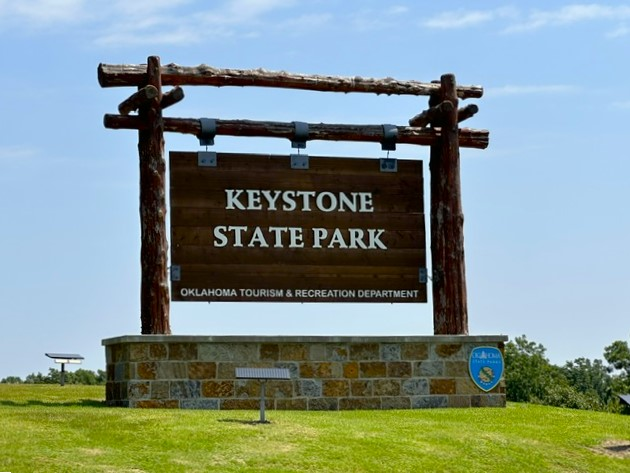
- Keystone State Park entry sign, July 2026

- Location within Oklahoma
- Location: Tulsa County, Oklahoma, United States
- Nearest city: Sand Springs, OK, Tulsa
- Coordinates: 36.1406365°N 96.2680648°W
- Area: 714 acres (289 ha)
- Visitors: 243,454 (in 2021)
- Governing body: Oklahoma Tourism and Recreation Department
- Website: www.travelok.com/listings/view.profile/id.4163

Keystone State Park is an Oklahoma state park near Sand Springs, Tulsa County, Oklahoma, in the United States. Located on Keystone Lake, the park covers 714 acres (289 ha) and provides recreational opportunities for fishing, swimming, water skiing and boating. Cabins are available to rent. Keystone State Park is on State Highway 151 near Mannford.

== Fees ==
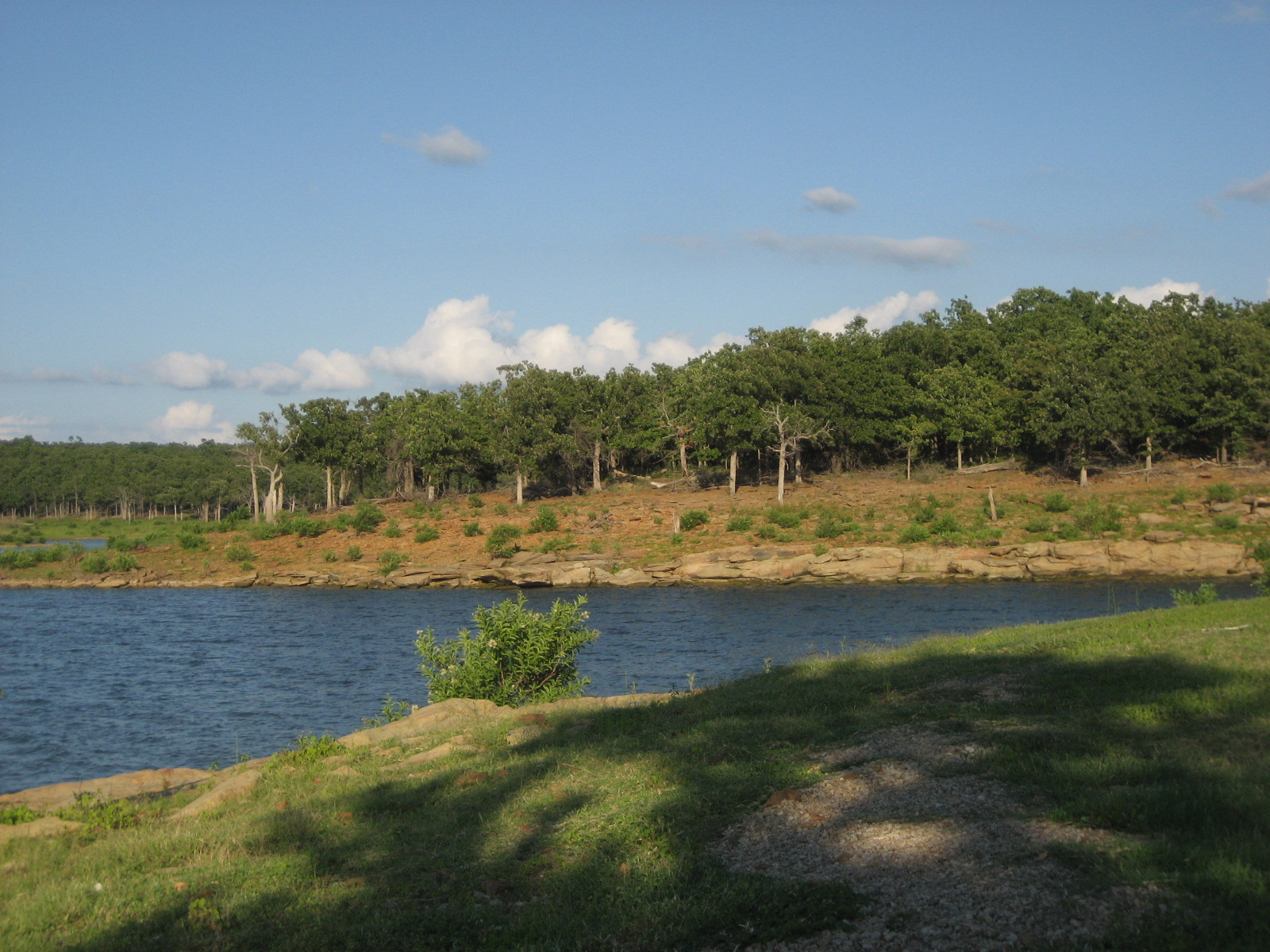
Shoreline view at Keystone State Park, Oklahoma

To help fund a backlog of deferred maintenance and park improvements, the state implemented an entrance fee for this park and 21 others effective June 15, 2020. The fees, charged per vehicle, start at $10 per day for a single-day or $8 for residents with an Oklahoma license plate or Oklahoma tribal plate. Fees are waived for honorably discharged veterans and Oklahoma residents age 62 & older and their spouses. Passes good for three days or a week are also available; annual passes good at all 22 state parks charging fees are offered at a cost of $75 for out-of-state visitors or $60 for Oklahoma residents.
