= List of colleges and universities in Tulsa, Oklahoma =

== Public and private universities and colleges in Tulsa, Oklahoma ==
Tulsa is home to a variety of colleges and universities, including:

- National American University- Tulsa campus
- New York University - Tulsa Global Site
- Oklahoma State University Center for Health Sciences - (Tulsa)
- Langston University - Tulsa campus
- Oklahoma State University Institute of Technology (OSUIT Okmulgee)
- Oklahoma State University–Tulsa (upper division undergraduate and graduate campus)
- Oral Roberts University (private)
- Philips Theological Seminary (private)
- Tulsa Community College
- University of Oklahoma - Schusterman Center (upper division undergraduate and graduate campus)
- University of Tulsa (private)
