= Walnut Creek State Park =

- Location within Oklahoma
- Location: Osage County, Oklahoma, United States
- Nearest city: Prue, OK
- Coordinates: 36.245°N 96.283611°W
- Area: 1,429 acres (578 ha)
- Established: 1966

Walnut Creek State Park was a former Oklahoma State Park on the north shore of Lake Keystone, 4 miles (6.4 km) west of Prue in Osage County, Oklahoma. The park was created in 1966, and contains 1,400 acres. Facilities include sandy beaches, a softball field, picnic shelter with tables, RV hookups, and tent sites and restrooms. The 15 miles (24 km) long Sand Plum Trail is open to hikers, horseback riders, and mountain bikers. The park has an equestrian campground, but visitors must bring their own horses because horses are not available for rent in the park. The park was open all year.

The state of Oklahoma officially closed this park permanently on October 1, 2014. The U.S. Army Corps of Engineers is responsible for selecting the final disposition of what remains of the facility.
