= Aero (bus rapid transit) =

Bus rapid transit service in Tulsa, Oklahoma, United States

AERO
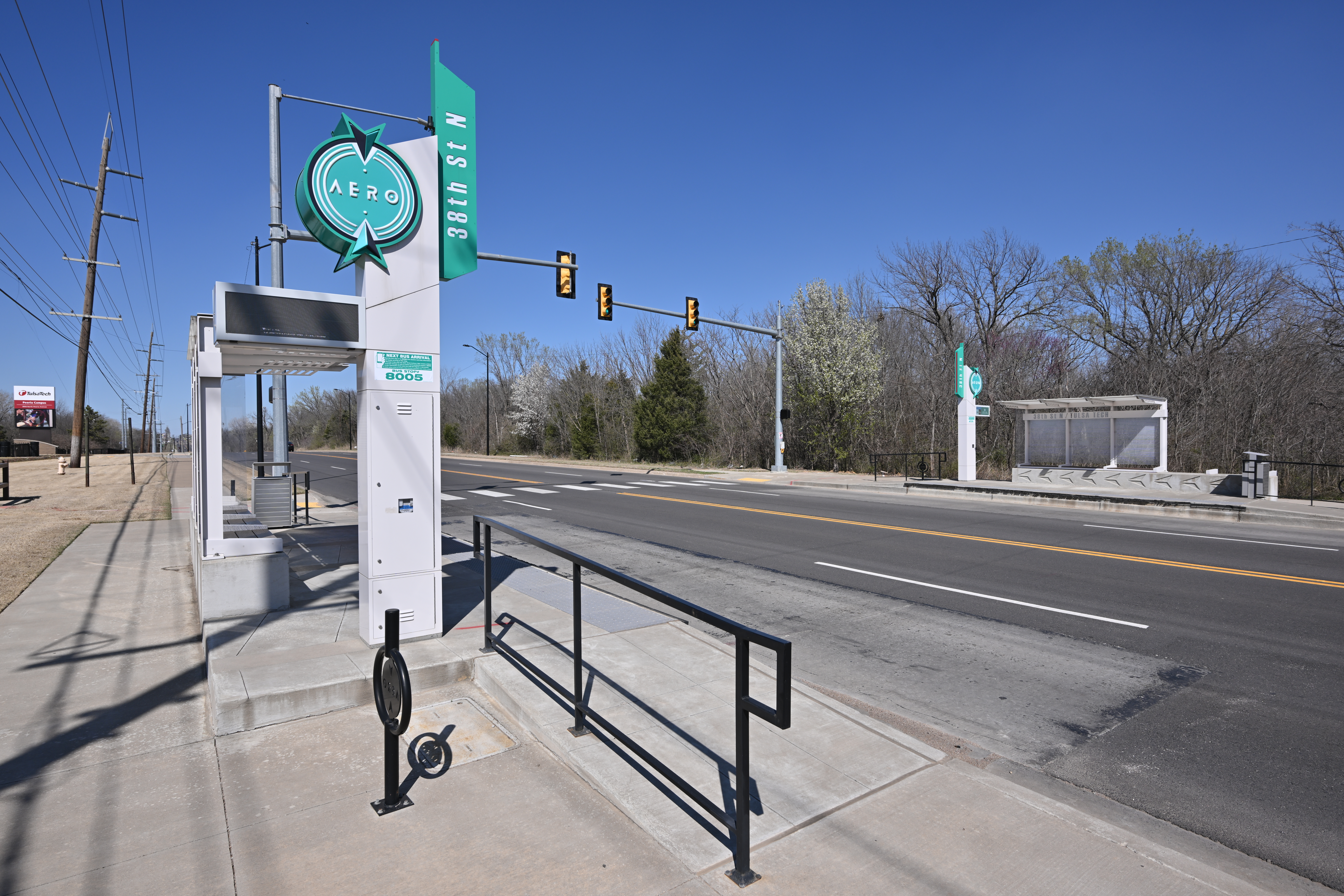
- The Peoria Avenue at 38th Street North AERO station

Overview
- System: MetroLink Tulsa
- Vehicle: Gillig Low Floor
- Began service: December 19, 2019

Route
- Locale: Tulsa, Oklahoma
- Start: 81st Street & Lewis Avenue
- End: Peoria Avenue & 56th Street North
- Length: 18 miles (29 km)
- Stations: 52

Service
- Frequency: Monday-Saturday: 20 minutes Sunday: 30 minutes
- Ridership: 53,000/month (April 2023)

AERO is a bus rapid transit (BRT) service in Tulsa, Oklahoma, United States. It is operated by MetroLink Tulsa and serves an 18 miles (29 km) north–south corridor through central Tulsa. Planning for the project began in earnest in 2013, with full service beginning in late 2019. The system uses 40-foot (12 m) buses on a route featuring some BRT features, but notably lacking others such as dedicated lanes and off-board fare payment.

== History ==
Planning for bus rapid transit in Tulsa began with the FastForward regional transit plan in 2012 which identified seven corridors suitable for the service. Peoria Avenue was chosen as the first corridor because one in seven residents live within a ten-minute walk and one in five jobs are within a ten-minute walk of the corridor.

In the original plan, bus service would double from 81st Street on the south end to 38th Street North on the north end. Headways would decrease from 30 minutes to 15 minutes at peak times with travel times decreasing from 70 minutes to 50 minutes. The service would complement the existing Route 105, which carried 15% of all transit trips in the city as of 2013.

Stations along the route were planned to be approximately every half-mile, with a notable exception in midtown. Between 21st and 31st Streets, no stops were planned due to neighborhood opposition, despite the presence of the Philbrook Museum of Art in the vicinity being a draw for riders. Improved stations would receive ticket machines, benches, bus tracking, new sidewalks and bike racks.

The Peoria Avenue line received funding from the city's capital improvements budget starting in 2013, and a Tulsa Vision permanent transit tax passed by voters in April 2016. In July 2017, the AERO branding was announced, referencing the history of the aerospace industry in the city.

On November 17, 2019, the line began taking passengers in a testing phase. Up until the official opening on December 19, there were 50,000 passengers on the route. To celebrate the service, buses were free until January 2.

=== Route 66 Line ===
Among the potential BRT corridors studied, a route along 11th Street from downtown to the Eastgate Metroplex, at 21st Street and 145 East Avenue was identified as a second priority. Funding for this route, Route 66, was included as part of the 2016 Vision Tulsa capital improvements program. The original timeline was for the 44-station route to open in 2024. However, due to cost increases, as well as the difficulty in securing further funding, the project has been delayed. As of late 2026, it is expected to break ground in late 2027 or early 2028 with an opening a year thereafter.

== Operations ==
=== Stations ===
The route runs north–south through primarily along Peoria Avenue in Tulsa. The 52 stations often include benches, shelters and an arrival sign, however not all stations are built to this standard.

=== Headways ===
Time	5A	6A	7A	8A	9A	10A	11A	12P	1P	2P	3P	4P	5P	6P	7P	8P	9P	10P	11P
Monday-Saturday	20																		
Sunday	No service		30															No service	

=== Buses ===
The AERO system uses 11 Gillig Low Floor CNG buses equipped with wifi and bike racks.
