= Prue, Oklahoma =

- Town
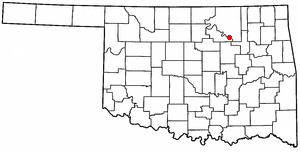
- Location of Prue, Oklahoma
- Coordinates: 36°14′58″N 96°16′03″W
- Country: United States
- State: Oklahoma
- County: Osage

Area
  - Total: 0.46 sq mi (1.19 km^{2})
  - Land: 0.46 sq mi (1.19 km^{2})
  - Water: 0 sq mi (0.00 km^{2})
- Elevation: 817 ft (249 m)

Population (2020)
  - Total: 374
  - Density: 817/sq mi (315.5/km^{2})
- Time zone: UTC-6 (Central (CST))
  - Summer (DST): UTC-5 (CDT)
- ZIP code: 74060
- Area codes: 539/918
- FIPS code: 40-60850
- GNIS feature ID: 2412511
- Website: townofprue.gov

Prue is a town in southwestern Osage County, Oklahoma, United States. As of the 2020 census, the community had 374 residents. The town was named for Henry Prue, who owned the original townsite. Prue was relocated when Lake Keystone was built, and is sometimes called "New Prue".

== History ==
Prue was a small settlement when the Missouri, Kansas and Oklahoma Railroad (later the Missouri–Kansas–Texas Railroad, often called the MKT or "Katy") extended its line from Wybark (near Muskogee) to Osage via Prue in 1902–03. The Prue post office was established in September 1905, and town lots were sold at public auction beginning on March 22, 1911.

Oil exploration around Prue began circa 1911, and the Prue Field was opened east-northeast of town in 1920, becoming a major source of natural gas. The nearby East Osage City and Twin Creek oil fields have continued producing into the twenty-first century.

Keystone Dam construction began in 1956. By the time of completion in 1964, the lake covered 90 percent of the original town. Railroad service to Prue ended in 1964.

== Geography ==
Prue is located 46 miles (74 km) south of Pawhuska and 30 miles (48 km) northwest of Tulsa. Prue lies on the Arkansas River arm of Lake Keystone.

According to the United States Census Bureau, the town has a total area of 0.4 square miles (1.0 km^{2}), all land.

Prue is designated as "New Prue" because the original town is now under Lake Keystone, created when the Keystone Dam was completed in 1964.

== Demographics ==
Historical population
Census	Pop.	Note	%±
1970	271		—
1980	554		104.4%
1990	346		−37.5%
2000	433		25.1%
2010	465		7.4%
2020	374		−19.6%
U.S. Decennial Census

=== 2020 census ===
As of the 2020 census, Prue had a population of 374. The median age was 43.0 years. 23.0% of residents were under the age of 18 and 20.3% of residents were 65 years of age or older. For every 100 females there were 95.8 males, and for every 100 females age 18 and over there were 100.0 males age 18 and over.

0.0% of residents lived in urban areas, while 100.0% lived in rural areas.

There were 147 households in Prue, of which 28.6% had children under the age of 18 living in them. Of all households, 50.3% were married-couple households, 25.2% were households with a male householder and no spouse or partner present, and 17.7% were households with a female householder and no spouse or partner present. About 25.1% of all households were made up of individuals and 9.5% had someone living alone who was 65 years of age or older.

There were 176 housing units, of which 16.5% were vacant. The homeowner vacancy rate was 0.8% and the rental vacancy rate was 4.2%.

Racial composition as of the 2020 census
Race	Number	Percent
White	314	84.0%
Black or African American	0	0.0%
American Indian and Alaska Native	31	8.3%
Asian	0	0.0%
Native Hawaiian and Other Pacific Islander	0	0.0%
Some other race	2	0.5%
Two or more races	27	7.2%
Hispanic or Latino (of any race)	10	2.7%

=== 2000 census ===
As of the census of 2000, there were 433 people, 169 households, and 128 families residing in the town. The population density was 953.8 inhabitants per square mile (368.3/km^{2}). There were 196 housing units at an average density of 431.7 per square mile (166.7/km^{2}). The racial makeup of the town was 86.61% White, 0.23% African American, 6.24% Native American, 0.23% Asian, and 6.70% from two or more races. Hispanic or Latino of any race were 0.69% of the population.

There were 169 households, out of which 35.5% had children under the age of 18 living with them, 61.5% were married couples living together, 13.0% had a female householder with no husband present, and 23.7% were non-families. 20.7% of all households were made up of individuals, and 11.2% had someone living alone who was 65 years of age or older. The average household size was 2.56 and the average family size was 2.91.

In the town, the population was spread out, with 26.3% under the age of 18, 8.8% from 18 to 24, 27.5% from 25 to 44, 22.2% from 45 to 64, and 15.2% who were 65 years of age or older. The median age was 36 years. For every 100 females, there were 100.5 males. For every 100 females age 18 and over, there were 95.7 males.

The median income for a household in the town was $26,696, and the median income for a family was $32,917. Males had a median income of $26,667 versus $20,833 for females. The per capita income for the town was $13,335. About 9.4% of families and 14.0% of the population were below the poverty line, including 21.7% of those under age 18 and 10.4% of those age 65 or over.
