= Tulsa Bus Station =

Intercity bus station in Tulsa, Oklahoma

- The station in 2026

General information
- Location: 317 S. Detroit Ave., Tulsa, Oklahoma
- Coordinates: 36.153989°N 95.986902°W
- Operator: Greyhound Lines
- Bus stands: 6
- Bus operators: Greyhound Lines; Jefferson Lines
- Connections: Tulsa Transit

Other information
- Website: Official website

History
- Opened: August 4, 1926
- Closed: August 12, 1987
- Rebuilt: March 7, 1981
Location

The Tulsa Bus Station is an intercity bus station situated in downtown Tulsa, Oklahoma. The station, managed by Greyhound Lines, also serves Jefferson Lines. The current bus station was originally utilized by Trailways and has served as the only intercity bus station since 1987.

Tulsa has had an intercity bus terminal since at least 1926, when a union bus depot opened at the northeast corner of East 4th Street and South Cincinnati Avenue. Later stations were generally located in the vicinity, with new stations opening in 1934 and 1961. The present location has had intercity bus service since 1981.

== Attributes ==
The Greyhound station building sits at the northeast corner of East 4th Street and South Detroit Avenue in downtown Tulsa. The main entrance is located on South Detroit Avenue. The bus station is owned by Greyhound Lines, but also serves Jefferson Lines.

== History ==
=== Early stations ===
The first union bus station in Tulsa opened August 4, 1926 at the northeast corner of East 4th Street and South Cincinnati Avenue. The terminal replaced a handful of smaller stations scattered around Tulsa. Upon opening, the depot served six bus operators over 15 routes with 74 daily arrivals and departures using 128 buses. The terminal also served the interurban Oklahoma Union Railway.

At the start of the 1930s, Greyhound Lines was looking to establish a new terminal in Tulsa. Simultaneously, the Southern Kansas Stage Lines moved out of the union station to a new location at 211 South Cincinnati Avenue on August 13, 1932.

In 1933, Waite Phillips, a local businessman, purchased the union depot property with the intent of remodeling the station. The Pickwick-Greyhound Lines, Southern Kansas Stage Lines, and Missouri Kansas and Oklahoma Lines signed ten-year leases for the proposed station. The new terra cotta and stucco station would feature six bus bays, a distinctive 47-foot sign, segregated waiting rooms, ticket offices, a newsstand, coffee shop, women's lounge, and passenger bathing facilities. The three story structure was designed by Smith & Senter and opened on February 3, 1934. Over 3,000 people participated in opening celebrations, which included a parade of buses, an orchestra performance, and ice cream sticks and cigars. Upon opening, there were 80 arrivals and departures daily.

According to the Tulsa World, the terminal was considered the finest in the southwest. By 1936, it served 118 daily schedules and 2,000 passengers. The companies serving the station included Southwestern Greyhound Lines, Santa Fe Trail System, and Missouri, Kansas and Oklahoma Coach Lines. By 1950, there were two million annual passengers on 200 daily buses. This would slowly decrease to 135 daily schedules and 1.5 million annual passengers by 1960.

In 1961, Continental American Trailways Co. began searching for a new location for a bus depot. The company settled on a Firestone Tire facility at 121 West 6th Street and quickly began a $100,000 remodeling. The new facility opened on December 18, 1961 serving Continental American, Continental Central, Sapulpa Transportation Co., Southern Kansas Greyhound Lines, and Arkoma Coach Lines. At the time, there were 35 arrivals and 35 departures per day.

=== Current station ===
The inside of the station in 2011

In 1980, Continental Trailways began searching for a site to provide a new terminal. Their terminal at 121 West 6th Street needed to be vacated to make way for the 52-story Cities Service Building. The selected site, at 317 South Detroit Avenue, was formerly occupied by a Blood Plasma Services building. Conversion of the structure was completed in early 1981, allowing for an opening on March 7th.

In late 1986, Greyhound announced their intent to relocate from the Union Bus Station after 53 years. A location was selected off I-44 at 10159 East 11th Street. This location, occupied by a former Guarantee National Bank branch, was intended to open for service on May 1, 1987. However, due to asbestos contamination, this opening was delayed to August. This also came to naught, due to Greyhound purchasing Trailways on July 14th. As a result, there was no need for a separate terminal and Greyhound relocated to the Trailways terminal on South Detroit Avenue on August 12th.

The now vacant union bus station auctioned off equipment before closure and the location was purchased by the First Baptist Church. Despite the art deco station having been studied for inclusion on the Oklahoma Landmarks Inventory, it was soon demolished for parking.

== See also ==
- Tulsa Transit
