= Osage, Oklahoma =

- Town
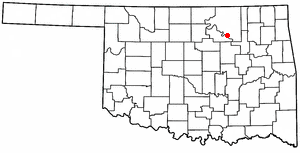
- Location of Osage, Oklahoma
- Coordinates: 36°17′42″N 96°25′05″W
- Country: United States
- State: Oklahoma
- County: Osage

Area
  - Total: 0.31 sq mi (0.81 km^{2})
  - Land: 0.31 sq mi (0.81 km^{2})
  - Water: 0 sq mi (0.00 km^{2})
- Elevation: 833 ft (254 m)

Population (2020)
  - Total: 177
  - Density: 567.8/sq mi (219.21/km^{2})
- Time zone: UTC-6 (Central (CST))
  - Summer (DST): UTC-5 (CDT)
- ZIP code: 74054
- Area codes: 539/918
- FIPS code: 40-56150
- GNIS feature ID: 2413093

Osage is a town in Osage County, Oklahoma, United States. Also known as Osage City, it lies within the Osage Reservation on the shore of Lake Keystone. As of the 2020 census, the community had 177 residents.

== Geography ==
Osage is 31 miles south of Pawhuska.

According to the United States Census Bureau, the town has a total area of 0.3 square miles (0.78 km^{2}), all land.

== Demographics ==
Historical population
Census	Pop.	Note	%±
1920	757		—
1930	627		−17.2%
1940	628		0.2%
1950	425		−32.3%
1960	220		−48.2%
1970	170		−22.7%
1980	243		42.9%
1990	163		−32.9%
2000	188		15.3%
2010	156		−17.0%
2020	177		13.5%
U.S. Decennial Census

=== 2020 census ===
As of the 2020 census, Osage had a population of 177. The median age was 49.8 years. 23.7% of residents were under the age of 18 and 19.2% of residents were 65 years of age or older. For every 100 females there were 115.9 males, and for every 100 females age 18 and over there were 128.8 males age 18 and over.

0.0% of residents lived in urban areas, while 100.0% lived in rural areas.

There were 83 households in Osage, of which 26.5% had children under the age of 18 living in them. Of all households, 48.2% were married-couple households, 28.9% were households with a male householder and no spouse or partner present, and 18.1% were households with a female householder and no spouse or partner present. About 25.3% of all households were made up of individuals and 7.2% had someone living alone who was 65 years of age or older.

There were 86 housing units, of which 3.5% were vacant. The homeowner vacancy rate was 0.0% and the rental vacancy rate was 0.0%.

Racial composition as of the 2020 census
Race	Number	Percent
White	132	74.6%
Black or African American	0	0.0%
American Indian and Alaska Native	29	16.4%
Asian	0	0.0%
Native Hawaiian and Other Pacific Islander	0	0.0%
Some other race	2	1.1%
Two or more races	14	7.9%
Hispanic or Latino (of any race)	5	2.8%

=== 2000 census ===
As of the census of 2000, there were 188 people, 80 households, and 54 families residing in the town. The population density was 585.5 inhabitants per square mile (226.1/km^{2}). There were 108 housing units at an average density of 336.3 per square mile (129.8/km^{2}). The racial makeup of the town was 78.19% White, 0.53% African American, 11.70% Native American, and 9.57% from two or more races.

There were 80 households, out of which 30.0% had children under the age of 18 living with them, 57.5% were married couples living together, 7.5% had a female householder with no husband present, and 32.5% were non-families. 27.5% of all households were made up of individuals, and 10.0% had someone living alone who was 65 years of age or older. The average household size was 2.35 and the average family size was 2.89.

In the town, the population was spread out, with 23.9% under the age of 18, 6.9% from 18 to 24, 26.1% from 25 to 44, 25.0% from 45 to 64, and 18.1% who were 65 years of age or older. The median age was 40 years. For every 100 females, there were 108.9 males. For every 100 females age 18 and over, there were 113.4 males.

The median income for a household in the town was $25,125, and the median income for a family was $24,375. Males had a median income of $26,500 versus $30,000 for females. The per capita income for the town was $15,875. About 23.5% of families and 21.8% of the population were below the poverty line, including 23.3% of those under the age of eighteen and 10.0% of those sixty-five or over.

== In popular culture ==
A fictional Osage, Oklahoma, is the main town depicted in the novel Cimarron by Edna Ferber and the motion picture based on it, which won three Academy Awards including Best Picture.
