= Sand Springs, Oklahoma =

City in Osage, Creek, and Tulsa counties, Oklahoma, United States

- City
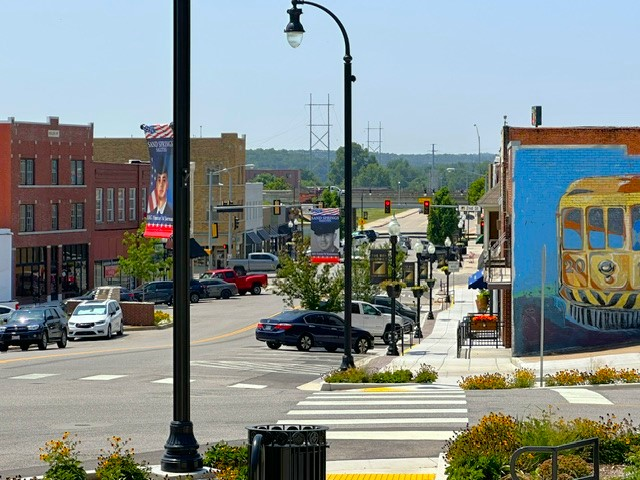
- Along Main Street in the Box District of Sand Springs, 7-2026

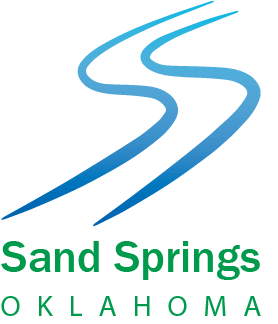

- Location within Tulsa County and Oklahoma

- Location in the United States
- Coordinates: 36°8′22″N 96°6′37″W
- Country: United States
- State: Oklahoma
- Counties: Tulsa, Osage, Creek
- Established: 1912

Government
  - Type: City Council
  - Mayor: Jim Spoon

Area
  - Total: 22.07 sq mi (57.16 km^{2})
  - Land: 19.82 sq mi (51.33 km^{2})
  - Water: 2.25 sq mi (5.84 km^{2})
- Elevation: 650 ft (200 m)

Population (2020)
  - Total: 19,874
  - Density: 1,002.9/sq mi (387.21/km^{2})
- Time zone: UTC-6 (CST)
  - Summer (DST): UTC-5 (CDT)
- ZIP code: 74063
- Area codes: 539/918
- FIPS code: 40-65300
- Website: www.sandspringsok.gov

Sand Springs is a city in Osage, Creek and Tulsa counties in the U.S. state of Oklahoma. A western suburb of Tulsa, it is located predominantly in Tulsa County. The population was 19,874 in the 2020 U. S. Census, an increase of 5.1 percent from the figure of 18,906 recorded in 2010.

== History ==
The city was founded in 1911, by philanthropist Charles Page, a wealthy businessman in Oklahoma. He envisioned Sand Springs as a haven for orphans and widows. Page helped found and develop Sand Springs as a model city that included all components of a total community.

Page bought 160 acres of land in Tulsa County in 1908, intending to build a home for orphan children. The first 27 children, who had been abandoned by the Hook & Anchor Orphanage in Tulsa, were housed in a tent. This was soon replaced by a frame building large enough to house 50 children.

Page decided to form a model community, to be called Sand Springs, on land west of the children's home. He offered free land to any person who wished to move there, and a $20,000 bonus (the amount varied and he also offered free utilities) to companies that would relocate there. In 1911, Page created the Sand Springs Railway, an interurban connecting Sand Springs to Tulsa. The townsite was laid out the same year. Sand Springs was incorporated as a city in 1912, with a population of 400.

In 1911, Page also built the Sand Springs Power Plant, on the southeast corner of Main Street and Morrow Road. It anchored an area that Page intended to use for industrial development. Several significant additions were made to the facility, and it was the sole source of electric power for Sand Springs until 1947.

Some of the earliest manufacturing industries were: Kerr Glass Manufacturing; Commander Mills, Kerr, Hubbard and Kelley Lamp, and Chimney; Southwest Box Company; Empire Chandelier Company; and Sinclair Prairie Refining Company. Medical and social welfare institutions other than the Sand Springs Home included the Oakwood Sanitorium for nervous and mental diseases, Poole Hospital, the Salvation Army Maternity Home, and the Sand Springs School for the Deaf. Sand Springs became a center of glass production in Oklahoma. Kerr Glass Manufacturing moved to Sand Springs from Chicago in 1913. It and the Alexander H. Kerr company, which made fruit jars, were the only glass companies remaining in business as recently as 1955. In 1965, Sand Springs annexed Prattville, on the south side of the Arkansas River, an event that would explain the large jump in population in the 1960s.

In 1935, Commander Mills' workers picketed against purported incompliance by mill administration following the passage of the National Labor Relations Act of 1935. Parleys between mill officials and workers were initiated February 14, with unionized mill workers demanding full accordance with the act's codes and ordinances. The disagreement between mill officials and workers was over section 7-A of the N.R.A., stating that employees had the right to self organization. Mill officials disagreed, stating section 7-A was invalid by decree of the courts. On April 4, a brawl between union and non-union workers broke out at the gates of Commander Mills, ending in several injuries and one arrest. The following month, multiple mill workers subsequently began with acts of violence and terrorism in retaliation against mill officials and non-union workers. Totaling eleven explosions (twelve attempts in total, one failed to explode), four shootings, and one assault, the criminal campaign lasted from May 5 to July 4.

Sand Springs Children's Home is still operating, caring for school-age children in a family-style setting, and with an Independent Living program for graduated students. The facility supports Camp Charles, which is an eight-acre camp in Grove on Grand Lake, where the kids get to camp, cookout, swim, ski and take boat rides. The Charles Page Family Village, formerly known as the Widow's colony, provides duplex housing to 110 mothers and their children at no cost for rent, utilities or home maintenance.

An EF2 tornado hit Sand Springs on March 25, 2015, killing one resident, injuring 30 citizens, and damaging 50 mobile homes.

On November 26, 2018, Clyde Boyd Middle School had a CO leak. The leak started sometime during the morning. Between 11:15 a.m. and 12:58 p.m., five students went home ill, and between 1:15 to 1:35, seven more students became sick. At approximately 2:27, an announcement on the intercom instructed all the students to "go to the new gym". Many students went to hospital from carbon monoxide poisoning. "There was no evidence of the presence of carbon monoxide in the 6th Grade Center". Over 50 students were sent to nearby hospitals. The school didn't have carbon monoxide detectors at the time, which the district said: "it'll resolve". The school was closed for several days while the problem was fixed. The district has now installed proper carbon monoxide detectors.

In late 2023, the historic downtown district was renamed as the Box District, as a tribute to long-time community volunteer and businessman Montie R. Box.

== Geography ==
According to the United States Census Bureau, the city has a total area of 21.0 square miles (54.3 km^{2}), of which 18.7 square miles (48.4 km^{2}) is land and 2.3 square miles (5.9 km^{2}) (10.84%) is water.

The one-way driving distance between Sand Springs and Tulsa (downtown to downtown) is about 7 miles (11 km). It is roughly located in the western section of Tulsa County and the southern section of Osage County and has a small sliver within Creek County's boundaries.

== Demographics ==
Historical population
Census	Pop.	Note	%±
1920	4,067		—
1930	6,674		64.1%
1940	6,137		−8.0%
1950	6,994		14.0%
1960	7,754		10.9%
1970	10,555		36.1%
1980	13,121		24.3%
1990	15,346		17.0%
2000	17,451		13.7%
2010	18,906		8.3%
2020	19,874		5.1%

=== 2020 census ===
As of the 2020 census, Sand Springs had a population of 19,874; the median age was 39.1 years, with 24.8% of residents under the age of 18 and 18.1% 65 years of age or older. For every 100 females there were 90.3 males, and for every 100 females age 18 and over there were 86.5 males.

91.2% of residents lived in urban areas, while 8.8% lived in rural areas.

There were 7,899 households in Sand Springs, of which 32.9% had children under the age of 18 living in them. Of all households, 47.3% were married-couple households, 15.4% were households with a male householder and no spouse or partner present, and 30.7% were households with a female householder and no spouse or partner present. About 27.7% of all households were made up of individuals and 13.7% had someone living alone who was 65 years of age or older.

There were 8,582 housing units, of which 8.0% were vacant. Among occupied housing units, 67.1% were owner-occupied and 32.9% were renter-occupied. The homeowner vacancy rate was 2.1% and the rental vacancy rate was 12.3%.

Racial composition as of the 2020 census
Race	Percent
White	72.6%
Black or African American	2.5%
American Indian and Alaska Native	8.7%
Asian	0.5%
Native Hawaiian and Other Pacific Islander	0.1%
Some other race	1.7%
Two or more races	14.0%
Hispanic or Latino (of any race)	5.2%

=== 2000 census ===
As of the 2000 United States census there were 17,451 people, 6,564 households, and 4,870 families residing in the city. The population density was 934.2 inhabitants per square mile (360.7/km^{2}). There were 6,979 housing units at an average density of 373.6 per square mile (144.2/km^{2}).

The racial makeup of the city was White, African American, Native American, Asian, Pacific Islander, other races, and from two or more races.

There were 6,564 households, out of which 38.1% had children under the age of 18 living with them, 58.3% were married couples living together, 12.3% had a female householder with no husband present, and 25.8% were non-families. 22.7% of all households were made up of individuals, and 10.2% had someone living alone who was 65 years of age or older. The average household size was 2.59 and the average family size was 3.05.

In the city, the population was spread out, with 28.4% under the age of 18, 8.3% from 18 to 24, 28.9% from 25 to 44, 22.2% from 45 to 64, and 12.2% who were 65 years of age or older. The median age was 35 years. For every 100 females, there were 92.7 males. For every 100 females age 18 and over, there were 87.0 males.

The median income for a household in the city was $40,380, and the median income for a family was $47,258. Males had a median income of $38,120 versus $25,373 for females. The per capita income for the city was $18,193. About 6.7% of families and 9.1% of the population were below the poverty line, including 11.6% of those under age 18 and 7.6% of those age 65 or over.

== Economy ==
The economy of Sand Springs is largely focused on promoting small businesses. It has a very active chamber of commerce.

According to the Encyclopedia of Oklahoma History & Culture, the most significant businesses in 2000 were: Webco Industries, Sheffield Steel Corporation, Rader Diagnostic Center, Smith-Fibercast, Cust-O-Fab, Piping Companies Incorporated, and Baker Petrolite.

On February 3, 2026, the Sand Springs City Council approved ‘Project Spring,’ being a new data center constructed for Google on 827 acres of annexed land about eight miles north of downtown. Construction is intended to start in 2027, with a completion by 2029. New infrastructure required for Project Spring, including a new substation and transmission lines, are to be funded by Google.

== Government ==
Sand Springs has a council-manager form of government. In Sand Springs, the city manager serves as the chief executive officer, the mayor serves as the chairman of the board, and the city council serves as the board of directors.

The city council has seven council members, each elected to a three-year term. The mayor and vice mayor are elected annually by the council. The seven council members represent each of the city's six wards; one member serves in an at-large position. The city manager can appoint a city clerk with the approval of the city council. The city clerk is responsible for preparing and maintaining the minutes of all city council meetings.

The current city manager is Mike Carter, and the current city clerk is Janice Almy.

== Sports ==
Although no major sports team is located in Sand Springs, many sporting opportunities are found in the city, including their Softball, baseball, and Soccer Complexes.

The complexes include the Jerry Adair Complex for baseball. Whilst the Roger G. Bush Complex operates for Soccer. Softball takes place within the William Ramsey Softball Complex and features "5 fields w/lights, bleachers, playground, restrooms, and concessions".

Each year, around Halloween, the Charles Page High School softball and baseball teams don Halloween costumes for the annual Monster Ball, and the money raised benefits the Sand Springs Special Olympic athletes. "It’s a game of softball but there are some rule changes. Baseball players must bat the opposite of their dominant hand, and there is an unlimited amount of positions on the field. The outfield could have 20 outfielders at any given time".

Many sports are played through an athletic team from Charles Page High School. Sand Springs has a multitude of Youth Sports that include Baseball, Basketball, Tennis, Football, Wrestling, Track, and others. Many of the sports are either in a Varsity team, Junior Varsity team, or both.

Sand Springs contains the only BMX Track in the Tulsa metro, and one of only 3 tracks in Oklahoma. The BMX Track began operating in July 2000, and the facility features a 2-acre moto-cross style bicycle track with lighting, playground, and concessions. Following flooding in Sand Springs in late May 2019, several parts of the BMX Track were damaged by flood waters up to 12 feet deep. In order to fund the necessary repairs, the BMX track had to sell fireworks and partner with other companies. As part of the repair and refurbishment the track worked with a BMX expert help rebuild the course to the standards of the organization. The BMX track had its grand re-opening in Mid-July of that year.

Many of the sports are occasionally hosted in the Case Community Park through a youth sports program for the community. Which the park receives privileged use of the park space for each operational sport.

== Parks and recreation ==
Case Community Center is a 26,000-square-foot multi-purpose facility capable of hosting a variety of events, and includes a variety of amenities such as basketball, walking track, weight equipment, table tennis, and gaming stations.

Case Community Park includes walking trails, family park areas, a bmx track, a skate park, and splash pads.

The Keystone Ancient Forest features hiking trails in a classic Oklahoma cross timbers forest with 500-year-old cedars and 300-year-old post oak trees, all inside a 1,360-acre nature preserve owned by the City of Sand Springs and protected by a conservation easement held by The Nature Conservancy. As of 2021, the Forest had a newly opened million-dollar visitor center, an additional walking trail, and expanded hiking hours. On July 15, 2021, the Forest was the 138th overall, but the first in Oklahoma, to be inducted into the Old-Growth Forest Network, a national organization trying to preserve at least one forest in every county in the United States that can sustain a forest, estimated to be 2,370 counties.

The Canyons at Blackjack Ridge is a public 18-hole golf course and driving range in the hills north of Sand Springs.

Sand Springs Senior Citizens Center provides games of pool, bingo, cards, and even dances for senior citizens. Free lunches are provided weekdays.

The Sand Springs Cultural and Historical Museum is located in the historic art-deco Page Memorial Library Building, and promotes cultural heritage and the arts.

Keystone State Park and Keystone Lake are immediately to the west of town.

Skiatook Lake is immediately to the north of town.

== Historical sites ==
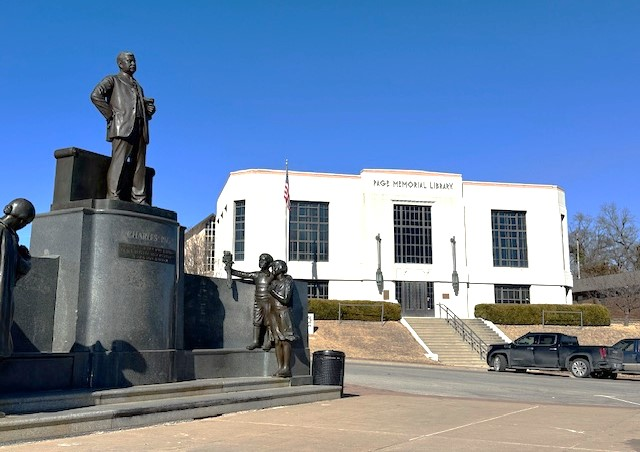
Page Memorial Library in 2-2026; Charles Page stature is in left foreground

The following are NRHP-listed sites in Sand Springs:

- Fort Arbuckle Site, a/k/a Old Fort Arbuckle (west of Sand Springs)
- Page Memorial Library (6 E. Broadway)
- Sand Springs Power Plant (221 S. Main St.)

== Transportation ==
US Route 412 and Oklahoma State Highway 51 are the major east–west highways through town. Oklahoma State Highway 97 runs north–south.

William R. Pogue Municipal Airport (ICAO identifier KOWP, FAA identifier OWP), owned by the City of Sand Springs, has a paved 5,800-foot-long by 100-foot-wide runway, that is located 4 miles northwest of the central business area of the city, and serves mostly general aviation aircraft.

For commercial air traffic, Tulsa International Airport is about a 20-minute drive to the east-northeast.

== Education ==
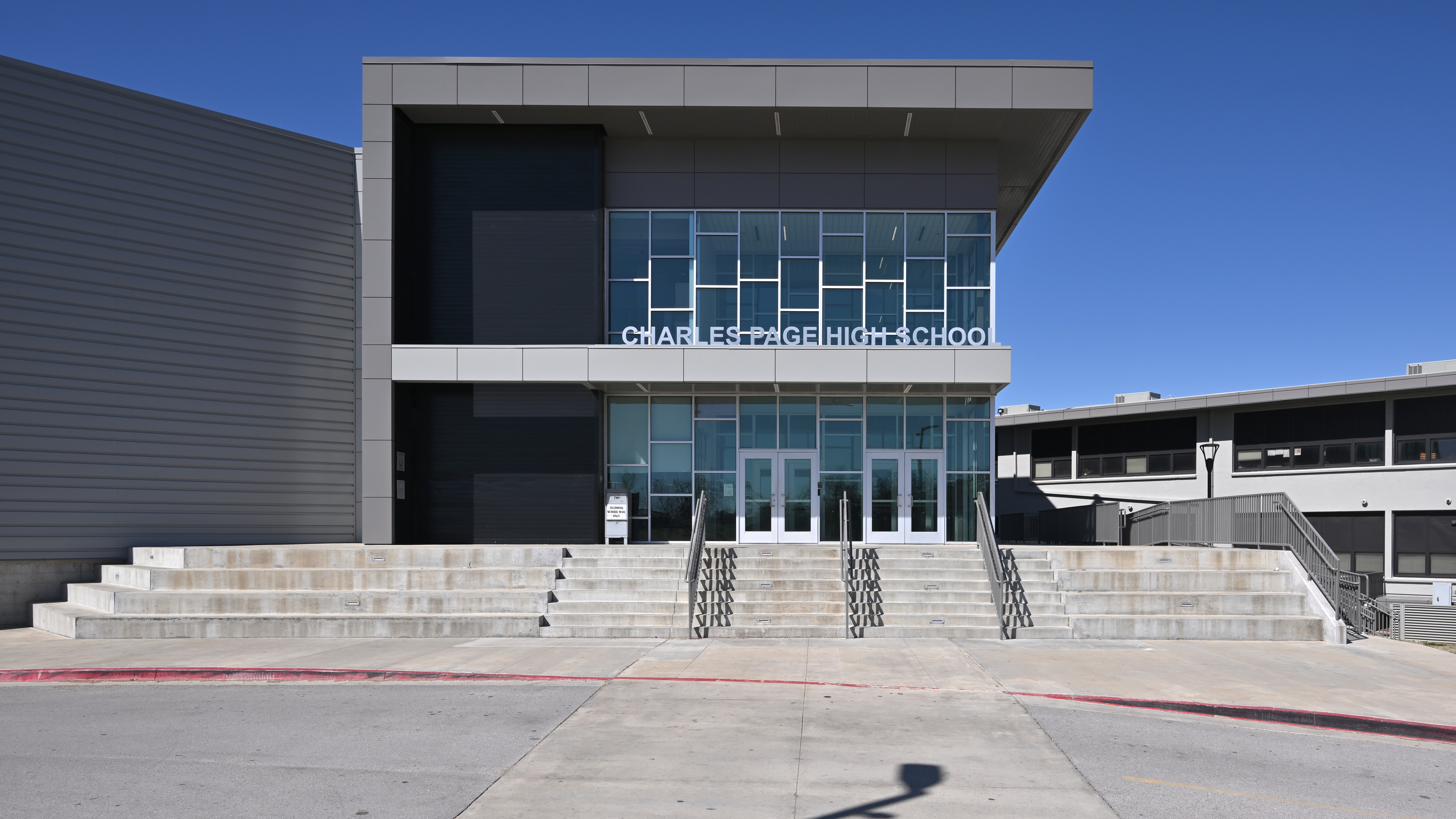
Main entrance to Charles Page High School

The Sand Springs Public School District is the largest employer in the city. It contains five elementary schools, one middle school, and two High Schools (one public and one private).

- Charles Page High School
- Clyde Boyd Middle School
- Charles Page High School Freshman Academy (Note: This building is a separate complex that is part of Charles Page High School)
- Angus Valley Elementary School
- Harry T. Pratt Elementary School
- Limestone Elementary School
- Garfield Elementary School
- Northwoods Elementary School
- Sixth Grade Center (Note: This building is a separate complex that is part of Clyde Boyd Middle School)
- Early Childhood Center
- Page Academy (alternative)

The portion in Osage County is in Sperry Public Schools.

There are also four private Christian schools in Sand Springs.

- Amazing Grace Christian Academy
- Heritage Baptist School
- Landmark Christian Academy
- Moriah Christian Academy

== Media ==
Sand Springs has one print newspaper, the Sand Springs Leader. It is published weekly on Thursday. On April 21, 2015, the Tulsa World announced that its parent company BH Media, a division of Berkshire Hathaway, the Omaha-based investment holding company led by billionaire Warren Buffett, had purchased several suburban newspapers, including the Sand Springs Leader.

Sand Springs also has an online-only news source, Sandite Pride News, which specializes in Sand Springs sports coverage.

== Notable people ==
- Jerry Adair (1936–1987), professional baseball player
- Michael Bowie (b. 1991), professional football player and 2013 Super Bowl winner
- Woody Crumbo (1912–1989), American Indian artist, flutist, and dancer
- Daton Fix (b. 1998), freestyle and folkstyle wrestler
- Amanda Frances, author and television personality
- Neal Hallford (b. 1966), game designer, author, and film producer
- Sam Harris (b. 1961), Tony-nominated actor and singer who was Male Vocalist champion of the first season of Star Search
- Marques Haynes (1926–2015), Harlem Globetrotters player
- Jadine Nollan (b. 1958), politician, Oklahoma House of Representatives from the 66th district since 2010
- Charles Page (1860–1926), oilman, founder of Sand Springs
- Cindy Pickett (b. 1947), actress
- William R. Pogue (1930–2014), Skylab astronaut, author, and pilot
- Robert D. Simms (1926–2008), native of Sand Springs, attorney, judge, associate justice of Oklahoma Supreme Court
- Mae Young (1923–2014), professional wrestler
