= William R. Pogue Municipal Airport =

Airport in Oklahoma, United States

- IATA: none; ICAO: KOWP; FAA LID: OWP

Summary
- Airport type: Public
- Owner: City of Sand Springs
- Serves: Sand Springs, Oklahoma
- Elevation AMSL: 892 ft (272 m)
- Coordinates: 36°10′31″N 096°09′07″W

Map
- Location of airport in Oklahoma OWP (the United States)

Runways
| Direction | Length | | Surface |
| Direction | ft | m | Surface |
|---|---|---|---|
| 17/35 | 5,799 | 1,768 | Asphalt |

Statistics (2012)
- Aircraft operations: 30,000
- Based aircraft: 51
- Source: Federal Aviation Administration

William R. Pogue Municipal Airport (ICAO: KOWP, FAA LID: OWP), also known as Pogue Airport, is a public use airport in Osage County, Oklahoma, United States. It is owned by the City of Sand Springs and located three nautical miles (6 km) northwest of its central business district. The airport is named after the astronaut William Reid Pogue (1930-2014), a native of Oklahoma. This airport is included in the National Plan of Integrated Airport Systems for 2011–2015, which categorized it as a general aviation facility.

Although many U.S. airports use the same three-letter location identifier for the FAA and IATA, this airport is assigned OWP by the FAA, but has no designation from the IATA.

== Facilities and aircraft ==
William R. Pogue Municipal Airport covers an area of 448 acres (181 ha) at an elevation of 892 feet (272 m) above mean sea level. It has one runway designated 17/35 with an asphalt surface measuring 5,799 by 100 feet (1,768 x 30 m).

For the 12-month period ending September 21, 2012, the airport had 30,000 aircraft operations, an average of 82 per day: 99.8% general aviation and 0.2% military. At that time there were 51 aircraft based at this airport: 76% single-engine, 22% multi-engine, and 2% helicopter.

== See also ==
- List of airports in Oklahoma
