= Oklahoma State University–Tulsa =

Extension campus of Oklahoma State University

Coordinates: 36°09′49″N 95°59′18″W

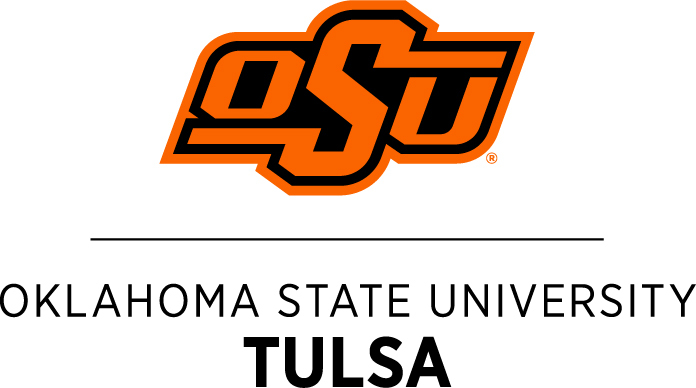
- Former names: University Center at Tulsa
- President: Johnny Stephens
- Location: Tulsa, Oklahoma, United States

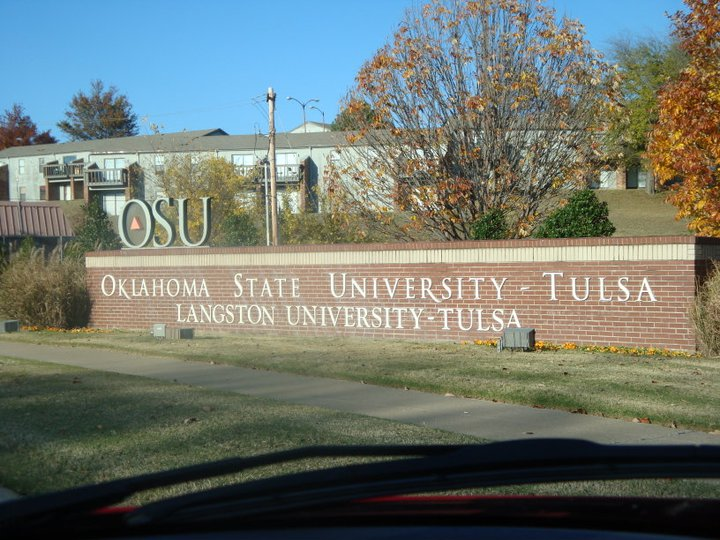

Oklahoma State University–Tulsa, located in Tulsa, Oklahoma, United States, is the newest institution of the Oklahoma State University System. It was previously the University Center at Tulsa until it became OSU-Tulsa on January 1, 1999. OSU-Tulsa is unique in the fact that it is not recognized as its own entity, but rather an extension of the main Oklahoma State University campus in Stillwater, Oklahoma. OSU-Tulsa works in conjunction with the main OSU campus and Tulsa Community College to provide freshman and sophomore-level courses, enabling students to complete a four-year undergraduate course of study. Pamela Martin Fry was named the institution's third president and first female president in 2019.

== History ==
As Tulsa lacked a four-year public university, the Tulsa Development Authority opened the University Center at Tulsa (UCAT) in 1986 on land north of Interstate 244. Specializing in graduate programs, UCAT was a collaborative venture between Langston University, Northeastern State University, the University of Oklahoma, and Oklahoma State University. In 1996, UCAT was renamed Rogers University.

In 1998, Governor Frank Keating signed into law SB 1426, a bill co-authored by State Senators Charles Ford and Betty Boyd "establishing Oklahoma State University/Tulsa as successor to Rogers University in Tulsa." Oklahoma State University–Tulsa officially opened on January 1, 1999.

== Academics ==
The Tulsa campus focuses on junior, senior and graduate level education, providing opportunities for individuals to complete bachelors, masters and doctoral degrees.

== Campus ==
The campus is located north of downtown Tulsa, in the historic Greenwood neighborhood. Tulsa facilities include traditional classrooms, distance-learning classrooms, computer labs, and a conference center area.

The Helmerich Advanced Technology Research Center (HATRC) is a recent campus addition. This 125,000-square-foot (11,600 m^{2}) engineering building is home to OSU's School of Materials Science and Engineering and has specialized labs for developing advanced materials targeted to local aerospace, biotechnology, and telecommunications, and manufacturing industries.
