= Keystone Lake =

Keystone Dam
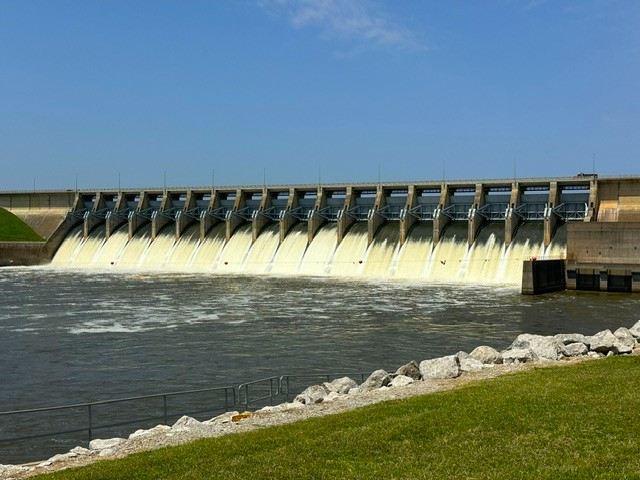
- Keystone Dam in July of 2026

- Location within Oklahoma Location within the United States
- Location: Pawnee / Osage / Creek / Tulsa counties, Oklahoma
- Coordinates: 36°13′50″N 96°18′18″W
- Primary inflows: Arkansas River
- Primary outflows: Arkansas River
- Basin countries: United States
- Surface area: 23,600 acres (9,600 ha)
- Average depth: 24 feet (7.3 m) (average)
- Max. depth: 73 feet (22 m)
- Water volume: 505,381 acre-feet (623,378,000 m^{3}) (normal)
- Shore length^{1}: 330 miles (530 km)
- Surface elevation: 723 feet (220 m) (normal), 706 feet (215 m) (min.), 754 feet (230 m) (max.)
- Settlements: Mannford, Sand Springs and Tulsa, Oklahoma
- ^{1} Shore length is not a well-defined measure.

Keystone Dam & Reservoir
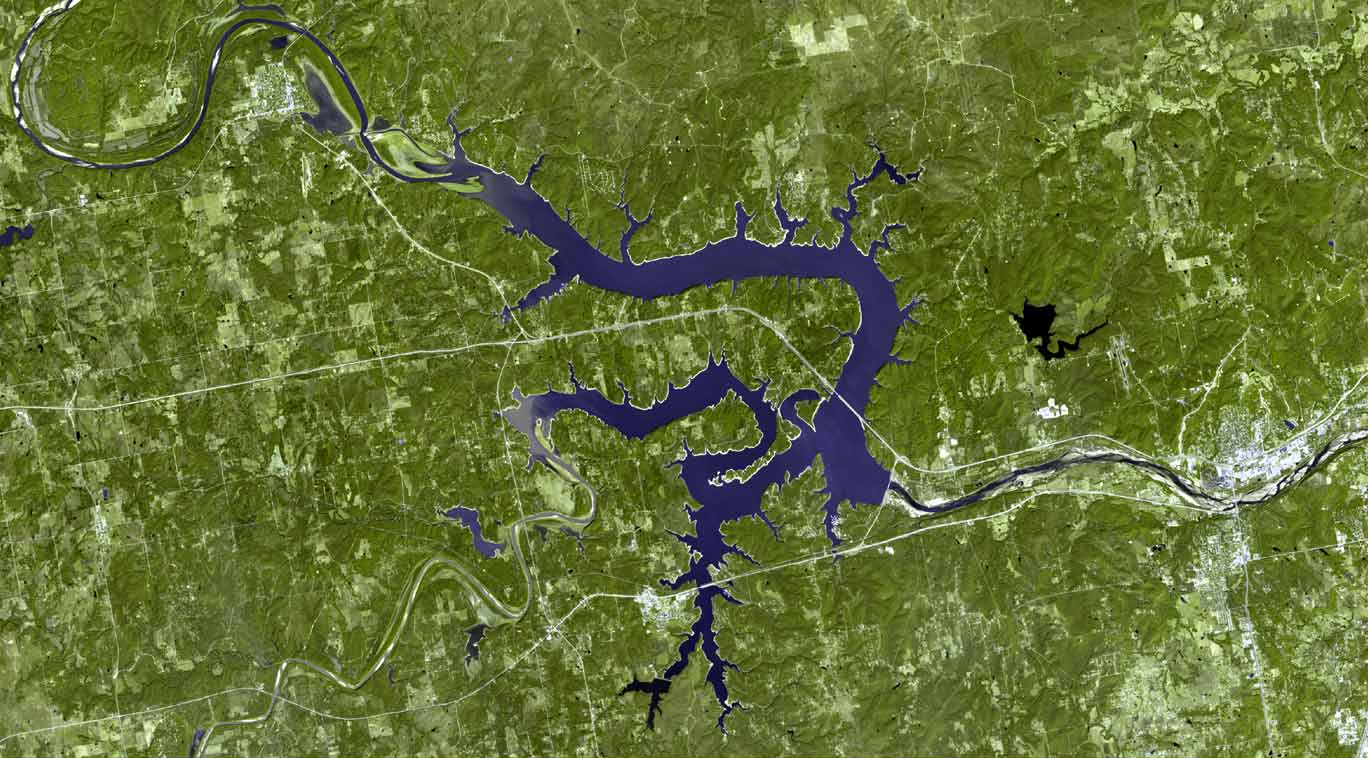
- Interactive map of Keystone Dam & Reservoir
- Country: United States
- Location: Oklahoma Pawnee / Osage / Creek / Tulsa counties, Oklahoma
- Purpose: Flood control, hydroelectric power generation, wildlife management and recreation
- Status: Operational
- Construction began: 1957
- Opening date: 1968

Dam and spillways
- Impounds: Arkansas River
- Length: 4,600 ft (1,400 m)
- Elevation at crest: 766 feet (max)
- Spillways: 1
- Spillway type: Gated ogee weir
- Spillway capacity: 939,000 cfs max.

Reservoir
- Surface area: 23,600 sq. ft.

Power Station
- Turbines: Hydraulic (2)
- Installed capacity: 35,000 KW each

Keystone Lake is a reservoir in northeastern Oklahoma on the Arkansas and Cimarron rivers. It is located upstream about 23 miles (37 km) from Tulsa. It was created in 1968 when the Keystone Dam was completed. The primary purposes are: flood control, hydroelectric power generation, wildlife management and recreation.

== General description ==
Keystone Lake is about 23,600 acres (96 km^{2}) in area, and was designed to contain 505,381 acre-feet (623,378,000 m^{3}) of water. It was named for the community of Keystone, which existed on the site from 1900 until 1962, when it was inundated by the waters of the lake. (Note: The community had been given its name early in the 20th Century because it was in a key location at the confluence of the Cimarron and Arkansas Rivers.) Construction of the lake forced the relocation of three other towns: Mannford, Oklahoma (also known as New Mannford by locals), Prue (also known as New Prue), and Appalachia Bay, Oklahoma. The town of Osage was partially abandoned to the lake, while the rest clings to the south shore. Engineers built a levee around low-lying areas of the south and east sides of Cleveland, Oklahoma to prevent flooding of that city. The shoreline extends for 330 miles (530 km).

Two Oklahoma state parks, Keystone State Park and Walnut Creek State Park, are located along the shores of the lake offering camping, hiking and biking trails, fishing, swimming and boating opportunities. The area also features a Yogi Bear's Jellystone Park Camp-Resort as you cross the Keystone Dam near Sand Springs.

The Keystone Lake project was authorized by the Flood Control Act of 1950. It was designed and built by the Tulsa District, Army Corps of Engineers. Construction began in January 1957 and was complete for flood control purposes in September 1964. Commercial operation of the power generating facility began in May 1968.

A reregulating dam, located 7.8 miles (12.6 km) downstream of the main dam, was also completed in 1968. Cost of the total project was approximately $123 million. In 1986, the reregulating dam was removed due to public safety issues, as 16 people had drowned at the dam.

== Dam construction details ==
The dam was actually constructed across the Arkansas River, downstream of the confluence with the Cimarron River. It is built of rolled earthfill material. Maximum height of the dam is 121 feet (37 m) above the stream bed. The total length of the dam is 4,600 feet (1,400 m), including a 1,600 feet (490 m)-long concrete section. The spillway in the concrete section is 856 feet (261 m) wide. The non-overflow part of the concrete section includes a power intake structure. State Highway 151 crosses the dam, connecting State Highway 51 on the south with U.S. Highway 64 on the north.

The spillway is a gated ogee weir, 720 feet (220 m) wide with eighteen tainter gates, each 40 by 35 feet (12 by 11 m). Spillway capacity at the maximum pool level (elevation 766.0 feet (233.5 m)) is 939,000 cubic feet per second (26,600 m^{3}/s). Capacity at the top of the flood control pool level (elevation 754.0 feet (229.8 m)) is 565,000 cubic feet per second (16,000 m^{3}/s). The spillway also has nine sluices, each 5.67 by 10 feet (1.73 by 3.05 m).

The power intake structure is between the spillway and the left non-overflow section of the dam. It includes two penstocks, each 27 feet (8.2 m) diameter and controlled by two 14 by 30 feet (4.3 by 9.1 m) gates. The power generation facility includes two hydroelectric generators, each rated at 35,000 kW (47,000 hp).

== Largest release in service ==
In September and October 1986, Keystone Lake was filled to capacity when the remnants of Hurricane Paine entered Oklahoma and dropped nearly 22 inches (0.56 m) of water into the Cimarron and Arkansas rivers northwest of the lake, requiring the Corps of Engineers to release water downstream at a rate of 310,000 cubic feet per second (8,800 m^{3}/s), which made downstream flooding inevitable. As a result, a private levee in West Tulsa failed, causing more than $1.3 million in damages.

== Recreation ==
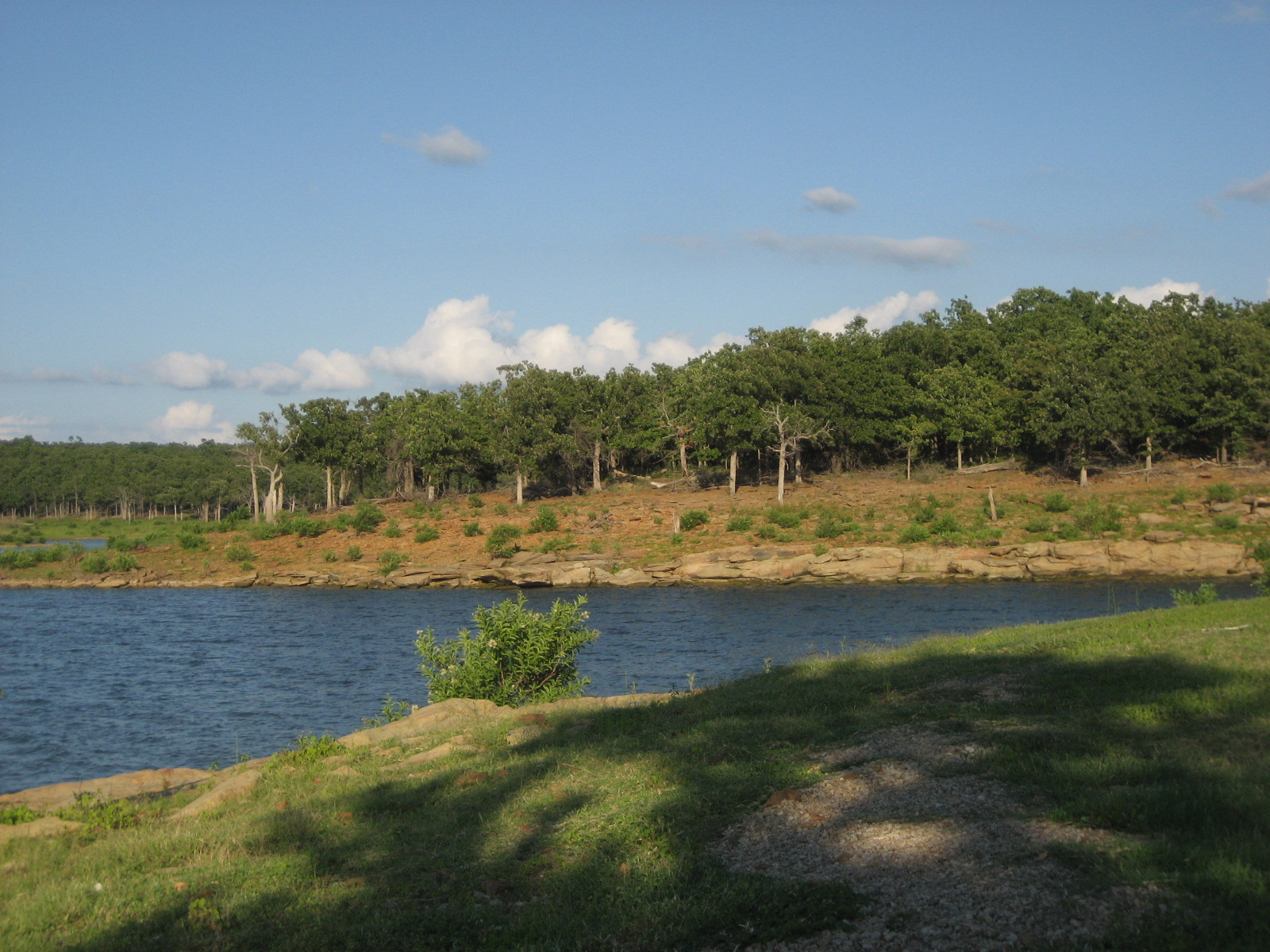
View of Keystone Lake

According to the Corps of Engineers website, Keystone Lake has 16 recreational areas (including 3 alcohol-free beaches), 11 boat ramps, 4 marinas and 2 off-road vehicle areas. There are also campgrounds, a waterfowl refuge and a public hunting area. Keystone State Park nearby offers cabins. Fishing is popular, with the most plentiful species being striped bass, white bass, black bass, small mouth bass, crappie, and catfish. Fauna around the lake include: white-tailed deer, raccoon, bobcat, coyote, beaver, squirrel, cottontail rabbit, quail, dove, ducks and geese. Hunting and fishing licenses are regulated by Oklahoma and Federal laws.

Windycrest Sailing Club offers sailboat racing and cruising.
