= Mannford, Oklahoma =

City in Oklahoma, US

- City
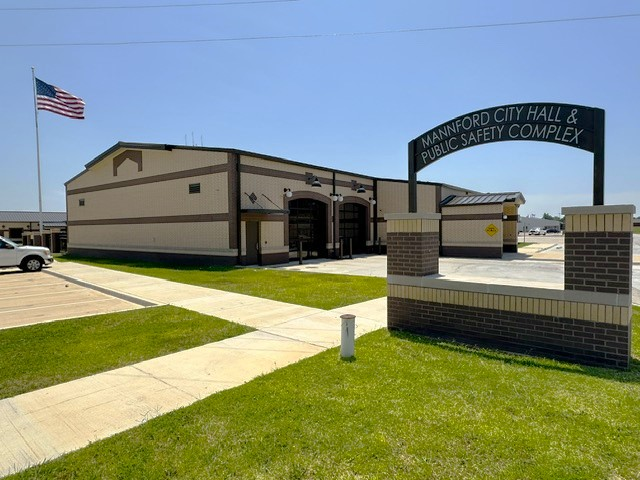
- Part of Mannford City Hall and Public Safety Complex, 2026

- Seal
- Nickname: "Striped Bass Capital of the World"
- Motto: "Growing Boon of the Lake"
- Location within Creek County and Oklahoma

- Location within Oklahoma Location within the United States
- Coordinates: 36°07′50″N 96°20′03″W
- Country: United States
- State: Oklahoma
- County: Creek
- Established: 1903

Government
  - Town administrator: Gerald Haury

Area
  - Total: 9.68 sq mi (25.06 km^{2})
  - Land: 7.54 sq mi (19.52 km^{2})
  - Water: 2.14 sq mi (5.54 km^{2})
- Elevation: 722 ft (220 m)

Population (2020)
  - Total: 3,262
  - Density: 432.8/sq mi (167.1/km^{2})
- Time zone: UTC-6 (Central (CST))
  - Summer (DST): UTC-5 (CDT)
- ZIP code: 74044
- Area codes: 539/918
- FIPS code: 40-46200
- GNIS feature ID: 2412944
- Website: cityofmannford.com

Mannford is a city in Creek County, Oklahoma, United States. Its population was 3,262 at the time of the 2020 census, up from 3,076 in 2010. The city sits next to Keystone Lake and claims to be the "Striped Bass Capital of the World".

Small strips of land that are within the city limits extend into Osage, Pawnee, and Tulsa Counties.

== History ==
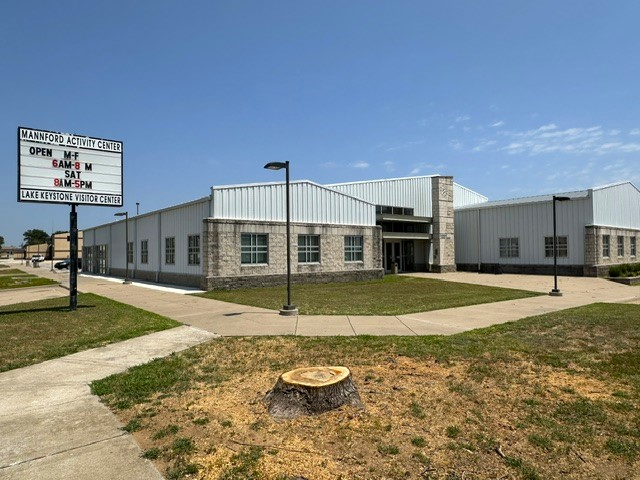
The Mannford Activity Center and Lake Keystone Visitor Center, 2026

The town name is derived from "Mann's Ford", a crossing of the Cimarron River where Tom and Hazel Mann had received a Creek allotment. The Arkansas Valley and Western Railroad (later the St. Louis and San Francisco Railroad (commonly called "Frisco") built a line through this area in 1902–03, making it an important cattle-shipping point. A post office was established April 11, 1903.

When the U.S. Army Corps of Engineers began making plans for flood control that would flood the town of Mannford, citizens formed a plan to relocate several miles southeast of the original site. The move was completed in 1963.

On August 3, 2012, a wildfire started several miles south of Mannford. Carried by strong south winds and extremely dry vegetation, the fire pushed up into the Mannford area and caused evacuations of the town. The fire burned over 78 square miles (200 km^{2}), edging into the town and destroying dozens of buildings.

== Geography ==
Mannford is 22 miles (35 km) west of Tulsa on State Highway 51. It is situated on both sides of a southwest arm of Keystone Lake, a reservoir on the Arkansas and Cimarron Rivers. Most of the developed part of the town is on the west side of the lake arm, which fills the valley of Salt Creek.

According to the United States Census Bureau, the town has a total area of 8.9 square miles (23.0 km^{2}), of which 2.0 square miles (5.2 km^{2}), or 22.53%, are covered by water.

== Demographics ==
Historical population
Census	Pop.	Note	%±
1930	421		—
1940	403		−4.3%
1950	426		5.7%
1960	358		−16.0%
1970	892		149.2%
1980	1,610		80.5%
1990	1,826		13.4%
2000	2,095		14.7%
2010	3,076		46.8%
2020	3,262		6.0%

As of the 2000 census, 2,095 people, 783 households, and 583 families resided in the town. The population density was 389.8 inhabitants per square mile (150.5/km^{2}). The 865 housing units had an average density of 160.9 per square mile (62.1/km^{2}). The racial makeup of the town was 91.31% White, 0.10% African American, 4.39% |Native American, 0.24% Asian, 0.24% Pacific Islander, 0.29% from other races, and 3.44% from two or more races. Hispanics or Latinos of any race were 1.43% of the population.

Of the 783 households, 38.3% had children under 18 living with them, 58.5% were married couples living together, 11.7% had a female householder with no husband present, and 25.5% were not families. About 23.1% of all households were made up of individuals, and 10.9% had someone living alone who was 65 or older. The average household size was 2.57, and the average family size was 3.45.

In the town, the age distribution was 28.4% under 18, 7.2% from 18 to 24, 28.2% from 25 to 44, 22.0% from 45 to 64, and 14.3% who were 65 or older. The median age was 36 years. For every 100 females, there were 89.8 males. For every 100 females 18 and over, there were 85.5 males.

The median income in the town for a household was $34,306 and for a family was $41,750. Males had a median income of $32,991 versus $20,625 for females. The per capita income for the town was $17,722. About 6.5% of families and 8.5% of the population were below the poverty line, including 6.5% of those under 18 and 13.2% of those 65 or over.

About 99% of the employed residents commuted to work in Sand Springs and Tulsa during 2000.

The town currently has 19 churches.

== Economy ==
In 2012, the city of Mannford contracted with Rickey Hayes of Retail Attractions to provide economic development consulting, due to retail leakage to surrounding communities. A marina, a floating restaurant, improved campgrounds, new housing, and expanded industrial and commercial venues are currently all in development. Mannford's largest employer is the public school system, followed by Webco Industries and Care Fusion.

== Education ==
The Mannford Public Schools district covers residential areas of Mannford. It has five schools that include the Early Childhood Center, two elementary schools, a middle school, and a high school, and serves 1,486 students. Mannford High School offers a variety of extracurricular activities. These activities include speech and debate, band, academic team, FFA, and many other extracurricular programs.

== Media ==
Mannford had one newspaper, the Mannford Reporter, which is no longer in regular circulation. The paper was a free paper published every other Wednesday. It is owned by C.L. Harmon. In the December 7, 2011 the Eagle, the previous newspaper, announced that it was "merging" with the Sand Springs Leader (owned by Community Publishers) and no longer delivering a Mannford Eagle paper. This is when Harmon stepped in and started providing The Mannford Reporter.

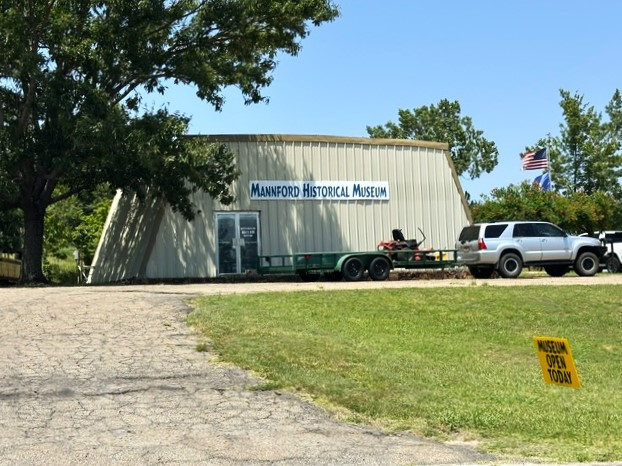
Mannford Historical Museum in July of 2026

== Museum ==
The Mannford Historical Museum or the Mannford Museum is a project of the Keystone Crossroads Historical Society, and it houses an eclectic collection including relics of the old towns of Mannford, Keystone, and Prue, which were all submerged by Keystone Lake.

== Notable people ==
- Lee Hazlewood, a country and pop singer, songwriter, and record producer, was born here.
