= National Register of Historic Places listings in Rogers County, Oklahoma =

Location of Rogers County in Oklahoma

This is a list of the National Register of Historic Places listings in Rogers County, Oklahoma.

This is intended to be a complete list of the properties and districts on the National Register of Historic Places in Rogers County, Oklahoma, United States. The locations of National Register properties and districts for which the latitude and longitude coordinates are included below, may be seen in a map.

There are 20 properties and districts listed on the National Register in the county.

This National Park Service list is complete through NPS recent listings posted September 25, 2026.

== Current listings ==
	Name on the Register	Image	Date listed	Location	City or town	Description
1	I.W.W. Beck Building	I.W.W. Beck Building	September 10, 1999 (#99001086)	146 W. Cooweescoowee Ave. 36°26′50″N 95°42′31″W	Oologah	
2	The Belvidere	The Belvidere	March 24, 1982 (#82003696)	109 N. Chickasaw Ave. 36°18′39″N 95°36′37″W	Claremore	
3	Chelsea Motel	Chelsea Motel	May 27, 2004 (#04000525)	Junction of 1st and State Highway 66; 36°32′15″N 95°25′33″W	Chelsea	
4	Claremore Auto Dealership		February 23, 1995 (#95000042)	625 W. Will Rogers Boulevard; 36°18′46″N 95°37′02″W	Claremore	
5	Downtown Claremore Historic District	Downtown Claremore Historic District	September 12, 2016 (#16000623)	W. Will Rogers Blvd. bounded by Rt. 66, Muskogee Ave., 4th St. & alley between W. Will Rogers Blvd. & 2nd St. 36°18′43″N 95°36′53″W	Claremore	
6	Eastern University Preparatory School	Eastern University Preparatory School	February 19, 1982 (#82003697)	College Hill; 36°19′12″N 95°38′07″W	Claremore	
7	Foyil Filling Station	Foyil Filling Station	December 8, 2015 (#15000875)	12243 S. Andy Payne Blvd. 36°26′03″N 95°31′12″W	Foyil	
8	Ed Galloway's Totem Pole Park	Ed Galloway's Totem Pole Park	March 30, 1999 (#99000354)	State Highway 28A, 3.5 miles east of the former U.S. Route 66; 36°26′14″N 95°26′53″W	Foyil	
9	Hanes Home	Hanes Home	July 12, 1982 (#82003700)	Off State Highway 88; 36°22′22″N 95°39′46″W	Sageeyah	Located on 445 Road, one mile west of old Oklahoma HW 88.
10	Hogue House	Hogue House	December 17, 1982 (#82001498)	1001 S. Olive St. 36°31′52″N 95°26′03″W	Chelsea	
11	Mendenhall's Bath House		March 23, 1983 (#83002127)	601 E. 7th St. 36°18′39″N 95°36′02″W	Claremore	No longer extant per Google Street View.
12	Maurice Meyer Barracks	Maurice Meyer Barracks	March 1, 1982 (#82003698)	College Hill; 36°19′08″N 95°38′07″W	Claremore	
13	Oologah Bank	Oologah Bank	May 10, 1982 (#82003699)	105 S. Maple St. 36°26′48″N 95°42′35″W	Oologah	
14	Oologah Pump	Oologah Pump	December 17, 1982 (#82001499)	Maple and Cooweescoowee Sts. 36°26′48″N 95°42′35″W	Oologah	
15	Pryor Creek Bridge	Pryor Creek Bridge	September 6, 2006 (#06000796)	Carries 1st St. over Pryor Creek, southwest of its junction with State Highway 66; 36°32′18″N 95°24′54″W	Chelsea	
16	Will Rogers Birthplace	Will Rogers Birthplace	September 29, 1970 (#70000538)	About 4 miles northeast of Oologah; 36°28′10″N 95°39′26″W	Oologah	
17	Will Rogers Hotel	Will Rogers Hotel	December 29, 1994 (#94001508)	524 W. Will Rogers Boulevard; 36°18′45″N 95°36′55″W	Claremore	
18	Will Rogers Memorial Library	Will Rogers Memorial Library	November 3, 2023 (#100009400)	121 North Weenonah Ave. 36°18′41″N 95°36′40″W	Claremore	Now the Claremore Museum of History (MoH)
19	Verdigris Club Lodge	Verdigris Club Lodge	September 2, 2003 (#03000876)	27795 S. Skelly Dr. 36°12′43″N 95°37′44″W	Catoosa	

== See also ==
- List of National Historic Landmarks in Oklahoma
- National Register of Historic Places listings in Oklahoma
