= Oklahoma State Highway 66 =

Highway in Oklahoma

State Highway 66

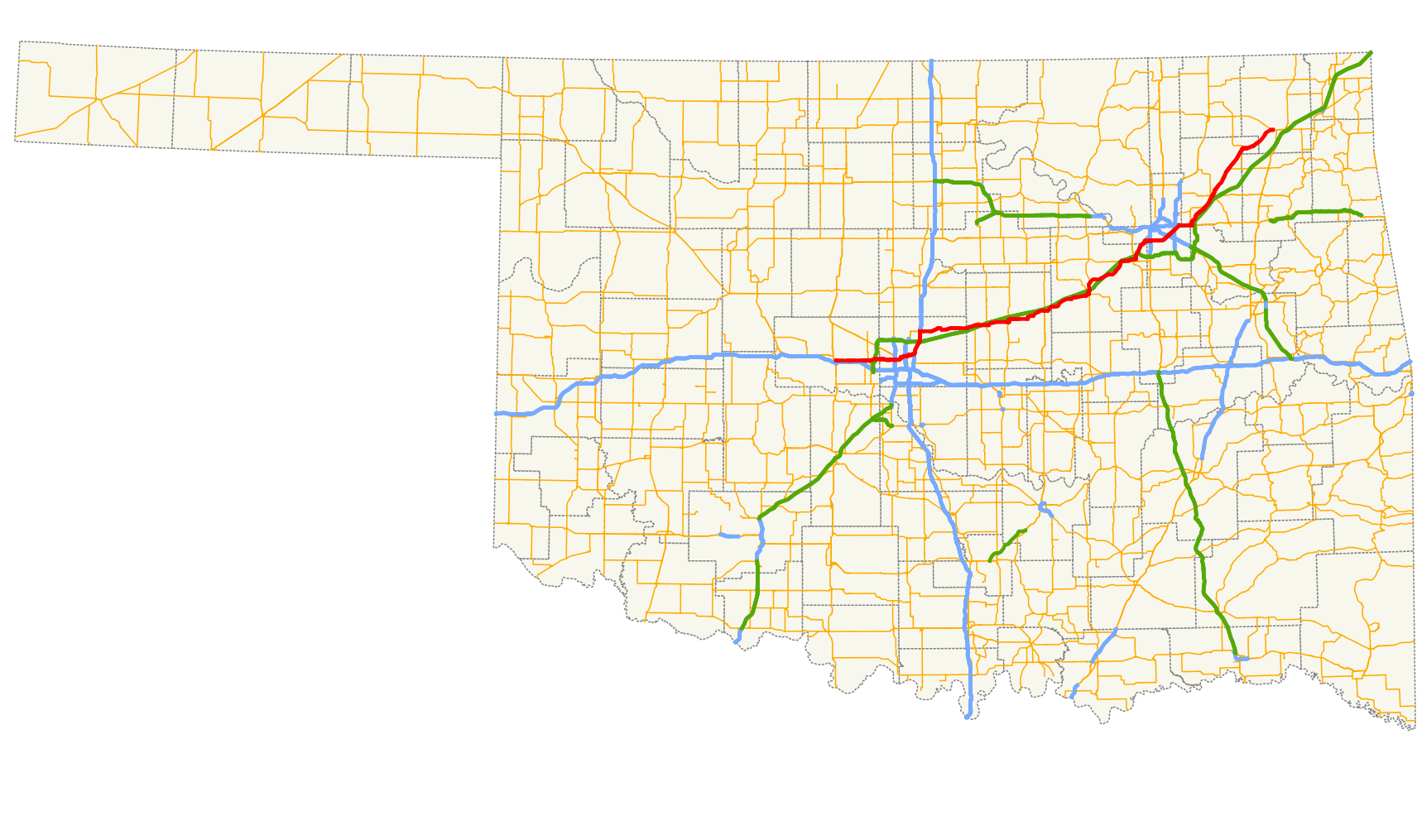

Route information
- Maintained by ODOT
- Length: 192.7 mi (310.1 km)
- Existed: April 1, 1985–present

Major junctions
- West end: I-40 BL / US 81 in El Reno
- I-344 / Kilpatrick Turnpike near Yukon; I-44 / SH-3 in Oklahoma City; I-235 / US 77 in Oklahoma City; I-35 from Oklahoma City to Edmond; Creek Turnpike in Sapulpa; I-244 in Sapulpa; US 75 in Tulsa; I-244 / US 412 in Tulsa; I-44 / US 412 in Catoosa
- East end: US 60 east of White Oak

Location
- Country: United States
- State: Oklahoma

Highway system
- Oklahoma State Highway System; Interstate; US; State; Turnpikes
| ← US 66 | → SH-67 |

State Highway 66 (abbreviated SH-66) is a 192.7-mile (310.1 km) state highway in the U.S. state of Oklahoma, beginning at U.S. Highway 81 in El Reno and ending at U.S. Highway 60 near White Oak. The highway was designated in 1985 as a replacement for the decommissioned U.S. Highway 66. Although most of the highway follows Historic Route 66, the highway follows US 66's final alignment, joining Interstate 44 through Tulsa and Oklahoma City, while older versions of the route follow various city streets through both cities.

The highway has retained its importance for most of its length as it offers a non-tolled alternative to the Turner and Will Rogers Turnpikes which carry Interstate 44 between Oklahoma City and the Missouri state line.

SH-66 currently has one spur route, designated SH-66B, in Wellston.

== Route description ==
=== Western terminus and Oklahoma City area ===
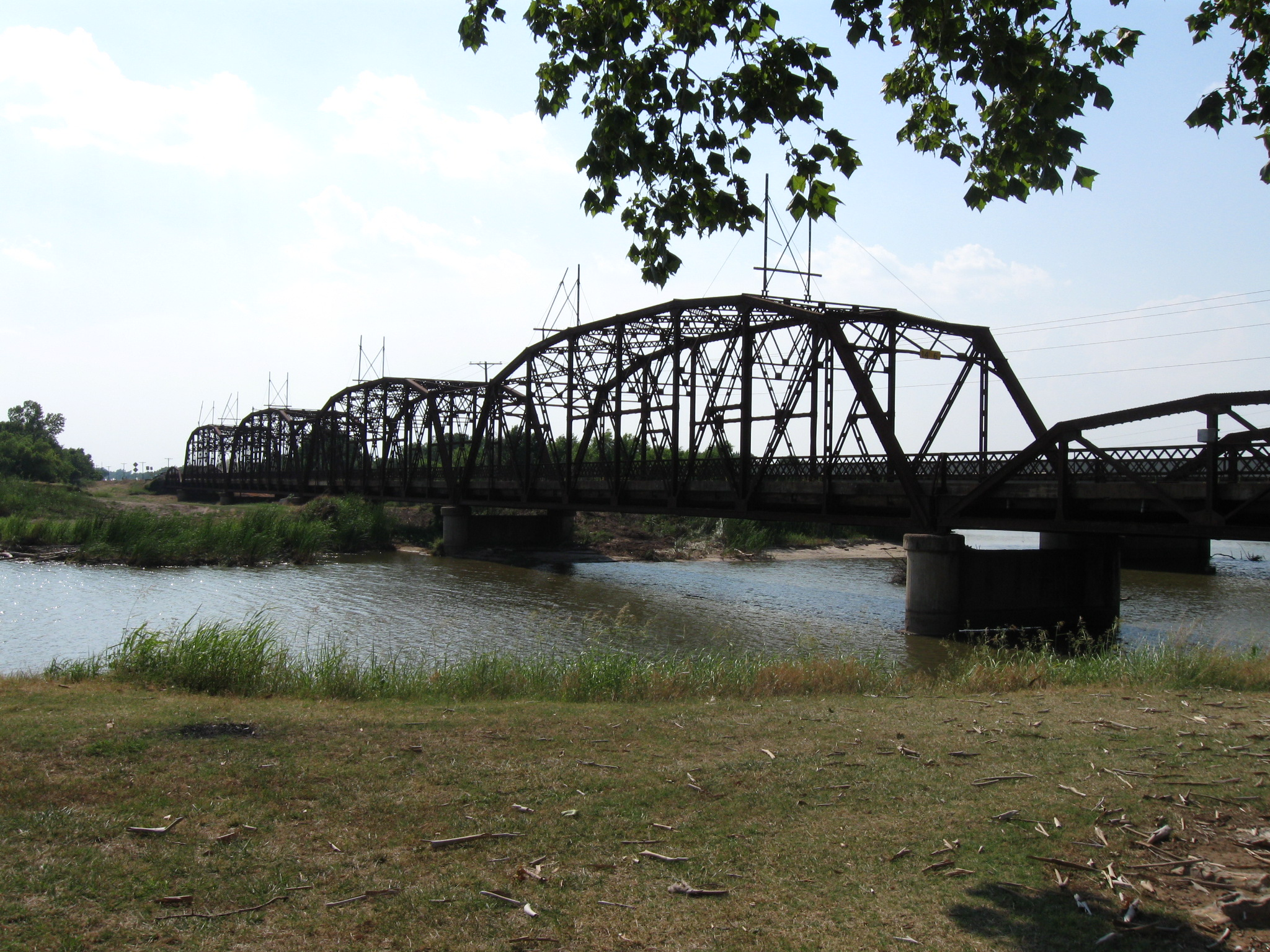
Former US-66 bridge over the North Canadian River in Oklahoma City

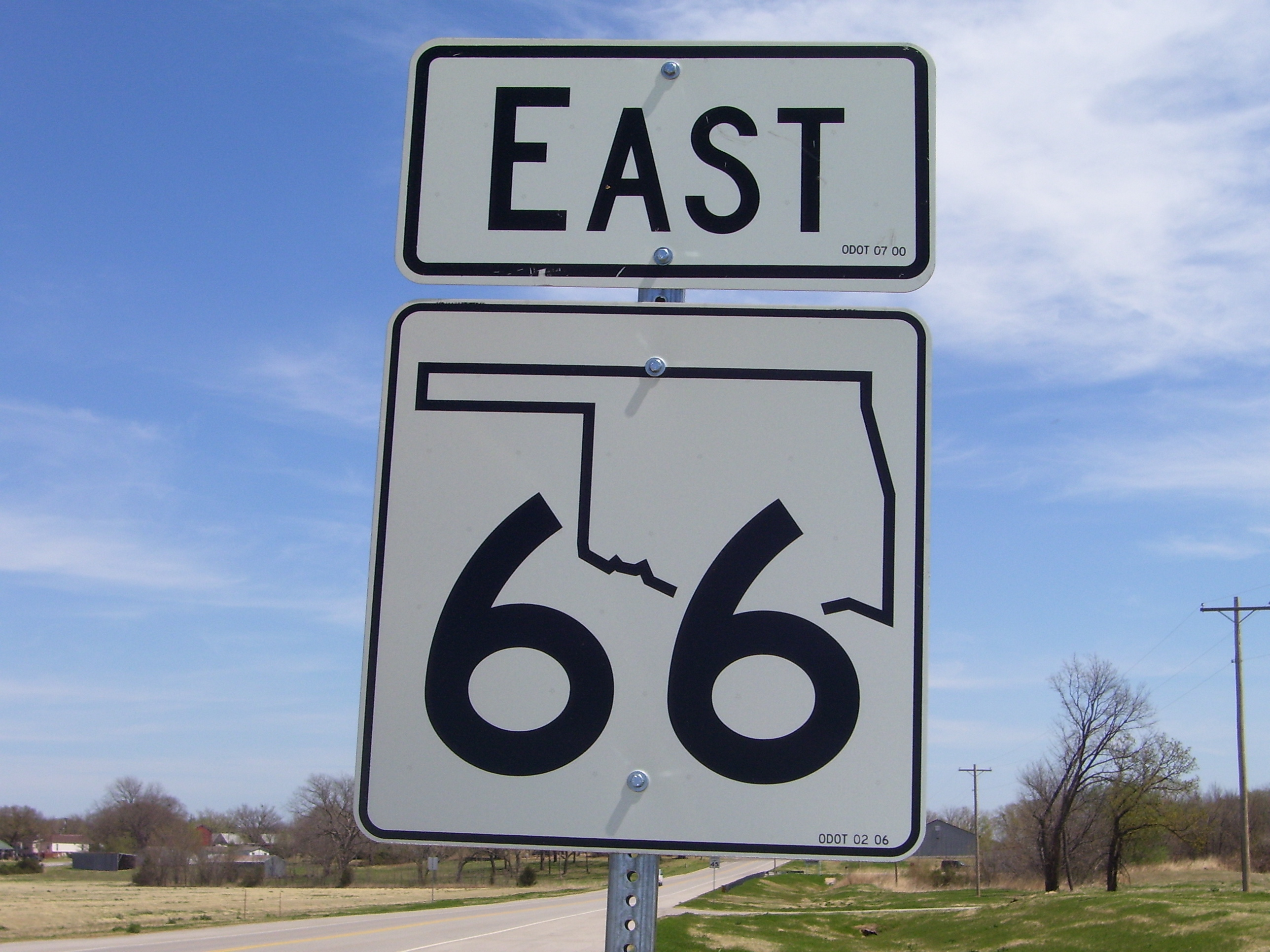
SH-66 shield west of Arcadia

State Highway 66 begins at Business I-40 in El Reno (another old Route 66 segment), concurrent at this point with US-81. From this intersection, the highway heads due east. The highway briefly passes through a rural area after leaving El Reno, before transitioning into the Oklahoma City suburb of Yukon. In Yukon, the route runs along Main Street, and has a short concurrency with SH-4. SH-66 continues east, passing into Oklahoma City, where it becomes N.W. 39th Expressway. SH-66 has an interchange with the Kilpatrick Turnpike on the far west edge of the city. The highway passes just to the north of Lake Overholser. Near where the road crosses over the North Canadian River, the inlet to the lake, it crosses from Canadian County into Oklahoma County.

N.W. 39th Expressway, still carrying SH-66, forms the main street of both Bethany and Warr Acres, two enclave suburbs of Oklahoma City. The street passes just to the south of Wiley Post Airport and provides access to Southern Nazarene University. After leaving Warr Acres, the highway re-enters Oklahoma City. SH-66 leaves N.W. 39th Expressway at an interchange with I-44 and SH-3/SH-74 (the Lake Hefner Parkway). SH-66 begins a concurrency with eastbound I-44, and for the remainder of its length, it will stay close to the interstate.

SH-66 is unsigned through its time on the Oklahoma City freeway system. I-44, while concurrent with SH-66, runs along the north side of Oklahoma City, passing just south of Penn Square Mall, and meets Interstate 235 at a cloverleaf interchange at its northern terminus (north of the interchange, US-77 continues on as a freeway, the Broadway Extension). I-44 and SH-66 begin a concurrency with I-35 near Remington Park. The two interstates and the state highway head north through the northeast part of the city. At Hefner Road, the routes pass near the Frontier City amusement park. The highways then encounter an interchange which is the eastern terminus of the Kilpatrick Turnpike. This interchange is also where I-44 splits off to form the Turner Turnpike.

I-35 and SH-66 leave Oklahoma City and enter the suburb of Edmond. On the north side of town, SH-66 exits the interstate, while US-77 joins it. SH-66 continues east out of town, providing access to Arcadia Lake. The highway then passes through the town of Arcadia, home of the Round Barn, a Route 66 landmark. The highway then serves Luther before exiting Oklahoma County.

=== Lincoln and Creek Counties ===
Oklahoma 66 in Kellyville

On the west side of Lincoln County, SH-66 produces a business loop to Wellston, SH-66B (below). Just beyond this junction, SH-66 serves as the northern terminus of SH-102. The highway continues east, meeting up again with SH-66B on the east side of Wellston. Near this junction, SH-66 has an interchange with the Turner Turnpike (still carrying I-44). The route continues to parallel the turnpike as it comes to an intersection with US-177. East of this junction, SH-66 passes through the town of Warwick, where it crosses the Deep Fork of the Canadian River.

On the southwest side of Chandler, the county seat of Lincoln County, the route is joined by SH-18. The two routes turn north, passing through the core of the downtown area. On the north side of downtown, SH-66 splits off to the east. Seven miles (11 km) east of Chandler, the highway passes through the town of Davenport. The route next encounters Stroud, where SH-66 intersects State Highway 99 and US-377, which may serve as the northern terminus of US-377.

East of Stroud, SH-66 passes into Creek County. The highway passes through the town of Depew 10 miles (16 km) northeast of Stroud. The route next passes through Bristow, where it has a brief concurrency with SH-16 and begins a more lengthy one with SH-48. SH-48/66 exit Bristow to the north, with an interchange where they cross the Turner Turnpike. Near unincorporated Bellvue, SH-66 splits away from SH-48 and turns back to the northeast. The highway crosses the Turner Turnpike again, then runs through Kellyville. Four miles (6.4 km) northeast of Kellyville, the highway begins a concurrency with SH-33. SH-33 and SH-66 will remain signed together as they enter the Tulsa metropolitan area.

=== Tulsa area ===
SH-33/66 next enter Sapulpa, the county seat of Creek County and a suburb of Tulsa. In Sapulpa, the two highways serve as the western terminus of SH-117. They then come to the intersection of Dewey Avenue and Main Street in downtown Sapulpa, where SH-33 ends. This intersection also serves as the southern terminus of SH-97. SH-66 continues east through the intersection, joined by US-75 ALT. The two highways intersect SH-117A at its northern terminus, and turn left to continue its alignment. US-75 ALT/SH-66 parallel the Turner Turnpike within sight distance for the remainder of their journey in Creek County. Near the Creek–Tulsa County line, the Turner Turnpike ends, and SH-66 merges onto the now toll-free I-44. US-75 ALT ends at the merge.

I-44/SH-66 cut diagonally through the city of Tulsa. In West Tulsa, Interstate 244 branches off to serve the downtown area. I-44/SH-66 follow the Skelly Drive through midtown. The highways interchange with the Okmulgee Beeline, the US-75 freeway before crossing the Arkansas River. The next freeway interchange is with the Broken Arrow Expressway, carrying US-64 and SH-51, followed by the Mingo Valley Expressway, carrying US-169 I-244 then merges with I-44 at its eastern terminus. I-44/SH-66 cross into Rogers County and the suburb of Catoosa, serving as the southern terminus of SH-167. SH-66 then splits off from I-44, initially following an old alignment of the Interstate where it transitioned into the Will Rogers Turnpike. SH-66 then downgrades to an expressway as it passes through Catoosa, home of the Blue Whale. Northeast of Catoosa, near Verdigris, SH-66 intersects SH-266 at its eastern terminus.

=== Northeast Oklahoma ===
The next town that SH-66 serves after leaving the Tulsa area is Claremore, seat of Rogers County. In Claremore, SH-66 has brief concurrencies with SH-20 and SH-88. The highway continues northeast through Rogers County, bypassing Sequoyah to the west and serving as the western terminus of SH-28A in Foyil. The highway passes through Bushyhead 2 miles (3.2 km) northeast of Foyil, and then intersect SH-28 in Chelsea 5 miles (8.0 km) further northeast. The route then crosses into Craig County, where it serves the unincorporated place of White Oak. The SH-66 designation then comes to an end at US-60, which Route 66 historically followed into Vinita.

== History ==
The present-day SH-66 was established to fill the void left when US 66 was decommissioned through Oklahoma in the early 1980s. SH-66 was designated as its replacement from El Reno to White Oak on April 1, 1985. The remainder of US 66 in Oklahoma was overlapped by other highways, principally I-40 and US-69, so the SH-66 designation was not applied to these sections of highway.

On July 1, 1991, SH-66 was realigned in the vicinity of Luther. No further changes to the SH-66 designation have occurred since that time. Planned improvements by the Oklahoma Department of Transportation include reconstruction and widening of SH-66 from two to four lanes from Edmond to the Lincoln County line.

As part of a project to widen I-235 and US-77 to accommodate the increase amount of traffic, its interchange with I-44/SH-66 was reconstructed from a cloverleaf interchange to a four-level interchange that eliminated two cloverleaf ramps. The other two cloverleafs were widened and reconstructed and two new flyover ramps were added. The four-level interchange is the first of its kind in Oklahoma. The $105 million project lasted three years and was opened on March 3, 2022. An additional $16 million is being provided to reconstruct the I-44 to US-77 ramp and provide a direct connection to North Lincoln Boulevard. The project is expected to be started in 2023.

== SH-66B ==
State Highway 66B
- Location: Wellston
- Length: 3.26 mi (5.25 km)
- Existed: June 26, 1934–present

While US 66 was still active, the SH-66 designation was given to a loop route through Wellston. This incarnation of SH-66 effectively served as a Wellston business loop for US 66. This route was first established on June 26, 1934. SH-66B is 3.26 miles (5.25 km) long.

== Junction list ==
| County | Location | mi | km | Exit | Destinations | Notes |
|---|---|---|---|---|---|---|
| Canadian | El Reno | 0.0 | 0.0 | | I-40 BL / US 81 to I-40 – Lucky Star Casino, Downtown, Lake, Golf Course, Sports Complex | Western terminus; road continues as I-40 Bus. west/US-81 north (former US 66 west) |
| Canadian | Yukon | 11.0 | 17.7 | | SH-4 north (Cornwell Drive) | Western end of SH-4 concurrency |
| Canadian | Yukon | 11.2 | 18.0 | | SH-4 south (Ranchwood Boulevard) | Eastern end of SH-4 concurrency |
| Canadian | Oklahoma City | 13.6 | 21.9 | | I-344 Toll (Kilpatrick Turnpike) | Interchange |
| Oklahoma | Oklahoma City | 20.4 | 32.8 | — | I-44 west / SH-3 – Lawton | Eastbound exit and westbound entrance; west end of freeway |
| Oklahoma | Oklahoma City | 20.4 | 32.8 | — | SH-3 west / SH-74 north (Lake Hefner Parkway) | Left exit eastbound; Lake Hefner Pkwy. exit 123B |
| Oklahoma | Oklahoma City | 20.4 | 32.8 | — | I-44 west to I-40 – Lawton, Amarillo | Western end of I-44 concurrency; I-44 exit 123B |
| Oklahoma | Oklahoma City | | | 124 | N. May Avenue | Exit numbers follow I-44 |
| Oklahoma | Oklahoma City | | | 125A | N. Penn Avenue | Full name is "Pennsylvania" |
| Oklahoma | Oklahoma City | | | 125C | Northwest Expressway | No Eastbound exit |
| Oklahoma | Oklahoma City | | | 125B | Classen Boulevard | No Westbound entrance |
| Oklahoma | Oklahoma City | | | 126 | Western Avenue | Westbound exits onto NW Grand Blvd |
| Oklahoma | Oklahoma City | | | 127 | I-235 / US 77 south – Oklahoma City, Downtown US 77 north (Broadway Extension) – Edmond | Split into exits 127A (south) and 127B (north) eastbound; westbound entrance includes direct entrance ramp from N. 63rd Street |
| Oklahoma | Oklahoma City | | | 128A | Lincoln Boulevard – State Capitol | |
| Oklahoma | Oklahoma City | | | 128B | Kelley Avenue | |
| Oklahoma | Oklahoma City | | | 129 | M.L. King Avenue | |
| Oklahoma | Oklahoma City | 27.6 | 44.4 | 130 | I-35 west to I-40 – Oklahoma City, Dallas | Western end of I-35 concurrency; I-35 exit 133; no exit number westbound |
| Oklahoma | Oklahoma City | | | 134 | Wilshire Boulevard | Exit numbers follow I-35 |
| Oklahoma | Oklahoma City | | | 135 | Britton Road | |
| Oklahoma | Oklahoma City | | | 136 | Hefner Road | |
| Oklahoma | Oklahoma City | | | 137 | NE 122nd Street | |
| Oklahoma | Oklahoma City | 32.2 | 51.8 | 138A | I-44 Toll east (Turner Turnpike) – Tulsa | Eastern end of I-44 concurrency |
| Oklahoma | Oklahoma City | 32.2 | 51.8 | 138B | I-344 Toll west (Kilpatrick Turnpike) | |
| Oklahoma | Oklahoma City | | | 138C | Sooner Road | Westbound exit and eastbound entrance |
| Oklahoma | Edmond | | | 138D | Memorial Road | |
| Oklahoma | Edmond | | | 139 | SE 33rd Street | |
| Oklahoma | Edmond | | | 140 | SE 15th Street | |
| Oklahoma | Edmond | 35.8 | 57.6 | | I-35 / US 77 north – Wichita US 77 south (2nd Street west) – Edmond | Eastern end of I-35 concurrency; I-35 exit 141 |
| Lincoln | | 55.2– 55.5 | 88.8– 89.3 | | SH-102 south / SH-66B east | Northern terminus of SH-102; western terminus of SH-66B; SH-66B was pre-1933 US-66 east |
| Lincoln | Wellston | 57.5 | 92.5 | | SH-66B west – Wellston | Pre-1933 US-66 west |
| Lincoln | | 57.9 | 93.2 | | I-44 Toll / Turner Turnpike – Tulsa, Oklahoma City | I-44 exit 158 |
| Lincoln | Warwick | 59.5 | 95.8 | | US 177 – Ponca City, Carney, Shawnee | |
| Lincoln | Chandler | 67.3 | 108.3 | | SH-18 south – Shawnee, Meeker | western end of SH-18 concurrency |
| Lincoln | Chandler | 68.2 | 109.8 | | SH-18 north (Manvel Avenue) to I-44 Toll – Cushing | eastern end of SH-18 concurrency |
| Lincoln | Stroud | 81.8 | 131.6 | | US 377 / SH-99 (8th Avenue) to I-44 Toll | |
| Creek | Bristow | 99.3 | 159.8 | | SH-16 east / SH-48 south (Main Street) | Western end of SH-16 / SH-48 concurrency |
| Creek | Bristow | 100.0 | 160.9 | | SH-16 west – Shamrock | Eastern end of SH-16 concurrency |
| Creek | Bristow | 100.5 | 161.7 | | I-44 Toll / Turner Turnpike – Tulsa, Oklahoma City | I-44 exit 196 |
| Creek | | 103.1 | 165.9 | | SH-48 north to SH-33 | Eastern end of SH-48 concurrency |
| Creek | Kellyville | 108.9 | 175.3 | | I-44 Toll / Turner Turnpike – Tulsa, Oklahoma City | I-44 exit 203 |
| Creek | Sapulpa | 117.3 | 188.8 | | SH-33 west to I-44 Toll – Cushing | Western end of SH-33 concurrency |
| Creek | Sapulpa | 120.2 | 193.4 | | SH-117 east | Western terminus of SH-117 |
| Creek | Sapulpa | 121.8 | 196.0 | | SH-33 ends / US 75 Alt. south (S. Main Street) / SH-97 north (N. Main Street) | Eastern end of SH-33 concurrency; eastern terminus of SH-33; southern terminus of SH-97; northern terminus of US-75 Alt. |
| Creek | Sapulpa | 122.7 | 197.5 | | SH-117A south (Mission Street) | Northern terminus of SH-117A |
| Creek | Sapulpa | 124.9 | 201.0 | | SH-364 / Creek Turnpike east | Interchange |
| Tulsa | Sapulpa | 128.7 | 207.1 | | I-44 Toll west / Turner Turnpike | Western end of I-44 concurrency, eastern terminus of Turner Tpk.; I-44 exit 221 |
| Tulsa | Sapulpa | | | 222A | 49th West Avenue | Exit numbers follow I-44 |
| Tulsa | Sapulpa | | | 222B | 55th Place | Eastbound exit only |
| Tulsa | Sapulpa | | | 222C | 56th Street | Westbound exit only |
| Tulsa | Sapulpa | 129.9 | 209.1 | 223A | I-244 east / SH-344 north (Gilcrease Expressway) – Downtown Tulsa | Signed as exits 223A (east) and 223B (north) westbound; western terminus and exit 1A on I-244; southern terminus of SH-344 |
| Tulsa | Tulsa | | | 223C | 33rd West Avenue | |
| Tulsa | Tulsa | | | 224 | Union Avenue | C/D lanes provide access to US-75 and Elwood Ave. |
| Tulsa | Tulsa | 131.8 | 212.1 | 224 | US 75 – Okmulgee, Bartlesville | Cloverleaf interchange; accessible to and from C/D lanes |
| Tulsa | Tulsa | | | 225 | Elwood Avenue | Eastbound access is part of exit 224 accessible from C/D lanes originating at Union Ave. exit |
| Tulsa | Tulsa | | | 226A | Riverside Drive | |
| Tulsa | Tulsa | | | 226B | Peoria Avenue | |
| Tulsa | Tulsa | | | 227 | Lewis Avenue | |
| Tulsa | Tulsa | | | 228 | 51st Street / Harvard Avenue | |
| Tulsa | Tulsa | | | 229 | Yale Avenue | |
| Tulsa | Tulsa | | | 230 | 41st Street / Sheridan Road | |
| Tulsa | Tulsa | 138.5 | 222.9 | 231 | US 64 / SH-51 to US 169 – Muskogee, Broken Arrow, Downtown Tulsa | |
| Tulsa | Tulsa | | | 232 | E. 31st Street / Memorial Drive | Eastbound exit is part of exit 231 |
| Tulsa | Tulsa | | | 233 | E. 21st Street | Signed as exit 233B westbound |
| Tulsa | Tulsa | 141.2 | 227.2 | 234A | US 169 – Owasso, Broken Arrow | No eastbound exit to US-169 south |
| Tulsa | Tulsa | | | 234B | Garnett Road | Eastbound exit and westbound entrance |
| Tulsa | Tulsa | | | 235 | E. 11th Street | |
| Tulsa | Tulsa | | | 236 | 129th East Avenue | |
| Tulsa | Tulsa | 144.0 | 231.7 | 236B | I-244 / US 412 west (Crosstown Expressway) – Sand Springs, Enid | Westbound exit and eastbound entrance; western end of US-412 concurrency; eastern terminus of I-244 |
| Tulsa–Rogers county line | Tulsa–Catoosa line | | | 238 | 161st East Avenue | |
| Tulsa–Rogers county line | Tulsa–Catoosa line | | | 240 | SH-167 north (193rd East Avenue) | No eastbound entrance |
| Tulsa–Rogers county line | Catoosa | 147.7 | 237.7 | — | I-44 / US 412 east – Claremore, Joplin, Chouteau, Siloam Springs | East end of freeway section; no westbound access to I-44/US-412 east; eastern end of I-44/US-412 concurrency; former SH-33 east; I-44 east exit 241 |
| Rogers | Catoosa | | | — | I-44 Toll / Will Rogers Turnpike east – Claremore, Joplin | Former tolled interchange; closed upon I-44/Will Rogers Tpk. realignment; had no eastbound exit; former Will Rogers Tpk. exit 241 |
| Rogers | Verdigris | 155.4 | 250.1 | | SH-266 to I-44 Toll (Turnpike) – Port of Catoosa | Interchange |
| Rogers | Claremore | 160.9 | 258.9 | | SH-88 south (First Street) | western end of SH-88 concurrency |
| Rogers | Claremore | 161.0 | 259.1 | | SH-20 east (Patti Page Boulevard) | western end of SH-20 concurrency |
| Rogers | Claremore | 161.0 | 259.1 | | SH-20 west / SH-88 north (Will Rogers Boulevard) | eastern end of SH-20 / SH-88 concurrency |
| Rogers | Foyil | 171.4 | 275.8 | | SH-28A east – Adair | Western terminus of SH-28A |
| Rogers | Chelsea | 179.0 | 288.1 | | SH-28 east – Adair | Western end of SH-28 concurrency |
| Rogers | Chelsea | 179.6 | 289.0 | | SH-28 west (6th Street) – Alluwe | Eastern end of SH-28 concurrency |
| Craig | | 192.7 | 310.1 | | US 60 east | Eastern terminus; no direct access to US-60 west; road continues as US-60 east (former US 66 east) |
1.000 mi = 1.609 km; 1.000 km = 0.621 mi: Closed/former; Concurrency terminus; Incomplete access; Tolled

== See also ==
- U.S. Route 66
- U.S. Route 66 in Oklahoma
- K-66
