= Oklahoma State Highway 20 =

Highway in Oklahoma

State Highway 20

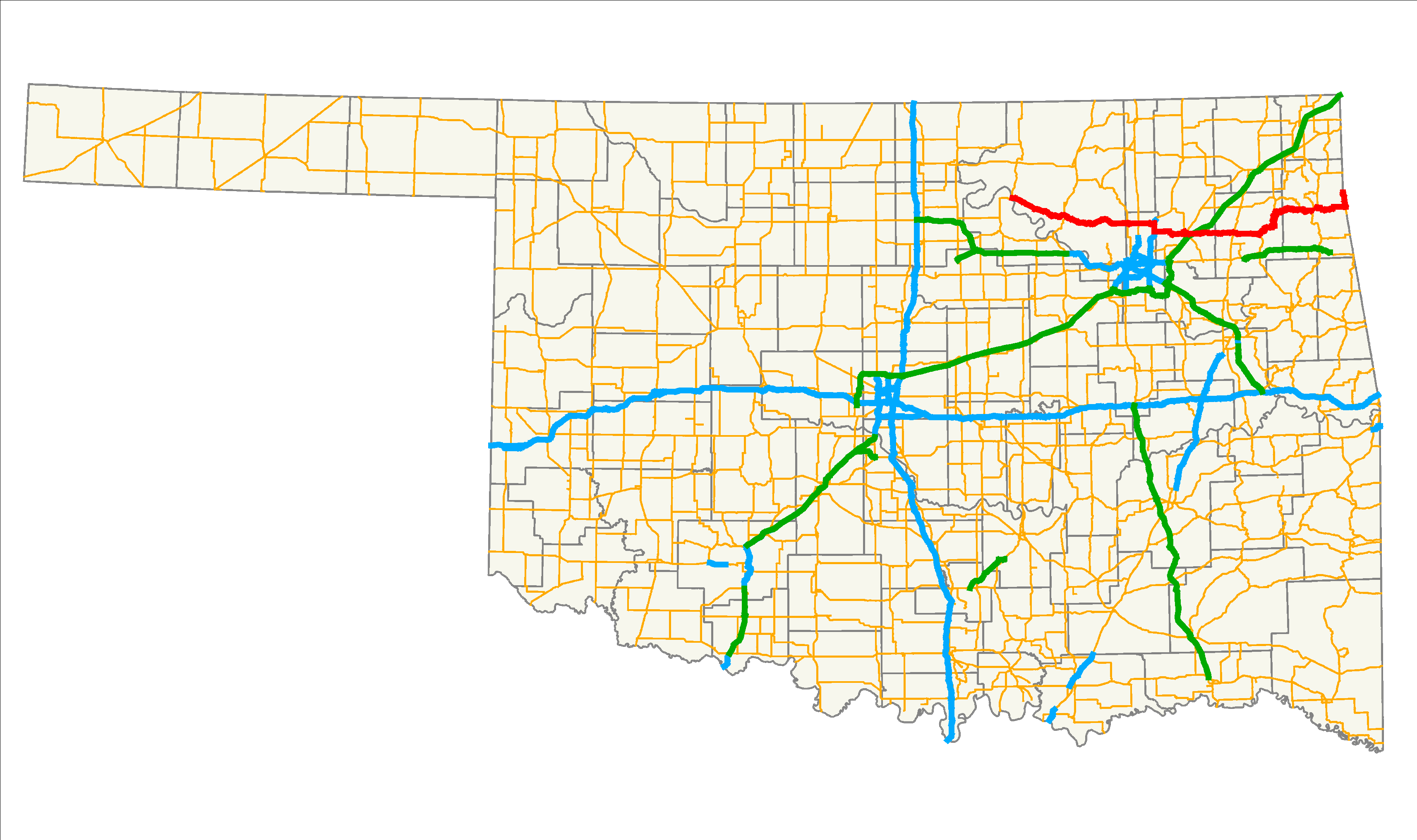

Route information
- Maintained by ODOT
- Length: 142.7 mi (229.7 km)

Major junctions
- West end: SH-18 near Ralston
- SH-99 in Hominy; US 75 in Collinsville; I-44 / Will Rogers Turnpike in Claremore; US 69 in Pryor; US 59 / SH-10 in Jay; AR 43 at the Arkansas state line near Maysville, AR; then runs concurrently north along the state line
- East end: AR 43 / Route 43 at the Arkansas–Missouri state tripoint near Southwest City, MO

Location
- Country: United States
- State: Oklahoma
- Counties: Osage, Tulsa, Rogers, Mayes, Delaware, Benton (AR)

Highway system
- Oklahoma State Highway System; Interstate; US; State; Turnpikes
← SH-19	→ SH-22

State Highway 20 (abbreviated SH-20) is a highway in northeastern Oklahoma. Its eastern terminus is at the Missouri state line; its western terminus is at SH-18 near Ralston. The highway runs a total length of 142.7 miles (229.7 km). It has no lettered spur routes.

== Route description ==
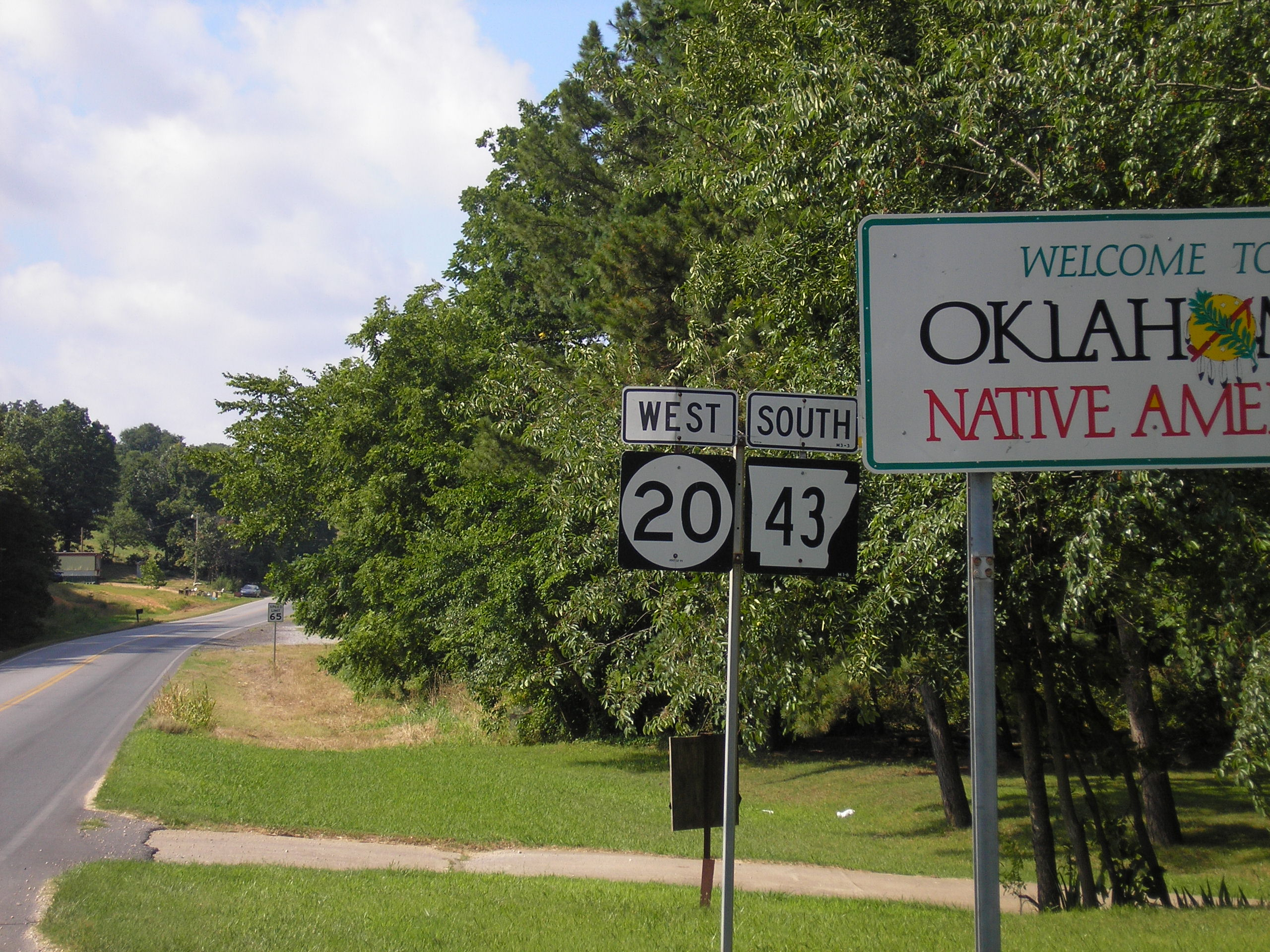
Eastern terminus of State Highway 20 at Missouri Route 43

SH-20 begins just north of the Arkansas River at SH-18 near Ralston. From there, it heads east through Osage County for 20 miles (32 km) without crossing any other highway. At mile 20.4, it meets State Highway 99 in Hominy. East of Hominy, SH-20 crosses Lake Skiatook before passing through Skiatook and entering Tulsa County. Shortly after entering Tulsa County, SH-20 has a junction with SH-11. Four miles later, it has an interchange with US-75. After running through Collinsville, it turns southward onto the US-169 freeway.

SH-20 splits from US-169 north of Owasso. It then enters Claremore, where it meets SH-88 and SH-66 (old Route 66). It connects to the Claremore toll plaza on I-44/Will Rogers Turnpike. East of Claremore, SH-20 becomes a divided expressway before intersecting US-69 in Pryor. West of Salina, the highway bridges Lake Hudson. In Salina, SH-20 meets SH-82, with which it begins a concurrency.

Headed north from Salina, the two highways begin to cross some mountainous terrain. The highways provide access to Spavinaw State Park, before running through the town of Spavinaw, Oklahoma. North of Spavinaw, SH-20 splits off to the east, running through unincorporated Chloeta and serving as the eastern terminus of SH-28. SH-20 overlaps US-59/State Highway 10 through Jay. SH-20 then splits off to the east, running 11 miles (18 km) to the Arkansas line.

The easternmost miles run north/south along the Oklahoma–Arkansas state line, and along this stretch the highway overlaps Arkansas's Highway 43. The highway continues northward into Missouri at the point where the Oklahoma, Arkansas and Missouri borders meet, and thereafter becomes Missouri Route 43.

== History ==
On April 10, 2008, a section of SH-20 in Rogers County near Keetonville, west of Claremore, was closed due to a landside caused by heavy rains. A 500-foot (150 m) section of roadbed was washed away, forming a large crack in the pavement and damaging the guardrail. The highway was re-opened June 5, 2008 after being repaired.

On April 18, 2025, a new section of SH-20 opened, bypassing Claremore to south and connecting to a new interchange at Interstate 44.

== Major junctions ==
All exits are unnumbered.

County	Location	mi	km	Destinations	Notes
Osage		0.00	0.00	SH-18 – Ralston, Fairfax	Western terminus
Osage	Hominy	20.3	32.7	SH-99	
Tulsa	Skiatook	44.2	71.1	SH-11	
Tulsa	Collinsville	48.2	77.6	US 75 – Tulsa, Bartlesville	Diamond interchange
Tulsa	Collinsville	53.7	86.4	Western end of freeway section	
Tulsa	Collinsville	53.7	86.4	US 169 north – Nowata	Western end of US-169 concurrency
Tulsa		54.9	88.4	E. 136th Street N.	Parclo interchange
Tulsa		55.7	89.6	E. 126th Street N.	Diamond interchange
Tulsa	Owasso	56.7	91.2	US 169 south	Eastern end of US-169 concurrency
Tulsa	Owasso	56.7	91.2	Eastern end of freeway section	
Rogers	Claremore	69.2	111.4	SH-66 west (Lynn Riggs Boulevard); former US 66 east	Western end of SH-66 concurrency
Rogers	Claremore	71.8	115.6	SH-88 south (First Street)	Southern end of SH-88 concurrency
Rogers	Claremore	71.9	115.7	SH-66 east / SH-88 north (Lynn Riggs Boulevard north)	Northern end of SH-66/SH-88 concurrency; former US 66 east
Rogers	Claremore	73.3	118.0	I-44 Toll / Will Rogers Turnpike – Joplin, Tulsa	Exit 255 on I-44 / Turnpike
Mayes	Pryor	88.7	142.7	US 69 (Mill Street)	
Mayes	Salina	98.4	158.4	SH-82 south	Western end of SH-82 concurrency
Mayes	Spavinaw	112.9	181.7	SH-82 north	Eastern end of SH-82 concurrency
Delaware		121.9	196.2	SH-28	Eastern terminus of SH-28
Delaware	Jay	126.4	203.4	US 59 south / SH-10 south – Upper Spavinaw Recreation Area, Kansas	Western end of US-59/SH-10 concurrency
Delaware	Jay	128.1	206.2	SH-127	Southern terminus of SH-127
Delaware	Jay	128.6	207.0	US 59 north / SH-10 north – Grove	Eastern end of US-59/SH-10 concurrency
Delaware–Benton county line		139.6	224.7	AR 43 south – Maysville Ark.	Western end of AR 43 concurrency
Delaware–McDonald– Benton county tripoint	OKARMO Corner	145.1	233.5	Route 43 north – Southwest City	Continuation into Missouri; eastern terminus of SH-20 and AR 43
1.000 mi = 1.609 km; 1.000 km = 0.621 mi: Concurrency terminus; Tolled
