= Will Rogers Turnpike =

Highway in Oklahoma

Will Rogers Turnpike
- Will Rogers Turnpike highlighted in red

Route information
- Maintained by Oklahoma Turnpike Authority
- Length: 88.5 mi (142.4 km)
- Existed: June 28, 1957–present
- Component highways: I-44 entire length

Major junctions
- West end: I-44 / US 412 / Creek Turnpike in Fair Oaks
- US 69 in Big Cabin; US 59 / US 60 near Afton
- East end: I-44 at the Missouri state line in Joplin

Location
- Country: United States
- State: Oklahoma
- Counties: Rogers, Mayes, Craig, Ottawa

Highway system
- Oklahoma State Highway System; Interstate; US; State; Turnpikes

The Will Rogers Turnpike is a controlled-access toll road in the northeast portion of the U.S. state of Oklahoma. The highway begins as a continuation of the Creek Turnpike in Tulsa, continuing northward from the I-44/US-412 interchange there to the Missouri state line in Joplin. The turnpike carries the I-44 designation for its entire length. The turnpike is 88.5 miles (142.4 km) long and costs $4.75 (for a two-axle vehicle) to drive one way. The Will Rogers Turnpike opened to traffic on June 28, 1957. It was designated as I-44 in 1958. It is named for Will Rogers, "Oklahoma's Favorite Son".

== Route description ==
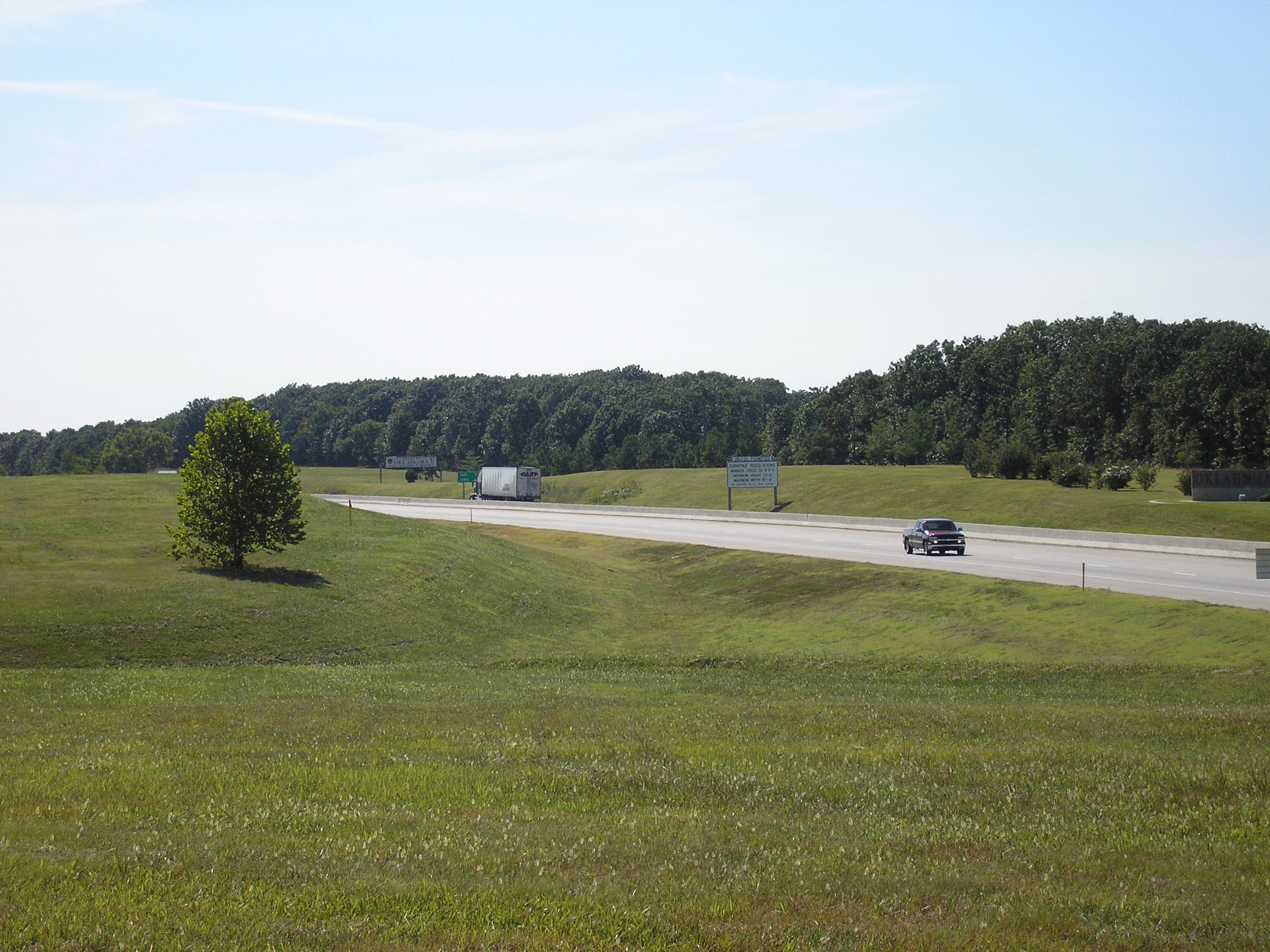
Eastern terminus of the Will Rogers Turnpike at the Oklahoma–Missouri state line

The Will Rogers Turnpike begins at an interchange between I-44, US-412, and the Creek Turnpike on the northeast side of Tulsa, straddling the line between Wagoner County and Rogers County. The Creek Turnpike ends at this interchange, with northbound Creek Turnpike traffic continuing onto the Will Rogers Turnpike. I-44 eastbound traffic also merges into the turnpike here. The turnpike heads north to its first interchange, which provides an exit to East Pine Street for westbound traffic and an entrance to the eastbound turnpike. North of the Pine Street interchange, the highway curves to a more northeast course, crossing the Verdigris River. In Verdigris, the turnpike has an interchange at the eastern terminus of SH-266. The turnpike continues northeast to Claremore, county seat of Rogers County, where it junctions SH-20; it also passes over SH-88 in Claremore, with no access provided between the two highways. The turnpike then continues northeast out of Rogers County.

After leaving Rogers County, the Will Rogers Turnpike enters Mayes County. The only interchange in Mayes County is a partial interchange with SH-28 west of Adair. Eastbound motorists can exit the turnpike at SH-28 and motorists on SH-28 can join the turnpike heading westbound. From this interchange, SH-28 continues northeast, entering Craig County.

North of Big Cabin, the Will Rogers Turnpike comes to a junction with US-69. Just northeast of this interchange is the only mainline barrier toll plaza on the turnpike. After the toll plaza, the highway passes under the McDonald's restaurant at the Vinita service plaza (see below). On the east side of Vinita, the road comes to an interchange with US-60 and US-69. From Vinita, the turnpike continues northeast out of Craig County.

The final county that the Will Rogers Turnpike serves is Ottawa County. The first interchange in Ottawa County lies northeast of Afton; here, motorists can access US-59, US-60, and US-69. The turnpike continues to its final interchange, near the county seat, Miami. This interchange serves SH-10. Just north of this interchange is a welcome center for westbound traffic. The highway continues northeast to the state line. I-44 continues east into Newton County, Missouri toward Joplin and Springfield.

== History ==
Because the Will Rogers Turnpike was built prior to authorization of the Interstate Highway System (in 1956), it uses a different set of design standards than today's. As the road has been rebuilt, this is being brought in line with current design practice.

The original route of the Turnpike continued straight into and through Tulsa, becoming Skelly Drive in town (where tolls are not charged). The westernmost portion of the Will Rogers Turnpike was modified so that the Creek and Will Rogers Turnpikes form one road, with motorists required to exit at an interchange to stay on I-44. The original interchange was changed due to numerous difficulties for semis trying to merge into the single lane going to I-44 and Route 66. The new interchange was incorporated into an upgrade of US 412, with provisions for future expansion of the turnpike over a decade later, creating the Creek Turnpike bypass around the Metropolitan area, connecting back to the Turner Turnpike. The remaining pavement of the old alignment is now used as a training ground for the Oklahoma Highway Patrol, among others.

== Tolls ==
The Will Rogers Turnpike has used all-electronic tolling since November 20, 2024. Cash is no longer accepted. Tolls are paid using PikePass, the Oklahoma Turnpike Authority's transponder-based electronic toll collection system, or PlatePay, which uses automatic license plate recognition to bill a vehicle's registered owner. As of 2025, a two-axle vehicle currently pays $5.40 with PikePass or $10.50 with PlatePay to drive the full length of the Turnpike, with higher rates charged for larger vehicles such as tractor-trailers. PikePass tolls are calculated based on the vehicle's entry and exit locations, which are determined by transponder readers placed at each interchange and at the two termini. PlatePay tolls are collected at the main toll plaza located southwest of Vinita. Reduced PlatePay tolls are also collected at some interchange ramps for shorter trips would not otherwise pass through the main toll plaza, although all PlatePay users that pass through the main toll plaza are charged the full toll regardless of entry or exit location. The Will Rogers Turnpike was the last turnpike on the Oklahoma Turnpike system to switch to all-electronic tolling.

Upon opening, the Will Rogers Turnpike (as well as the Turner Turnpike on the other side of Tulsa) used a closed ticket-based collection system. Motorists entering the turnpike were issued an entry ticket that indicated the location of entry, which was then presented to the toll collector upon exit to determine the toll amount. In 1991, both turnpikes switched to a somewhat unusual tolling system for cash-paying vehicles. A new mainline toll plaza was built southwest of Vinita (halfway between Joplin and Tulsa) replacing the two mainline toll plazas at the turnpike's two termini. Cash-paying motorists paid the full toll at this plaza and were issued a receipt. If one exited before reaching this plaza or entered at an interchange after the plaza, the toll for the portion travelled was collected at the interchange. If one's desired exit was located after the plaza, the motorist paid the full toll at the barrier plaza, then presented their receipt at the ramp for a refund of the untraveled portion. Entry tickets were also no longer issued except for those entering at an interchange before the main toll plaza. The Vinita mainline toll plaza also included open road tolling lanes for the then-newly introduced PikePass system, which are now used by all traffic following the all-electronic tolling conversion.

== Services ==
Law enforcement along the Will Rogers Turnpike is provided by Oklahoma Highway Patrol Troop XA, a special troop assigned to the turnpike.

=== Vinita service plaza ===
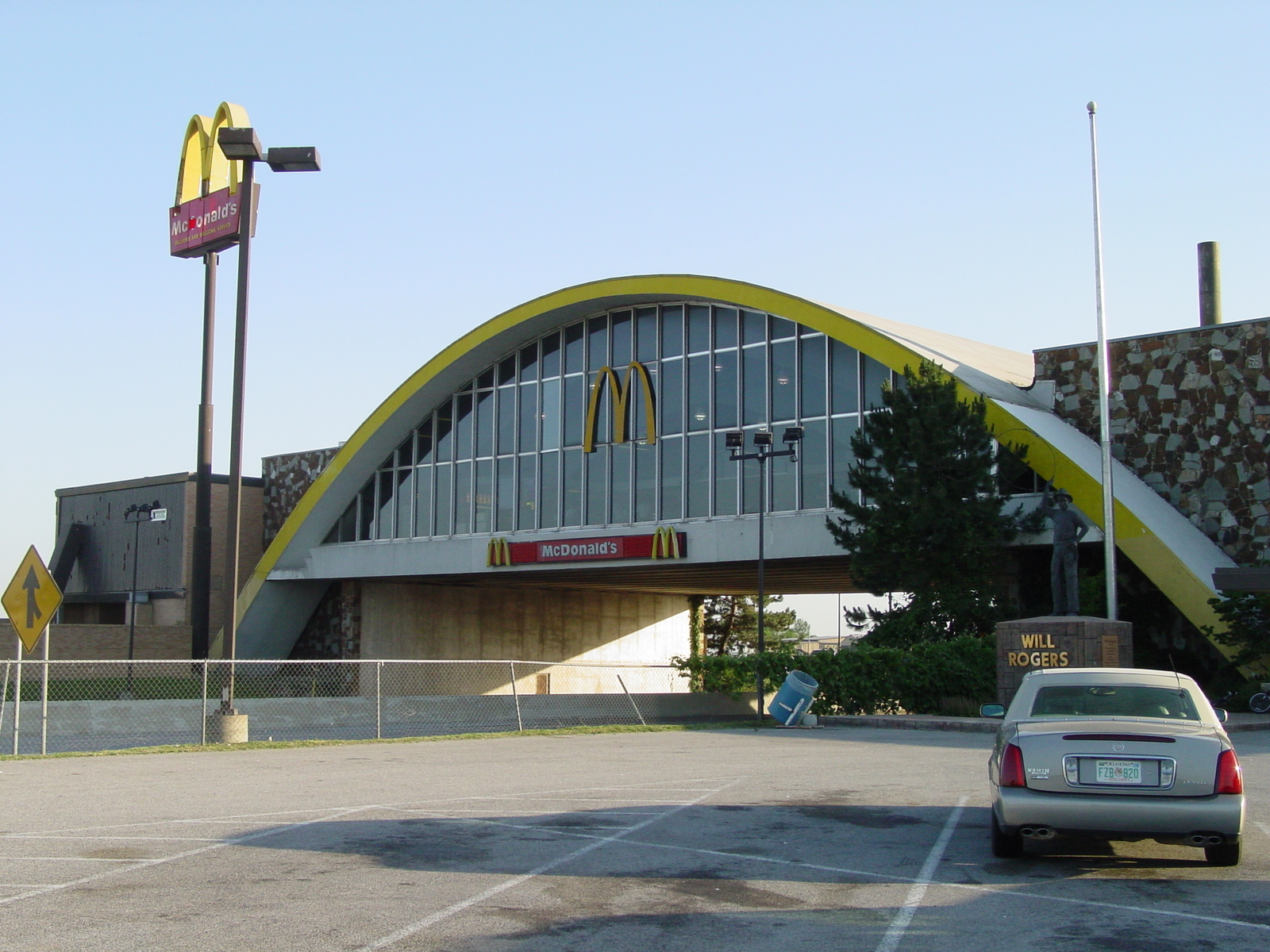
A view of the Vinita McDonald's from the westbound parking lot

The Will Rogers Turnpike's most prominent service plaza lies between the toll plaza and the Vinita exit. The main feature of this service plaza is a 29,135-square-foot (2,706.7 m^{2}) McDonald's bridge restaurants spanning the turnpike. Customers can view the traffic passing beneath the restaurant from the dining area through windows overlooking the highway. At the front of the west anchor stands a statue of Will Rogers. A Phillips 66 gas station is also available for both directions of travel at the plaza.

The architecture of the McDonald's building is dominated by golden arches on both sides of the building that appear from a distance to be not only the corporate symbol of the chain but the primary supports for a steel arch bridge structure over the turnpike. Visitors to the eatery exit from either side of the interstate, and then enter through one of the sides, and then proceed to the restaurant level via stairs or an elevator.

The building hosting the McDonald's restaurant was originally built when the turnpike opened in 1957 as one of the Glass House restaurants, owned by the now-defunct Interstate Hosts company. Because of this heritage, it is also known as the "Glass House McDonald's" and the "McDonald's Glass House Restaurant". The building originally operated as a Howard Johnson's restaurant.

The McDonald's is purported to be the "world's largest." However, the biggest temporary McDonald's in the world was opened during the 2012 Summer Olympics in London, which had 3,000-square-metre (32,000 sq ft) but it was demolished after the 2012 Summer Olympics.

The building and service plaza closed on June 4, 2013, for a complete renovation. It reopened on December 22, 2014 with a McDonald's, Subway, and Kum & Go fuel stations. It reopened as the Will Rogers Archway. The Kum & Go fuel stations were re-branded to Maverik in August 2024 following Kum & Go's acquisition by Maverik's parent company.

== Exit list ==
| County | Location | mi | km | Exit | Destinations | Notes |
|---|---|---|---|---|---|---|
| Rogers | Fair Oaks | 0.00 | 0.00 | | Creek Turnpike west – Oklahoma City | Continuation west |
| Rogers | Fair Oaks | 0.00 | 0.00 | 33 | I-44 west / US 412 to SH-66 – Tulsa, Chouteau, Siloam Springs | Western end of I-44 concurrency; signed as exits 33A (east) and 33B (west) eastbound, exits 33A (east) and 34 (west) westbound |
| Rogers | Catoosa | | | 241 | SH-66 east – Catoosa | East Tulsa Interchange; closed; was westbound exit only on old alignment |
| Rogers | | 1.3 | 2.1 | 35 | East Pine Street | Westbound exit and eastbound entrance; exit no. corresponds to Creek Turnpike; future full interchange |
| Rogers | Verdigris | 5.6 | 9.0 | 248 | SH-266 west – Port of Catoosa, Claremore | Eastern terminus of SH-266 |
| Rogers | Claremore | 9 | 14 | 252 | SH-20 – Claremore (Flint Road) | Interchange opened on March 13, 2025 |
| Rogers | Claremore | 12.8 | 20.6 | 255 | SH-20 – Pryor, Claremore | |
| Mayes | | 28.3 | 45.5 | 269 | SH-28 – Adair, Chelsea, South Grand Lake | Eastbound exit and westbound entrance; future full interchange |
| Craig | Big Cabin | 41.2 | 66.3 | 283 | US 69 – Big Cabin | |
| Craig | | 44.3 | 71.3 | Toll gantry | | |
| Craig | Vinita | 46.8 | 75.3 | Service plaza | | |
| Craig | | 47.8 | 76.9 | 289 | US 60 (US-69) to SH-66 – Vinita | |
| Ottawa | | 60.5 | 97.4 | 302 | US 59 / US 60 (US-69) – Fairland, Grove, Afton | |
| Ottawa | Miami | 71.7 | 115.4 | 313 | SH-10 – Miami | |
| Newton | Joplin | 87.9 | 141.5 | | I-44 east | Continuation into Missouri; eastern end of I-44 concurrency |
1.000 mi = 1.609 km; 1.000 km = 0.621 mi: Closed/former; Concurrency terminus; Electronic toll collection; Incomplete access

== See also ==
- Will Rogers
- Pikepass
- Oklahoma Turnpike Authority
