= Jamestown, Oklahoma =

- Unincorporated community
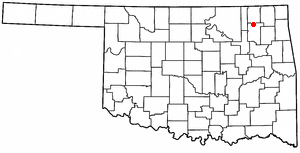
- Location of Jamestown, Oklahoma
- Coordinates: 36°34′12″N 95°37′46″W
- Country: United States
- State: Oklahoma
- County: Rogers

Area
  - Total: 0.15 sq mi (0.4 km^{2})
  - Land: 0.15 sq mi (0.4 km^{2})
  - Water: 0 sq mi (0.0 km^{2})
- Elevation: 696 ft (212 m)

Population (2000)
  - Total: 10
  - Density: 68/sq mi (26.4/km^{2})
- Time zone: UTC-6 (Central (CST))
  - Summer (DST): UTC-5 (CDT)
- FIPS code: 40-37550
- GNIS feature ID: 1102941

Jamestown is an unincorporated community in Rogers County, Oklahoma, United States. The population was 10 at the 2000 census, at which time it was a town; the community disincorporated in 1998, but the change was not reported to the Census Bureau until 2006.

== Geography ==
Jamestown is located at 36°34′12″N 95°37′46″W (36.570063, -95.629318).

According to the United States Census Bureau, the town had a total area of 0.2 square miles (0.52 km^{2}), all land.

== Demographics ==
As of the census of 2000, there were 10 people, 4 households, and 3 families residing in the town. The population density was 68.5 inhabitants per square mile (26.4/km^{2}). There were 4 housing units at an average density of 27.4 per square mile (10.6/km^{2}). The racial makeup of the town was 60.00% White, and 40.00% from two or more races.

There were 4 households, out of which 25.0% had children under the age of 18 living with them, 75.0% were married couples living together, and 25.0% were non-families. 25.0% of all households were made up of individuals, and 25.0% had someone living alone who was 65 years of age or older. The average household size was 2.50 and the average family size was 3.00.

In the town the population was spread out, with 20.0% under the age of 18, 10.0% from 18 to 24, 20.0% from 25 to 44, 40.0% from 45 to 64, and 10.0% who were 65 years of age or older. The median age was 52 years. For every 100 females, there were 150.0 males. For every 100 females age 18 and over, there were 166.7 males.

The median income for a household in the town was $54,583, and the median income for a family was $54,583. Males had a median income of $0 versus $0 for females. The per capita income for the town was $33,007. None of the population and none of the families were below the poverty line.
