= Oklahoma State Highway 28 =

State highway in Oklahoma, United States

State Highway 28

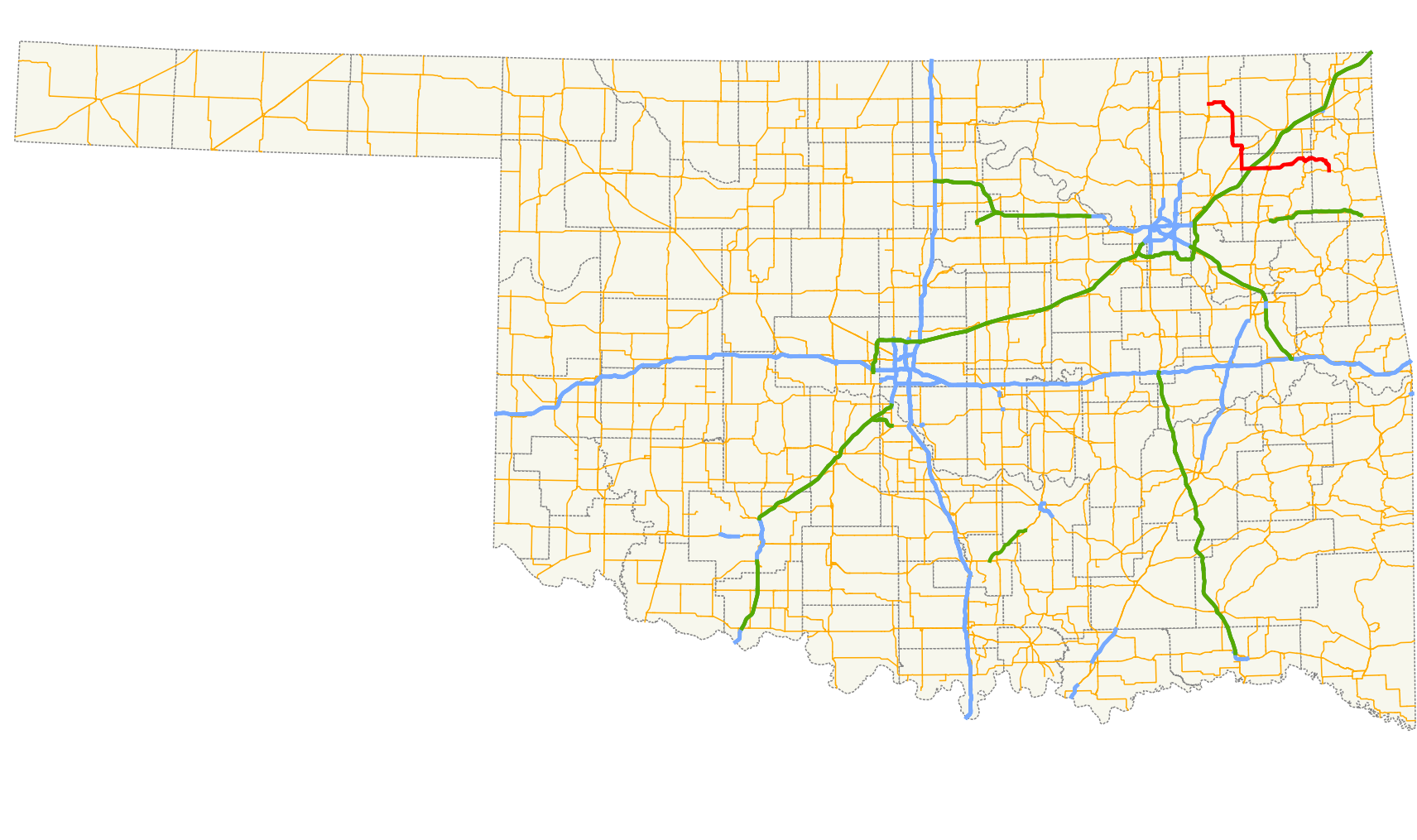

Route information
- Maintained by ODOT
- Length: 68.4 mi (110.1 km)

Major junctions
- West end: US 169 south of Delaware
- US 60 near Nowata; I-44 / Will Rogers Turnpike near Foyil; US 69 in Adair
- East end: SH-20 west of Jay

Location
- Country: United States
- State: Oklahoma

Highway system
- Oklahoma State Highway System; Interstate; US; State; Turnpikes
← SH-27	→ SH-29

State Highway 28 (abbreviated SH-28) is a state highway in Oklahoma. It runs 68.4 miles (110.1 km) in an irregular west-to-east pattern through Nowata, Rogers, Mayes and Delaware counties.

There is one letter-suffixed spur highway branching from SH-28, SH-28A.

== Route description ==
SH-28 begins at US-169 just south of Delaware. From there it travels 12 miles (19 km) east-to-south, passing the community of Childers, to a junction with US-60.

Crossing US-60, SH-28 runs six miles (9.7 km) due south to New Alluwe, then eight miles (13 km) south and east to Chelsea, where it intersects SH-66.

From Chelsea, it is six miles (9.7 km) straight south to the junction with SH-28A, where SH-28 turns due east, intersects with I-44 after four miles (6.4 km), and five miles (8.0 km) farther crosses US-69 at Adair.

Upon leaving Adair, SH-28 runs mainly east, eight miles (13 km) to Pensacola, then follows the arc of the Neosho River to the SH-82 junction outside of Langley. SH-28 crosses SH-82, then passes through Langley before crossing the Neosho River over Pensacola Dam into the town of Disney.

SH-28 then travels east to south 12 miles (19 km) to its terminus at SH-20, five miles (8.0 km) west of Jay.

== SH-28A ==

SH-28A is SH-28's only spur, lying entirely in Rogers County. It runs 4.56 miles (7.34 km) west-to-east connecting SH-66 in Foyil with SH-28.

== Junction list ==
County	Location	mi	km	Destinations	Notes
Nowata	Delaware	0.0	0.0	US 169	Western terminus
Nowata		11.4	18.3	US 60	
Rogers	Chelsea	25.9	41.7	SH-66	Northern end of SH-66 concurrency
Rogers	Chelsea	26.5	42.6	SH-66	Southern end of SH-66 concurrency
Rogers		32.6	52.5	SH-28A	Eastern terminus of SH-28A
Mayes		35.6	57.3	I-44 Toll / Will Rogers Turnpike	Access to westbound I-44 and from eastbound I-44 only
Mayes	Adair	41.7	67.1	US 69	
Mayes	Langley	54.6	87.9	SH-82	Northern end of SH-82 concurrency
Mayes	Langley	55.4	89.2	SH-82	Southern end of SH-82 concurrency
Delaware		68.4	110.1	SH-20	Eastern terminus
1.000 mi = 1.609 km; 1.000 km = 0.621 mi: Concurrency terminus; Incomplete access
