= Gregory, Oklahoma =

- CDP
- Location within the state of Oklahoma
- Coordinates: 36°10′11″N 95°34′27″W
- Country: United States
- State: Oklahoma
- County: Rogers

Area
  - Total: 3.01 sq mi (7.79 km^{2})
  - Land: 3.01 sq mi (7.79 km^{2})
  - Water: 0 sq mi (0.00 km^{2})
- Elevation: 633 ft (193 m)

Population (2020)
  - Total: 377
  - Density: 125.4/sq mi (48.42/km^{2})
- Time zone: UTC-6 (Central (CST))
  - Summer (DST): UTC-5 (CDT)
- FIPS code: 40-31425
- GNIS feature ID: 2631113

Gregory is a census-designated place (CDP) in Rogers County, Oklahoma, United States. As of the 2020 census, Gregory had a population of 377.

== Geography ==
The community is on US Route 412 approximately miles east of the Verdigris River and 3.5 miles northwest of Inola.

According to the United States Census Bureau, the CDP has a total area of 3.0 square miles (7.8 km^{2}), all land.

== Demographics ==
Historical population
Census	Pop.	Note	%±
2020	377		—
U.S. Decennial Census

=== 2020 census ===
As of the 2020 census, Gregory had a population of 377. The median age was 40.3 years. 32.1% of residents were under the age of 18 and 16.7% of residents were 65 years of age or older. For every 100 females there were 113.0 males, and for every 100 females age 18 and over there were 95.4 males age 18 and over.

0.0% of residents lived in urban areas, while 100.0% lived in rural areas.

There were 122 households in Gregory, of which 32.0% had children under the age of 18 living in them. Of all households, 71.3% were married-couple households, 13.1% were households with a male householder and no spouse or partner present, and 6.6% were households with a female householder and no spouse or partner present. About 11.5% of all households were made up of individuals and 3.3% had someone living alone who was 65 years of age or older.

There were 132 housing units, of which 7.6% were vacant. The homeowner vacancy rate was 1.0% and the rental vacancy rate was 0.0%.

Racial composition as of the 2020 census
Race	Number	Percent
White	275	72.9%
Black or African American	4	1.1%
American Indian and Alaska Native	29	7.7%
Asian	23	6.1%
Native Hawaiian and Other Pacific Islander	0	0.0%
Some other race	5	1.3%
Two or more races	41	10.9%
Hispanic or Latino (of any race)	12	3.2%

=== 2000 census ===
As of the census of 2000, there were 150 people, 54 households, and 46 families residing in the CDP. The population density was 49.8 inhabitants per square mile (19.2/km^{2}). There were 55 housing units at an average density of 18.2/sq mi (7.1/km^{2}). The racial makeup of the CDP was 83.33% White, 10.00% Native American, 0.67% Asian, and 6.00% from two or more races. Hispanic or Latino of any race were 1.33% of the population.

There were 54 households, out of which 38.9% had children under the age of 18 living with them, 68.5% were married couples living together, 13.0% had a female householder with no husband present, and 13.0% were non-families. 9.3% of all households were made up of individuals, and 1.9% had someone living alone who was 65 years of age or older. The average household size was 2.78 and the average family size was 2.96.

In the CDP, the population was spread out, with 28.0% under the age of 18, 3.3% from 18 to 24, 32.0% from 25 to 44, 25.3% from 45 to 64, and 11.3% who were 65 years of age or older. The median age was 38 years. For every 100 females, there were 94.8 males. For every 100 females age 18 and over, there were 92.9 males.

The median income for a household in the CDP was $70,865, and the median income for a family was $71,154. Males had a median income of $36,731 versus $31,875 for females. The per capita income for the CDP was $22,116. There were none of the families and 2.0% of the population living below the poverty line, including no under eighteens and none of those over 64.
