= Oklahoma State Highway 167 =

State highway in Oklahoma, United States

State Highway 167

Route information
- Maintained by ODOT
- Length: 4.88 mi (7.85 km)

Major junctions
- South end: I-44 / US 412 / SH-66 in Catoosa
- North end: SH-266 west of the Tulsa Port of Catoosa

Location
- Country: United States
- State: Oklahoma

Highway system
- Oklahoma State Highway System; Interstate; US; State; Turnpikes
← SH-166	→ US 169

State Highway 167 (abbreviated SH-167) is a state highway near Tulsa, Oklahoma. Having only a length of 4.88 miles (7.85 km), it only passes through Rogers Co. SH-167 connects Interstate 44/US 412/SH-66 at Catoosa to the Tulsa Port of Catoosa on the McClellan-Kerr Navigation System (part of the Arkansas River), and to serve truck traffic traveling to the port.

SH-167 has no lettered spur routes.

== Route description ==
SH-167 begins in the south at Exit 240A of I-44/US-412/SH-66 in the city of Catoosa. From there, SH-167 heads north on 193rd East Ave. About one and a half miles (2.4 km) north of I-44, the highway crosses a railroad, then continues north to cross Bird Creek. The route ends at SH-266 just west of the Port of Catoosa.

== Junction list ==
The entire route is in Rogers County.

Location	mi	km	Destinations	Notes
Catoosa	0.00	0.00	I-44 / US 412 / SH-66	I-44 exit 240; southern terminus.
	4.88	7.85	SH-266	Northern terminus.
1.000 mi = 1.609 km; 1.000 km = 0.621 mi
