= Oklahoma State Highway 266 =

State highway in Oklahoma, United States

State Highway 266

Route information
- Maintained by ODOT
- Length: 10.92 mi (17.57 km)

Major junctions
- West end: US 169 in Tulsa
- East end: I-44 / Will Rogers Turnpike in Verdigris

Location
- Country: United States
- State: Oklahoma

Highway system
- Oklahoma State Highway System; Interstate; US; State; Turnpikes
← US 266	→ US 270

State Highway 266 (abbreviated SH-266) is a state highway near Tulsa, Oklahoma, United States. It runs for 10.92 miles (17.57 km) through Tulsa and Rogers Counties in northeastern Oklahoma.

== Route description ==
SH-266 begins at a cloverleaf interchange with U.S. Highway 169 (a Tulsa-area freeway), and heads northeast from there to meet the northern terminus of State Highway 167 near the Port of Catoosa (north of the town of Catoosa). Highway 266 arcs to the north to bypass the port, and then straightens out to run due east to Interstate 44 (the Will Rogers Turnpike).

The number 266 refers to U.S. Highway 66 (now State Highway 66, which SH-266 ended at. Highway 266 does not have any lettered spur routes.

== Junction list ==
County	Location	mi	km	Destinations	Notes
Tulsa	Tulsa	0.0	0.0	US 169 (Mingo Valley Expressway) – Owasso, Collinsville	Western terminus; diamond interchange; road continues west as 46th Street North
Rogers		5.3	8.5	SH-167 south	Northern terminus of SH-167
Rogers	Verdigris	11.0	17.7	SH-66 – Claremore, Catoosa	Parclo interchange
Rogers	Verdigris	11.6	18.7	I-44 Toll / Will Rogers Turnpike – Joplin, Tulsa	Eastern terminus; I-44 exit 248
1.000 mi = 1.609 km; 1.000 km = 0.621 mi
