= Ed Galloway's Totem Pole Park =

- U.S. National Register of Historic Places
- U.S. Historic district
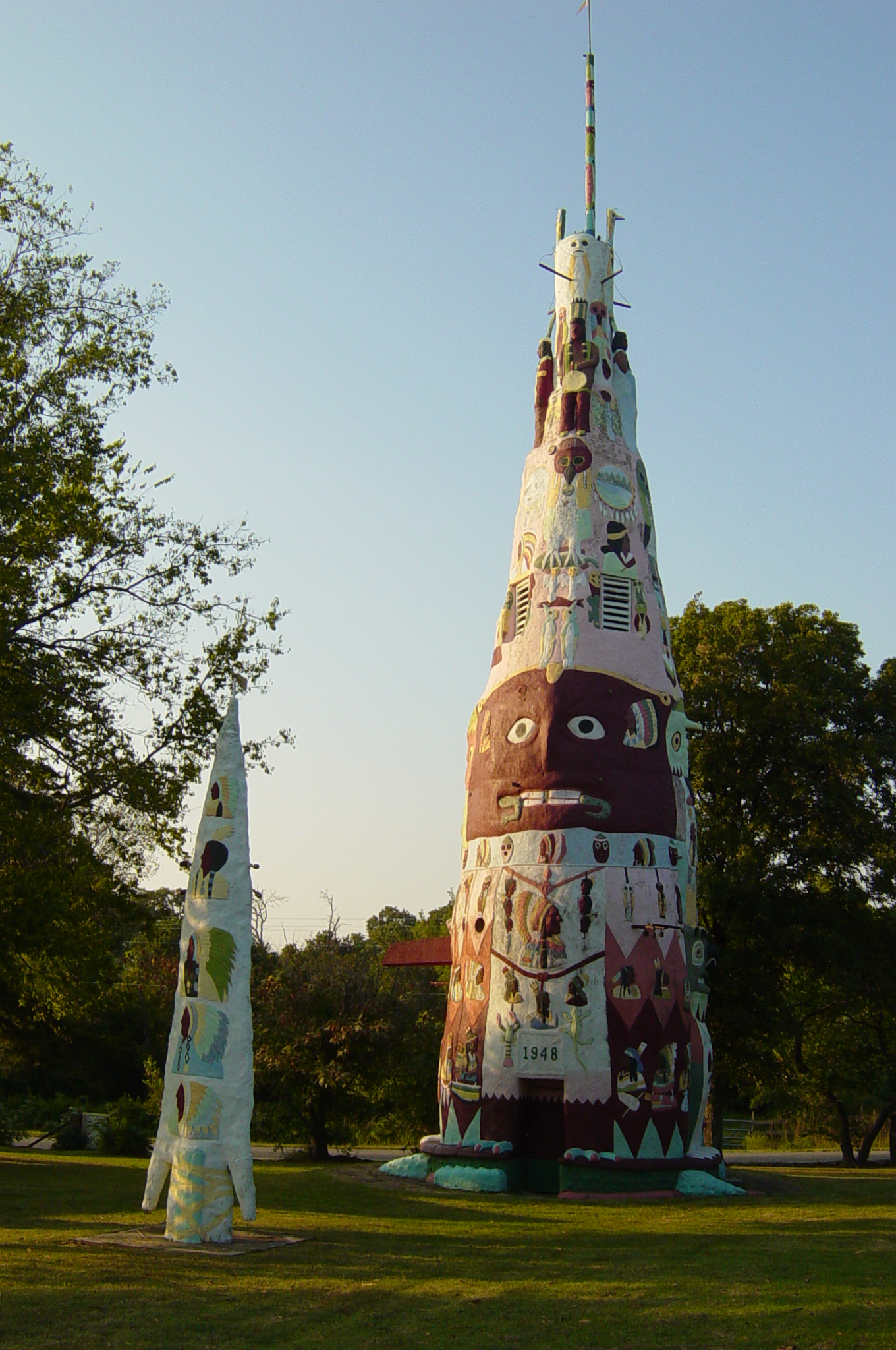
- Ed Galloway's Totem Pole Park

- Location within Oklahoma Location within the United States
- Nearest city: Foyil, Oklahoma
- Coordinates: 36°26′14″N 95°26′53″W
- Area: 1.4 acres (0.57 ha)
- Built: 1937
- Architect: Nathan Edward Galloway
- NRHP reference No.: 99000354
- Added to NRHP: March 30, 1999

Ed Galloway's Totem Pole Park is a park created by American sculptor, woodcarver, and folk artist Ed Galloway. The site consists of eleven sculptures and one building on 14 acres (57,000 m^{2}) in Rogers County, in northeastern Oklahoma. The park is ten miles (16 km) north-east of Claremore and is located 3.5 miles (5.6 km) east of historic U.S. Route 66 and Foyil. It was added to the National Register of Historic Places on March 30, 1999. The park is now owned and operated by the Rogers County Historical Society. The park's main totem pole is billed as the "World’s Largest Concrete Totem Pole."

== History and creation ==
The park was constructed by Ed Galloway (b. 1880 in Springfield, Missouri; d. 1961 in Foyil, Oklahoma). A US Army veteran who had served in the Philippines, he began carving monumental sculptures from tree trunks when he returned to the United States after his military service. In 1914, his work attracted the interest of Tulsa-based philanthropist Charles Page, who employed him as a manual arts teacher at the Children's Home orphanage in Sand Springs, Oklahoma.

Upon his retirement in 1937, Galloway moved to a small farm near Foyil, located 10 miles (16 km) north-east of Claremore and 3.5 miles (5.6 km) east of historic U.S. Route 66. He soon began work on a totem pole, which he built using modern building materials, including six tons of steel, 28 tons of cement, and 100 tons of sand and rock. In 1948, Galloway completed the totem pole, which had a completed height of approximately 90 ft (27 m). At its base, the totem pole is 30 ft (9.1 m) wide, and it rests on the back of a turtle, referring to a Native American creation story about the world. The entire totem pole is decorated with approximately 200 bas relief images, which include brightly colored Native American portraits, symbols, and animal figures.

The park also features Galloway's eleven-sided "Fiddle House," which is supported inside and out by 25 concrete totem poles. It previously housed his hand-carved fiddles, handmade furniture, and bas relief portraits of all of the US Presidents up to John F. Kennedy. Many of the items in the Fiddle House were stolen in 1970 and never recovered. The park also contains four smaller concrete totems, two ornate concrete picnic tables with animal-form seats, a barbecue, and four sets of animal-form gateposts.

Galloway lived at and worked on the park every day up to his death in 1962 of cancer. Some say that he hoped to use his work to educate young people about Native Americans, but others say that he thought the park would be a good place for youngsters, Boy Scouts in particular, to visit.

== Renovation ==
In the decades following Galloway's death, the sculptures began to deteriorate from weather and neglect. In the 1990s, the Kansas Grassroots Art Association led an extensive restoration effort. The outdoor sculptures were restored and repainted. The Fiddle House was brought back from the brink of collapse, and adapted as the Fiddle House Museum and Gift Shop.

Further restoration on the main totem pole's lower 20’ was done in the 2008-2009 timeframe. Work on the upper section was begun in mid-June 2015, and completed by mid-August 2020.
