= Bushyhead, Oklahoma =

- CDP
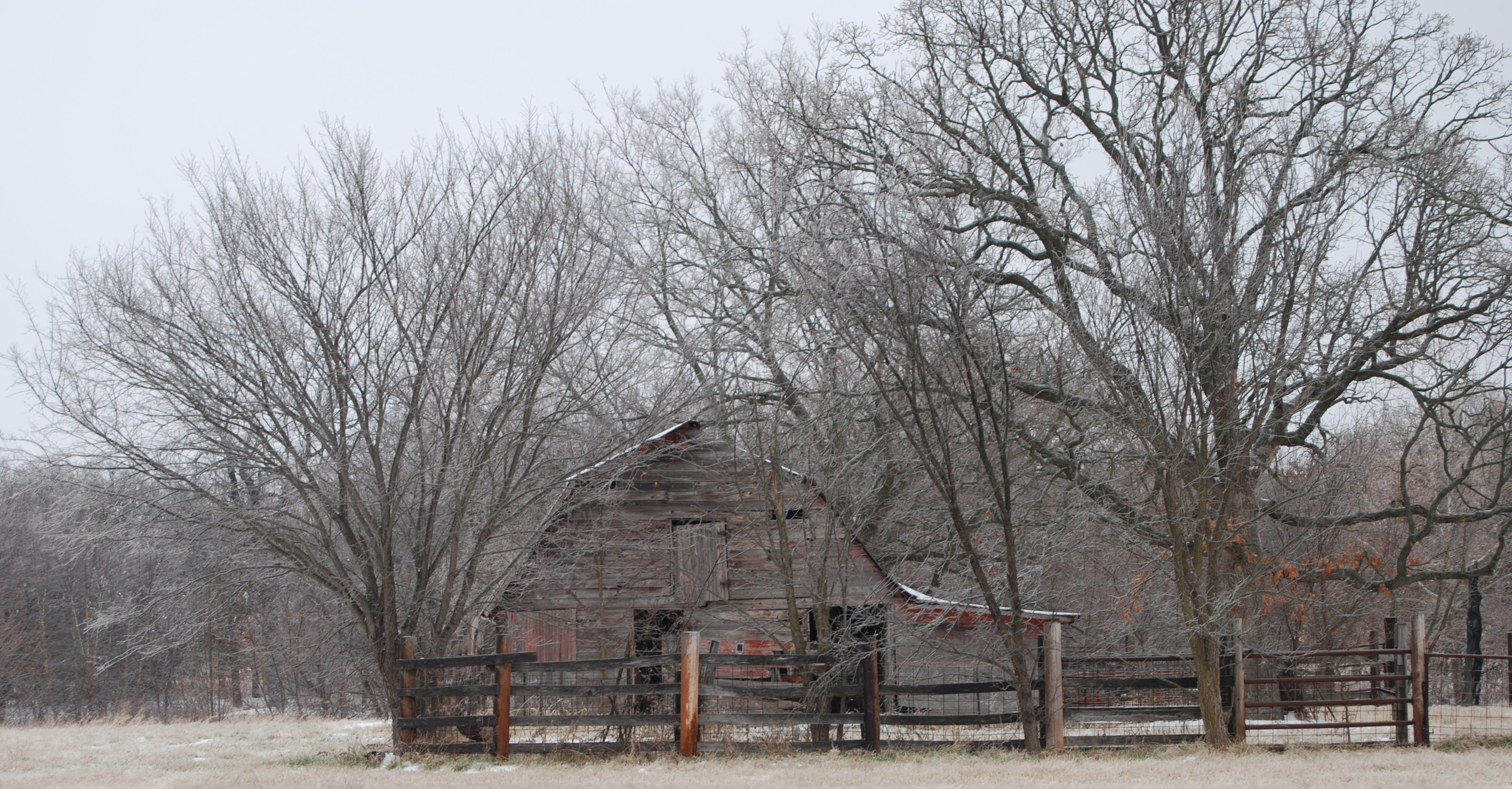
- Dilapidated barn in Bushyhead

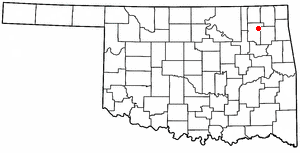
- Location of Bushyhead, Oklahoma
- Coordinates: 36°27′34″N 95°29′09″W
- Country: United States
- State: Oklahoma
- County: Rogers

Area
  - Total: 14.93 sq mi (38.68 km^{2})
  - Land: 14.91 sq mi (38.62 km^{2})
  - Water: 0.023 sq mi (0.06 km^{2})
- Elevation: 820 ft (250 m)

Population (2020)
  - Total: 1,292
  - Density: 86.6/sq mi (33.45/km^{2})
- Time zone: UTC-6 (Central (CST))
  - Summer (DST): UTC-5 (CDT)
- ZIP code: 74016
- Area codes: 539/918
- FIPS code: 40-10400
- GNIS feature ID: 2407929

Bushyhead is a census-designated place (CDP) in Rogers County, Oklahoma, United States. The population was 1,292 at the 2020 census, a 1.68% percent decrease over the figure of 1,314 recorded in 2010. Established on the St. Louis-San Francisco Railway between Claremore and Vinita, the community was named for Dennis W. Bushyhead, Principal Chief of the Cherokee, 1879–1887. The post office existed from April 18, 1898, until November 15, 1955.

== Geography ==
According to the United States Census Bureau, the CDP has a total area of 15.0 square miles (39 km^{2}), of which 15.0 square miles (39 km^{2}) is land and 0.04 square miles (0.10 km^{2}) (0.20%) is water.

== Demographics ==
Historical population
Census	Pop.	Note	%±
2000	1,203		—
2010	1,314		9.2%
2020	1,292		−1.7%
U.S. Decennial Census

=== 2020 census ===
As of the 2020 census, Bushyhead had a population of 1,292. The median age was 39.7 years. 24.1% of residents were under the age of 18 and 16.7% of residents were 65 years of age or older. For every 100 females there were 103.8 males, and for every 100 females age 18 and over there were 95.6 males age 18 and over.

0.0% of residents lived in urban areas, while 100.0% lived in rural areas.

There were 472 households in Bushyhead, of which 30.9% had children under the age of 18 living in them. Of all households, 59.7% were married-couple households, 15.9% were households with a male householder and no spouse or partner present, and 19.5% were households with a female householder and no spouse or partner present. About 20.5% of all households were made up of individuals and 10.0% had someone living alone who was 65 years of age or older.

There were 532 housing units, of which 11.3% were vacant. The homeowner vacancy rate was 1.5% and the rental vacancy rate was 0.0%.

Racial composition as of the 2020 census
Race	Number	Percent
White	779	60.3%
Black or African American	6	0.5%
American Indian and Alaska Native	266	20.6%
Asian	3	0.2%
Native Hawaiian and Other Pacific Islander	2	0.2%
Some other race	27	2.1%
Two or more races	209	16.2%
Hispanic or Latino (of any race)	75	5.8%

=== 2000 census ===
As of the census of 2000, there were 1,203 people, 431 households, and 344 families residing in the CDP. The population density was 80.3 inhabitants per square mile (31.0/km^{2}). There were 474 housing units at an average density of 31.7 per square mile (12.2/km^{2}). The racial makeup of the CDP was 74.56% White, 0.33% African American, 18.12% Native American, 0.83% from other races, and 6.15% from two or more races. Hispanic or Latino of any race were 2.00% of the population.

There were 431 households, out of which 37.4% had children under the age of 18 living with them, 68.0% were married couples living together, 6.7% had a female householder with no husband present, and 20.0% were non-families. 16.2% of all households were made up of individuals, and 4.4% had someone living alone who was 65 years of age or older. The average household size was 2.79 and the average family size was 3.09.

In the CDP, the population was spread out, with 30.7% under the age of 18, 7.1% from 18 to 24, 28.3% from 25 to 44, 25.3% from 45 to 64, and 8.6% who were 65 years of age or older. The median age was 35 years. For every 100 females, there were 104.2 males. For every 100 females age 18 and over, there were 101.0 males.

The median income for a household in the CDP was $33,438, and the median income for a family was $34,779. Males had a median income of $29,408 versus $22,009 for females. The per capita income for the CDP was $13,140. About 11.6% of families and 13.4% of the population were below the poverty line, including 16.3% of those under age 18 and 9.7% of those age 65 or over.
