= Oklahoma State Highway 88 =

State highway in Oklahoma, United States

State Highway 88

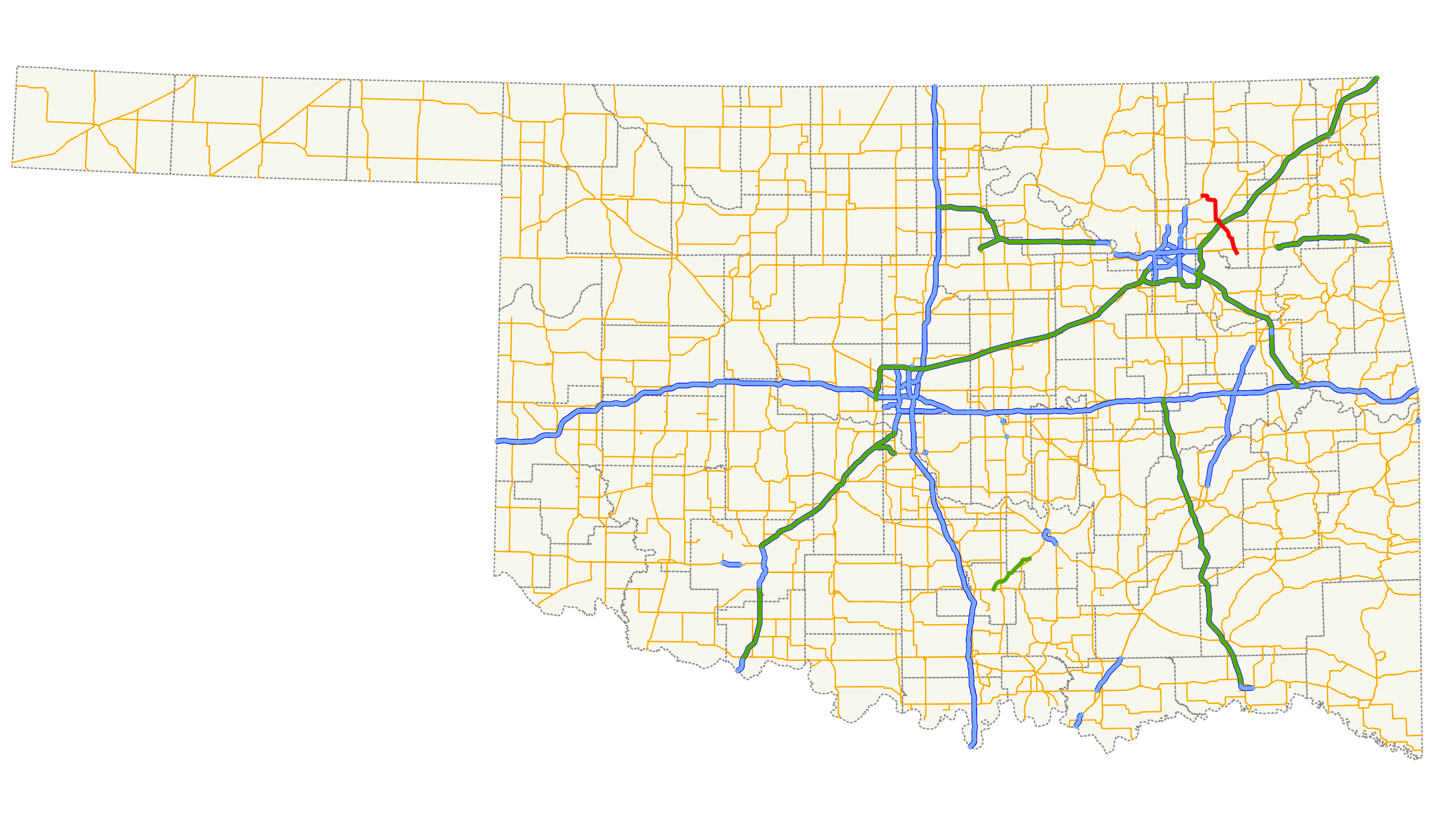

Route information
- Maintained by ODOT
- Length: 26.0 mi (41.8 km)
- Existed: ca. 1940–present

Major junctions
- South end: Inola
- US 412 near Inola; SH-20 / SH-66 in Claremore
- North end: US 169 in Oologah

Location
- Country: United States
- State: Oklahoma

Highway system
- Oklahoma State Highway System; Interstate; US; State; Turnpikes
← SH-87	→ SH-89

State Highway 88, abbreviated to SH-88 or OK-88, is a state highway in Oklahoma. It runs for 26.0 miles (42 km) north–south through Rogers County. It has no lettered spur routes.

SH-88 dates back to 1940 or early 1941.

== Route description ==
SH-88 begins in Inola and heads northwest out of town, paralleling a Union Pacific rail line. It has an interchange with an old alignment of SH-33, followed by an interchange with SH-33's successor, U.S. Highway 412. From US-412, the route continues northwest, crossing over Inola Creek near its source. Approximately one mile later, the highway passes near the McFarlin railroad siding. Further northwest, the highway passes through unincorporated Tiawah. It then crosses the Tiawah Hills and Panther Creek. The highway then passes under Interstate 44, the Will Rogers Turnpike, though no interchange exists. It then enters the town of Claremore.

In Claremore, SH-88 has a brief concurrency with both SH-66 and SH-20. After emerging from the west side of town, the highway turns onto a due north course, which it continues along until it reaches Lake Oologah. It then turns west, running along the south shore of the lake. Upon reaching the lake's southwest corner, it crosses the dam. The highway turns back to the north, running west of the lake, before turning back west toward Oologah. It then ends at US-169 in Oologah.

== History ==
State Highway 88 is first shown on the April 1941 state highway map, implying it was commissioned sometime between then and April 1940, when the previous map was published. SH-88 had an entirely gravel surface at that time. The 1948 map is the first that shows SH-88 with a wholly paved driving surface.

Prior to the construction of the Lake Oologah Dam, Highway 88 proceeded on a more southerly course north of Claremore, crossing the Verdigris River downstream of the current dam location and ending at US-169 south of Oologah. The 1965 map is the first to show the route crossing Oologah Dam. The route has had no further major changes since then.

== Junction list ==
The entire route is in Rogers County.

Location	mi	km	Destinations	Notes
Inola	0.0	0.0	Commercial Street	Southern terminus
	0.5	0.80	EW590 Road	Formerly part of SH-33
	0.9	1.4	US-412	Partial cloverleaf interchange
Claremore	13.0	20.9	SH-66	Southern end of SH-66 concurrency
Claremore	13.1	21.1	SH-20	Southern end of SH-20 concurrency
Claremore	13.2	21.2	SH-66	Northern end of SH-66 concurrency
Claremore	14.0	22.5	SH-20	Northern end of SH-20 concurrency
Oologah	26.0	41.8	US-169	Northern terminus
1.000 mi = 1.609 km; 1.000 km = 0.621 mi: Concurrency terminus
