= Sequoyah, Oklahoma =

Sequoyah, Oklahoma ᏏᏉᏯ (Cherokee)
- CDP
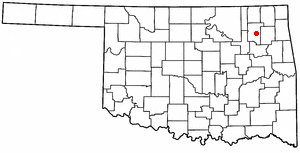
- Location of Sequoyah, Oklahoma
- Coordinates: 36°22′47″N 95°35′49″W
- Country: United States
- State: Oklahoma
- County: Rogers

Area
  - Total: 7.94 sq mi (20.56 km^{2})
  - Land: 7.94 sq mi (20.56 km^{2})
  - Water: 0 sq mi (0.00 km^{2})
- Elevation: 745 ft (227 m)

Population (2020)
  - Total: 730
  - Density: 92/sq mi (35.5/km^{2})
- Time zone: UTC-6 (Central (CST))
  - Summer (DST): UTC-5 (CDT)
- FIPS code: 40-66450
- GNIS feature ID: 2409307

Sequoyah (Cherokee: ᏏᏉᏯ, romanized: Siquoya) is a census-designated place (CDP) in Rogers County, Oklahoma, United States. As of the 2020 census, Sequoyah had a population of 730.

== Geography ==
According to the United States Census Bureau, the CDP has a total area of 8.0 square miles (21 km^{2}), all land.

== Demographics ==
Historical population
Census	Pop.	Note	%±
2020	730		—
U.S. Decennial Census

=== 2020 census ===
As of the 2020 census, Sequoyah had a population of 730. The median age was 44.3 years. 20.4% of residents were under the age of 18 and 20.0% of residents were 65 years of age or older. For every 100 females there were 101.7 males, and for every 100 females age 18 and over there were 102.4 males age 18 and over.

0.0% of residents lived in urban areas, while 100.0% lived in rural areas.

There were 283 households in Sequoyah, of which 26.9% had children under the age of 18 living in them. Of all households, 56.9% were married-couple households, 18.7% were households with a male householder and no spouse or partner present, and 18.7% were households with a female householder and no spouse or partner present. About 24.7% of all households were made up of individuals and 11.6% had someone living alone who was 65 years of age or older.

There were 293 housing units, of which 3.4% were vacant. The homeowner vacancy rate was 0.4% and the rental vacancy rate was 0.0%.

Racial composition as of the 2020 census
Race	Number	Percent
White	534	73.2%
Black or African American	3	0.4%
American Indian and Alaska Native	87	11.9%
Asian	3	0.4%
Native Hawaiian and Other Pacific Islander	1	0.1%
Some other race	14	1.9%
Two or more races	88	12.1%
Hispanic or Latino (of any race)	53	7.3%

=== 2000 census ===
As of the census of 2000, there were 671 people, 238 households, and 199 families residing in the CDP. The population density was 83.6 inhabitants per square mile (32.3/km^{2}). There were 248 housing units at an average density of 30.9 per square mile (11.9/km^{2}). The racial makeup of the CDP was 79.14% White, 0.15% African American, 12.67% Native American, 0.15% Pacific Islander, 0.15% from other races, and 7.75% from two or more races. Hispanic or Latino of any race were 1.79% of the population.

There were 238 households, out of which 36.6% had children under the age of 18 living with them, 77.7% were married couples living together, 3.4% had a female householder with no husband present, and 16.0% were non-families. 13.0% of all households were made up of individuals, and 6.7% had someone living alone who was 65 years of age or older. The average household size was 2.82 and the average family size was 3.07.

In the CDP, the population was spread out, with 27.7% under the age of 18, 4.3% from 18 to 24, 28.9% from 25 to 44, 27.6% from 45 to 64, and 11.5% who were 65 years of age or older. The median age was 39 years. For every 100 females, there were 100.3 males. For every 100 females age 18 and over, there were 100.4 males.

The median income for a household in the CDP was $43,542, and the median income for a family was $50,417. Males had a median income of $32,969 versus $31,250 for females. The per capita income for the CDP was $19,189. About 7.8% of families and 5.8% of the population were below the poverty line, including none of those under age 18 and 34.5% of those age 65 or over.
