= Rogers County, Oklahoma =

County in Oklahoma, United States

- County
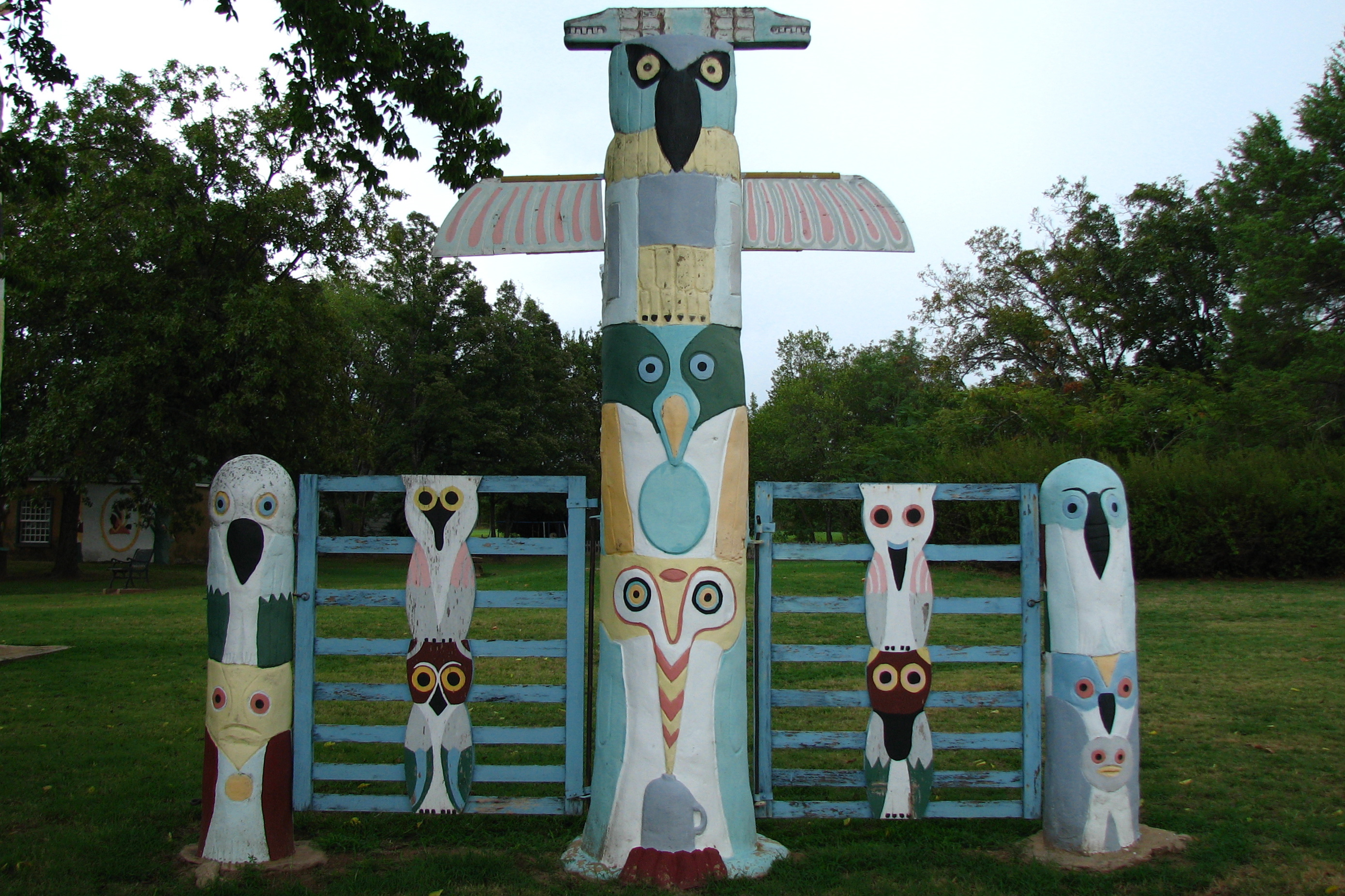
- Ed Galloway's Totem Pole Park

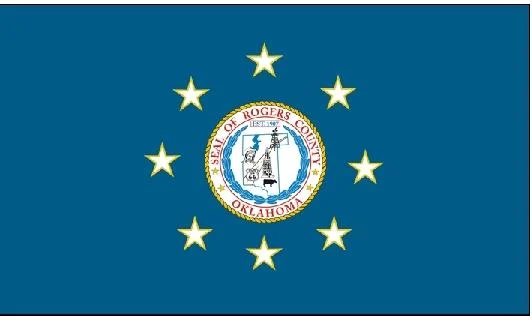
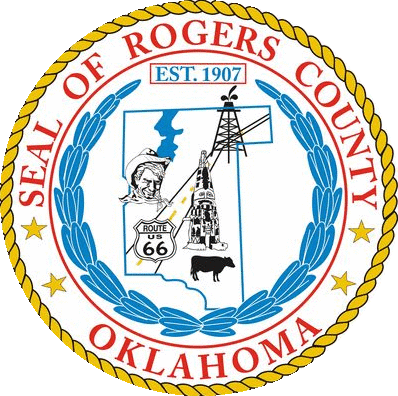
- Flag Seal

- Location within the U.S. state of Oklahoma
- Coordinates: 36°18′38.35″N 95°37′1.48″W
- Country: United States
- State: Oklahoma
- Founded: January 26, 1907
- Named for: Clement Vann Rogers
- Seat: Claremore
- Largest city: Claremore
- Other cities: Catoosa, Collinsville, Owasso, Tulsa

Government
  - Chairman: Steve Hendrix

Area
  - Total: 711 sq mi (1,840 km^{2})
  - Land: 676 sq mi (1,750 km^{2})
  - Water: 36 sq mi (93 km^{2}) 5.0%

Population (2020)
  - Total: 95,240
  - Estimate (2025): 102,197 ▲
  - Density: 141/sq mi (54.4/km^{2})
- Time zone: UTC−6 (Central)
  - Summer (DST): UTC−5 (CDT)
- ZIP Codes: 74015, 74016, 74017, 74018, 74019, 74031, 74036, 74053, 74080
- Area code: 539, 918
- Congressional districts: 1st, 2nd
- Website: www.rogerscounty.org

Rogers County is a county located in the northeastern part of the U.S. state of Oklahoma. As of the 2020 census, the population was 95,240, making it the sixth-most populous county in Oklahoma. The county seat is Claremore. Rogers County is included in the Tulsa metropolitan area.

Created in 1907 from the western Saline District of the Cherokee Nation, this area was named the Cooweescoowee District, and Cooweescoowee County at the time of statehood. However, the residents protested, and the name was changed to Rogers County, after Clem Vann Rogers, a prominent Cherokee rancher, and father of Will Rogers.

== History ==
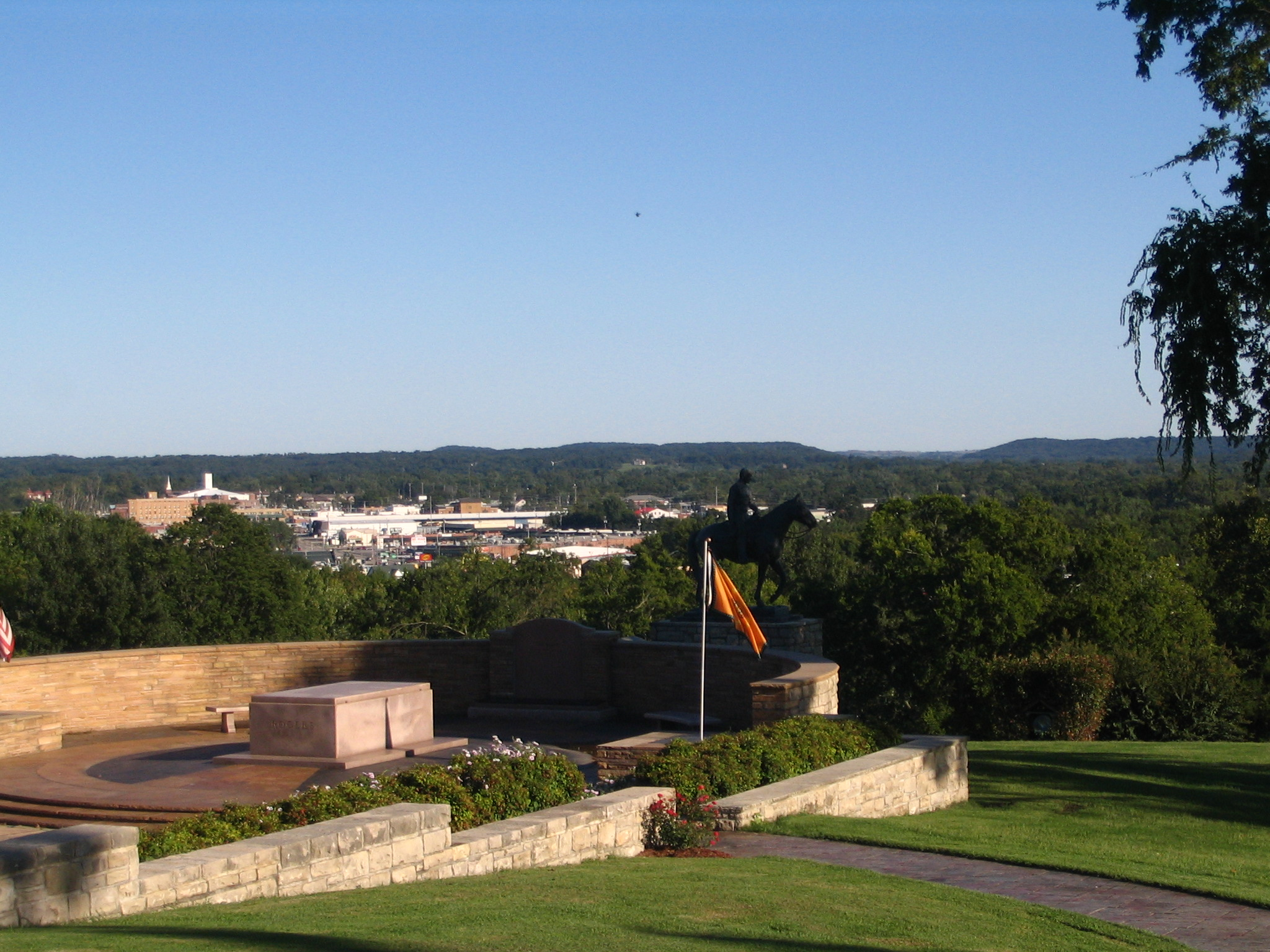
View of Claremore's skyline

According to the Encyclopedia of Oklahoma History and Culture, the Arkansas Band of the Osage Nation settled in the Three Forks area (the junction of the Arkansas River, Grand River, and Verdigris River during the 1760s and established two villages called Pasuga and Pasona in what is now Rogers County. Pasona was near an ancient earthwork platform mound near the Verdigris River. It was later called Claremore Mound, to honor Osage chief Claremore (aka Gra-mon in Osage, meaning Arrow Going Home; his name was first recorded by French colonists as Clermont.)

In 1828, Cherokee bands who had left the Southeast early exchanged their Arkansas land for an area that included present-day Rogers County. This had been ceded by the Osage in 1825 under a treaty to the United States. The area became organized by the Cherokee Nation as the Saline District of their portion of Indian Territory. In 1907 the western portion of that district was organized as the Cooweescoowee District.

Upon statehood in 1908, the district was designated as a county named Cooweescoowee. Residents supported renaming the county in honor of Clement Vann Rogers, an early Cherokee settler and prominent rancher here.

Shortly after statehood, Eastern University Preparatory School was established on College Hill, just west of Claremore, Oklahoma. The Oklahoma Military Academy, established in 1919, took over the facility. In 1971 the academy was closed and the facility was converted for use by Claremore Junior College. As a four-year curriculum and graduate departments were added, the state legislature renamed the institution as Rogers State College and Rogers University, before settling in 1998 on the current Rogers State University.

== Geography ==
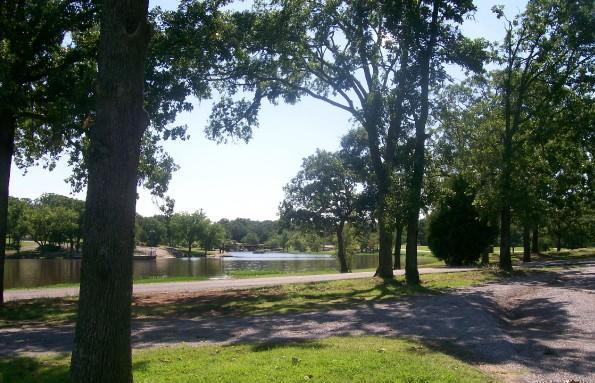
Claremore Lake

According to the U.S. Census Bureau, the county has a total area of 711 square miles (1,840 km^{2}), of which 676 square miles (1,750 km^{2}) is land and 36 square miles (93 km^{2}) (5.0%) is water. The largest body of water is Lake Oologah. The main streams are the Caney River and the Verdigris River. There are also several smaller creeks and lakes in the county.

=== Adjacent counties ===
- Nowata County (north)
- Craig County (northeast)
- Mayes County (east)
- Wagoner County (south)
- Tulsa County (southwest)
- Washington County (northwest)

== Demographics ==
Historical population
Census	Pop.	Note	%±
1910	17,736		—
1920	17,605		−0.7%
1930	18,956		7.7%
1940	21,078		11.2%
1950	19,532		−7.3%
1960	20,614		5.5%
1970	28,425		37.9%
1980	46,436		63.4%
1990	55,170		18.8%
2000	70,641		28.0%
2010	86,905		23.0%
2020	95,240		9.6%
2025 (est.)	102,197	▲	7.3%
U.S. Decennial Census; 1790–1960 1900–1990; 1990–2000 2010–2019

=== 2021 estimates ===
As of 2021, its median household income was $69,322 and 9.7% lived at or below the poverty line.

=== 2020 census ===
As of the 2020 census, the county had a population of 95,240. Of the residents, 24.0% were under the age of 18 and 17.4% were 65 years of age or older; the median age was 39.8 years. For every 100 females there were 99.0 males, and for every 100 females age 18 and over there were 96.9 males.

The racial makeup of the county was 67.0% White, 1.2% Black or African American, 13.0% American Indian and Alaska Native, 1.8% Asian, 2.1% from some other race, and 14.8% from two or more races. Hispanic or Latino residents of any race comprised 5.5% of the population.

There were 35,179 households in the county, of which 33.4% had children under the age of 18 living with them and 20.7% had a female householder with no spouse or partner present. About 21.3% of all households were made up of individuals and 9.7% had someone living alone who was 65 years of age or older.

There were 37,798 housing units, of which 6.9% were vacant. Among occupied housing units, 78.1% were owner-occupied and 21.9% were renter-occupied. The homeowner vacancy rate was 1.7% and the rental vacancy rate was 7.3%.

=== 2010 census ===
As of the 2010 census, there were 86,905 people, 31,884 households, and 24,088 families residing in the county. The population density was 105 inhabitants per square mile (41 inhabitants/km^{2}). There were 27,476 housing units at an average density of 41 units per square mile (16/km^{2}). The racial makeup of the county was 75.3% White, 1.0% Black or African American, 13.1% Native American, 1.1% Asian (0.5% Hmong, 0.1% Filipino, 0.1% Indian), 0.1% Pacific Islander, 1.4% from other races, and 8.1% from two or more races. Of the population 3.7% were Hispanic or Latino of any race (2.7% Mexican, 0.3% Puerto Rican, 0.2% Spanish, 0.1% Peruvian). 18.1% were of German, 13.8% Irish, 8.7% English, 3.0% French, 2.5% Scottish, and 2.2% Italian ancestries.

As of 2010, there were 31,884 households, out of which 38.40% had children under the age of 18 living with them, 65.60% were married couples living together, 8.90% had a female householder with no husband present, and 21.90% were non-families. Of all households, 19.00% were made up of individuals, and 7.50% had someone living alone who was 65 years of age or older. The average household size was 2.71 and the average family size was 3.10. In the county, the population was spread out, with 28.70% under the age of 18, 7.40% from 18 to 24, 28.60% from 25 to 44, 24.00% from 45 to 64, and 11.30% who were 65 years of age or older. The median age was 36 years. For every 100 females, there were 96.80 males. For every 100 females age 18 and over, there were 94.40 males.

As of 2010, its median income for a household in the county was $58,434 and the median income for a family was $67,691. The per capita income for the county was $26,400. About 7.2% of families and 9.9% of the population were below the poverty line, including 13.3% of those under age 18 and 7.3% of those aged 65 or over.

Of its population as of 2006, 96.7% spoke English, 1.7% Spanish, and 0.4% German as their first language.

== Politics ==
Voter Registration and Party Enrollment as of June 30, 2023
Party	Number of Voters	Percentage
Republican	39,220	63.76%
Democratic	12,293	19.98%
Libertarian	527	0.86%
Unaffiliated	9,473	15.40%
Total	61,513	100%

United States presidential election results for Rogers County, Oklahoma
Year	Republican		Democratic		Third party(ies)	
Year	No.	%	No.	%	No.	%
1908	1,134	39.46%	1,599	55.64%	141	4.91%
1912	1,258	37.66%	1,637	49.01%	445	13.32%
1916	1,435	36.98%	1,900	48.96%	546	14.07%
1920	2,844	51.53%	2,459	44.56%	216	3.91%
1924	2,207	41.29%	2,901	54.28%	237	4.43%
1928	3,477	61.38%	2,147	37.90%	41	0.72%
1932	1,879	26.00%	5,347	74.00%	0	0.00%
1936	3,119	41.86%	4,290	57.58%	42	0.56%
1940	4,086	50.20%	4,028	49.49%	25	0.31%
1944	3,739	53.75%	3,209	46.13%	8	0.12%
1948	2,849	40.43%	4,197	59.57%	0	0.00%
1952	4,873	55.99%	3,830	44.01%	0	0.00%
1956	4,487	58.49%	3,185	41.51%	0	0.00%
1960	5,412	63.08%	3,167	36.92%	0	0.00%
1964	4,202	43.54%	5,449	56.46%	0	0.00%
1968	4,631	44.37%	2,665	25.53%	3,141	30.09%
1972	9,697	76.19%	2,607	20.48%	424	3.33%
1976	7,318	49.40%	7,368	49.73%	129	0.87%
1980	11,581	62.12%	6,399	34.33%	662	3.55%
1984	16,137	72.40%	6,013	26.98%	138	0.62%
1988	12,940	59.22%	8,771	40.14%	140	0.64%
1992	12,455	44.65%	8,257	29.60%	7,180	25.74%
1996	12,883	50.41%	9,544	37.35%	3,127	12.24%
2000	17,713	61.18%	10,813	37.35%	425	1.47%
2004	24,976	67.70%	11,918	32.30%	0	0.00%
2008	27,743	72.03%	10,772	27.97%	0	0.00%
2012	27,553	75.07%	9,148	24.93%	0	0.00%
2016	30,913	75.65%	7,902	19.34%	2,047	5.01%
2020	34,031	76.38%	9,589	21.52%	933	2.09%
2024	35,942	76.63%	10,146	21.63%	814	1.74%

== Communities ==
=== Cities ===
- Catoosa
- Claremore (county seat)
- Collinsville (primarily in Tulsa County)
- Owasso (primarily in Tulsa County)
- Tulsa (primarily in Tulsa County)

=== Towns ===
- Chelsea
- Fair Oaks (primarily in Wagoner County)
- Foyil
- Inola
- Oologah
- Talala
- Valley Park
- Verdigris

=== Census-designated places ===
- Bushyhead
- Gregory
- Justice
- Limestone
- Sequoyah
- Tiawah

=== Unincorporated communities ===
- Jamestown
- Keetonville

== Education ==
School districts include:

K-12:

- Catoosa Public Schools
- Chelsea Public Schools
- Chouteau-Mazie Public Schools
- Claremore Public Schools
- Collinsville Public Schools
- Foyil Public Schools
- Inola Public Schools
- Oologah-Talala Public Schools
- Owasso Public Schools
- Sequoyah Public Schools
- Verdigris Public Schools

K-8:

- Justus-Tiawah Public Schools

The Big Cabin School District covered parts of the county until its 1992 dissolution. It merged into the Vinita school district.

== Transportation ==
=== Major highways ===
- I-44 / Will Rogers Turnpike
- US 169
- US 412
- SH-20
- SH-28
  - SH-28A
- SH-66
- SH-88
- SH-167
- SH-266

== NRHP sites ==
The following sites in Rogers County are listed on the National Register of Historic Places:

- I.W.W. Beck Building, Oologah
- The Belvidere, Claremore
- Chelsea Motel, Chelsea
- Claremore Auto Dealership, Claremore
- Eastern University Preparatory School, Claremore
- Ed Galloway's Totem Pole Park, Foyil
- Hanes Home, Sageeyah
- Hogue House, Chelsea
- Mendenhall's Bath House, Claremore
- Maurice Meyer Barracks, Claremore
- Oologah Bank, Oologah
- Oologah Pump, Oologah
- Pryor Creek Bridge, Chelsea
- Will Rogers Birthplace, Oologah
- Will Rogers Hotel, Claremore
- Verdigris Club Lodge, Catoosa
