= Keetonville, Oklahoma =

Keetonville
- Unincorporated community
- Location within the state of Oklahoma Keetonville (the United States)
- Coordinates: 36°18′23″N 95°42′30″W
- Country: United States
- State: Oklahoma
- County: Rogers
- Elevation: 610 ft (190 m)
- Time zone: UTC-6 (Central (CST))
  - Summer (DST): UTC-5 (CDT)
- GNIS feature ID: 1100545

Keetonville is an unincorporated community in Rogers County, Oklahoma, United States. It is 5.2 mi (8.4 km) west of Claremore.
