= Foyil, Oklahoma =

- Town
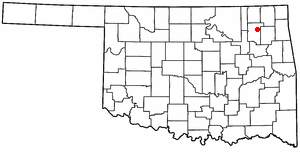
- Location of Foyil, Oklahoma
- Coordinates: 36°25′49″N 95°31′14″W
- Country: United States
- State: Oklahoma
- County: Rogers
- Established: 1910

Government
  - Type: Town

Area
  - Total: 0.83 sq mi (2.14 km^{2})
  - Land: 0.83 sq mi (2.14 km^{2})
  - Water: 0 sq mi (0.00 km^{2})
- Elevation: 728 ft (222 m)

Population (2020)
  - Total: 368
  - Density: 444.5/sq mi (171.63/km^{2})
- Time zone: UTC-6 (Central (CST))
  - Summer (DST): UTC-5 (CDT)
- ZIP code: 74031
- Area codes: 539/918
- FIPS code: 40-27600
- GNIS feature ID: 2412650
- Website: foyilok.town

Foyil is a town in Rogers County, Oklahoma, United States. It was named for Alfred Foyil, a local landowner and the first postmaster of the town. As of the 2020 census, Foyil had a population of 368.

== Geography ==
Foyil is 10 miles (16 km) northeast of Claremore and 9 miles (14 km) southwest of Chelsea. It lies on Oklahoma State Highway 66, formerly U.S. Route 66, just south of its junction with Oklahoma State Highway 28.

According to the United States Census Bureau, the town has a total area of 0.4 square miles (1.0 km^{2}), all land.

== Demographics ==
Historical population
Census	Pop.	Note	%±
1920	109		—
1930	184		68.8%
1940	170		−7.6%
1950	146		−14.1%
1960	127		−13.0%
1970	164		29.1%
1980	191		16.5%
1990	86		−55.0%
2000	234		172.1%
2010	344		47.0%
2020	368		7.0%
U.S. Decennial Census

=== 2020 census ===
As of the 2020 census, Foyil had a population of 368. The median age was 35.0 years. 30.4% of residents were under the age of 18 and 10.6% of residents were 65 years of age or older. For every 100 females there were 94.7 males, and for every 100 females age 18 and over there were 104.8 males age 18 and over.

0.0% of residents lived in urban areas, while 100.0% lived in rural areas.

There were 133 households in Foyil, of which 48.1% had children under the age of 18 living in them. Of all households, 45.1% were married-couple households, 22.6% were households with a male householder and no spouse or partner present, and 21.8% were households with a female householder and no spouse or partner present. About 18.0% of all households were made up of individuals and 6.1% had someone living alone who was 65 years of age or older.

There were 164 housing units, of which 18.9% were vacant. The homeowner vacancy rate was 5.1% and the rental vacancy rate was 17.8%.

Racial composition as of the 2020 census
Race	Number	Percent
White	218	59.2%
Black or African American	0	0.0%
American Indian and Alaska Native	84	22.8%
Asian	1	0.3%
Native Hawaiian and Other Pacific Islander	0	0.0%
Some other race	5	1.4%
Two or more races	60	16.3%
Hispanic or Latino (of any race)	12	3.3%

=== 2000 census ===
As of the census of 2000, there were 234 people, 97 households, and 68 families residing in the town. The population density was 657.2 inhabitants per square mile (253.7/km^{2}). There were 112 housing units at an average density of 314.6 per square mile (121.5/km^{2}). The racial makeup of the town was 79.06% White, 9.40% Native American, 1.71% from other races, and 9.83% from two or more races. Hispanic or Latino of any race were 2.56% of the population.

There were 97 households, out of which 23.7% had children under the age of 18 living with them, 57.7% were married couples living together, 11.3% had a female householder with no husband present, and 28.9% were non-families. 23.7% of all households were made up of individuals, and 12.4% had someone living alone who was 65 years of age or older. The average household size was 2.41 and the average family size was 2.83.

In the town, the population was spread out, with 21.8% under the age of 18, 6.8% from 18 to 24, 22.6% from 25 to 44, 33.3% from 45 to 64, and 15.4% who were 65 years of age or older. The median age was 44 years. For every 100 females, there were 95.0 males. For every 100 females age 18 and over, there were 88.7 males.

The median income for a household in the town was $23,125, and the median income for a family was $28,500. Males had a median income of $27,083 versus $24,107 for females. The per capita income for the town was $11,260. About 31.9% of families and 33.7% of the population were below the poverty line, including 37.7% of those under the age of eighteen and 15.6% of those 65 or over.
