= Chelsea, Oklahoma =

- Town
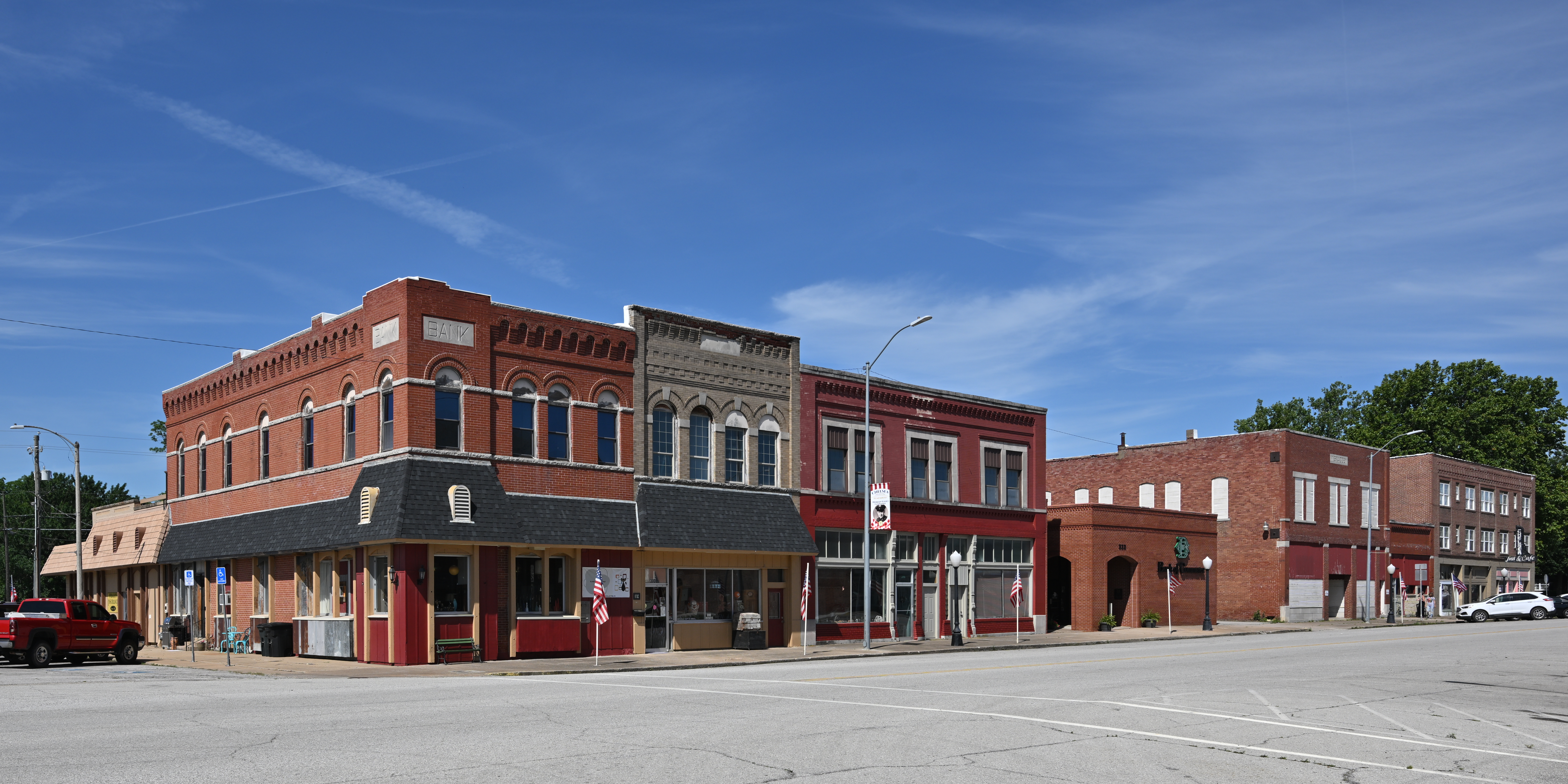

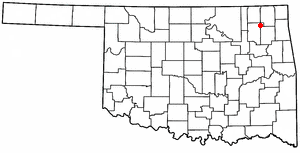
- Location in Oklahoma
- Coordinates: 36°31′55″N 95°26′04″W
- Country: United States
- State: Oklahoma
- County: Rogers

Area
  - Total: 1.78 sq mi (4.60 km^{2})
  - Land: 1.78 sq mi (4.60 km^{2})
  - Water: 0 sq mi (0.00 km^{2})
- Elevation: 715 ft (218 m)

Population (2020)
  - Total: 1,991
  - Density: 1,120.2/sq mi (432.52/km^{2})
- Time zone: UTC-6 (Central)
  - Summer (DST): UTC-5
- ZIP code: 74016
- Area codes: 539/918
- FIPS code: 40-13700
- GNIS feature ID: 2413192

Chelsea is a town in Rogers County, Oklahoma, United States. As of the 2020 census, Chelsea had a population of 1,991. Chelsea was named after the area in London, England, by Charles Peach, a railroad official who was a native of London. The town was the site of the Chelsea-Alluwe Oil Field, which produced a significant amount of oil from circa 1910 until the early 1920s, before it played out. Will Rogers attended a subscription school on Cherokee Land in Chelsea.

== History ==
In 1881, Chelsea began as a stop on the Atlantic and Pacific Railroad. A post office was established in November 1882. The community incorporated as a town in the Cherokee Nation, Indian Territory, in 1889. The town was surveyed and platted in 1902. The Bank of Chelsea, the first state bank in Indian Territory, began operation in March 1896.

The town economy has historically rested on farming, ranching and oil production. Important farm products were oats, corn, wheat and pecans. A flour mill built circa 1892 was one of Chelsea's original industries. Chelsea became noted as a shipping point for cattle and hay before statehood in 1907. The Chelsea-Alluwe oil field was discovered southwest of Chelsea in 1889 by the United States Oil and Gas Company.

According to the American Oil & Gas Historical Society, Edward Byrd, whose wife was a Cherokee woman, discovered oil seeps in 1882 southwest Chelsea, which was then part of the Cherokee Nation in Indian Territory. He apparently took no action to exploit his discovery until 1887, when he and William B. Linn, a Pennsylvanian, and a group of investors from Kansas organized the United States Oil and Gas Company (USOGC). The company subsequently leased drilling rights from the Cherokee Nation on 100,000 acres (400 km^{2}) of land lying west of Chelsea between the St. Louis and San Francisco Railroad and the Verdigris River. USOGC completed its first well in 1890, on Spencer Creek. It was a rudimentary operation, compared to productive sites completed a few years later. The well began producing a half barrel of good-quality crude per day from a depth of only 36 feet (11 m). This was enough for USOGC enthusiasts to claim it was, "... the first oil well in Oklahoma."

Chelsea's claim to the first oil well proved to be untrue. Although USOGC drilled ten other wells on its lease in the next two years, the total production was said to be only 12 barrels, economically insignificant, after which the company ceased operating. The Cherokee Oil and Gas Company then took over the lease. By then, the Cherokee government had limited the size of each lease to 12,000 acres (49 km^{2}). It and other companies later drilled more productive wells which proved economically viable. The whole area became known as the Chelsea-Alluwe Oil Field. Significant production dropped after 1916 and the oil companies stopped work in this field shortly after.

== Geography ==
Chelsea is 19 miles (31 km) northeast of Claremore and 47 miles (76 km) northeast of Tulsa.

According to the United States Census Bureau, the city has a total area of 1.7 square miles (4.4 km^{2}), all land.

== Demographics ==
Historical population
Census	Pop.	Note	%±
1900	566		—
1910	1,350		138.5%
1920	1,692		25.3%
1930	1,527		−9.8%
1940	1,642		7.5%
1950	1,437		−12.5%
1960	1,541		7.2%
1970	1,622		5.3%
1980	1,754		8.1%
1990	1,620		−7.6%
2000	2,136		31.9%
2010	1,964		−8.1%
2020	1,991		1.4%
U.S. Decennial Census

=== 2020 census ===
As of the 2020 census, Chelsea had a population of 1,991. The median age was 35.3 years. 26.3% of residents were under the age of 18 and 15.9% of residents were 65 years of age or older. For every 100 females there were 90.3 males, and for every 100 females age 18 and over there were 85.7 males age 18 and over.

0.0% of residents lived in urban areas, while 100.0% lived in rural areas.

There were 781 households in Chelsea, of which 36.6% had children under the age of 18 living in them. Of all households, 39.2% were married-couple households, 18.6% were households with a male householder and no spouse or partner present, and 33.3% were households with a female householder and no spouse or partner present. About 27.1% of all households were made up of individuals and 12.3% had someone living alone who was 65 years of age or older.

There were 924 housing units, of which 15.5% were vacant. The homeowner vacancy rate was 3.4% and the rental vacancy rate was 13.1%.

Racial composition as of the 2020 census
Race	Number	Percent
White	1,147	57.6%
Black or African American	9	0.5%
American Indian and Alaska Native	465	23.4%
Asian	2	0.1%
Native Hawaiian and Other Pacific Islander	0	0.0%
Some other race	8	0.4%
Two or more races	360	18.1%
Hispanic or Latino (of any race)	33	1.7%

=== 2000 census ===
As of the census of 2000, there were 2,136 people, 835 households, and 539 families residing in the city. The population density was 1,267.4 inhabitants per square mile (489.3/km^{2}). There were 961 housing units at an average density of 570.2 per square mile (220.2/km^{2}). The racial makeup of the city was 64.93% White, 25.70% Native American, 0.33% Asian, 0.09% Pacific Islander, 0.09% from other races, and 8.85% from two or more races. Hispanic or Latino of any race were 0.89% of the population.

There were 835 households, out of which 35.2% had children under the age of 18 living with them, 45.4% were married couples living together, 14.4% had a female householder with no husband present, and 35.4% were non-families. 32.0% of all households were made up of individuals, and 16.2% had someone living alone who was 65 years of age or older. The average household size was 2.51 and the average family size was 3.19.

In the city the population was spread out, with 30.4% under the age of 18, 9.0% from 18 to 24, 25.3% from 25 to 44, 18.5% from 45 to 64, and 16.8% who were 65 years of age or older. The median age was 33 years. For every 100 females, there were 85.9 males. For every 100 females age 18 and over, there were 79.9 males.

The median income for a household in the city was $24,127, and the median income for a family was $29,432. Males had a median income of $29,018 versus $19,875 for females. The per capita income for the city was $12,889. About 14.9% of families and 18.8% of the population were below the poverty line, including 19.6% of those under age 18 and 24.3% of those age 65 or over.

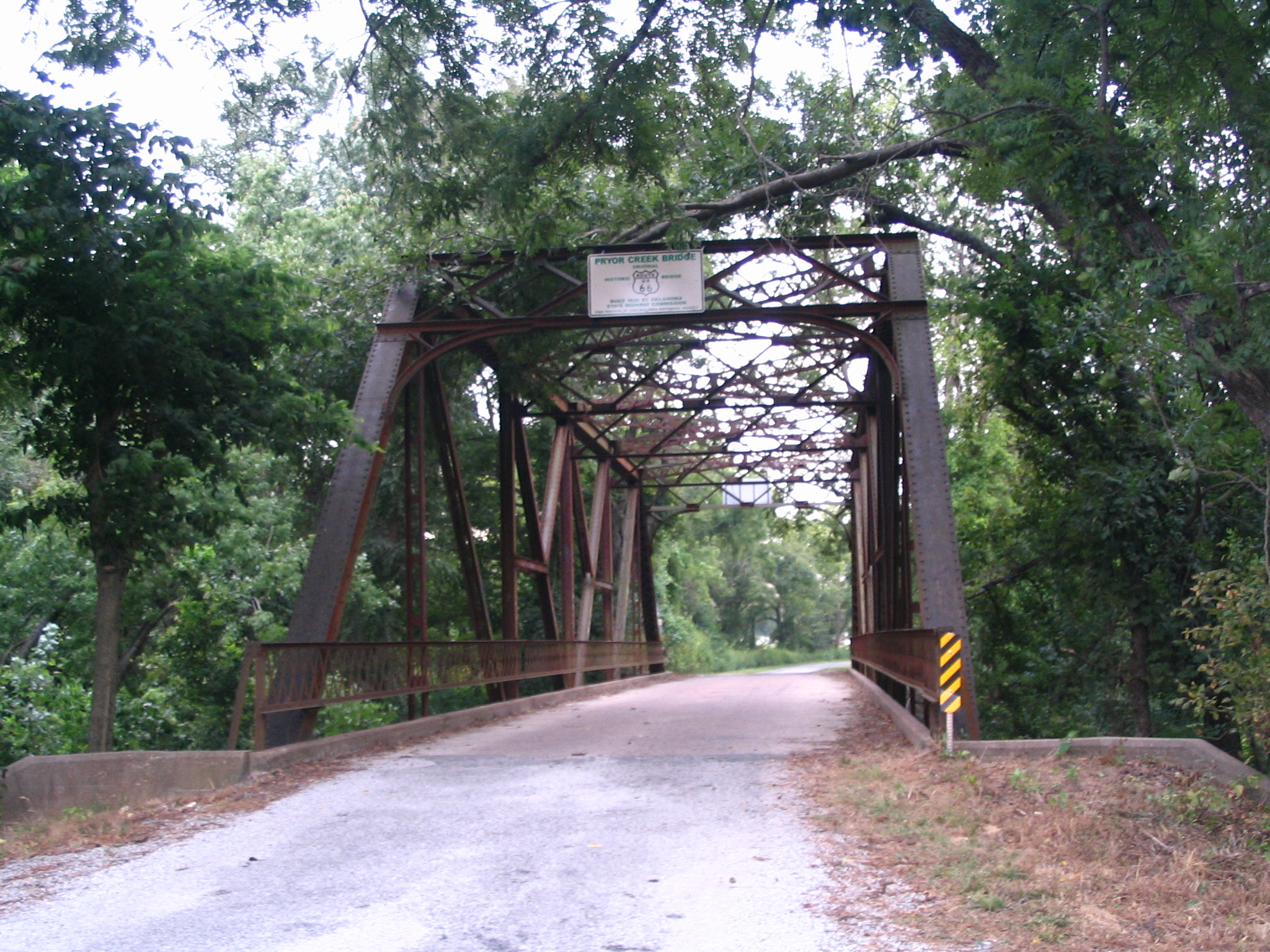
Pryor Creek Bridge

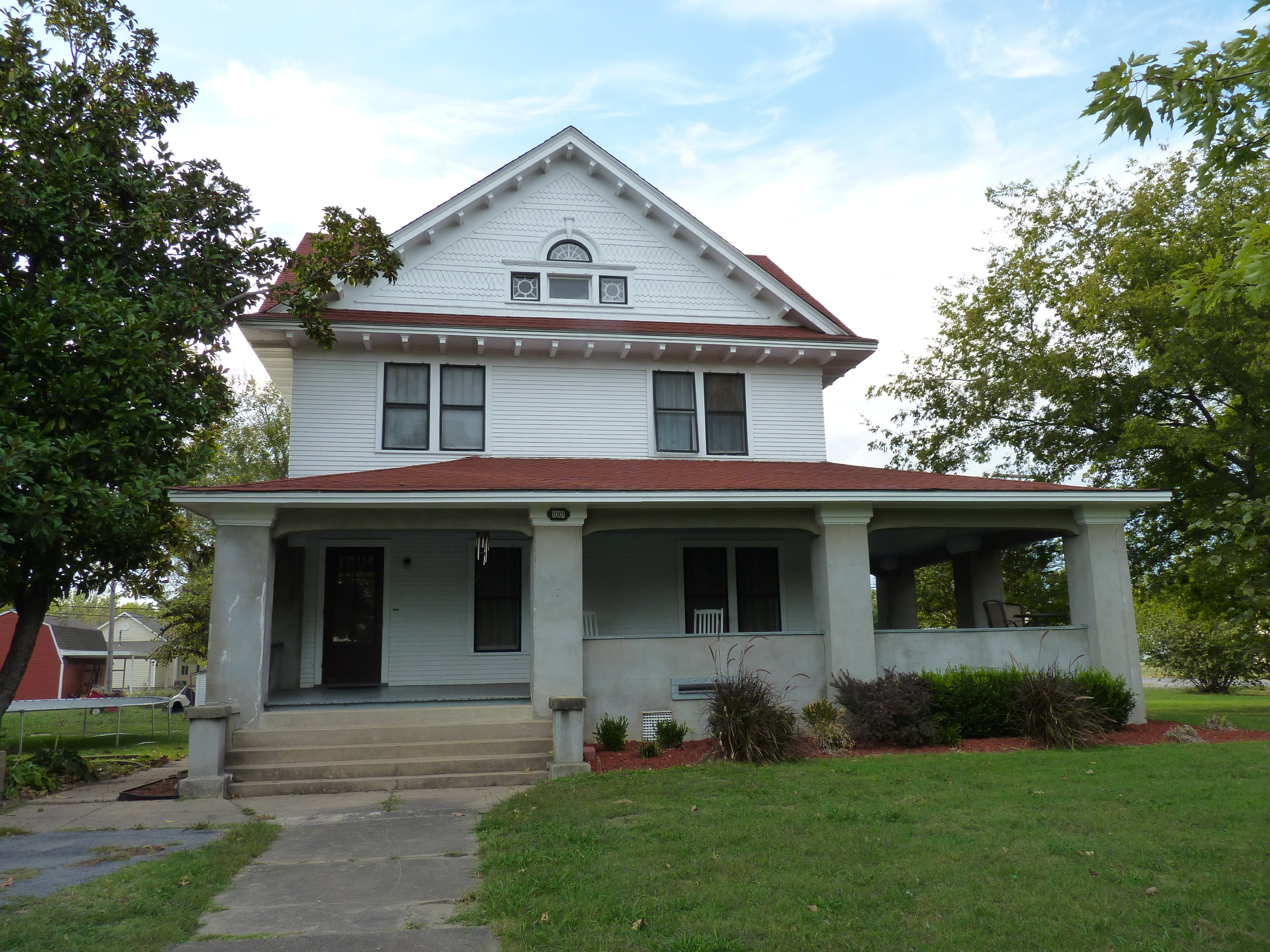
Hogue House

== Education ==
Chelsea High School is a 2A School with Grades K-12. In 1998 the Chelsea High School boys track team won the state championship. In 2007 the Chelsea High School Varsity cheerleading squad won the state championship. Also in 2007 the Chelsea High School Softball team won state championship. In 2013, the Chelsea Academic team won the 3A State Championship. Chelsea is also known for its FFA organization.

== Government and infrastructure ==
In July 2015 all police officers of the Chelsea Police Department quit. They decided to preemptively leave instead of being fired; the police chief was going to be fired and they learned about this plan. The Rogers County Sheriff's Office temporarily took over policing duties. In January 2016 Chelsea hired retired Claremore Police Lt. Rick Jones as the new police chief.

== National Register of Historic Places ==
The following sites in Chelsea are listed on the National Register of Historic Places:

- Chelsea Motel
- Hogue House
- Pryor Creek Bridge

== Notable natives ==
- Actor Gar Moore
- World Series MVP pitcher Ralph Terry (member of Chelsea High School Green Dragons baseball team)
