= U.S. Route 169 in Oklahoma =

Highway in Oklahoma

U.S. Highway 169
- US 169 highlighted in red

Route information
- Maintained by ODOT
- Length: 73.67 mi (118.56 km)
- Existed: 1930–present

Major junctions
- South end: US 64 / Creek Turnpike in Tulsa
- I-44 / SH-66 in Tulsa; I-244 / US 412 in Tulsa; US 60 near Nowata
- North end: US-169 at the Kansas state line in South Coffeyville

Location
- Country: United States
- State: Oklahoma
- Counties: Tulsa, Rogers, Nowata

Highway system
- United States Numbered Highway System; List; Special; Divided; Oklahoma State Highway System; Interstate; US; State; Turnpikes
| ← SH-167 | → SH-171 |

U.S. Route 169 (also known as Mingo Valley Expressway and Pearl Harbor Memorial Expressway in the Tulsa Area) is a U.S. highway that begins in Tulsa southeast of Downtown. The highway runs north into Kansas.

== Route description ==
U.S. 169 begins at an interchange with the Creek Turnpike and U.S. 64 in Tulsa. US-64/US-169 then head north from the Creek Turnpike, and the two routes pass through southeast Tulsa on a due north course, as the Mingo Valley Expressway. Upon reaching the Broken Arrow Expressway (State Highway 51), US-64 splits off toward Downtown Tulsa, while US-169 continues north through east Tulsa. The next interchange US-169 has with another freeway is with I-44; 1.8 miles (2.9 km) to the north of this, it interchanges with I-244. As it continues north, US-169 serves as the western terminus of SH-266. The freeway crosses Bird Creek on new bridges built in 2015-2016 (replacing a pair of 1960-vintage through truss bridges) seven miles (11 km) north of I-44.

US-169 then enters the north Tulsa suburb of Owasso. Here, the freeway's interchange with 2nd Avenue also forms the eastern terminus of SH-135, an unsigned highway. The freeway continues on towards Collinsville, where it has a concurrency with SH-20. North of Collinsville, the freeway ends, and US-169 continues northeast as an at-grade highway. The highway briefly crosses into Rogers County, then re-enters Tulsa County, before returning to Rogers County once again.

In Rogers County, US-169 heads northeast until it reaches the town of Oologah, birthplace of Will Rogers, where it serves as the western terminus for SH-88. South of the town, US-169 crosses Fourmile Creek, a tributary of the Verdigris River; the route will parallel this creek until its source as the road continues north. The highway also runs parallel to a rail line for the remainder of its time in Oklahoma, and several miles to the east, it also parallels the shoreline of Oologah Lake. As the highway passes through northern Rogers County, the highway bisects the town of Talala.

Soon after US-169 crosses from Rogers County to Nowata County, the highway passes through the unincorporated location of Watova, Oklahoma. The route then enters the county seat, Nowata. US-169 Alternate follows the old route of US-169 through downtown Nowata, while mainline US-169 cuts through the eastern side of town. Both branches of US-169 intersect with US-60 in Nowata. North of Nowata, the highway passes to the west of Nowata Municipal Airport, then crosses California Creek, a tributary of the Verdigris. Southeast of Delaware, US-169 meets SH-28 at its western terminus. As US-169 continues north, it passes to the east of Delaware and Lenapah. East of Lenapah, it begins a concurrency with SH-10, which lasts for 4 1/2 miles (7.2 km) before SH-10 splits off to the west. US-169 continues north through unincorporated Elliott, then enters the border town of South Coffeyville. In South Coffeyville, the highway crosses the state line into Montgomery County, Kansas; it continues north towards Coffeyville.

== History ==
US-169 was first designated through Oklahoma on June 17, 1935. Prior to the establishment of US-169, the route north of Collinsville was served by State Highway 16; US-169 replaced this route in its entirety.

== Junction list ==
All exits are unnumbered.

| County | Location | mi | km | Destinations | Notes |
|---|---|---|---|---|---|
| Tulsa | Tulsa | | | SH-364 / Creek Turnpike west / US 64 – Bixby | National southern terminus; southern end of US-64 concurrency |
| Tulsa | Tulsa | 1.5– 1.9 | 2.4– 3.1 | 91st Street South | No northbound exit |
| Tulsa | Tulsa | 1.5– 1.9 | 2.4– 3.1 | SH-364 / Creek Turnpike east – Broken Arrow | Southbound exit and northbound entrance |
| Tulsa | Tulsa | 2.9 | 4.7 | 81st Street South | |
| Tulsa | Tulsa | 3.7 | 6.0 | 71st Street South | |
| Tulsa | Tulsa | 4.7 | 7.6 | 61st Street South | |
| Tulsa | Tulsa | 5.7 | 9.2 | 51st Street South | former southern terminus |
| Tulsa | Tulsa | 6.3 | 10.1 | US 64 west / SH-51 – Sand Springs, Broken Arrow, Muskogee via SH-351 (Turnpike) | Northern end of US-64 concurrency |
| Tulsa | Tulsa | 6.8 | 10.9 | 41st Street South | |
| Tulsa | Tulsa | 7.7 | 12.4 | 31st Street South | |
| Tulsa | Tulsa | 8.7 | 14.0 | 21st Street South | |
| Tulsa | Tulsa | 9.1 | 14.6 | I-44 / SH-66 – Oklahoma City, Joplin | I-44 exit 234A; southbound exit to I-44 WB includes direct ramps to/from 15th Street South; northbound entrance from I-44 WB includes direct entrance ramp from 7th Street South |
| Tulsa | Tulsa | 9.8 | 15.8 | 11th Street South | |
| Tulsa | Tulsa | 10.6 | 17.1 | Admiral Place | Northbound exit and southbound entrance |
| Tulsa | Tulsa | 10.9 | 17.5 | I-244 / US 412 – Tulsa, Joplin | I-244 exits 13B-C |
| Tulsa | Tulsa | 11.8 | 19.0 | Pine Street | |
| Tulsa | Tulsa | 13.8 | 22.2 | 36th Street North | |
| Tulsa | Tulsa | 14.8 | 23.8 | SH-266 east (46th Street North) – Tulsa Port of Catoosa | |
| Tulsa | Tulsa | 15.8 | 25.4 | 56th Street North | |
| Tulsa | Owasso | 17.8 | 28.6 | 76th Street North (SH-135 west) / 66th Street North | SH-135 unsigned |
| Tulsa | Owasso | 18.9 | 30.4 | 86th Street North | |
| Tulsa | Owasso | 20.1 | 32.3 | 96th Street North | |
| Tulsa | | 21.4 | 34.4 | 106th Street North | |
| Tulsa | | 22.4 | 36.0 | SH-20 east (116th Street North) | Southern end of SH-20 concurrency |
| Tulsa | | 23.4 | 37.7 | 126th Street North | |
| Tulsa | | 24.4 | 39.3 | 136th Street North | |
| Tulsa | Collinsville | 25.4 | 40.9 | SH-20 west / 146th Street North – Skiatook | Northern end of SH-20 concurrency; north end of freeway |
| Rogers | Oologah | 33.9 | 54.6 | SH-88 | Western terminus of SH-88 |
| Nowata | Nowata | 50.9 | 81.9 | US 169 Alt. north | |
| Nowata | Nowata | 53.1 | 85.5 | US 60 – Downtown | |
| Nowata | | 57.6 | 92.7 | SH-28 | Western terminus of SH-28 |
| Nowata | Lenapah | 63.6 | 102.4 | SH-10 east | Southern end of SH-10 concurrency |
| Nowata | | 68.1 | 109.6 | SH-10 west | Northern end of SH-10 concurrency |
| Nowata | South Coffeyville | 75.1 | 120.9 | US-169 north – Coffeyville | Continuation into Kansas |
1.000 mi = 1.609 km; 1.000 km = 0.621 mi: Concurrency terminus; Incomplete access
