= St. John African Methodist Episcopal Church =

St. John African Methodist Episcopal Church may refer to:

- St. John African Methodist Episcopal Church (Topeka, Kansas)
- St. John African Methodist Episcopal Church (Frankfort, Kentucky)
- St. John African Methodist Episcopal Church (Omaha, Nebraska)
- St. John African Methodist Episcopal Church (Cleveland, Ohio)
- St. John's African Methodist Episcopal Church (Norfolk, Virginia)
