= National Register of Historic Places listings in Nowata County, Oklahoma =

Location of Nowata County in Oklahoma

This is a list of the National Register of Historic Places listings in Nowata County, Oklahoma.

This is intended to be a complete list of the properties on the National Register of Historic Places in Nowata County, Oklahoma, United States. The locations of National Register properties for which the latitude and longitude coordinates are included below, may be seen in a map.

There are six properties listed on the National Register in the county.

This National Park Service list is complete through NPS recent listings posted April 24, 2026.

== Current listings ==
	Name on the Register	Image	Date listed	Location	City or town	Description
1	Cemetery Patent 110	Cemetery Patent 110	September 9, 2001 (#01000951)	County Road 412, 3.25 miles north of its junction with U.S. Route 60; 36°45′45″N 95°39′53″W	Delaware	
2	Diamond Point Dependent District No. 44 School	Diamond Point Dependent District No. 44 School	September 23, 1996 (#96000977)	Junction of County Roads 409 and 24.5; 36°39′47″N 95°43′12″W	Nowata	
3	Moore Ranch		September 3, 2010 (#10000617)	6 mi west of Nowata on N4070 Rd. 36°46′07″N 95°44′47″W	Nowata	
4	Nowata County Courthouse	Nowata County Courthouse	August 23, 1984 (#84003375)	229 N. Maple St. 36°42′09″N 95°38′16″W	Nowata	
5	Opossum Creek Bridge	Opossum Creek Bridge	March 4, 2009 (#09000077)	County Road NS–413 over Opossum Creek; 36°57′24″N 95°38′34″W	South Coffeyville	
6	United States Post Office Nowata	United States Post Office Nowata	April 17, 2009 (#09000217)	109 N. Pine St. 36°42′02″N 95°38′21″W	Nowata	

== See also ==
- List of National Historic Landmarks in Oklahoma
- National Register of Historic Places listings in Oklahoma
