= U.S. Route 169 =

Highway in the United States

U.S. Route 169
- U.S. 169 highlighted in red

Route information
- Auxiliary route of US 69
- Length: 966 mi (1,555 km)
- Existed: 1930–present

Major junctions
- South end: US 64 at Tulsa, OK
- I-44 at Tulsa, OK; I-35 / US 50 / US 56 at Olathe, KS; I-435 at Lenexa, KS; I-29 / US 71 / US 69 at Kansas City, MO; I-29 at St Joseph, MO; I-80 / US 6 at De Soto, IA; I-90 at Blue Earth, MN; I-494 at Bloomington, MN; I-394 at St. Louis Park, MN; I-94 / I-694 / US 52 at Brooklyn Park, MN
- North end: US 53 near Virginia, MN

Location
- Country: United States
- States: Oklahoma, Kansas, Missouri, Iowa, Minnesota

Highway system
- United States Numbered Highway System; List; Special; Divided

U.S. Route 169 (US 169) is a north-south U.S highway that currently runs for 966 miles (1,555 km) from the city of Virginia, Minnesota, to Tulsa, Oklahoma, at Memorial Drive.

== Route description ==
=== Oklahoma ===
US 169 is a major north–south highway spanning 75.1 miles (120.9 km) in Oklahoma. The southern terminus for US 169 is Memorial Drive. The highway connects Tulsa, Oklahoma to the south with the Kansas state border to the north at South Coffeyville, Oklahoma. US 169 travels through Tulsa, Rogers, and Nowata counties.

US 169 has undergone several widening projects that have brought US 169 to freeway and expressway standards. The highway is mostly two lanes between Talala, Oklahoma, and South Coffeyville, except for several four-lane segments except for a short four-lane portion north of Nowata, Oklahoma, which ends at State Highway 28.

An Alternate US 169 passes through Nowata following the original path of US 169. The alternate route begins at the intersection of Choctaw Avenue and reconnects with US 169 south of Nowata at its intersection with Maple Street.

In January 2005, Oklahoma Department of Transportation began a $16.8 million widening project on a mile-long stretch of US 169 (officially named 'Pearl Harbor Memorial Expressway', although this name is rarely used by Tulsans) from Interstate 244 (I-244) to I-44. The project widened the highway from four to six lanes, adding one lane in each direction. The project was completed in April 2006. This stretch of US 169 is traveled by approximately 106,000 vehicles per day.

=== Kansas ===
US 169 enters the state at Coffeyville as a four-lane road, and is a four-lane highway for about 8.8 miles (14.2 km) till the edge of the Coffeyville Industrial Park. A segment runs around Chanute is a freeway with fully controlled access with center concrete barrier, with two lanes in each direction. US 169 runs concurrently with US 59 and K-31 starting about five miles (8.0 km) south of Garnett and diverges northeast again immediately south of Garnett. The intersection immediately south of Garnett used to be a "braided" intersection with Stop and Yield signs. It was identified as a high crash location in 2001, and was rebuilt as a roundabout that opened in April 2006. The Kansas Department of Transportation is rebuilding or planning to rebuild several other rural intersections as roundabouts for increased safety. In Garnett, 6th Avenue (from US 169 to US 59 is also known as Business US 169. Going south, it veers off from US 169 about a mile and a half north of the US 169/US 59/K-31 roundabout intersection and travels west and south on 6th Avenue from US 169 to US 59/K-31 (Maple St.) before turning south onto US 59/K-31 and running concurrently with them, ending at the US 169/US 59/K-31 roundabout intersection. At Osawatomie the road becomes a full freeway; as well as, running concurrent with K-7. In southern Johnson County 169 becomes an expressway until its junction with I-35 in Olathe.

From this point to the Missouri state line, US 169 alternates between freeways and surface streets. It follows I-35 to Shawnee Mission Parkway in Overland Park, then travels east to Rainbow Boulevard. US 169 then follows surface streets to its junction with I-70 near downtown Kansas City. US 169 and I-70 enter Missouri together just after crossing the Kansas River.

=== Missouri ===
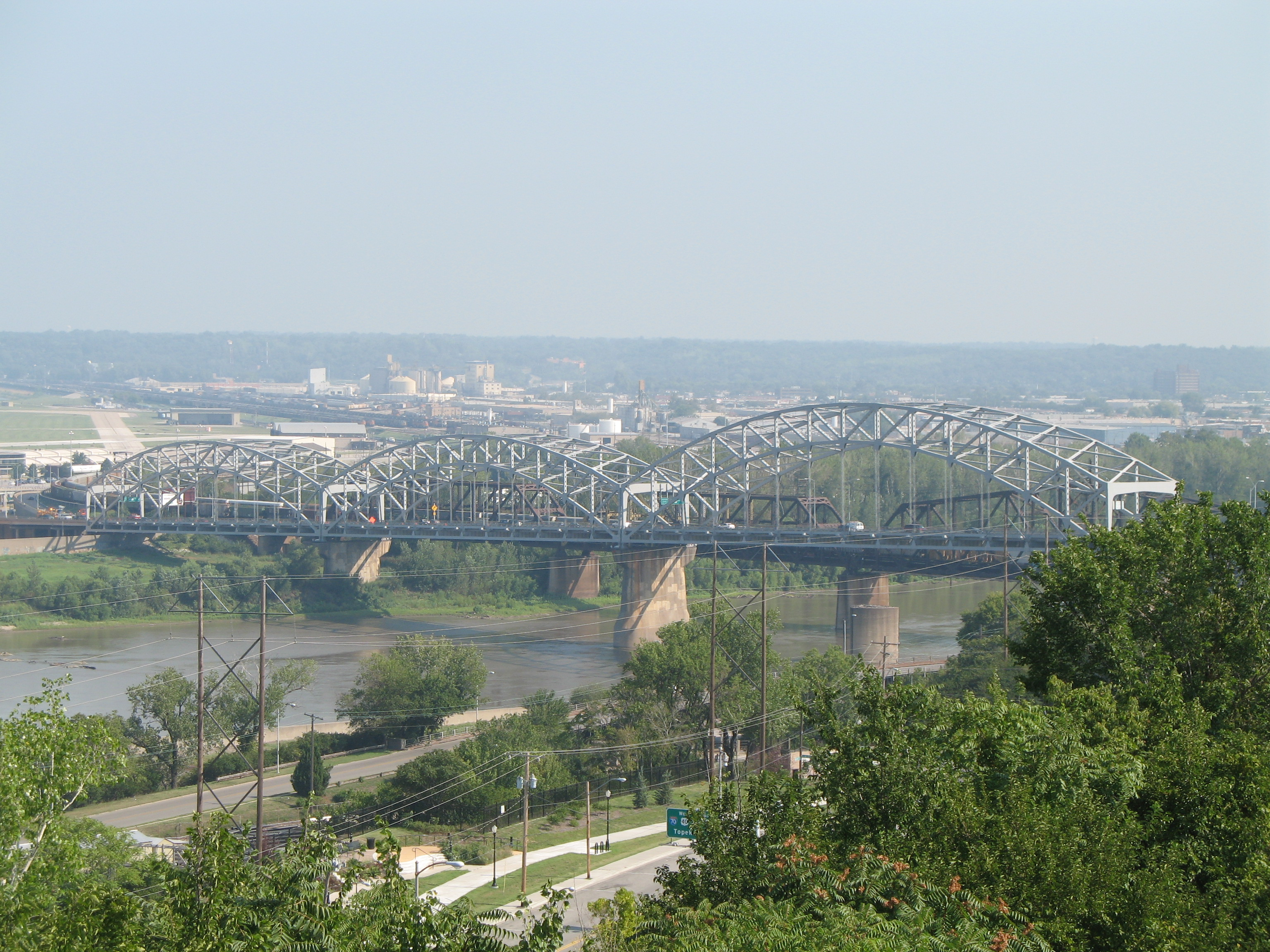
The Buck O'Neil Bridge carries US 169 over the Missouri River in Kansas City

The community of Rochester on US 169 in northwest Missouri.

US 169 exits I-70 shortly after both roads enter Missouri via the Lewis and Clark Viaduct. It crosses the Missouri River by the Buck O'Neil Bridge and serves Kansas City Downtown Airport. Northbound, US 169 becomes a freeway at 5th Street south of the Missouri River, however southbound it ceases being a freeway north of the airport. An at-grade private driveway exists just south of the intersection with Route 9 as well as for airport access. At the northern end of the city, an intersection was reconstructed at NE 108th Street in November 2013. US 169 is a freeway through I-435. This segment is also known as Arrowhead Trafficway, although this road neither passes nor approaches Arrowhead Stadium.

US 169 is a four-lane rural expressway until it reaches Smithville, where it reverts to a two-lane rural highway. In St. Joseph, it forms most of the Belt Highway, a major commercial strip on the eastern edge of town, paralleling just inside I-29. US 169 angles northeastward out of St. Joseph, passing through many rural communities before exiting Missouri north of Grant City.

US 169 intersects I-29 three times in Missouri: once in Gladstone, and twice in St. Joseph.

=== Iowa ===
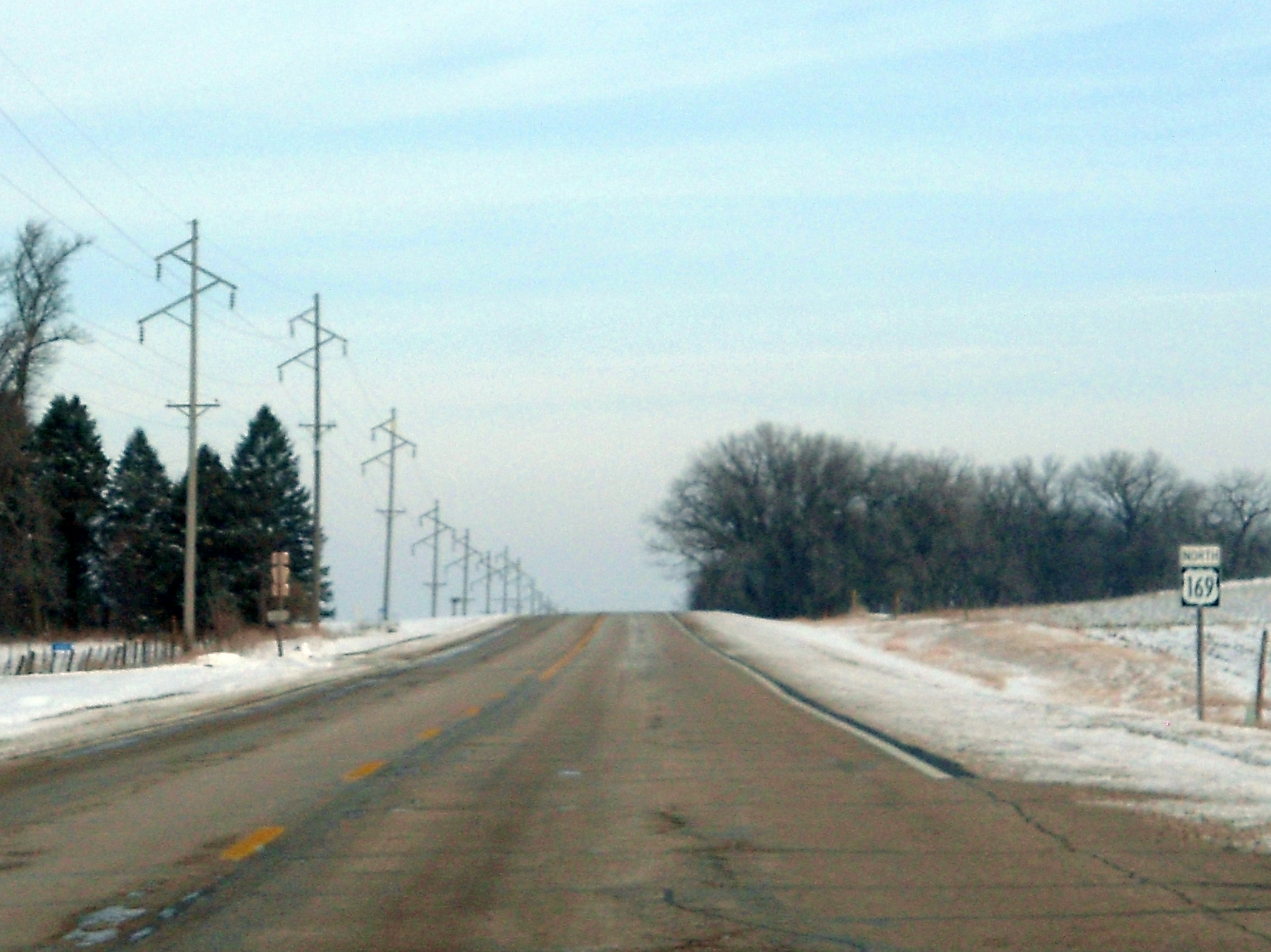
US 169 runs north in Kossuth County, Iowa

US 169 enters Iowa just south of Redding. It intersects I-80 near De Soto. US 169 becomes an expressway at US 20, south of Fort Dodge. At Iowa Highway 7 on the northwest side of Fort Dodge it reverts to a two-lane highway again. US 169 passes through Humboldt and Algona before it leaves Iowa north of Lakota.

=== Minnesota ===
US 169 is a major north–south highway in Minnesota. It enters the state at Elmore. Shortly after, it junctions with I-90 at Blue Earth. It passes Mankato, crossing the Minnesota River. Between Mankato and the Twin Cities, US 169 is largely a rural highway. Before entering Le Sueur, US 169 crosses the Minnesota River again. At Shakopee, US 169 becomes a freeway, crossing the Minnesota River for a third time. The freeway ends in Champlin. US 169 crosses the Mississippi River at Anoka and follows concurrently with US 10 to Elk River, where US 169 splits off northbound through central Minnesota. The rest of the route in Minnesota is largely rural. The route passes the western side of Mille Lacs Lake. It terminates at US 53 in Virginia, in the Iron Range.

== History ==
In Kansas, US 169 used to run concurrent with US 69 from I-35 through Downtown Kansas City, Kansas and the Fairfax District across the Platte Purchase Bridge to I-635 until splitting at I-29 in Missouri.

In Missouri, US 169 replaced Route 1 from Kansas City to St. Joseph, Route 4 from St. Joseph to Stanberry, and all of Route 29 from Stanberry to Iowa. The part of Route 1 north of Kansas City had been Route 33 south of, and Route 50 north of, Grayson from 1922 to 1926.

Prior to 2008, US 169 traveled east on I-435 in Lenexa and Overland Park, Kansas, and then it traveled north on Metcalf Avenue.

Prior to 1981, US 169 entered the Minneapolis, Minnesota.

== Major intersections ==
Oklahoma
US 64 in Tulsa. The highways travel concurrently through Tulsa.
I-44 in Tulsa
I-244 / US 412 in Tulsa
US 60 in Nowata
Kansas
US 166 in Coffeyville. The highways travel concurrently to east-northeast of Coffeyville.
US 160 south-southwest of Cherryvale. The highways travel concurrently for approximately 0.9 miles (1.4 km).
US 400 north-northeast of Cherryvale
US 54 east of Iola
US 59 northeast of Welda. The highways travel concurrently to south of Garnett.
I-35 / US 50 / US 56 in Olathe. I-35/US 169 travels concurrently to Merriam. US 50/US 169 travels concurrently to Lenexa. US 56/US 169 travels concurrently to the Westwood–Mission Woods city line.
I-435 / US 50 in Lenexa
US 69 in Lenexa. The highways travel concurrently to Overland Park.
I-35 in Kansas City
I-70 / US 24 / US 40 / US 69 in Kansas City. I-70/US 24/US 40/US 169 travels concurrently to Kansas City, Missouri.
Missouri
I-35 in Kansas City. The highways travel concurrently through Kansas City.
US 69 southeast of Northmoor
I-29 / US 71 in Gladstone
I-435 in Kansas City
I-29 / US 71 in St. Joseph
US 36 in St. Joseph
I-29 / US 71 in St. Joseph
US 136 in Stanberry. The highways travel concurrently to north-northwest of Darlington.
Iowa
US 34 in Afton. The highways travel concurrently to west of Thayer.
I-80 / US 6 in De Soto. US 6/US 169 travels concurrently to Adel.
US 30 in Ogden. The highways travel concurrently to east-southeast of Beaver.
US 20 south of Fort Dodge
US 18 in Algona
Minnesota
I-90 in Blue Earth
US 14 on the North Mankato–Mankato city line
I-494 in Bloomington
US 212 on the Eden Prairie–Edina city line
I-394 / US 12 on the St. Louis Park–Golden Valley city line
I-94 / I-694 / US 52 on the Maple Grove–Brooklyn Park city line
US 10 in Anoka. The highways travel concurrently to Elk River.
US 2 in Grand Rapids. The highways travel concurrently through Grand Rapids.
US 53 in Virginia

== See also ==
- Special routes of U.S. Route 169

Browse numbered routes
← US-166	KS	→ K-170
← Route 168	MO	→ I-170
← Iowa 165	IA	→ Iowa 173
