= Special routes of U.S. Route 169 =

Special routes of U.S. Route 169

Highway system
- United States Numbered Highway System; List; Special; Divided

Six special routes of U.S. Route 169 exist, one each in Oklahoma, Kansas, Missouri, and Iowa, and two in Minnesota.

== Nowata alternate route ==
U.S. Highway 169 Alternate
- Location: Nowata, Oklahoma
- Length: 2.70 mi (4.35 km)

U.S. Highway 169 Alternate (US 169 Alt.) at Nowata is the only special route for US 169 in Oklahoma. The alternate route travels through Nowata while the main highway bypasses the town. The alternate route is approximately 2.70 miles (4.35 km) long.

The entire route is in Nowata, Nowata County.

mi	km	Destinations	Notes
		US 169	
		US 60	
		US 169	
1.000 mi = 1.609 km; 1.000 km = 0.621 mi

== Garnett business route ==
U.S. Highway 169 Business
- Location: Garnett, Kansas
- Length: 2.8 mi (4.5 km)

U.S. Highway 169 Business (US-169 Bus.) in Garnett is the only special route of US-169 in Kansas. The business route northern terminus is the junction of US-169 and 6th Avenue in Garnett. The main highway bypasses the town to the southeast. The business route travels along 6th Avenue until Maple Street, where it intersects US-59 and K-31 until it ends at its intersection with US-169 at a roundabout south of Garnett in Anderson County.

== Smithville spur ==
U.S. Route 169 Spur
- Location: Smithville, Missouri
- Length: 0.536 mi (863 m)

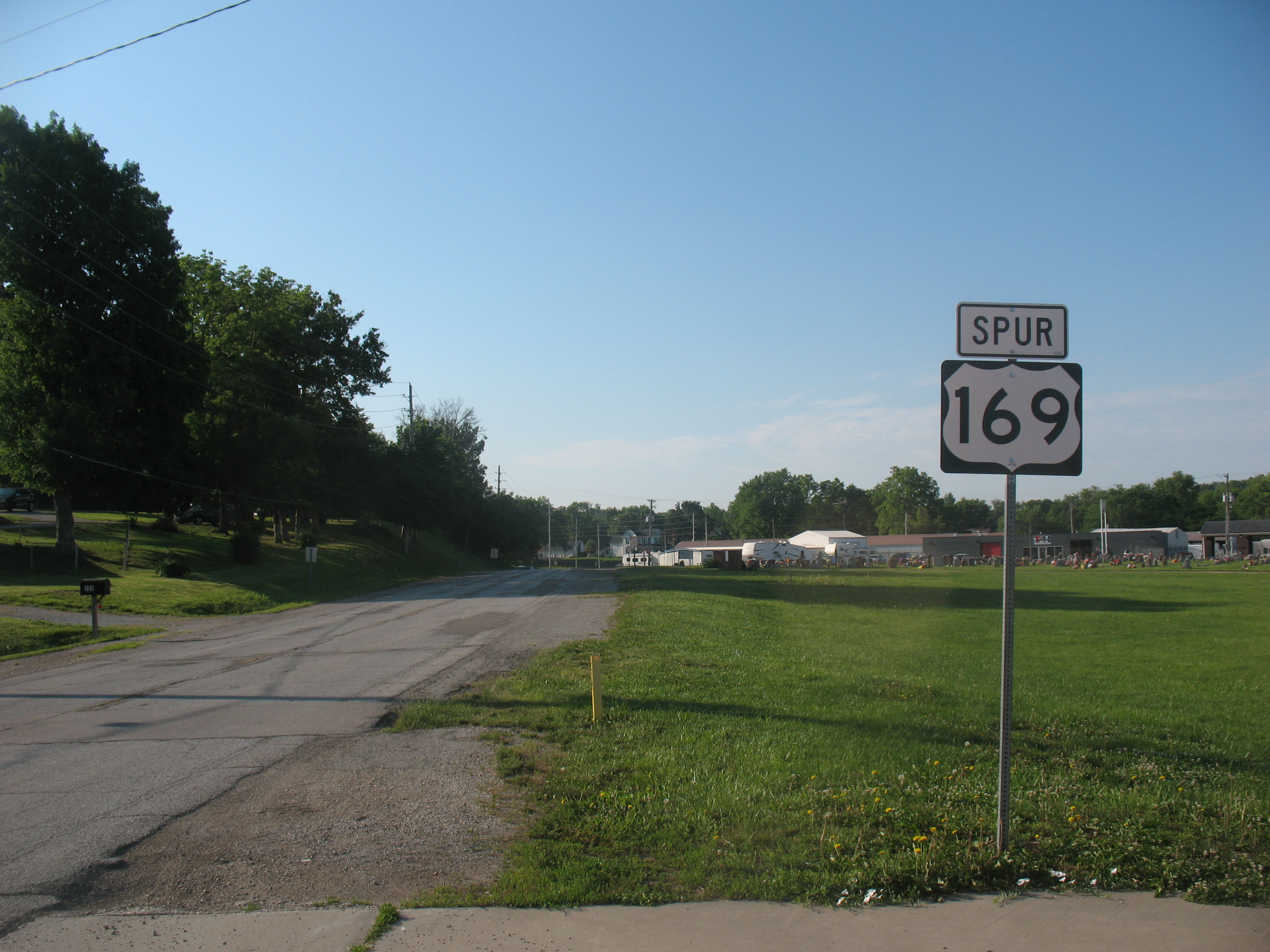
US 169 Spur southbound in Smithville, Missouri

U.S. Route 169 Spur is a 1/2-mile-long (800 m) route in Smithville, Missouri. The spur route follows an old alignment of US 169 into the city center of Smithville, ending at Main Street.

The entire route is in Smithville, Clay County.

mi	km	Destinations	Notes
0.000	0.000	US 169	
0.298	0.480	Route F	
0.536	0.863	Route DD (Main Street)	
1.000 mi = 1.609 km; 1.000 km = 0.621 mi

== Fort Dodge business loop ==
U.S. Highway 169 Business
- Location: Fort Dodge, Iowa
- Length: 3.147 mi (5.065 km)
- Existed: 1990–present

U.S. Route 169 Business (US 169 Bus.) is a 3.1-mile-long (5.0 km) business route in Fort Dodge, Iowa. The route was established in 1990 along former sections of Iowa Highway 7 (Iowa 7) and US 20. Iowa 7 had recently been truncated to its current eastern end at US 169, and US 20 had been rerouted onto a new freeway south of Fort Dodge. Since both routes had viaducts over the Des Moines River, officials in Fort Dodge wanted the Iowa Department of Transportation to maintain the bridges. From its creation until 2014, the route was officially known as Iowa 926, but it was only signed as US 169 Bus. The entire route is in Fort Dodge, Webster County.

mi	km	Destinations	Notes
0.000	0.000	US 169 (Lainson Avenue) / US 20 Bus. west	Southern end of US 20 Bus. concurrency
1.625	2.615	US 20 Bus. east (Kenyon Road)	Northern end of US 20 Bus. concurrency
3.147	5.065	US 169 (Lainson Avenue)	
1.000 mi = 1.609 km; 1.000 km = 0.621 mi: Concurrency terminus

== Shakopee business route ==
U.S. Highway 169 Business
- Location: Shakopee, Minnesota
- Length: 8.9 mi (14.3 km)
- Existed: 1996–present

U.S. Highway 169 Business is a business route in Shakopee, Minnesota. Initially, US 169 took the route of the current business route, going through downtown (co-signed with MN 101) and ending at MN 13. However, in 1996, US 169 was built to bypass around the southern portion of Shakopee to align with the newly built Bloomington Ferry Bridge, which carries US 169.

Between 1996 and early 2015, the previous US 169 had been redirected south and had an at-grade intersection with what was then called CSAH/CR 69. However, in early 2015, a bridge was made over US 169, gaining the US 169 Business signage a year later.

== Hibbing business route ==
U.S. Highway 169 Business
- Location: Hibbing, Minnesota
- Length: 3.0 mi (4.8 km)
- Existed: 1960–present

U.S. Highway 169 Business is a business route in Hibbing, Minnesota. Initially, US 169 ran down what is currently known as 1st Avenue. With construction starting in 1955 and opening in 1960, a redirect had been constructed around the southern and eastern portion of town.
