= Diamond Point School =

- Diamond Point Dependent District No. 44 School
- U.S. National Register of Historic Places
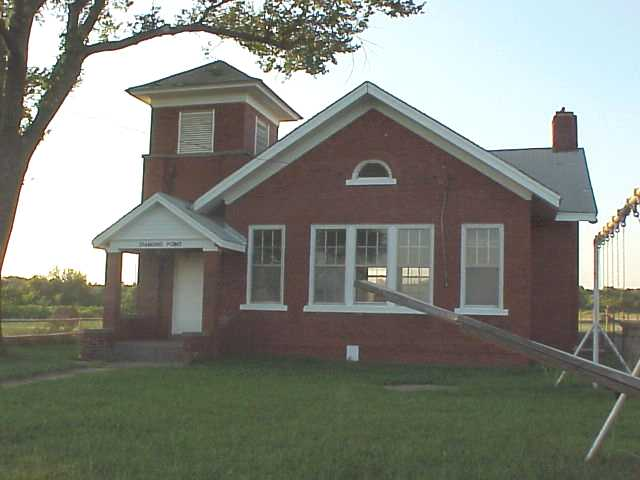
- Diamond Point School

- Location within Oklahoma Location within the United States
- Nearest city: Nowata, Oklahoma
- Coordinates: 36°39′47″N 95°43′13″W
- Area: 1 acre (0.40 ha)
- Architectural style: Bungalow/craftsman
- NRHP reference No.: 96000977
- Added to NRHP: September 23, 1996

The Diamond Point School is a historic one-room school house in Nowata County, Oklahoma, at the junction of county roads 409 and 245. It was built in 1919 and was used through 1968. It is built of red brick and has a bell tower in one corner. It was restored in 1996 and listed on the National Register of Historic Places in 1997. It is set within a 1-acre (4,000 m^{2}) school yard which includes the original playground equipment, including teeter-totters, a wooden merry-go-round, a slide, and a swingset. The grounds also include boys and girls outhouses and a more modern building which includes a kitchen and lunchroom. The school is open for tour by appointment, and is used for reunions, meetings and weddings. It is also used by local schools for "A Day at Diamond Point", a program giving fourth grade students the experience of students in a one-room country schoolhouse during the 1950s.

The listing included four contributing buildings: the school, a combination coalhouse and garage, and two privies. A concrete block pumphouse was deemed non-contributing.
