= Coffeyville Community College =

Public college in Coffeyville, Kansas, US

Coordinates: 37°02′03″N 95°37′23″W

- Type: Public community college
- Established: 1923
- President: Marlon Thornburg
- Faculty: 80
- Students: 1,428 (fall 2023)
- Location: Coffeyville, Kansas, United States
- Campus: Rural community
- Colors: Red & white
- Nickname: Red Ravens
- Website: www.coffeyville.edu

Coffeyville Community College (CCC) is a public community college in Coffeyville, Kansas, United States. It was founded in 1923.

The official school colors are red and white. The mascot is the Red Raven. Their athletic teams are known as the Red Ravens (men) and Lady Ravens (women). Coffeyville Community College is a member of the Kansas Jayhawk Community College Conference and the National Junior College Athletic Association.

== History ==
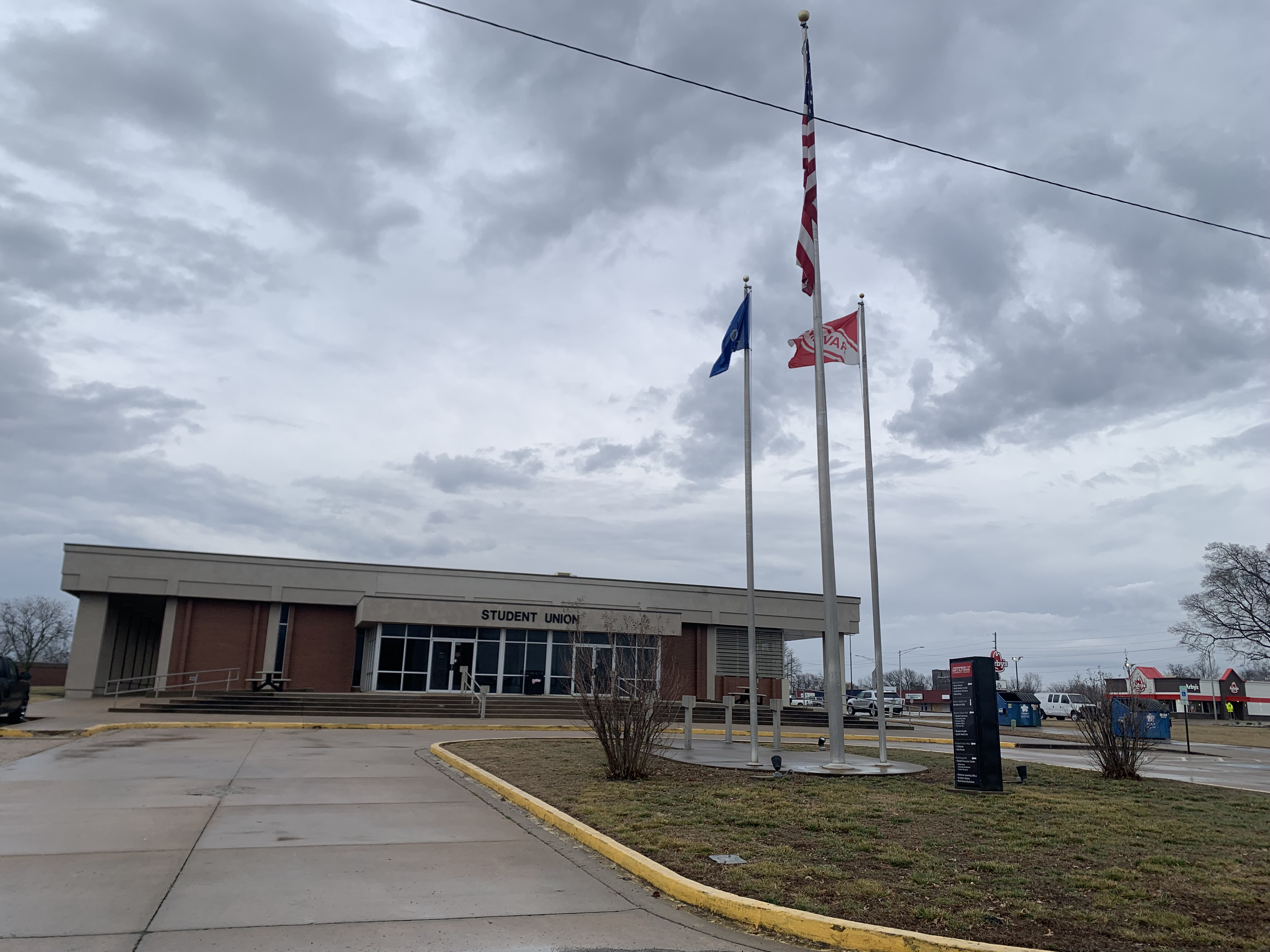
Coffeyville Community College Student Union

Coffeyville Community College was established in 1923, and was among the first such institutions to be chartered by the State of Kansas. It was founded at the request of the voters of the Coffeyville school district to provide two years of college for students who, at that time, had graduated from Coffeyville High School.

From the beginning, the college has been advised by the University of Kansas. Together, they developed the various courses and departments at the college. Since that time, the college has maintained a close relationship with the University of Kansas, and all other Kansas Regents Institutions, to provide for effective operation and transfer of credits. In 1965, the college became a member of the State System of Public Junior Colleges and the name officially became Coffeyville Community Junior College. Soon after, the voters of the southern one-half of Montgomery County voted to expand the college district to include the entire southern half of the county instead of just the City of Coffeyville. The first Board of Trustees was elected in 1967. In 1980, the college name was officially changed to Coffeyville Community College by an act of the State Legislature. In 2001, the Southeast Kansas Area Vocational Technical School merged with Coffeyville Community College.

== Athletics ==
Coffeyville Community College has sent forty-eight players to the NFL over the years.

== Notable alumni ==
- Larry Asante, professional football player
- Micky Axton, Women Airforce Service Pilot during World War II and CCC chemistry instructor
- Akin Ayodele, professional football player
- Gary Busey, actor
- James Carpenter, professional football player
- Duron Carter, professional football player
- Buster Douglas, professional boxer
- Maurice "Lil Mo" Douglass, professional football player
- Reggie Evans, professional basketball player
- Andre De Grasse, Olympic track athlete
- Mel Gray, professional football player
- Tim Jackson, professional football player
- Brandon Jacobs, professional football player
- Ryan Lilja, professional football player
- Pete Mills, professional football player
- Reggie Nelson, professional football player
- Quinton Patton, professional football player
- Mike Rozier, professional football player
- Henry Schichtle, professional football player
- Kurt Schottenheimer, professional football coach
- Devin Smith, professional basketball player
- Paul Soliai, professional football player
- Ron Springs, professional football player
- Siran Stacy, professional football player
- Devin Thomas, professional football player
- Willie Townes, professional football player
- Keith Traylor, professional football player
- Cedrick Wilson Jr., professional football player
- Jeff Wright, professional football player
