= Bethel African Methodist Episcopal Church (Coffeyville, Kansas) =

Historic church in Kansas, United States

- U.S. National Register of Historic Places
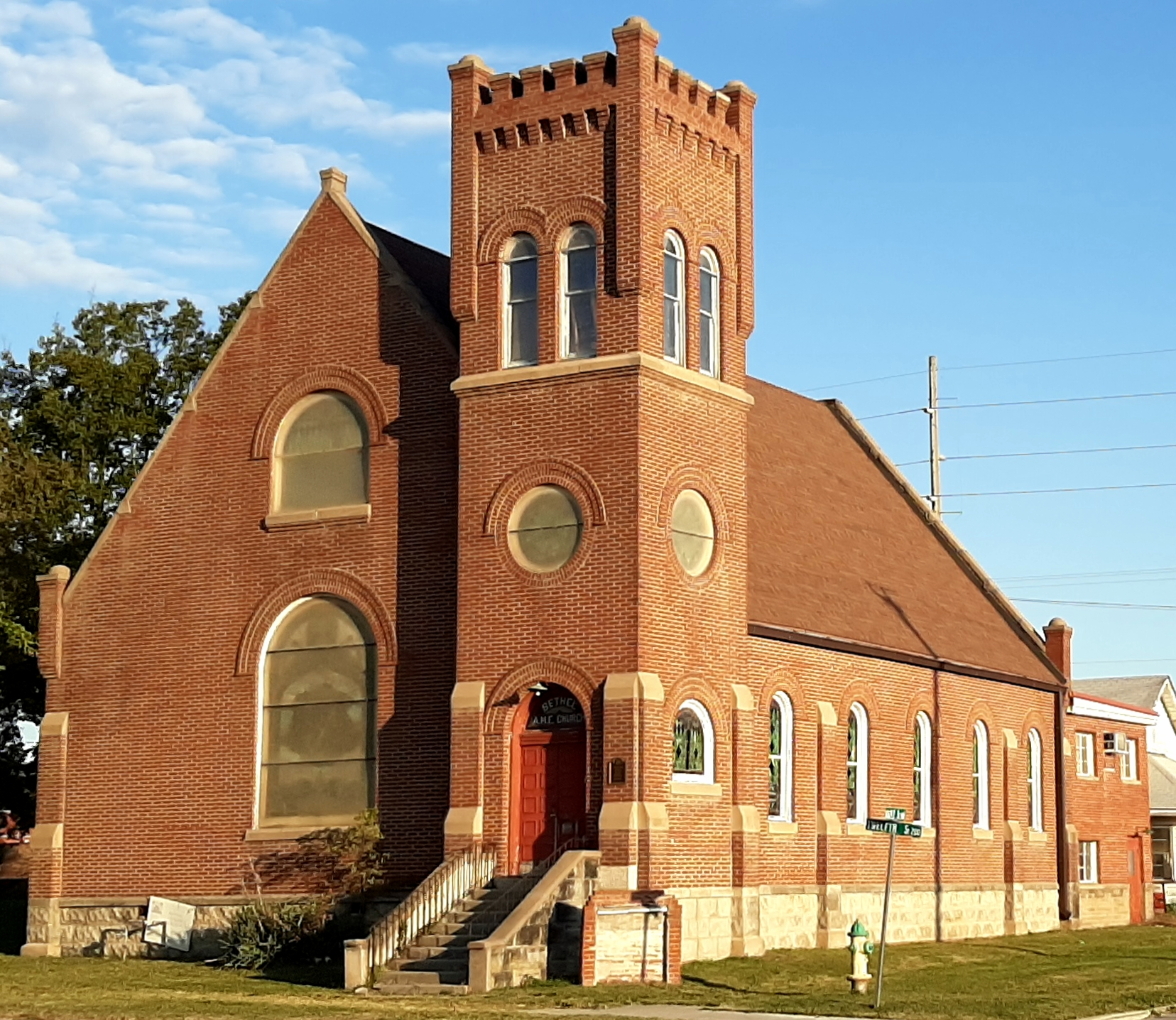

- Location within Kansas Location within the United States
- Location: 202 W. 12th St. Coffeyville, Kansas
- Coordinates: 37°1′56″N 95°37′2″W
- Area: less than one acre
- Built: 1907
- Architect: John A. Simon
- Architectural style: Romanesque, Late Gothic Revival
- NRHP reference No.: 95000943
- Added to NRHP: July 28, 1995

Bethel African Methodist Episcopal Church is a historic African Methodist Episcopal church at 202 W. 12th Street in Coffeyville, Kansas, in the original black neighborhood of Coffeyville. It was built in 1907 and added to the National Register of Historic Places in 1995.

It is a one-story, brick church with elements of Romanesque and Gothic Revival style, on a rusticated limestone foundation.

It was built to replace the congregation's first church, a frame structure from 1882, which the congregation had outgrown.

== See also ==
- St. John African Methodist Episcopal Church (Topeka, Kansas): another AME church in Kansas
