= Micky Axton =

American aviator

Mildred Axton
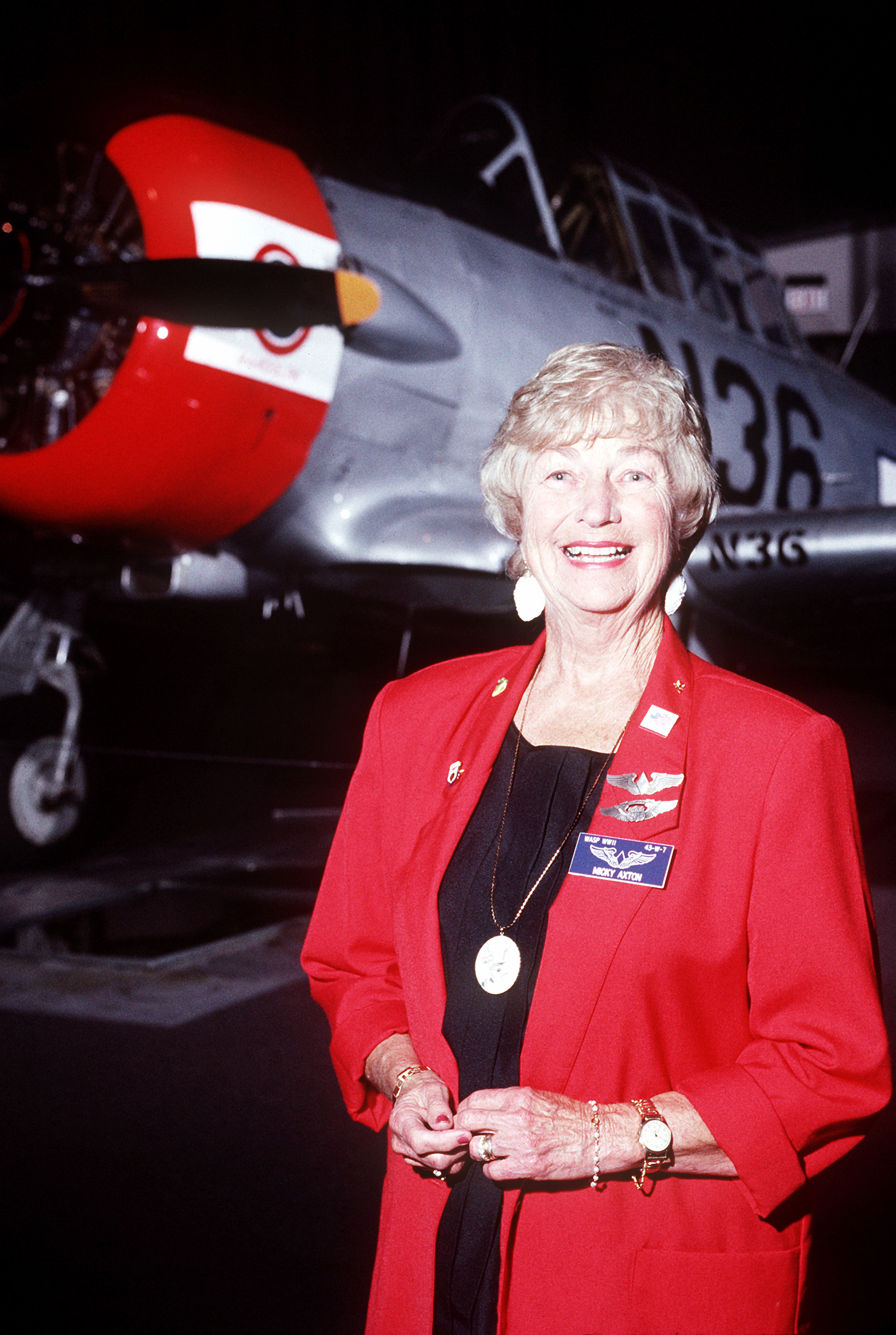
- Micky Axton, 1993.
- Born: January 9, 1919; Coffeyville, Kansas, U.S.
- Died: February 6, 2010 (aged 91); Eden Prairie, Minnesota, U.S.
- Military career
- Allegiance: United States of America
- Branch: United States Army Air Forces
- Nickname: Micky
- Unit: Women Airforce Service Pilots
- Awards: World War II Victory Medal

Micky Axton (January 9, 1919 – February 6, 2010) was an American aviator who was a test pilot during World War II. Axton was "one of the first three Women Airforce Service Pilots to be trained as a test pilot" and was the first woman to fly a B-29.

== Early life ==
Mildred Darlene Tuttle was born in Coffeyville, Kansas in 1919 to Beatrice Fletcher Tuttle and Ralph Tuttle.

=== Interest in aviation ===
Her first airplane ride, when she was a child, was in a Curtiss Jenny owned by a neighbor who was part of the Inman Brothers Barnstorming Flying Circus.

Tuttle graduated from Field Kindley High School in 1936, then enrolled in Coffeyville Community College and studied math and chemistry until 1938 when she transferred to Kansas State University. She graduated in 1940 with a teaching certificate and taught chemistry at Coffeyville Community College.

She obtained her pilot's license in 1940 and attended the Civilian Pilot Training program at Coffeyville Community College in Kansas as the only woman in the class.

=== Family influence ===
Her great-grandmother was her first passenger after she earned her pilots license.

Her brother, Ralph "Tut" Tuttle, was a World War II fighter pilot who flew an estimated 250 missions that earned him two Distinguished Flying Crosses and a Silver Star.

== Marriage ==
Mildred Tuttle married David "Wayne" Axton on June 1, 1941, the couple settled in Wichita.

== Women Airforce Service Pilots ==
In 1943, Axton joined Women Airforce Service Pilots (WASP) 43-W-7 training class. After graduation she was assigned to Pecos Army Airfield Base in Texas.

== Boeing aircraft flight test engineer ==
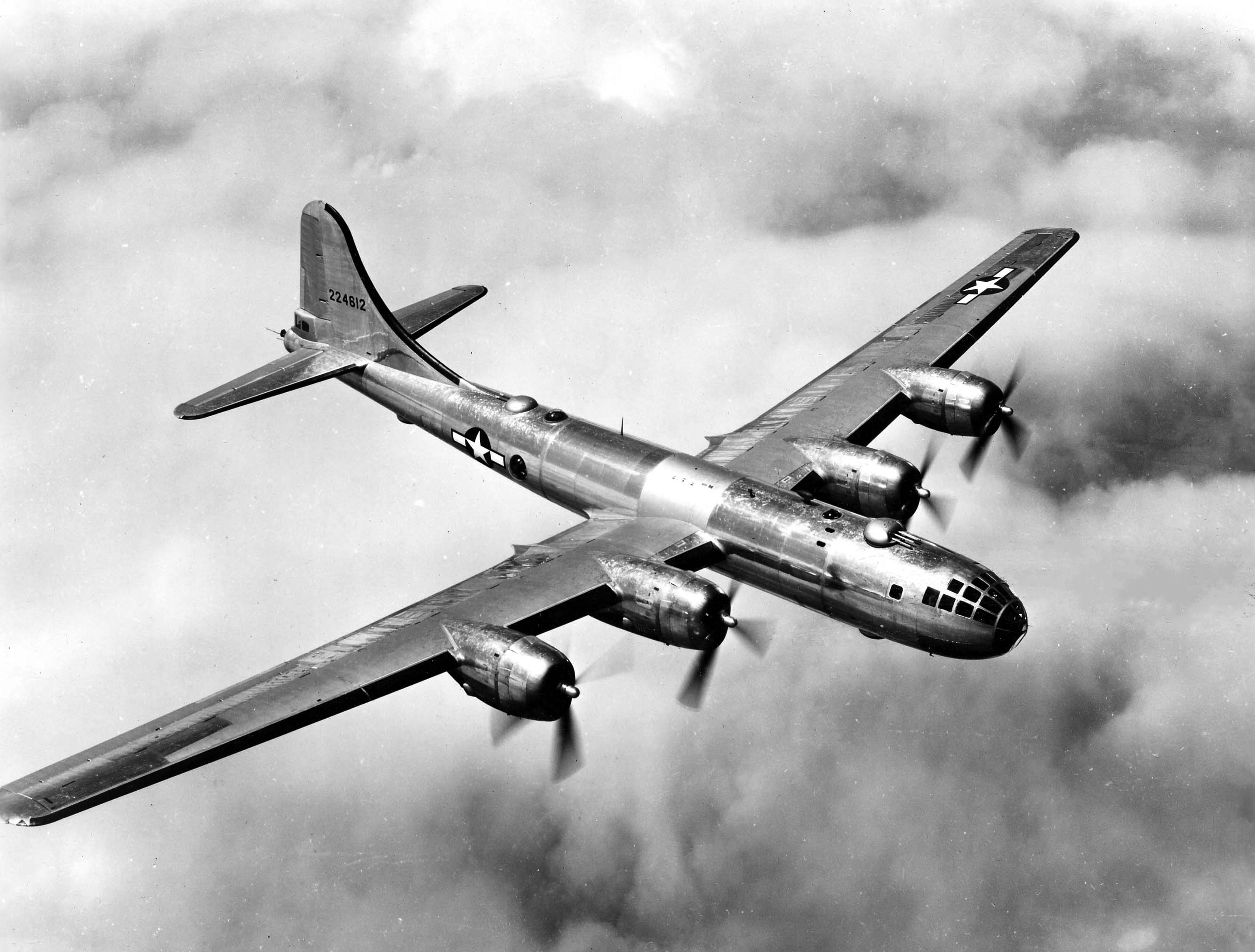
Mildred "Micky" Axton was the first woman to fly a B-29

Axton left the WASP program in April 1944 because her mother had taken ill. She applied for a job at the Boeing aircraft plant in Wichita, Kansas, and was hired to work as a flight test engineer.

In May 1944 Axton made an historic flight when she was the first woman to fly a Boeing B-29 Superfortress, a broad-shouldered, four-engine propeller-powered heavy bomber. The B-29 was one of the largest aircraft of its time. Axton recounts the flight, saying that the chief flight engineer "had me crawl through the tunnel and come up and I got to fly the B-29 for about 20, 25 minutes."

== Teaching career ==
Axton taught at East High School in Wichita, Kansas from 1958 to 1969.

== Later life and death ==
Axton was an active member of the Commemorative Air Force for forty years. Her husband died in 1998. She died in 2010, aged 91, in Eden Prairie, Minnesota, following a brief illness.

== Recognition and legacy ==
The Commemorative Air Force Jayhawk Wing in Wichita restored a Fairchild PT-19 and renamed it "Miss Micky" to honor Axton. At a ceremony on Victory in Europe Day in 2009 the state of Minnesota belatedly recognized the women in their state that served in World War II. In July 2009 United States President Barack Obama signed a bill bestowing the Congressional Gold Medal to members of the Women Airforce Service Pilots for the service they gave to their country during World War II. Axton was to receive the Congressional Gold Medal on March 10, 2010.
