= Henry Schichtle =

American gridiron football player (born 1941)

No. 10
- Position: Quarterback

Personal information
- Born: October 31, 1941 (age 85); Tulsa, Oklahoma, U.S.
- Listed height: 6 ft 2 in (1.88 m)
- Listed weight: 190 lb (86 kg)

Career information
- High school: Field Kindley (Coffeyville, Kansas)
- College: Wichita State
- NFL draft: 1964: 6th round, 81st overall pick

Career history
- New York Giants (1964–1965); Atlanta Falcons (1966)*; San Francisco 49ers (1966)*; Waterbury Orbits (1966); BC Lions (1967)
- * Offseason or practice squad member only
- Stats at Pro Football Reference

Henry Ernest Schichtle (born October 13, 1941) is an American former professional football quarterback who played for the New York Giants of the National Football League (NFL) and the BC Lions of the Canadian Football League (CFL). He was selected by the Giants in the sixth round of the 1964 NFL draft. He played college football at Coffeyville Community College and Wichita State University.

== Early life ==
Schichtle played football, basketball, baseball and golf at Field Kindley High School in Coffeyville, Kansas and graduated with honors from the school.

== College career ==
Schichtle attended the University of Hawaii for one semester.

Schichtle transferred to play for the Coffeyville Red Ravens of Coffeyville Community College for two seasons under head coach Dean Pryor and was enrolled at the school for three academic semesters. He completed over 56% of his passes for over 1,300 yards in 1961 while the Red Ravens finished the year with a 9–2 record and were ranked in the top ten of all junior college teams in the country. The highlight of the team's year was a season-ending 33-6 win over the Wichita State Shockers' freshmen team. Schichtle completed 17 of 29 pass attempts for 272 yards against the Shockers. He was also a Phi Delta Theta member at Coffeyville. He was inducted into the Lettermen's Hall of Fame at Coffeyville Community College in 2003.

Schichtle was later recruited by the Wichita State Shockers of Wichita State University, and played for the team from 1962 to 1963. His former head coach Dean Pryor also joined the Shockers as an assistant coach. Schichtle set several season and career records for the Shockers in 1962. He was named co-captain and the Most Valuable Player of the 1963 team. He also earned All-MVC honors and was named an Honorable Mention All-American in 1963. Schichtle was also a Cum Laude graduate and an Academic All-American at Wichita State. He was inducted into the Wichita State University Athletic Hall of Fame in 1981.

== Professional career ==
Schichtle was selected in the sixth round by the New York Giants with the 81st pick in the 1964 NFL draft and played in one game for the team during the 1964 season. He was released by the Giants on August 31, 1965.

Schichtle signed with the Atlanta Falcons in February 1966 and was released by the team on July 7, 1966.

Schichtle was later signed by the San Francisco 49ers. He was released by the 49ers on August 1, 1966. An excerpt of his NFL career is used as an example for the phrase "cup of coffee" in The Dickson Baseball Dictionary.

Schichtle played for the Waterbury Orbits of the Atlantic Coast Football League in 1966.

Schichtle played in seven games, starting one, for the BC Lions during the 1967 season.
