= Coffeyville Carnegie Public Library Building =

- U.S. National Register of Historic Places
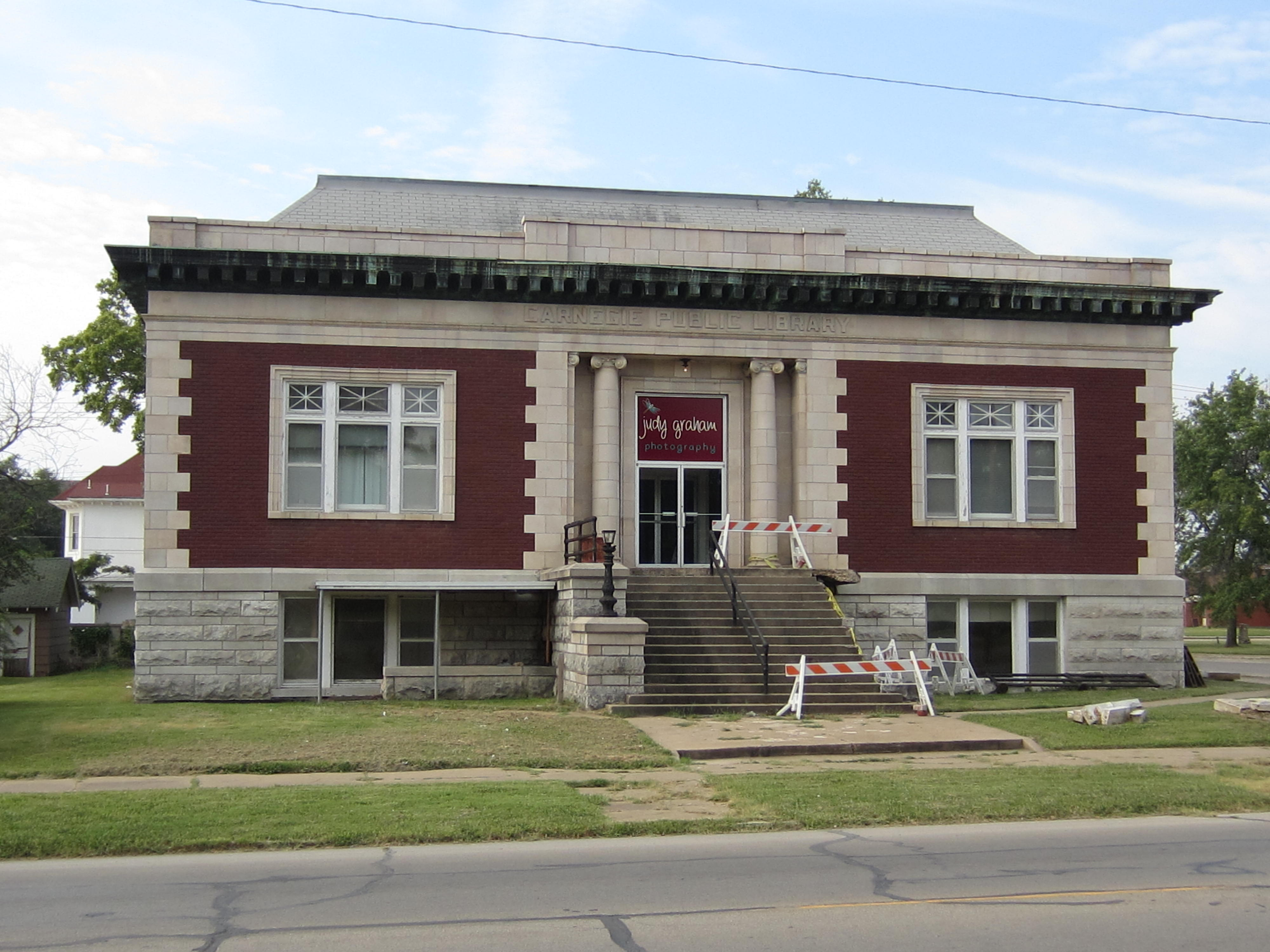
- The Coffeyville Carnegie Public Library Building in 2013

- Location within Kansas Location within the United States
- Location: 415 W. Eighth, Coffeyville, Kansas
- Coordinates: 37°02′09″N 95°37′23″W
- Area: Less than one acre
- Built: 1912
- Built by: Davis, Charles S.
- Architects: Anderson, A.C.
- Architectural style: Classical Revival
- MPS: Carnegie Libraries of Kansas TR
- NRHP reference No.: 87000962
- Added to NRHP: June 25, 1987

The Coffeyville Carnegie Public Library Building, located at 415 W. Eighth in Coffeyville, Kansas, is a Carnegie library which was built in 1912. It was listed on the National Register of Historic Places in 1987.

A library association organized in 1906 obtained a $25,000 Carnegie library grant in 1911. The library was deemed notable "for its historical association with the Carnegie Corporation Library Building Program and for its architectural significance as a new building type."

It is Classical Revival in style.

It has also been known as the Coffeyville Community College Adult Education Center.
