= St. John's African Methodist Episcopal Church (Norfolk, Virginia) =

Historic church in Virginia, US

- U.S. National Register of Historic Places
- Virginia Landmarks Register
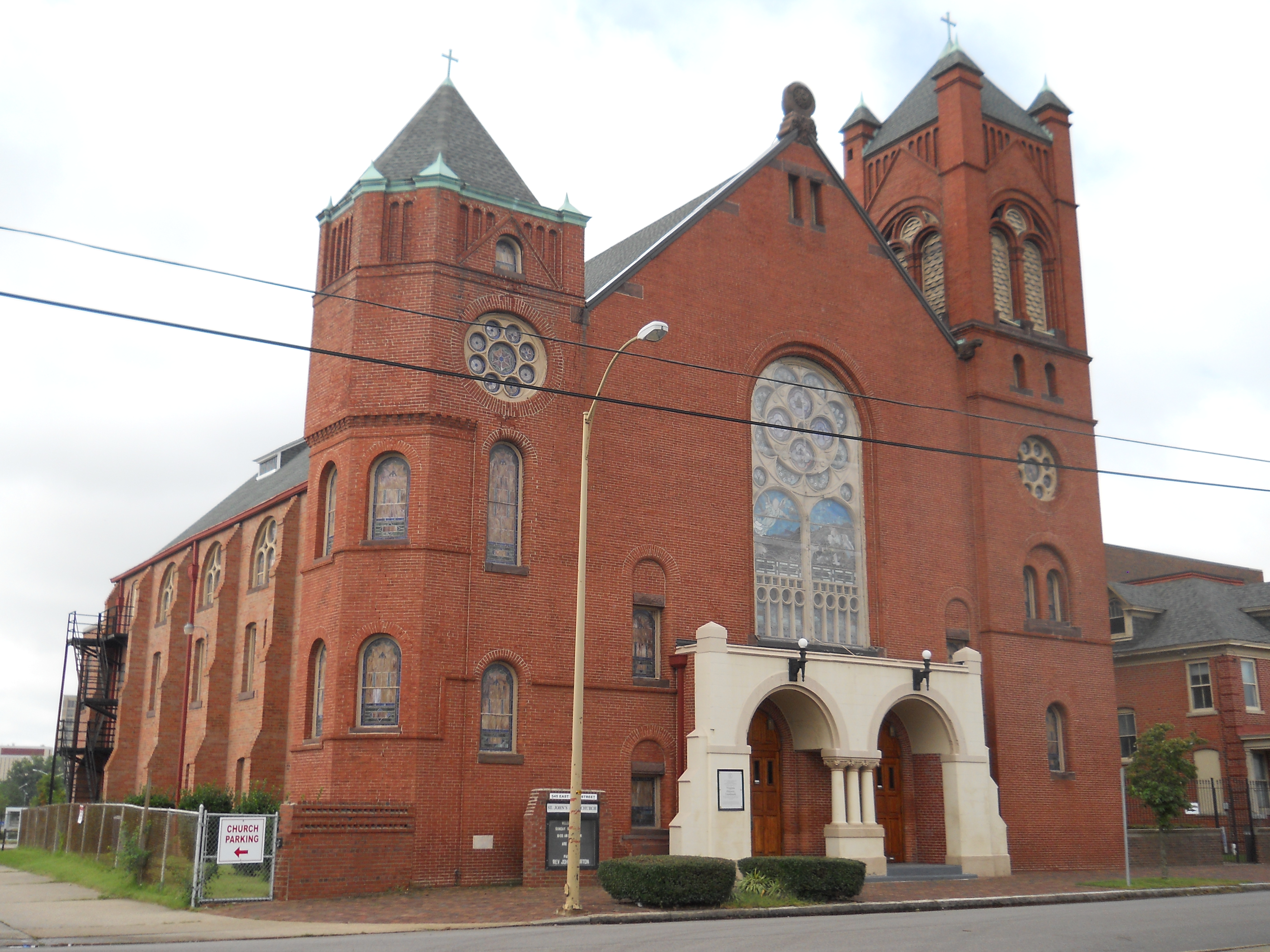
- St. John's African Methodist Episcopal Church, September 2013

- Location within Virginia Location within the United States
- Location: 539-545 E. Bute St., Norfolk, Virginia
- Coordinates: 36°51′6″N 76°16′58″W
- Area: 1 acre (0.40 ha)
- Built: 1888
- Architect: Cassell, Charles M.
- Architectural style: Romanesque, Richardsonian Romanesque
- NRHP reference No.: 86003441
- VLR No.: 122-0211

Significant dates
- Added to NRHP: December 4, 1986
- Designated VLR: October 14, 1986

St. John's AME Church is a historic congregation of the African Methodist Episcopal Church in Norfolk, Virginia, United States. Founded in 1840, it was the first African American Episcopal Church in Virginia. It moved to its present location on East Bute Street in what is now Downtown Norfolk in 1848.

The historic church building was built in 1888, a red brick structure in the Richardsonian Romanesque style with a large, heavy and steeply pitched slate roof and two flanking towers. The building features a centered stone entrance portico, containing the main entrance to the church. The portico is built of light grey freestone in a style reminiscent of the ambulatory of a Romanesque abbey and consists of two large openings headed by semi-circular arches. The building houses a large sanctuary and horseshoe-shaped balcony with a seating capacity of 1,500 people. Also on the property is the contributing parsonage; a 2½-story, four-bay, brick dwelling in a simplified Second French Empire style. It was listed on the National Register of Historic Places in 1986.
