= St. John African Methodist Episcopal Church (Topeka, Kansas) =

Historic church in Kansas, United States

- U.S. National Register of Historic Places
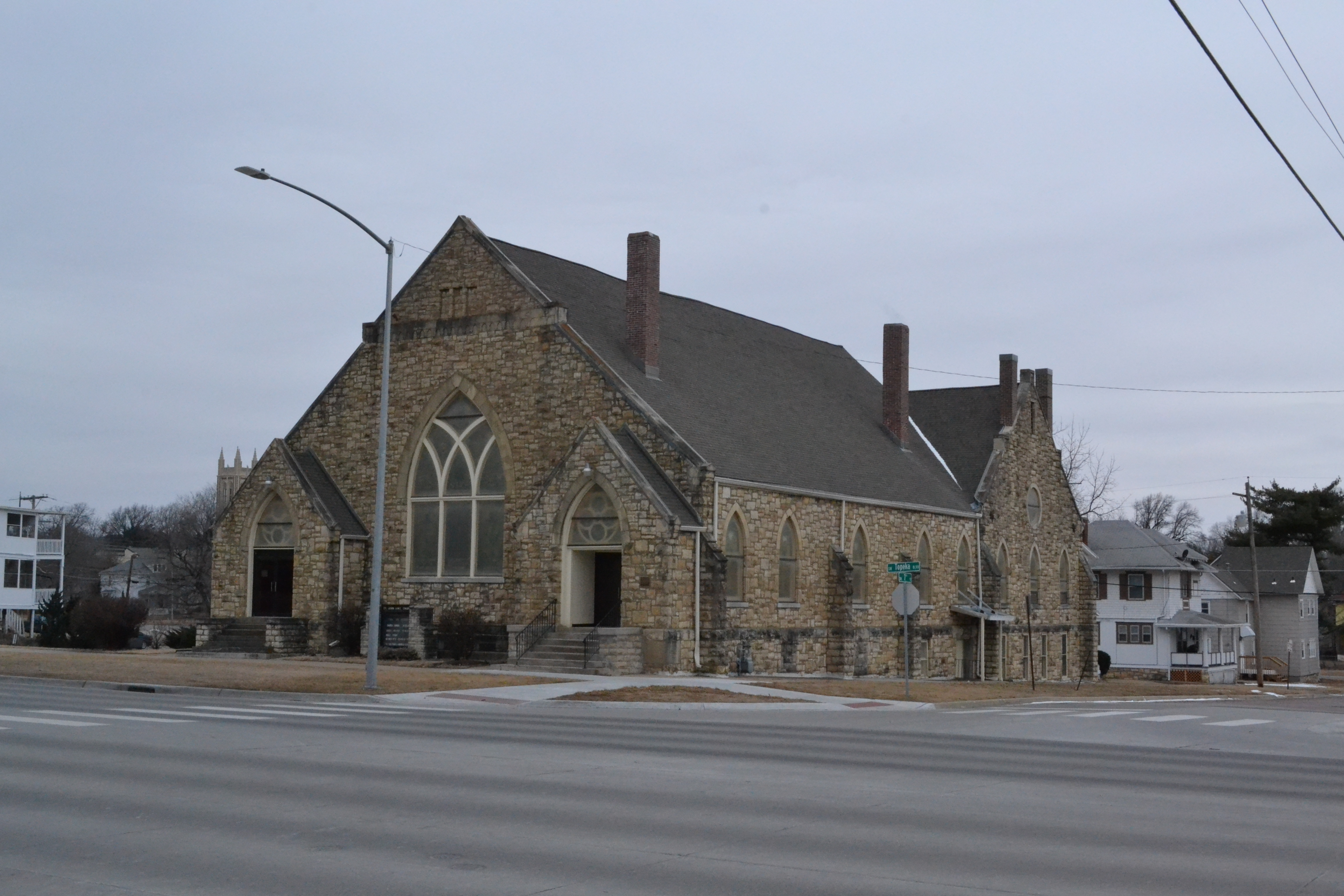
- St. John African Methodist Episcopal Church in 2018

- Location within Kansas Location within the United States
- Location: 701 SW Topeka Blvd., Topeka, Kansas
- Coordinates: 39°3′6″N 95°40′47″W
- Area: Less than one acre
- Built: 1908
- Architects: Wood, Louis M.H.; Hawkins, S.P.
- Architectural style: Late Gothic Revival
- NRHP reference No.: 08000987
- Added to NRHP: October 16, 2008

The St. John African Methodist Episcopal Church in Topeka, Kansas is a historic church at 701 SW Topeka Boulevard. It was built in 1908 to 1926 and listed on the National Register of Historic Places in 2008.

It is built of square-cut native limestone. Stages of construction were completed in 1918, 1920, and 1926.

== See also ==
- Bethel African Methodist Episcopal Church (Coffeyville, Kansas): another AME church in Kansas
