= Nowata Municipal Airport =

Airport in Oklahoma, United States

- IATA: none; ICAO: none; FAA LID: H66

Summary
- Airport type: Public
- Owner: City of Nowata
- Serves: Nowata, Oklahoma
- Elevation AMSL: 679 ft (207 m)
- Coordinates: 36°43′15″N 095°37′31″W

Map
- Location of airport in Oklahoma H66 (the United States)

Runways
Direction	Length		Surface
Direction	ft	m	Surface
17/35	2,500	762	Asphalt
5/23	2,440	744	Turf (closed)

Statistics (2011)
- Aircraft operations: 200
- Based aircraft: 7
- Source: Federal Aviation Administration

Nowata Municipal Airport (FAA LID: H66) is a city-owned, public-use airport located two nautical miles (4 km) northeast of the central business district of Nowata, a city in Nowata County, Oklahoma, United States. It was included in the National Plan of Integrated Airport Systems for 2007–2011, which categorized it as a general aviation facility.

== Facilities and aircraft ==
Nowata Municipal Airport covers an area of 100 acres (40 ha) at an elevation of 679 feet (207 m) above mean sea level. It has one asphalt paved runway designated 17/35 which measures 2,500 by 45 feet (762 x 14 m). There is also a closed turf runway designated 5/23 which is 2,440 by 45 feet (744 x 14 m).

For the 12-month period ending May 11, 2011, the airport had 200 general aviation aircraft operations, an average of 16 per month. At that time there were seven aircraft based at this airport, all single-engine.

== See also ==
- List of airports in Oklahoma
