= South Coffeyville, Oklahoma =

- Town
- Nickname: South Town
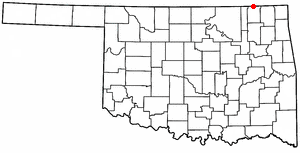
- Location of South Coffeyville, Oklahoma
- Coordinates: 36°59′30″N 95°37′20″W
- Country: United States
- State: Oklahoma
- County: Nowata

Government
  - Type: Council

Area
  - Total: 0.74 sq mi (1.91 km^{2})
  - Land: 0.74 sq mi (1.91 km^{2})
  - Water: 0 sq mi (0.00 km^{2})
- Elevation: 722 ft (220 m)

Population (2020)
  - Total: 683
  - Density: 925.7/sq mi (357.42/km^{2})
- Time zone: UTC-6 (Central (CST))
  - Summer (DST): UTC-5 (CDT)
- ZIP code: 74072
- Area codes: 539/918
- FIPS code: 40-68600
- GNIS feature ID: 2413306
- Website: southcoffeyvilleok.gov

South Coffeyville is a town in Nowata County, Oklahoma, United States. As of the 2020 census, South Coffeyville had a population of 683. The city of Coffeyville, Kansas is located approximately one mile north of the city, existing as a separate political entity.

== History ==
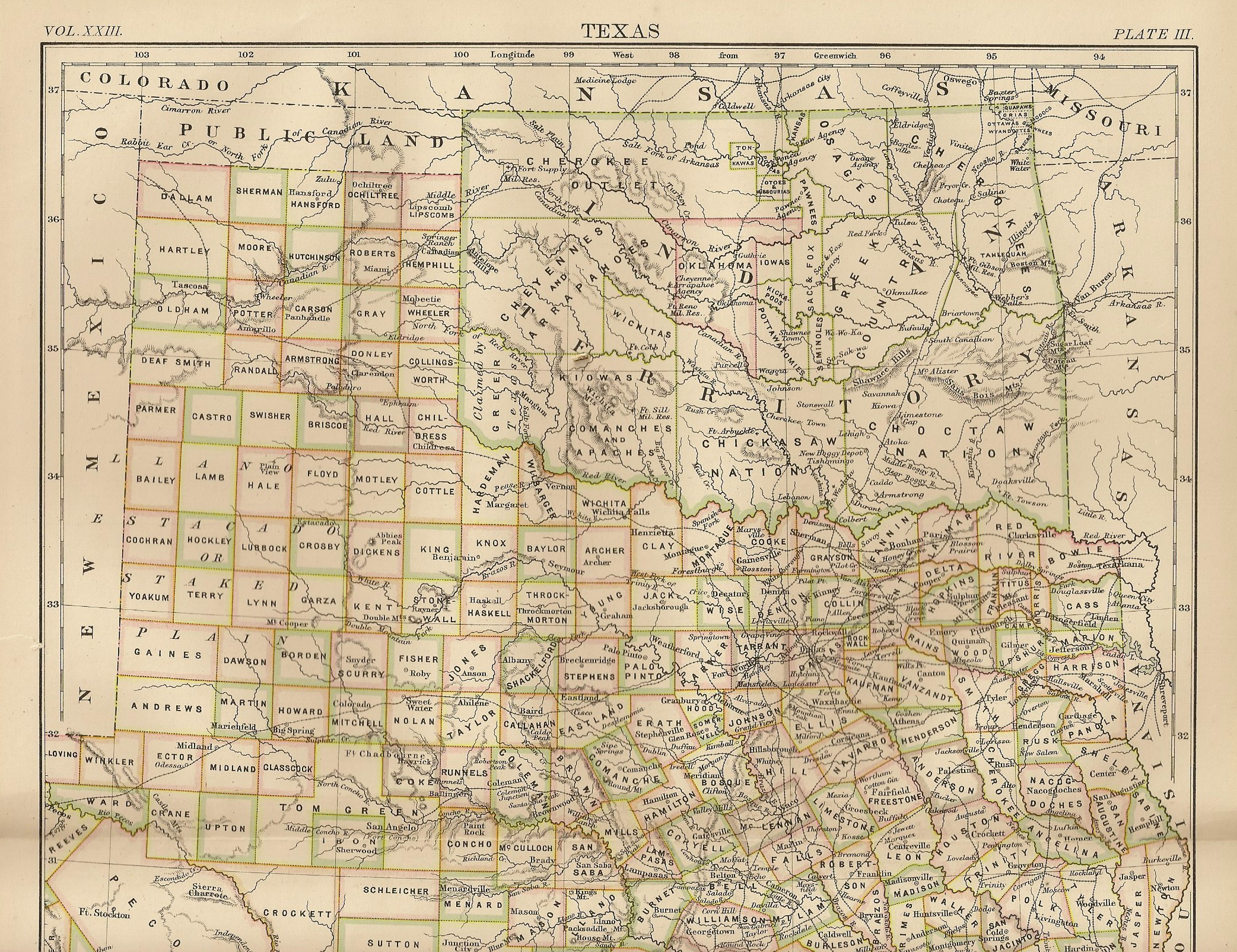
Map of Indian Territory from 1889 Encyclopædia Britannica 9th edition

For millennia, the land now known as Oklahoma was inhabited by Native Americans. In the 17th century, white trappers first visiting the area found it occupied mostly by the Osage and Quawpaw tribes. In 1803, modern Oklahoma was secured by the United States as part of the Louisiana Purchase. In 1819, the Arkansas Territory was organized, then was split in 1824 and 1828. An 1828 treaty with the Cherokee Nation assigned the area of Nowata County to the Cherokees, who included it in 1856 in their newly created Cooweescoowee District. The Cherokees and the Delaware signed a treaty in 1867. In 1890, the area became part of the Oklahoma Territory. In 1907, Oklahoma became the 46th U.S. state and Nowata County was founded.

In 1888, the first settlement in the area was established as Stevens, a railhead tent and shack village, built just southwest of present South Coffeyville. It was named after a Missouri, Kansas and Texas Railway builder, Stevens could be found on railroad maps until about 1902 but was eventually abandoned.

In 1906, a settlement called Polson was built approximately one mile northeast near the Missouri, Kansas and Texas Railway and Missouri Pacific Railways. Now part of the Union Pacific railway, the Missouri Pacific Railway had reached the present South Coffeyville townsite in 1889. The settlement was named after Martin and Earl Polson, early settlers, that designation was also short lived.

On March 18, 1909, a post office was established and the settlement was renamed to Etchen, in honor of a local citizen named John P. Etchen.

On April 29, 1909, the settlement was renamed a final time to the current South Coffeyville and the South Coffeyville Times newspaper began publication soon after. In August 1909, residents voted for incorporation. The name of South Coffeyville was derived from nearby city of Coffeyville, Kansas, which was named after James A. Coffey.

== Geography ==
South Coffeyville is located on US Route 169 just south of the Oklahoma-Kansas state line. The city of Coffeyville, Kansas is 2.5 miles to the north. Onion Creek flows past the north side of the community to its confluence with the Verdigris River 1.5 miles east.

According to the United States Census Bureau, the town has a total area of 0.6 square mile (1.6 km^{2}), all land.

== Demographics ==
Historical population
Census	Pop.	Note	%±
1910	196		—
1920	179		−8.7%
1930	271		51.4%
1940	364		34.3%
1950	527		44.8%
1960	622		18.0%
1970	646		3.9%
1980	873		35.1%
1990	791		−9.4%
2000	300		−62.1%
2010	785		161.7%
2020	683		−13.0%
U.S. Decennial Census

=== 2020 census ===
As of the 2020 census, South Coffeyville had a population of 683. The median age was 40.9 years. 22.8% of residents were under the age of 18 and 20.1% of residents were 65 years of age or older. For every 100 females there were 92.4 males, and for every 100 females age 18 and over there were 95.2 males age 18 and over.

97.7% of residents lived in urban areas, while 2.3% lived in rural areas.

There were 287 households in South Coffeyville, of which 36.6% had children under the age of 18 living in them. Of all households, 48.4% were married-couple households, 19.9% were households with a male householder and no spouse or partner present, and 21.3% were households with a female householder and no spouse or partner present. About 27.2% of all households were made up of individuals and 11.8% had someone living alone who was 65 years of age or older.

There were 321 housing units, of which 10.6% were vacant. The homeowner vacancy rate was 1.4% and the rental vacancy rate was 14.1%.

Racial composition as of the 2020 census
Race	Number	Percent
White	441	64.6%
Black or African American	2	0.3%
American Indian and Alaska Native	109	16.0%
Asian	1	0.1%
Native Hawaiian and Other Pacific Islander	1	0.1%
Some other race	1	0.1%
Two or more races	128	18.7%
Hispanic or Latino (of any race)	26	3.8%

=== 2000 census ===
As of the 2000 census, there were 790 people, 329 households, and 228 families residing in the town. The population density was 1,284.7 inhabitants per square mile (496.0/km^{2}). There were 365 housing units at an average density of 593.6 per square mile (229.2/km^{2}). The racial makeup of the town was 84.81% White, 0.13% African American, 9.62% Native American, 0.25% Asian, and 5.19% from two or more races. Hispanic or Latino of any race were 1.90% of the population.

Of all households, 33.4% had children under the age of 18 living with them, 54.7% were married couples living together, 10.9% had a female householder with no husband present, and 30.4% were non-families. 28.6% of all households were made up of individuals, and 15.5% had someone living alone who was 65 years of age or older. The average household size was 2.40 and the average family size was 2.90.

In the town, the population was spread out, with 26.6% under the age of 18, 7.0% from 18 to 24, 27.7% from 25 to 44, 21.5% from 45 to 64, and 17.2% who were 65 years of age or older. The median age was 37 years. For every 100 females, there were 85.4 males. For every 100 females age 18 and over, there were 86.5 males.

The median income for a household in the town was $29,688, and the median income for a family was $37,109. Males had a median income of $29,107 versus $20,179 for females. The per capita income for the town was $16,560. About 8.7% of families and 12.5% of the population were below the poverty line, including 19.4% of those under age 18 and 13.5% of those age 65 or over.

== Transportation ==
South Coffeyville is served by US Route 169.

Intercity bus service is available from Jefferson Lines in Coffeyville, Kansas.

Coffeyville Municipal Airport (KCFV; FAA ID: CFV) is about 9 miles north-northeast, and has two runways, the longest 5868’ x 100’.

Commercial air transportation is available out of Tulsa International Airport, about 63 miles south.

== Notable people ==
- Gail Kubik, composer, motion picture scorist, violinist, and teacher.

== See also ==
- National Register of Historic Places listings in Nowata County, Oklahoma
