= Nowata, Oklahoma =

Nowata, Oklahoma Unami: Nuwatu, Nuwi ta Cherokee: ᎠᎹᏗᎧᏂᎬᎬ, romanized: Amadikanigvgv
- City
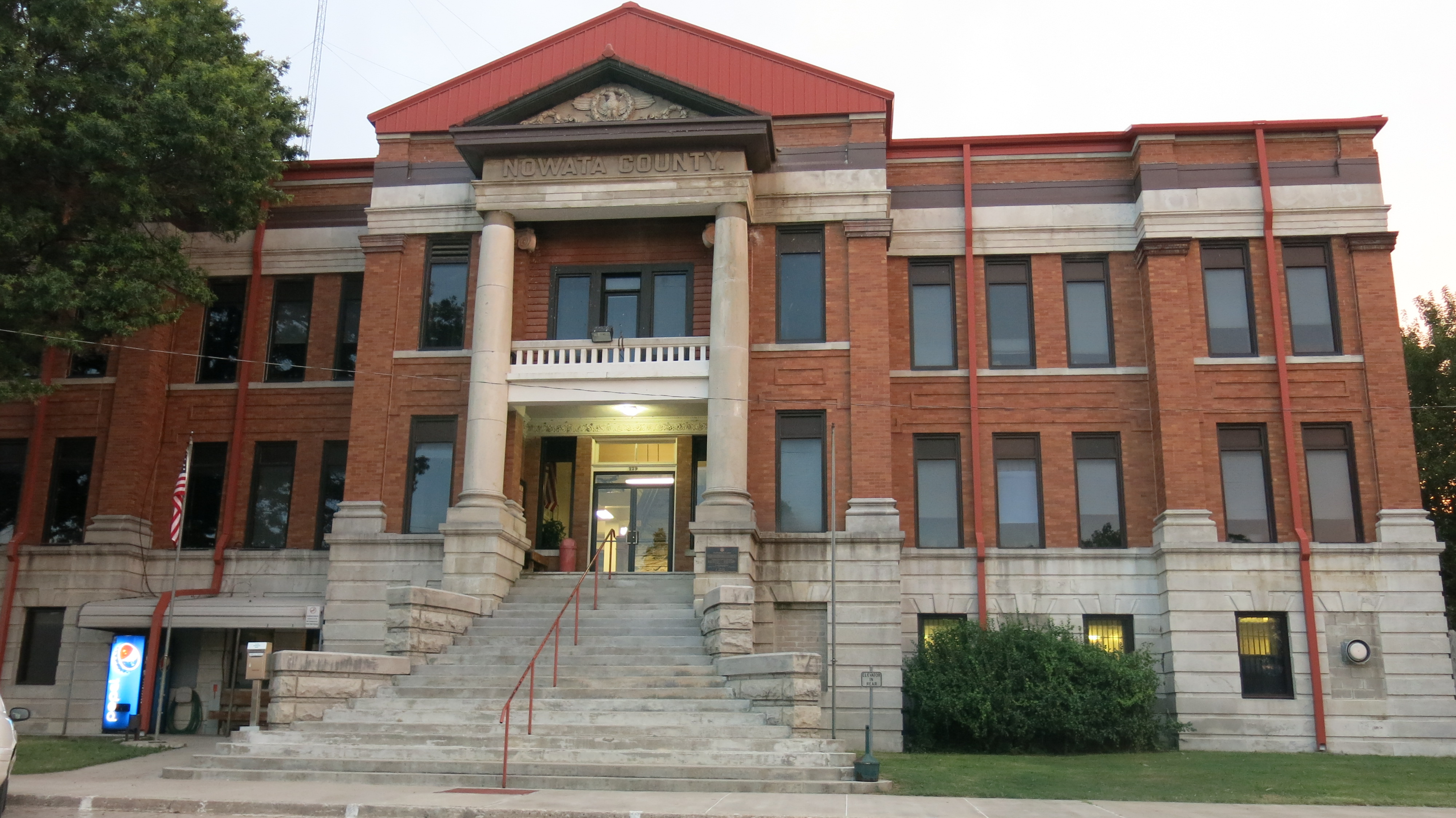
- Nowata County Courthouse (2016)

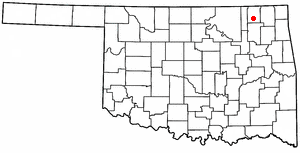
- Location of Nowata within Oklahoma
- Coordinates: 36°41′55″N 95°38′14″W
- Country: United States
- State: Oklahoma
- County: Nowata

Area
  - Total: 3.41 sq mi (8.83 km^{2})
  - Land: 3.41 sq mi (8.82 km^{2})
  - Water: 0.0039 sq mi (0.01 km^{2})
- Elevation: 696 ft (212 m)

Population (2020)
  - Total: 3,517
  - Density: 1,033.0/sq mi (398.83/km^{2})
- Time zone: UTC-6 (Central (CST))
  - Summer (DST): UTC-5 (CDT)
- ZIP Code: 74048
- Area codes: 539/918
- FIPS code: 40-52900
- GNIS ID: 2411285
- Website: City website

Nowata (Unami: Nuwatu, Nuwi ta)) is a city in and the county seat of Nowata County, Oklahoma, United States. As of the 2020 census, Nowata had a population of 3,517. The area where it was established was then part of the Cherokee Nation in Indian Territory.

== History ==
The first community established at this site was named Metz, named for its first postmaster, Fred Metzner. The name was changed even before the railroad was built in 1889. Nowata served as a train stop for Native Americans from the East being forced to resettle by the United States government. Some controversy exists about the meaning of the town name. Lenape tribesmen who passed through named it "nuwita," meaning "friendly" or "welcome." In the Cherokee language, the town is called ᎠᎹᏗᎧᏂᎬᎬ Amadikanigvgv (IPA: [amadikanigə̃gə̃]), which means, "water is all gone," translating what it sounded like the word meant: No Water.

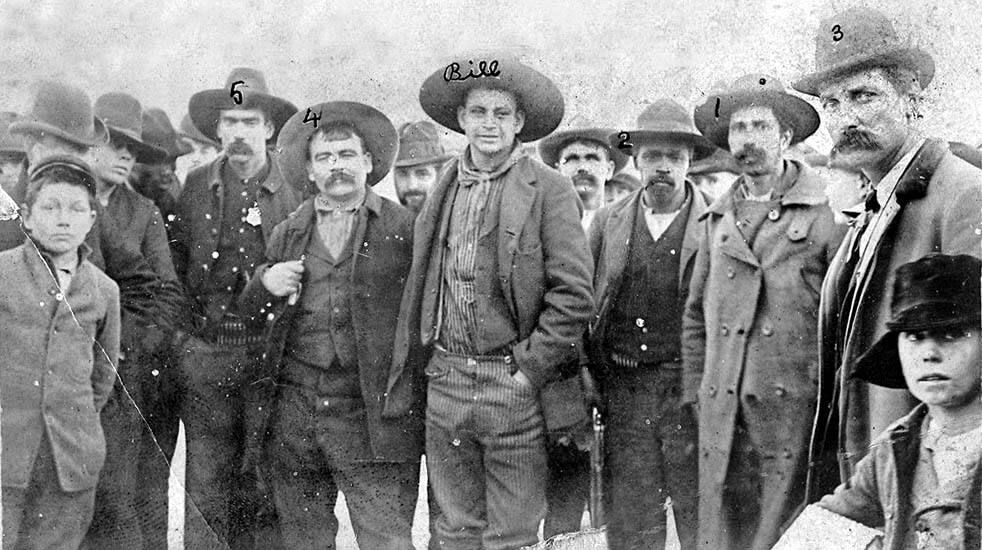
Cherokee Bill Goldsby posing with his captors during a stop by train to Nowata, 1895. Left to right are #5)Zeke Crittenden; #4)Dick Crittenden;Cherokee Bill; #2)Clint Scales, #1) Ike Rogers; #3) Deputy Marshall Bill Smith.

In 1889, the Kansas and Arkansas Valley Railway (later part of the Missouri Pacific Railway) built a line through Nowata. A post office was established in the town on November 8, 1889. Nowata was incorporated April 17, 1899. By 1900, Nowata had 498 residents.

Oil and gas were discovered nearby in 1904, stimulating the Nowata economy. The find established Nowata as "...a region (having) a reputation for being the world's largest shallow oil field." Some wells in this field have continued to produce into the twenty-first century.

A Federal court was established in 1904, and met on the third floor of the new building owned by the First National Bank of Nowata. The building housing the court burned down in 1909, destroying all records and forcing the court to move temporarily to another building. When Oklahoma became a state on November 16, 1907, Nowata County was created and named for the city, which was designated as the county seat. By that time, the city population had climbed to 2,233. A permanent Nowata County Courthouse was completed in 1912, and remains in use at present. It is the only local property listed on the National Record of Historic Places.

On September 29, 1916, two men, accused of killing a deputy sheriff, were taken from the Nowata jail by a mob and lynched in front of the courthouse.

Nowata's peak population was 4,435 in 1920. It became the southern terminus of the Union Electric Railway, which continued to serve the city until 1948. Newspapers included the Nowata Herald and the Nowata Advertiser. The town had 850 telephones by 1930, when the census showed its first population decline, to nearly the 1910 level.

== Geography ==
Nowata is 51 miles (82 km) north of Tulsa and 21 miles (34 km) south of the Kansas state line. According to the United States Census Bureau, the city has a total area of 3.1 square miles (8.0 km^{2}), all land. The Verdigris River runs along the eastern border of town.

=== Climate ===
Nowata is the home of the coldest temperature ever recorded in the state of Oklahoma. A thermometer at an Oklahoma Mesonet site in Nowata recorded a low temperature of −31 °F (−35 °C) on the morning of February 10, 2011. A week later, the high temperature was 79 °F (26 °C), which is 110 °F (61 °C) higher. The city falls within USDA plant hardiness zone 7a (0 to 5 °F; −18 to −15 °C).

== Demographics ==
Historical population
| Census | Pop. | Note | %± |
|---|---|---|---|
| 1900 | 498 | | — |
| 1910 | 3,672 | | 637.3% |
| 1920 | 4,435 | | 20.8% |
| 1930 | 3,531 | | −20.4% |
| 1940 | 3,904 | | 10.6% |
| 1950 | 3,965 | | 1.6% |
| 1960 | 4,163 | | 5.0% |
| 1970 | 3,679 | | −11.6% |
| 1980 | 4,270 | | 16.1% |
| 1990 | 3,896 | | −8.8% |
| 2000 | 3,971 | | 1.9% |
| 2010 | 3,731 | | −6.0% |
| 2020 | 3,517 | | −5.7% |
U.S. Decennial Census

=== 2020 census ===
As of the 2020 census, Nowata had a population of 3,517. The median age was 38.8 years. 25.2% of residents were under the age of 18 and 19.1% of residents were 65 years of age or older. For every 100 females there were 90.2 males, and for every 100 females age 18 and over there were 88.4 males age 18 and over.

0% of residents lived in urban areas, while 100.0% lived in rural areas.

There were 1,453 households in Nowata, of which 30.1% had children under the age of 18 living in them. Of all households, 36.7% were married-couple households, 21.3% were households with a male householder and no spouse or partner present, and 34.1% were households with a female householder and no spouse or partner present. About 36.4% of all households were made up of individuals and 17.1% had someone living alone who was 65 years of age or older.

There were 1,740 housing units, of which 16.5% were vacant. Among occupied housing units, 64.3% were owner-occupied and 35.7% were renter-occupied. The homeowner vacancy rate was 2.6% and the rental vacancy rate was 13.1%.

Racial composition as of the 2020 census
| Race | Percent |
|---|---|
| White | 58.1% |
| Black or African American | 1.8% |
| American Indian and Alaska Native | 19.9% |
| Asian | 0.2% |
| Native Hawaiian and Other Pacific Islander | 0.1% |
| Some other race | 0.7% |
| Two or more races | 19.3% |
| Hispanic or Latino (of any race) | 3.4% |

=== 2000 census ===
As of the 2000 census, there were 3,971 people, 1,622 households, and 1,026 families residing in the city. The population density was 1,280.5 inhabitants per square mile (494.4/km^{2}).

There were 1,622 households, out of which 28.7% had children under the age of 18 living with them, 46.5% were married couples living together, 13.4% had a female householder with no husband present, and 36.7% were non-families. 33.8% of all households were made up of individuals, and 19.2% had someone living alone who was 65 years of age or older. The average household size was 2.32 and the average family size was 2.96.

In the city, the population was spread out, with 25.6% under the age of 18, 8.2% from 18 to 24, 22.9% from 25 to 44, 21.6% from 45 to 64, and 21.7% who were 65 years of age or older. The median age was 40 years. For every 100 females, there were 90.3 males. For every 100 females age 18 and over, there were 84.7 males.

The median income for a household in the city was $23,835, and the median income for a family was $31,836. Males had a median income of $26,556 versus $18,989 for females. The per capita income for the city was $12,633. About 11.6% of families and 19.2% of the population were below the poverty line, including 24.0% of those under age 18 and 11.5% of those age 65 or over.

== Economy ==
At the beginning of the 21st Century, Nowata had 130 different businesses. The most notable was the forty-bed Jane Phillips Nowata Health Center. The weekly Nowata Star newspaper kept readers informed about local events and issues.

== Government ==
The city has a council-manager form of government.

== Transportation ==
Nowata is served by two U.S. highways, one airport, and one Class 1 railroad

=== Highways ===
- US-169 is the main north–south U.S. Highway for both the city of Nowata and Nowata County. The highway runs along Ash Street from just north of the Nowata Municipal Airport from nearby Lenapah, to where it exits the city to the south over the Union Pacific viaduct east of Memorial Park Cemetery. The highway continues south toward Tulsa, Oklahoma.
- US-60 is the main east–west U.S. Highway for both Nowata and Nowata County. US-60 follows Vinita Road on the east side of the city of Nowata. The highway turns to the northwest at the intersection of Vinita Road/Gerlach Street/East Fairview Avenue, then turns west on Cherokee Avenue at South Hill Street. The highway remains on Cherokee Avenue, crosses US-169 at Ash Street to Pine Street where it turns to the north. The highway runs north on Pine Street for one city block to West Delaware. The highway then follows West Delaware Avenue, where it will continue west for one city block then turn north on North Pecan Street. The highway then runs along North Pecan Street for one city block where it turns west onto W. Davis Drive. The highway follows West Davis Drive, turns northwest at Mississippi Street, continues on West Davis Drive, then exits the city northwest of Turner Lane, continuing west toward the city of Bartlesville

=== Airport ===
Nowata Municipal Airport is located on the north side of the city on US-169. Runway 17/35 is 2,500 by 45 feet (762 by 14 m) and is an asphalt paved runway. Runway 5/23 is a grass runway measuring 2,500 by 45 feet (762 by 14 m). The facility is owned by the City of Nowata.

=== Railroad ===
Nowata is served by the Union Pacific Railroad. The Wagoner Subdivision begins to the north in the nearby city of Coffeyville, Kansas and runs roughly parallel with US-169 through Nowata County. The subdivision runs through the towns of South Coffeyville, Lenapah, Delaware, Nowata, and Watova. The Union Pacific Wagoner Subdivision and the BNSF Cherokee Subdivision have a diamond in the nearby city of Claremore, Oklahoma. The south end of the Wagoner Subdivision is located in the city of Van Buren, Arkansas.

== Filmography ==
Nowata was the setting for the 1998 movie Possums. In the movie, a man played by Mac Davis tries to bring back the town's cancelled high school football program. Scenes were filmed in town and guest starred Barry Switzer and many locals.

== Notable people ==
- Kurt Burris, football player
- Flora Campbell, actress and star of the first network TV soap opera, Faraway Hill
- Julian Wood Glass Jr., businessman and philanthropist
- Lulu M. Hefner, first woman to drill a producing oil well
- Ray Starr, baseball player

== See also ==
- National Register of Historic Places listings in Nowata County, Oklahoma
