= Coffeyville, Kansas =

City in Montgomery County, Kansas

- City
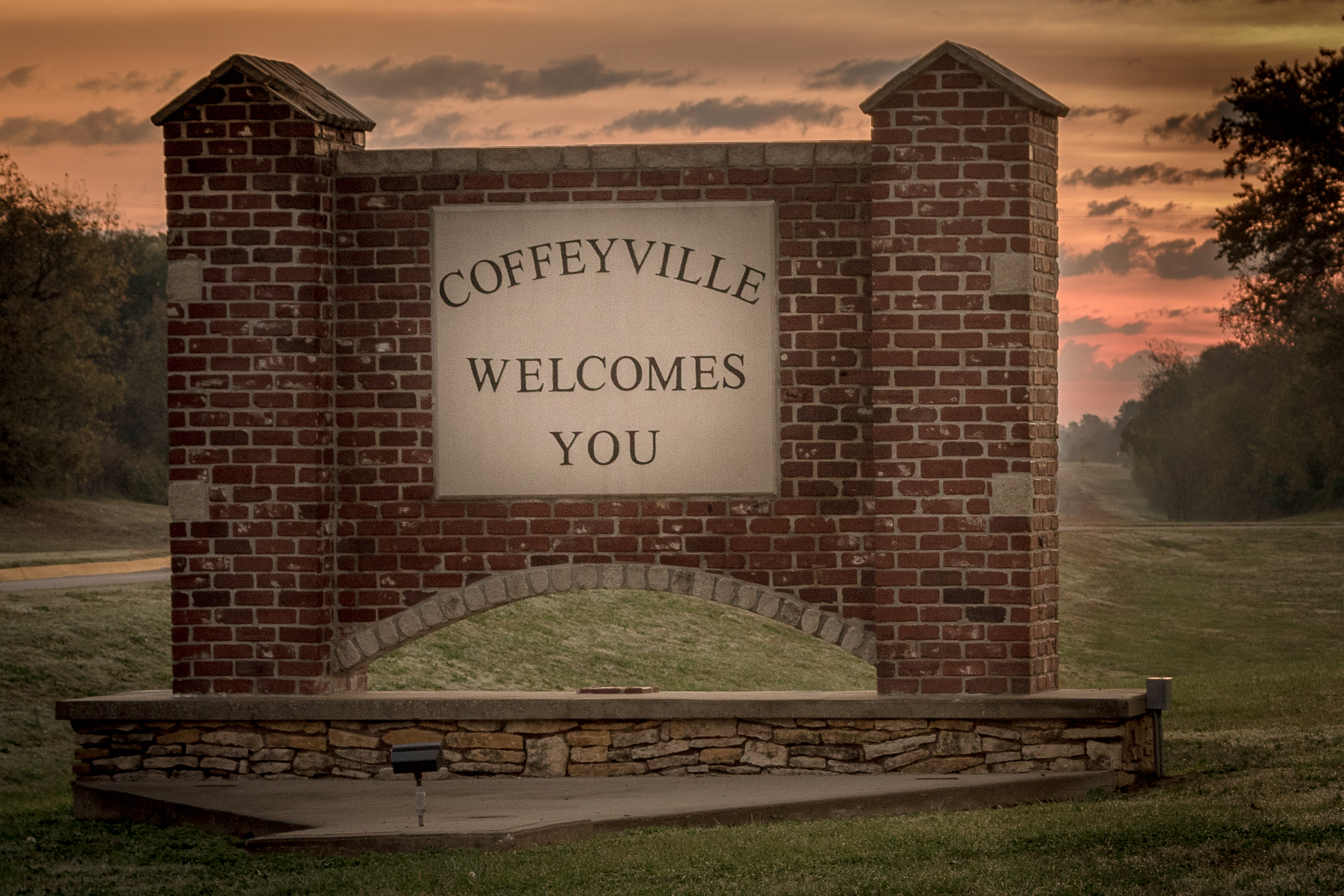
- Sign at the west entrance (2016)

- Flag Logo

- Location within Montgomery County and Kansas

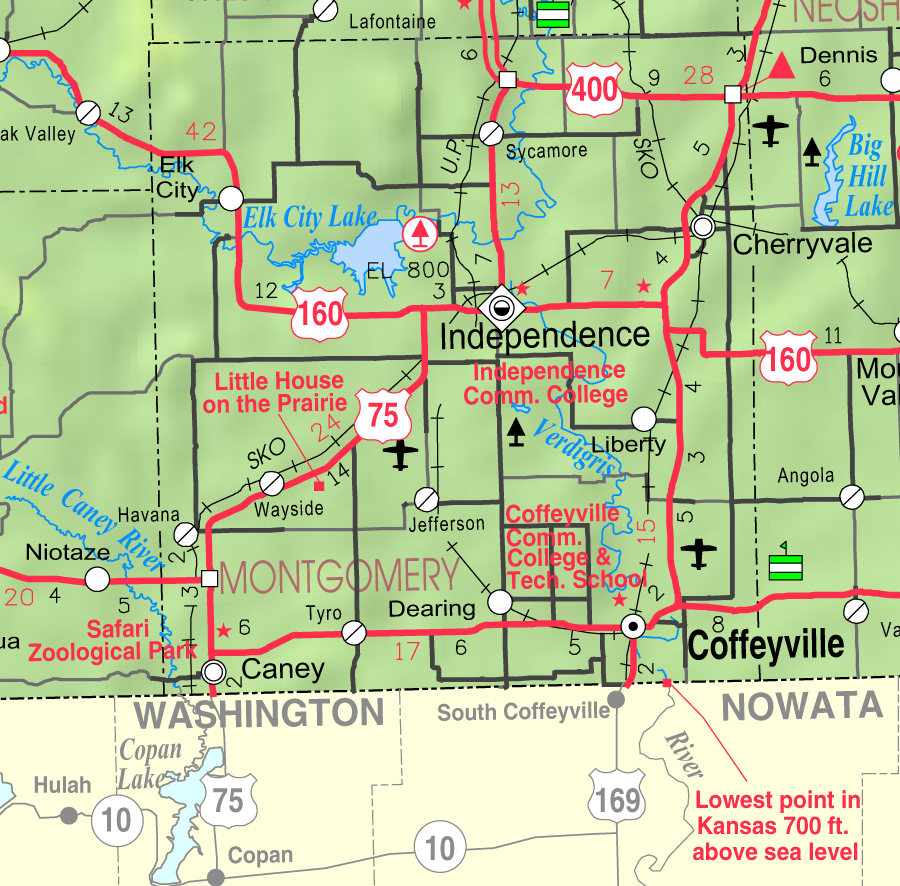
- KDOT map of Montgomery County (legend)
- Coordinates: 37°02′06″N 95°37′48″W
- Country: United States
- State: Kansas
- County: Montgomery
- Founded: 1869
- Incorporated: 1873
- Named for: James A. Coffey

Government
  - Type: Commission-Manager
  - Mayor: Deborah Maples
  - City Manager: Ben Brubaker

Area
  - Total: 9.47 sq mi (24.52 km^{2})
  - Land: 9.47 sq mi (24.52 km^{2})
  - Water: 0 sq mi (0.00 km^{2})
- Elevation: 735 ft (224 m)

Population (2020)
  - Total: 8,826
  - Density: 932.3/sq mi (360.0/km^{2})
- Time zone: UTC-6 (CST)
  - Summer (DST): UTC-5 (CDT)
- ZIP Code: 67337
- Area code: 620
- FIPS code: 20-14600
- GNIS ID: 485556
- Website: coffeyville.com

Coffeyville is a city in southeastern Montgomery County, Kansas, United States, located along the Verdigris River in the state's southeastern region. As of the 2020 census, the population of the city was 8,826. Coffeyville is the most populous city of Montgomery County, and the home to Coffeyville Community College. The town of South Coffeyville, Oklahoma is approximately 1 mile (1.6 km) south of the city.

== History ==
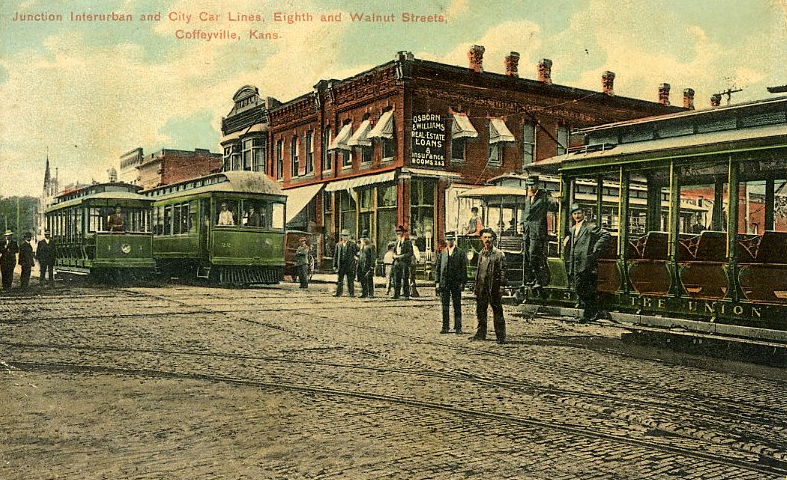
Coffeyville trollies, ca. 1900

This settlement was founded in 1869 as an Indian trading post by Col. James A. Coffey, serving the population across the border in what was then the Indian Territory. The town was stimulated in 1871 by being made a stop on the Leavenworth, Lawrence & Galveston Railroad, which connected it to other markets and developments. With the arrival of the railroad, a young surveyor, Napoleon B. Blanton, was dispatched to lay out the town. The naming of the town was left to the toss of a coin between Col. Coffey and U.S. Army Captain Blanton. Coffey won the toss and the town was officially named Coffeyville.

The city was incorporated in 1872, but the charter was voided as illegal, and the city was re-incorporated in March 1873.

As a frontier settlement, Coffeyville had its share of violence. On October 5, 1892, four of the Dalton Gang were killed in a shootout during an attempted bank robbery; Emmett Dalton survived with 23 gunshot wounds and later pleaded guilty to second-degree murder, although he later asserted that he never fired a shot during the robbery. He served 14 years before being pardoned. The gang had been trying to rob the First National and Condon banks, located across the street from each other. Law enforcement personnel and civilians recognized them under their disguises of fake beards and attacked the gang members as they fled one of the banks. Three civilians and a local marshal, Charles T. Connelly, died defending the town. The town holds an annual celebration each October to commemorate the Dalton Raid.

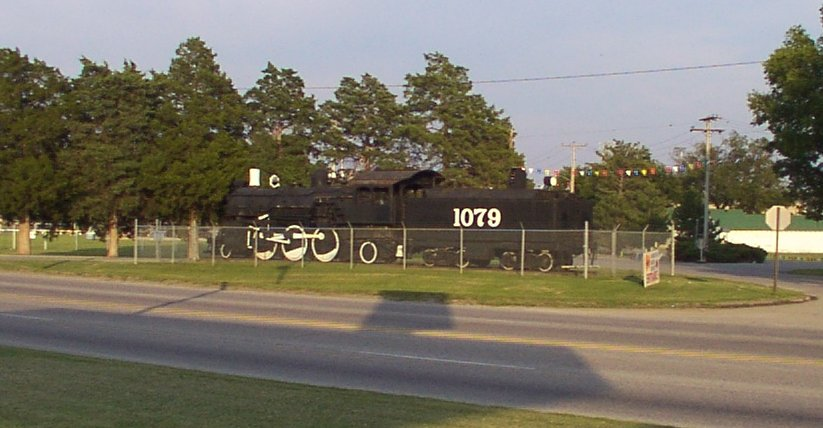
Atchison, Topeka and Santa Fe Railroad Locomotive 1079 on static display (2002)

After the discovery of its resources of plentiful natural gas and abundant clay, Coffeyville enjoyed rapid growth from 1890 to 1910, as its population expanded sixfold. Many of the Coffeyville buildings now appearing in the National Register of Historic Places (NRHP) were built during this time period. They include the Old Condon National Bank (now the Perkins Building, c. 1890, added 1/12/1973), the Brown Mansion (c. 1904–1907, added 12/12/1976), the new larger Bethel African Methodist Episcopal Church (c. 1907, added 7/28/1995), the Midland Theater (c. 1928, added 2/9/2005), and the Charles M. Ball House (c. 1906–1908, added 2/7/2011).

From the turn of the 20th century to the 1930s, Coffeyville was one of the largest glass and brick manufacturing centers in the nation. During this same period, the development of oil production attracted the founding of several oil field equipment manufacturers, and more workers and residents.

In March 1927, a racially charged riot occurred after three African American men were arrested on a false accusation of raping two teenage girls. A white mob stormed the jail, but were unable to locate the three men. The mob then attacked African Americans on the streets. Kansas National Guardsmen arrived and restored order.

=== Early Sunday School ===
In 1930 residents who were members of the Church of Jesus Christ of Latter-day Saints (LDS) organized a Sunday School; it was one of only 11 places in Kansas to have such a facility then.

=== Coffeyville Multiscope ===
Coffeyville industrialist Douglas Brown founded Coffeyville Multiscope, which produced components of the Norden bombsight. This played a determining role in the perfection of precision daylight bombing during World War II as a result of the bombsight's advanced accuracy and drift correction capability.

=== 2007 flood ===
On July 1, 2007, Coffeyville suffered a major flood when the Verdigris River crested at 10 feet above flood stage and flooded approximately a third of the city. The flood topped the local refinery (Coffeyville Resources LLC) levees by 4 feet, allowing oil to pollute the water. Approximately 1700 barrels (71,000 gallons) of crude oil mingled with the already contaminated flood waters. The EPA worked to prevent the oil and flood water mix from continuing downriver, where it could damage the water in Oologah Lake near Oologah, Oklahoma. Many residential water supplies are drawn from that lake. A minimal amount of oil reached Oologah Lake, and it did not pose a threat to the water supplies of other cities along the Verdigris River or from the lake. A number of animals were found dead or injured in flood areas, covered with oil.

By July 2, areas east of Patterson Street were off limits, and a curfew was enacted in other areas of the city. On July 3, the city lost its supply of potable water, but the water service was restored and the order to boil water rescinded on July 7. The Federal Emergency Management Agency (FEMA) and the Red Cross came to aid residents, and Kansas Governor Kathleen Sebelius and President George W. Bush declared the city a federal disaster area. Most displaced residents found shelter with family and friends, but many were sheltered in two area churches and a senior citizens' apartment complex. Some pets were rescued to a temporary animal shelter built for them at LeClere Park.

The flooded area on the city's east side was reopened on July 11 for residents and business owners to begin assessing damage and to retrieve salvageable items.

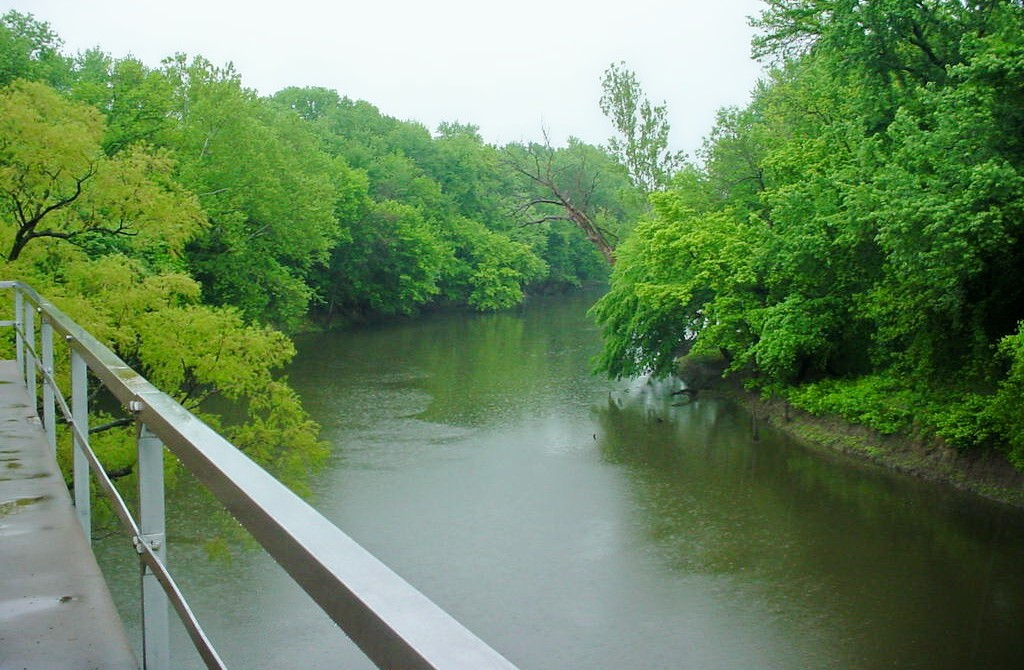
The Verdigris River at Coffeyville (2006)

In order to focus on the post-flood recovery and clean-up, the city and state cancelled the 2007 Inter-State Fair & Rodeo. The ongoing flood recovery included a wholesale environmental remediation of the flood-affected eastern portion of the city, which continued through late 2008 to early 2009. Many of the flood-damaged homes were purchased by Coffeyville Resources LLC as a part of its effort to compensate the homeowners affected by the oil spill.

== Geography ==
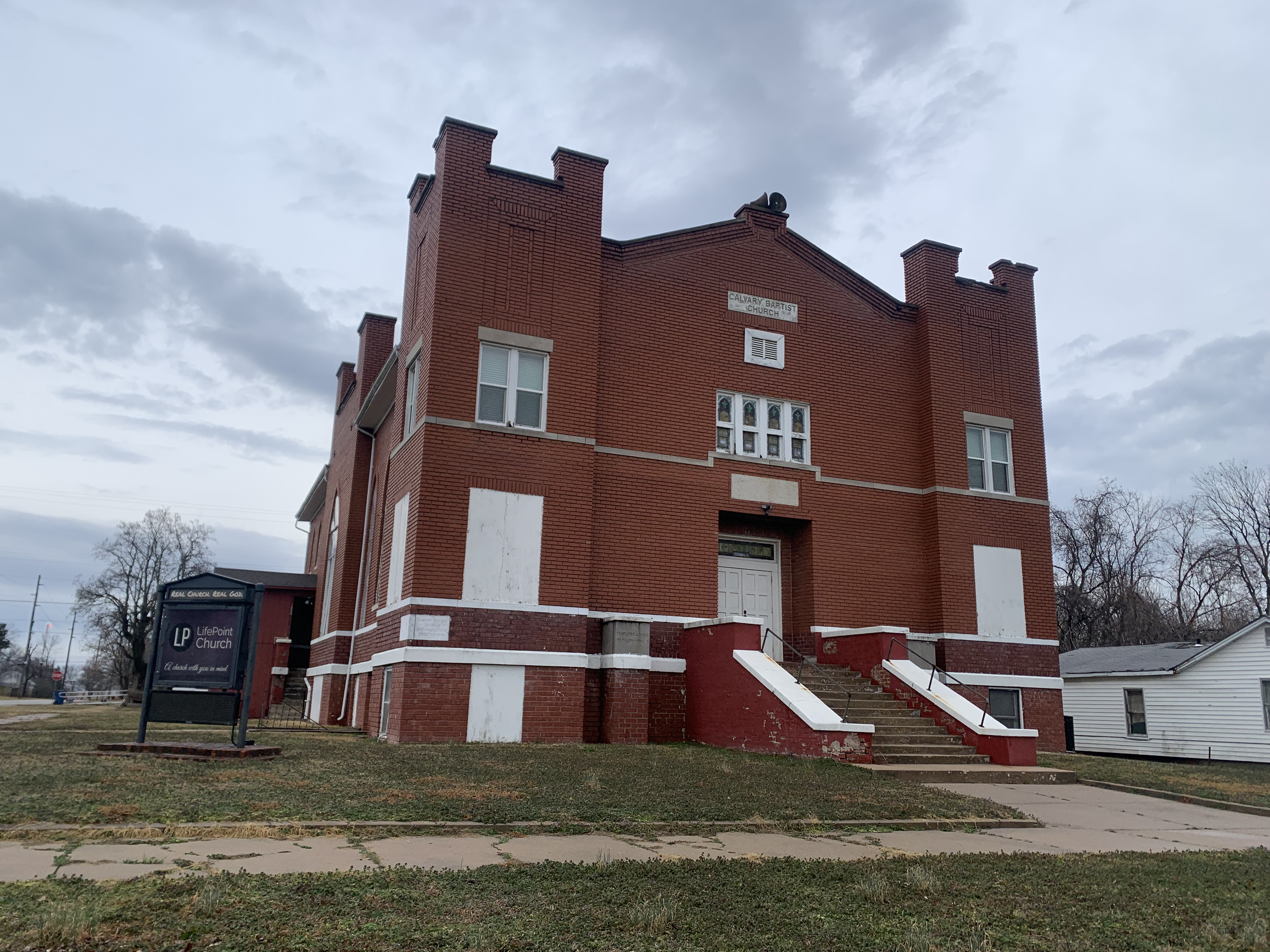
Calvary Baptist Church building in Coffeyville (2026)

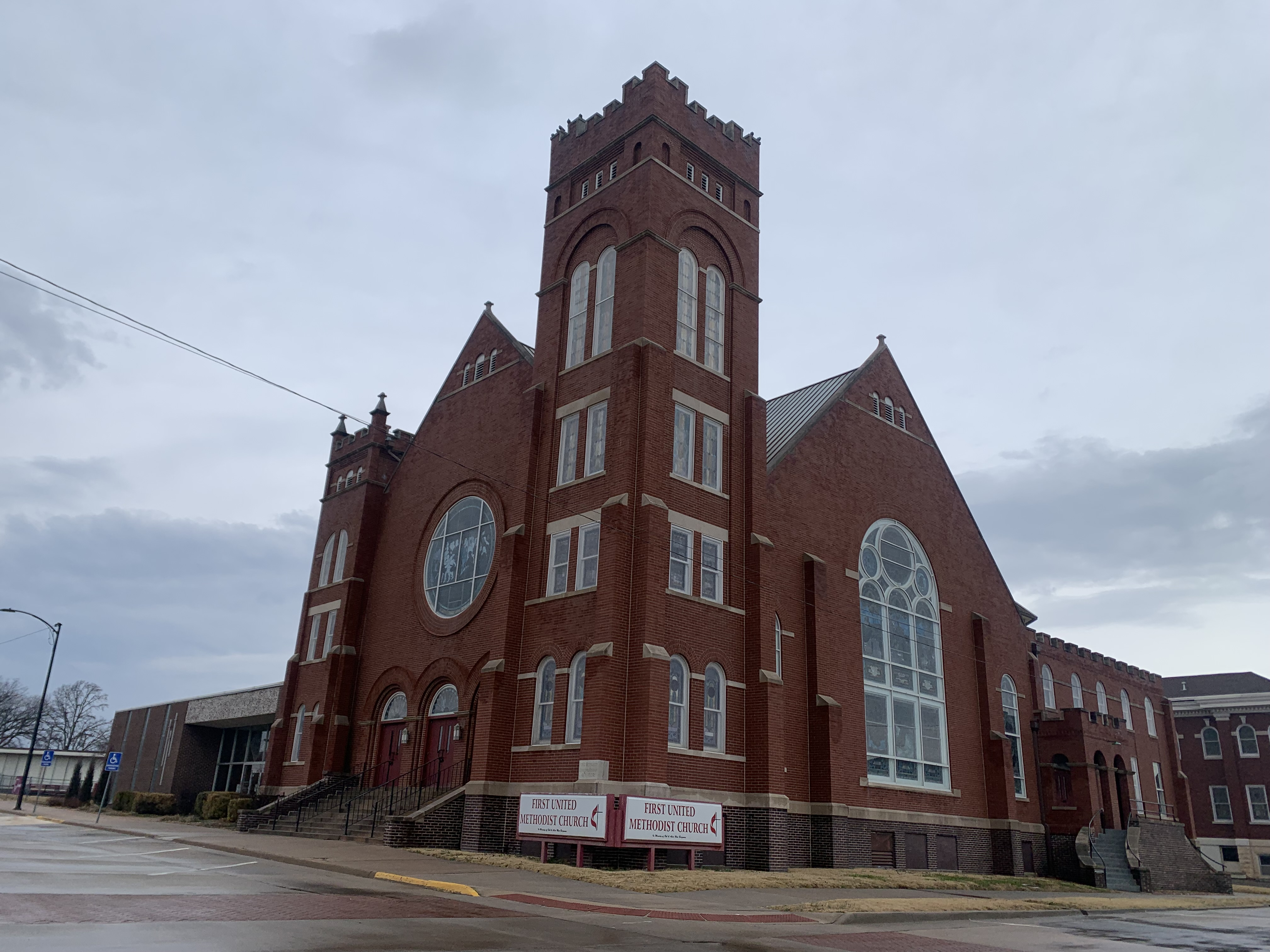
First United Methodist Church in Coffeyville (2026)

Coffeyville is in the southeast corner of Kansas, about 75 miles (121 km) north of Tulsa, Oklahoma, and 60 miles (97 km) west of Joplin, Missouri. The city is situated about one-half mile north of the Oklahoma state line along the west bank of the Verdigris River. The city is the location of the lowest point in the state of Kansas at 679 feet (207 m) above sea level. Coffeyville Municipal Airport is a few miles northeast of the city along US-169. Though Coffeyville is the largest city in Montgomery County, the county seat is Independence, 16 miles (26 km) northwest of the city.

Coffeyville, specifically a spot just north of Coffeyville Country Club, is the default center starting point of Google Maps, being the accidental center point of the default starting map being displayed, which shows the 48 contiguous United States. (Lawrence, Kansas also claims to be the Google center as it has been the default midpoint of the interactive 3D map Google Earth). Other locations that are considered to be the geographic center of the contiguous United States are also in Kansas.

According to the United States Census Bureau, the city has a total area of 7.43 square miles (19.24 km^{2}), all land.

=== Climate ===
According to the Köppen Climate Classification system, Coffeyville has a humid subtropical climate, abbreviated "Cfa" on climate maps. The hottest temperature recorded in Coffeyville was 113 °F (45.0 °C) on August 4, 2012, while the coldest temperature recorded was −22 °F (−30.0 °C) on February 10, 2011. The city falls within USDA plant hardiness zone 7a (0 to 5 °F; −18 to −15 °C).

Climate data for Coffeyville, Kansas, 1991–2020 normals, extremes 1996–present
Month	Jan	Feb	Mar	Apr	May	Jun	Jul	Aug	Sep	Oct	Nov	Dec	Year
Record high °F (°C)	76 (24)	86 (30)	90 (32)	95 (35)	95 (35)	103 (39)	111 (44)	113 (45)	108 (42)	97 (36)	87 (31)	78 (26)	113 (45)
Mean maximum °F (°C)	71.3 (21.8)	74.8 (23.8)	82.1 (27.8)	85.9 (29.9)	89.7 (32.1)	96.2 (35.7)	101.2 (38.4)	101.7 (38.7)	95.5 (35.3)	88.0 (31.1)	78.2 (25.7)	69.1 (20.6)	103.1 (39.5)
Mean daily maximum °F (°C)	44.8 (7.1)	50.7 (10.4)	59.4 (15.2)	68.9 (20.5)	76.9 (24.9)	85.8 (29.9)	90.6 (32.6)	90.7 (32.6)	82.5 (28.1)	71.4 (21.9)	58.4 (14.7)	48.0 (8.9)	69.0 (20.6)
Daily mean °F (°C)	34.1 (1.2)	38.9 (3.8)	47.7 (8.7)	57.1 (13.9)	66.6 (19.2)	75.6 (24.2)	80.3 (26.8)	79.5 (26.4)	71.2 (21.8)	59.6 (15.3)	47.4 (8.6)	37.6 (3.1)	58.0 (14.4)
Mean daily minimum °F (°C)	23.4 (−4.8)	27.1 (−2.7)	36.0 (2.2)	45.3 (7.4)	56.3 (13.5)	65.5 (18.6)	70.1 (21.2)	68.3 (20.2)	59.9 (15.5)	47.8 (8.8)	36.3 (2.4)	27.2 (−2.7)	46.9 (8.3)
Mean minimum °F (°C)	6.2 (−14.3)	8.8 (−12.9)	19.3 (−7.1)	29.7 (−1.3)	41.9 (5.5)	54.7 (12.6)	61.5 (16.4)	57.4 (14.1)	46.6 (8.1)	30.7 (−0.7)	19.5 (−6.9)	10.9 (−11.7)	1.6 (−16.9)
Record low °F (°C)	−10 (−23)	−22 (−30)	−1 (−18)	23 (−5)	32 (0)	48 (9)	51 (11)	48 (9)	36 (2)	22 (−6)	8 (−13)	−12 (−24)	−22 (−30)
Average precipitation inches (mm)	1.80 (46)	1.97 (50)	3.32 (84)	4.63 (118)	7.30 (185)	5.63 (143)	4.06 (103)	4.01 (102)	4.28 (109)	4.02 (102)	2.64 (67)	2.45 (62)	46.11 (1,171)
Average snowfall inches (cm)	1.8 (4.6)	1.4 (3.6)	1.3 (3.3)	0.0 (0.0)	0.0 (0.0)	0.0 (0.0)	0.0 (0.0)	0.0 (0.0)	0.0 (0.0)	0.0 (0.0)	0.6 (1.5)	3.2 (8.1)	8.3 (21.1)
Average precipitation days (≥ 0.01 in)	5.2	6.3	8.2	9.0	11.0	9.0	7.0	7.2	6.4	8.0	5.4	5.6	88.3
Average snowy days (≥ 0.1 in)	1.0	1.0	0.4	0.1	0.0	0.0	0.0	0.0	0.0	0.0	0.4	1.0	3.9
Source 1: NOAA
Source 2: National Weather Service (mean maxima/minima 2006–2020)

== Demographics ==
Historical population
Census	Pop.	Note	%±
1880	753		—
1890	2,282		203.1%
1900	4,953		117.0%
1910	12,687		156.1%
1920	13,452		6.0%
1930	16,198		20.4%
1940	17,355		7.1%
1950	17,113		−1.4%
1960	17,382		1.6%
1970	15,116		−13.0%
1980	15,185		0.5%
1990	12,917		−14.9%
2000	11,021		−14.7%
2010	10,295		−6.6%
2020	8,826		−14.3%
2023 (est.)	8,570		−2.9%
U.S. Decennial Census; 2010-2020

Coffeyville has experienced a slow and steady population decline since around 1960, when its population peaked at more than 17,000. Changes in industry and oil production have caused a loss of jobs in the area, and residents have moved to find work.

=== 2020 census ===
As of the 2020 census, Coffeyville had a population of 8,826, with 3,587 households and 2,013 families. The median age was 37.7 years. 23.6% of residents were under the age of 18 and 18.9% of residents were 65 years of age or older. For every 100 females there were 96.4 males, and for every 100 females age 18 and over there were 95.2 males age 18 and over.

There were 4,538 housing units, of which 21.0% were vacant. The homeowner vacancy rate was 4.3% and the rental vacancy rate was 19.2%. The population density was 932.1 inhabitants per square mile (359.9/km^{2}), and the housing unit density was 479.2 per square mile (185.0/km^{2}). 98.7% of residents lived in urban areas, while 1.3% lived in rural areas.

There were 3,587 households in Coffeyville, of which 27.5% had children under the age of 18 living in them. Of all households, 35.4% were married-couple households, 23.6% were households with a male householder and no spouse or partner present, and 33.5% were households with a female householder and no spouse or partner present. About 38.4% of all households were made up of individuals and 17.1% had someone living alone who was 65 years of age or older. The average household size was 2.2 and the average family size was 3.1.

Racial composition as of the 2020 census
Race	Number	Percent
White	5,707	64.7%
Black or African American	987	11.2%
American Indian and Alaska Native	371	4.2%
Asian	63	0.7%
Native Hawaiian and Other Pacific Islander	5	0.1%
Some other race	571	6.5%
Two or more races	1,122	12.7%
Hispanic or Latino (of any race)	1,114	12.6%

The non-Hispanic White share of the population was 61.93%.

=== Education ===
The percent of those with a bachelor's degree or higher was estimated to be 12.8% of the population.

=== Income and poverty ===
The 2016–2020 5-year American Community Survey estimates show that the median household income was $34,727 (with a margin of error of +/- $4,105) and the median family income was $41,726 (+/- $7,041). Males had a median income of $26,747 (+/- $6,181) versus $17,207 (+/- $2,741) for females. The median income for those above 16 years old was $20,489 (+/- $2,163). Approximately, 20.5% of families and 26.2% of the population were below the poverty line, including 33.1% of those under the age of 18 and 16.5% of those ages 65 or over.

=== 2010 census ===
As of the census of 2010, there were 10,295 people, 4,226 households, and 2,456 families residing in the city. The population density was 1,385.6 inhabitants per square mile (535.0/km^{2}). There were 5,021 housing units at an average density of 675.8 per square mile (260.9/km^{2}). The racial makeup of the city was 72.3% White, 11.7% African American, 5.0% Native American, 0.7% Asian, 0.2% Pacific Islander, 3.3% from other races, and 6.8% from two or more races. Hispanic or Latino of any race were 7.4% of the population.

There were 4,226 households, of which 28.2% had children under the age of 18 living with them, 39.9% were married couples living together, 13.5% had a female householder with no husband present, 4.8% had a male householder with no wife present, and 41.9% were non-families. 35.7% of all households were made up of individuals, and 16.1% had someone living alone who was 65 years of age or older. The average household size was 2.29 and the average family size was 2.98.

The median age in the city was 37.1 years. 22.6% of residents were under the age of 18; 13.3% were between the ages of 18 and 24; 22.4% were from 25 to 44; 23.6% were from 45 to 64; and 18.1% were 65 years of age or older. The gender makeup of the city was 47.5% male and 52.5% female.

== Economy ==
Coffeyville has a long history as a center of industry and manufacturing. Coffeyville Resources operates a 100,000 barrels per day refinery and a large nitrogen fertilizer plant, using a unique Texaco process of ammonia extraction from coke byproducts produced in the refinery. Sherwin-Williams Chemical Co. has operated a smelting facility in the community since 1909.

Coffeyville is also home to John Deere Corporation's Coffeyville Works, which is a major manufacturer of off-road equipment automatic transmissions for the construction, agriculture and mining industries. Acme Foundry is a foundry that has been in operation since 1905 and employs more than 300 people.

Taylor Crane & Rigging is a regional hauling operation, full-service industrial mover and craning services company. Taylor also maintains a facility in Tulsa, Oklahoma. Other nearby in-county employers include Cessna Aircraft Division of Textron and Spears Manufacturing, a large producer of extruded PVC pipe products.

Historic

Southwire Corp is a maker of stranded and solid core wire and acquired the Leviton Industries facility of American Insulated Wire in 2010. The plant was closed in 2014.

Coffeyville was home to an Amazon.com warehouse from 1999 to 2015. It was closed because Amazon was shifting to warehouses closer to large cities. The facility was previously operated by Golden Books.

== Education ==
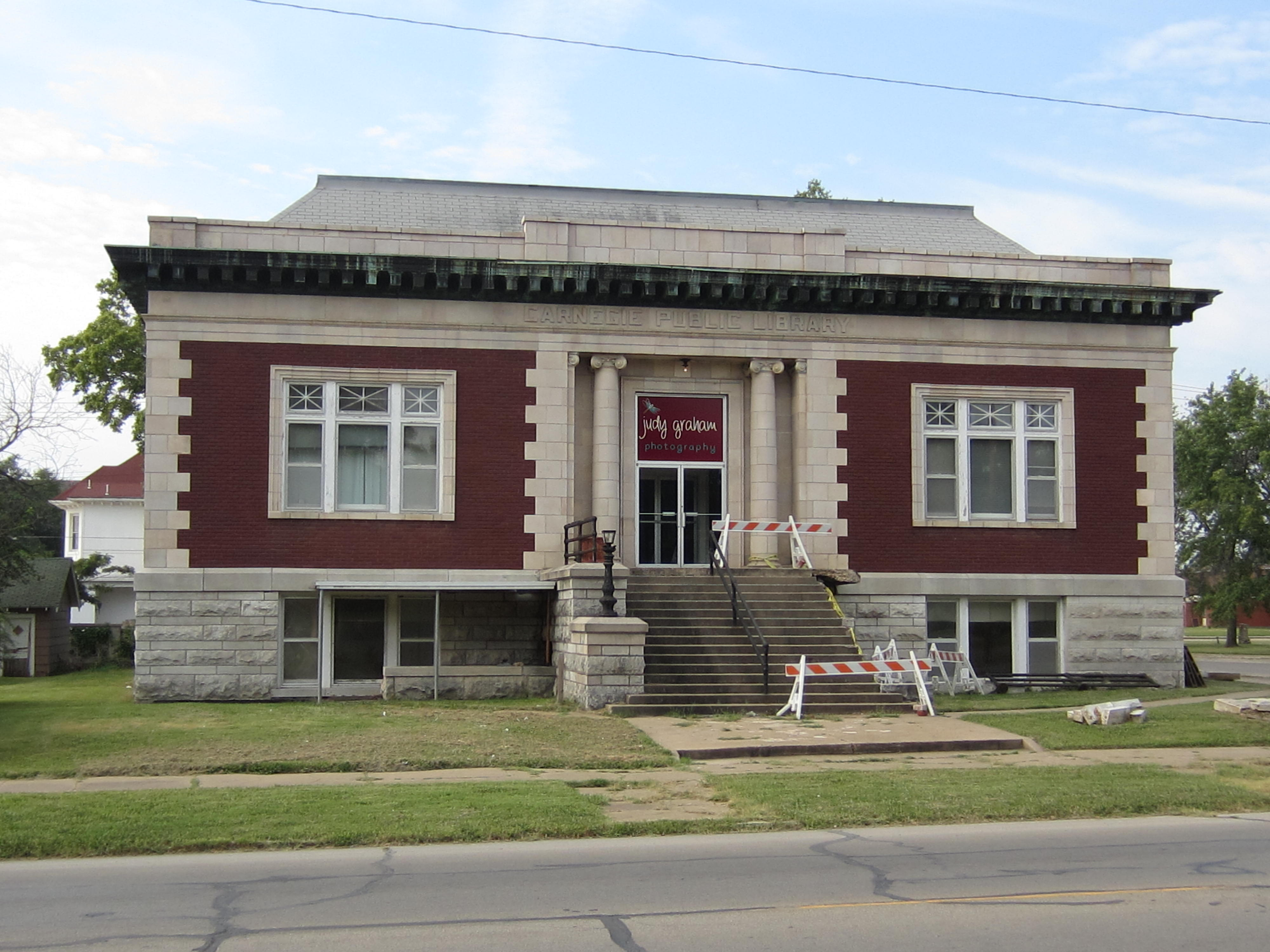
Coffeyville Carnegie Library with entrance being repaired (2013)

=== Public ===
The community is served by Coffeyville USD 445 public school district, which educates around 2,000 students in three facilities. The district has one early learning center, one large consolidated elementary school with four pods and an Age-to-Age kindergarten, one middle school and one high school.

- Field Kindley High School, grades 9–12, named after Field Kindley.
- Roosevelt Middle School, grades 7–8.
- Community Elementary School, grades K–6. Age-to-Age Kindergarten
- Dr. Jerry Hamm Early Learning Center, grades preschool.

=== Private ===
- Holy Name School, grades PK-6, parochial private school operated by the Roman Catholic Diocese of Wichita.

=== College ===
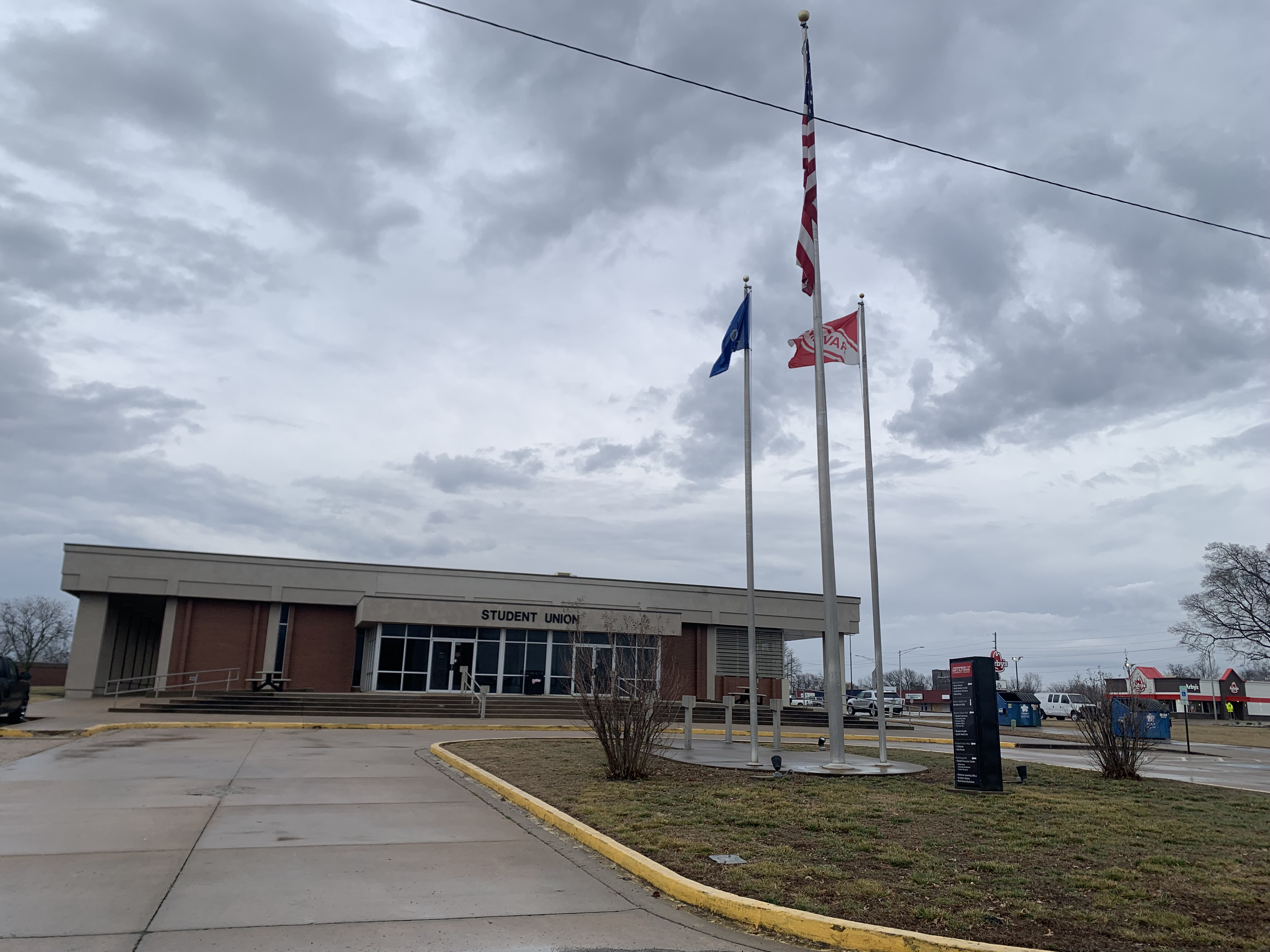
Coffeyville Community College Student Union (2026)

Advanced education is provided by Coffeyville Community College at three campuses. The main campus and technical trades campus are each in Coffeyville, while a third campus is in Columbus, Kansas. Four-year college degrees are offered by Oklahoma Wesleyan University, Friends University and Sterling College at the main Coffeyville Community College campus. Coffeyville Community College has a long history of academic and athletic success.

== Transportation ==
Bus service is provided northward towards Kansas City, Missouri and southward towards Tulsa, Oklahoma by Jefferson Lines (subcontractor of Greyhound Lines). Coffeyville and surrounding communities are also served by Connections Transportation which has its headquarters in nearby Independence, Kansas. Coffeyville has two railroads that serve the community, the Union Pacific Railroad and a short line railroad, South Kansas and Oklahoma Railroad which is owned by Watco. Coffeyville is served by two U.S. highways, US 166 which runs east–west from where the highway enters from the east at the Verdigris River bridge on Northeast Street to Eleventh Street, and exits to the west at the Union Pacific Railroad viaduct on Eighth Street. US 169 which is a north–south highway, enters from the east at the Verdigris River bridge on Northeast Street to Eleventh Street, then turns left just past the South Kansas and Oklahoma Railroad overpass onto Walnut Street and continues south on Walnut Street and exits the city and continues south towards Tulsa, Oklahoma.

Coffeyville Municipal Airport (KCFV; FAA ID: CFV), about 4 miles (6.4 km) northeast, has two runways, the longest 5,868 by 100 feet (1,789 m × 30 m). Commercial air transportation is available out of Tulsa International Airport, about 66 miles (106 km) south.

== Media ==
The Coffeyville Journal is the local newspaper, published twice a week.

One AM and three FM radio stations are licensed to and/or broadcast from Coffeyville. KGGF (AM) broadcasts on 690 AM, playing a News/Talk format. KUSN, a Country station, is licensed to Dearing, Kansas, but broadcasts from Coffeyville on 98.1 FM. KGGF-FM, licensed to Fredonia, Kansas, broadcasts an Oldies format from Coffeyville on 104.1 FM. KQQF is licensed to Coffeyville and broadcasts on 98.9 FM.

Coffeyville is in the Tulsa, Oklahoma television market.

== Notable people ==
Notable individuals who were born in and/or have lived in Coffeyville include:

- Micky Axton, aviator and educator
- Terry Beeson, NFL linebacker, Seattle Seahawks
- Bob Bettisworth, member of Alaska House of Representatives
- Mildred Burke, member of the Professional Wrestling Hall of Fame
- Phil Ehart, drummer of the rock band Kansas
- Wade Flemons, former member of the music group Earth, Wind & Fire
- Mondriel Fulcher, NFL player
- Denver David Hargis, Kansas politician
- Kenyon Hopkins, musician and composer
- Walter Johnson, Hall of Fame baseball pitcher
- Ron Kenoly, popular worship leader
- Field Eugene Kindley, aviator and World War I ace
- Jack "Dusty" Kleiss, World War II naval aviator, Navy Cross recipient, credited with sinking two Japanese aircraft carriers on June 4, 1942.
- Omar Knedlik, inventor of the ICEE frozen drink
- Rudy May, former Major League baseball pitcher
- Harold Clement McGugin, U.S. Congressman, 1931–1935
- William Mueller, professional wrestler known as "Trevor Murdoch" and "Jethro Holiday"
- Gary Paxton, record producer, recording artist, songwriter
- W. Ann Reynolds, zoologist, administrator at four universities
- Lafayette "Reb" Russell, football player and western movie actor
- Johnny Rutherford, race car driver, three-time Indy 500 winner
- Henry Schichtle, football player
- Cynthia Sikes, actress
- Frank Wickware, Negro leagues and Pre-Negro leagues baseball pitcher
- Wendell Willkie, 1940 Republican presidential candidate

== See also ==
- List of oil pipelines
- List of oil refineries
