= CLK =

CLK may refer to:

== Transport ==
- Cadillac and Lake City Railway
- Changle railway station (Shandong), China
- Clinton Regional Airport, Oklahoma, United States
- Clock House railway station, London, England
- Hong Kong International Airport
- Mercedes-Benz CLK-Class

== Other uses ==
- Public Schools of Calumet-Laurium-Keweenaw
- Česká lékařská komora (ČLK), a Czech doctors' organization; see David Rath
- Clackmannanshire, a historic county in Scotland
- Confederation of Labour of Kazakhstan
- Idu Mishmi language
- Hunter-Killer cruiser; see List of cruisers of the United States Navy
