= CLK-1 =

CLK-1, clk1, or variation, may refer to:

- USS Norfolk (CLK-1), post-World War II light cruiser reclassified as a destroyer leader (DL)
- clk-1 (gene), the clock-1 gene for ubiquinone biosynthesis encoding DMQ hydroxylase
- CLK1 (protein), the human enzyme dual specificity protein kinase CLK1, encoded by the CLK1 gene

== See also ==
- CLK (disambiguation)
