= Clinton, Oklahoma =

City in Oklahoma, United States

- City
- Motto: "Hub City of Western Oklahoma"
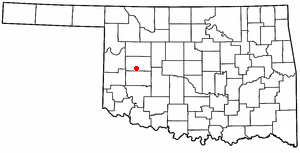
- Location of Clinton, Oklahoma
- Coordinates: 35°30′24″N 98°58′14″W
- Country: United States
- State: Oklahoma
- Counties: Custer, Washita

Government
  - Type: Council / Manager

Area
  - Total: 9.97 sq mi (25.81 km^{2})
  - Land: 9.95 sq mi (25.76 km^{2})
  - Water: 0.019 sq mi (0.05 km^{2})
- Elevation: 1,568 ft (478 m)

Population (2020)
  - Total: 8,521
  - Density: 856.6/sq mi (330.75/km^{2})
- Time zone: UTC-6 (Central (CST))
  - Summer (DST): UTC-5 (CDT)
- ZIP code: 73601
- Area code: 580
- FIPS code: 40-15400
- GNIS feature ID: 2409485
- Website: clintonok.gov

Clinton is a city in Custer and Washita counties in the U.S. state of Oklahoma. The population was 8,521 at the time of the 2020 census.

== History ==
The community began in 1899 when two men, J.L. Avant and E.E. Blake, decided to locate a town in the Washita River Valley.

Because of governmental stipulations that an Indian could sell no more than one half of a 160-acre (0.6 km^{2}) allotment, the men made plans to purchase 320 acres (1.3 km^{2}) from four different Indians (Hays, Shoe-Boy, Nowahy, and Night Killer) and paid them each $2,000 for 80 acres (320,000 m^{2}) to begin the small settlement of Washita Junction.

Congressional approval for the sale was granted in 1902 and Washita Junction quickly developed. The first businesses were the office of the Custer County Chronicle newspaper and the First National Bank building. When a post office was started, the postal department would not accept the name of Washita Junction; so the town was named for Judge Clinton F. Irwin.

Early on, Clinton was well-served by railroads: the Kansas City, Mexico and Orient Railway—which had its depot west of downtown—and both the St. Louis–San Francisco Railway and the Chicago, Rock Island and Pacific Railroad—which had their combined depot east of downtown. In 1909 a group of Clinton businessmen formed the Clinton Street Railway, which ran straight between the two depots particularly to service transferring passengers. But the line’s single gas-powered railcar proved problematic, and service stopped by 1911. In 1912 the line was electrified and restarted, while the new owners talked of extending the tracks north to the county seat of Arapaho, and perhaps even further to Taloga. However, a trolley’s collision in 1914 with an SLSF switch engine, killing one passenger and injuring others, caused the line to dissolve under lawsuits, and the rails were dug up and salvaged by 1915 to pay legal fees.

Clinton particularly benefited from the presence of U.S. Highway 66. Like most other cities and towns on Route 66, Clinton was home of tourist businesses including several restaurants, cafés, motels and filling stations. The Pop Hicks Restaurant was once the longest running restaurant on Route 66. It opened in 1936 and closed after a fire in 1999. The U.S. Highway 66 Association, founded 1927 in Tulsa, Oklahoma, curtailed its activity when World War II rationing of rubber and fuel disrupted leisure travel. After the war, Jack and Gladys Cutberth revived the organization in Clinton, where it promoted the "Main Street of America" from 1947 until it disbanded in the 1980s. Dr. Walter S. Mason Jr. operated a Best Western motel (1964–2003) which welcomed Elvis Presley as an occasional guest in the 1960s.

Today, cross-country traffic passes Clinton to the south on Interstate 40, which bypassed the city in 1970. Clinton remains a popular tourist stop as one of the largest Route 66 cities between Oklahoma City and Amarillo, Texas. Much of the old U.S. 66 route that passed through the city is now designated as an I-40 business loop; the town became home to the first state sponsored Route 66 Museum in the nation.

In 1942, the federal government built a naval airfield at nearby Burns Flat and named it Naval Air Station Clinton. During the World War II period, the population of Clinton grew to nearly 7,000 residents. In 1949, Naval Air Station Clinton was deactivated and the airfield was deeded to the City of Clinton, specifying that the land could be recaptured in case of national emergencies. Later, the government leased the site back and used it as Clinton-Sherman Air Force Base a bomber base supporting 4123rd Strategic Wing, then the 70th Bombardment Wing, Heavy of the Strategic Air Command (SAC), operating B-52 Stratofortress and KC-135 Stratotanker aircraft. Purchasing more land, the site soon expanded to more than 3,500 acres (14 km^{2}), where both the U.S. Air Force and the U.S. Navy utilized the airfield for both operational and training purposes. When military operations were de-emphasized, the Clinton-Sherman base was designated for closure in 1969. The entire complex was deeded to the City of Clinton in 1971 and three years later became the Clinton-Sherman Industrial Airpark.

Clinton is also home to the Clinton Daily News, a five-day daily newspaper edited by Sean Stephens which has a circulation of 4,500. The newspaper has been published continuously from its inception in 1927 to the current day.

== Geography ==
Clinton is located on historic U.S. Route 66, which is now Interstate 40.

According to the United States Census Bureau, the city has a total area of 8.9 square miles (23.2 km^{2}), of which 8.9 square miles (23.1 km^{2}) is land and 0.04 square mile (0.1 km^{2}) (0.22%) is water.

=== Climate ===
According to the Köppen Climate Classification system, Clinton has a humid subtropical climate, abbreviated "Cfa" on climate maps. The hottest temperature recorded in Clinton was 112 °F (44.4 °C) on July 19, 2022, while the coldest temperature recorded was −6 °F (−21.1 °C) on February 15, 2021.

Climate data for Clinton, Oklahoma, 1991–2020 normals, extremes 1945–present
Month	Jan	Feb	Mar	Apr	May	Jun	Jul	Aug	Sep	Oct	Nov	Dec	Year
Record high °F (°C)	83 (28)	91 (33)	94 (34)	99 (37)	106 (41)	110 (43)	112 (44)	111 (44)	108 (42)	100 (38)	92 (33)	79 (26)	112 (44)
Mean maximum °F (°C)	72.9 (22.7)	76.4 (24.7)	83.4 (28.6)	89.0 (31.7)	96.4 (35.8)	101.4 (38.6)	105.1 (40.6)	104.3 (40.2)	98.5 (36.9)	90.6 (32.6)	79.5 (26.4)	71.3 (21.8)	105.2 (40.7)
Mean daily maximum °F (°C)	51.1 (10.6)	55.2 (12.9)	64.7 (18.2)	73.8 (23.2)	81.8 (27.7)	90.6 (32.6)	95.2 (35.1)	94.3 (34.6)	86.4 (30.2)	74.8 (23.8)	61.4 (16.3)	51.2 (10.7)	73.4 (23.0)
Daily mean °F (°C)	38.1 (3.4)	41.9 (5.5)	51.3 (10.7)	59.6 (15.3)	69.1 (20.6)	78.3 (25.7)	82.8 (28.2)	81.5 (27.5)	73.9 (23.3)	61.5 (16.4)	48.9 (9.4)	39.2 (4.0)	60.5 (15.8)
Mean daily minimum °F (°C)	25.1 (−3.8)	28.7 (−1.8)	37.9 (3.3)	45.4 (7.4)	56.3 (13.5)	66.0 (18.9)	70.3 (21.3)	68.7 (20.4)	61.5 (16.4)	48.2 (9.0)	36.4 (2.4)	27.2 (−2.7)	47.6 (8.7)
Mean minimum °F (°C)	11.9 (−11.2)	15.8 (−9.0)	21.6 (−5.8)	31.0 (−0.6)	42.7 (5.9)	56.6 (13.7)	62.4 (16.9)	61.1 (16.2)	49.6 (9.8)	32.8 (0.4)	21.9 (−5.6)	12.7 (−10.7)	7.0 (−13.9)
Record low °F (°C)	−4 (−20)	−6 (−21)	1 (−17)	20 (−7)	26 (−3)	45 (7)	53 (12)	53 (12)	38 (3)	20 (−7)	11 (−12)	0 (−18)	−6 (−21)
Average precipitation inches (mm)	0.92 (23)	1.23 (31)	2.68 (68)	2.63 (67)	3.76 (96)	3.63 (92)	2.51 (64)	4.16 (106)	3.98 (101)	2.28 (58)	1.77 (45)	1.46 (37)	31.01 (788)
Average snowfall inches (cm)	2.6 (6.6)	2.0 (5.1)	0.5 (1.3)	0.0 (0.0)	0.0 (0.0)	0.0 (0.0)	0.0 (0.0)	0.0 (0.0)	0.0 (0.0)	trace	0.4 (1.0)	1.7 (4.3)	7.2 (18.3)
Average precipitation days (≥ 0.01 in)	4.7	5.4	6.0	5.7	8.2	8.2	5.4	5.9	6.5	6.2	5.6	4.7	72.5
Average snowy days (≥ 0.1 in)	1.4	1.0	0.4	0.0	0.0	0.0	0.0	0.0	0.0	0.0	0.2	1.1	4.1
Source 1: NOAA (average snow/snow days 1981-2010)
Source 2: National Weather Service

== Demographics ==
Historical population
Census	Pop.	Note	%±
1910	2,781		—
1920	2,596		−6.7%
1930	7,512		189.4%
1940	6,736		−10.3%
1950	7,555		12.2%
1960	9,617		27.3%
1970	10,359		7.7%
1980	9,730		−6.1%
1990	9,248		−5.0%
2000	8,833		−4.5%
2010	9,033		2.3%
2020	8,521		−5.7%
U.S. Decennial Census

=== 2020 census ===
As of the 2020 census, Clinton had a population of 8,521. The median age was 36.6 years. 27.7% of residents were under the age of 18 and 16.1% of residents were 65 years of age or older. For every 100 females there were 97.9 males, and for every 100 females age 18 and over there were 96.6 males age 18 and over.

94.1% of residents lived in urban areas, while 5.9% lived in rural areas.

There were 3,065 households in Clinton, of which 36.0% had children under the age of 18 living in them. Of all households, 45.3% were married-couple households, 19.4% were households with a male householder and no spouse or partner present, and 28.7% were households with a female householder and no spouse or partner present. About 27.9% of all households were made up of individuals and 11.7% had someone living alone who was 65 years of age or older.

There were 3,786 housing units, of which 19.0% were vacant. Among occupied housing units, 61.9% were owner-occupied and 38.1% were renter-occupied. The homeowner vacancy rate was 4.2% and the rental vacancy rate was 22.2%.

Racial composition as of the 2020 census
Race	Percent
White	56.1%
Black or African American	4.7%
American Indian and Alaska Native	8.2%
Asian	1.1%
Native Hawaiian and Other Pacific Islander	<0.1%
Some other race	13.0%
Two or more races	16.8%
Hispanic or Latino (of any race)	35.8%

=== 2015 estimate ===
In 2015, the median income for a household in the city was $27,051, and the median income for a family was $32,242. Males had a median income of $24,588 versus $18,596 for females. The per capita income for the city was $14,606. About 14.6% of families and 18.9% of the population were below the poverty line, including 23.9% of those under age 18 and 11.1% of those age 65 or over.

== Economy ==
Automotive manufacturer SportChassis, a maker of customized tow rigs, has its global headquarters in Clinton.

== Events ==
The Clinton Regional Airport was the site of the first crash of a C-5 Galaxy (68-0227) on September 27, 1974.

== Notable people ==
- Gordon Gore, professional football player
- Scott Hendricks, music producer
- Captain Frederick F. Henry, United States Army (deceased), Korean War Medal of Honor recipient
- Toby Keith, singer
- Earl Plumlee, War in Afghanistan Medal of Honor recipient
- Meg Randall, actress
- James R. Winchester, judge

== Education ==
Its school district is Clinton Public Schools.

Clinton has three elementary schools, one middle school and one high school within the public school system. There is also an alternative school that is part of the public school system.

== Sports ==
Clinton is known for its high school football team, the "Red Tornadoes". The Red Tornadoes have won 17 state championships (1965, 1967, 1968, 1969, 1978, 1982, 1984, 1996, 1997, 2000, 2001, 2003, 2004, 2005, 2007, 2012, 2021) which ranks currently second in the state of Oklahoma behind Ada. The Red Tornado football program currently ranks first in the state in all-time wins. Along with football, Clinton excels at a number of other sports. Other school sports include boys' and girls' basketball (the "Lady Red Tornadoes" or "Lady Reds"), baseball, girls' softball, wrestling, tennis, soccer, girls' volleyball, and track and field. Clinton's wrestling team earned its first trip to a dual state championship final in 2015; it would lose to longtime rival Tuttle Tigers. They returned to the dual state championship final in 2017 where they lost to Tuttle, again. The Lady Red Tornadoes soccer team won the State Championship in 2017 under the leadership of Coach Eugene Jefferson.

Team colors are maroon and gold and the school mascot is an anthropomorphic tornado named "Tony."

Clinton hosted Minor league baseball. The Clinton Bulldogs played as members of the Class D level Oklahoma State League in 1922 and 1923.

== Sights ==
=== Museums ===
- Oklahoma Route 66 Museum is the state's official showcase of Route 66, operated by the Oklahoma Historical Society, and located on historic U.S. Route 66.
- The Cheyenne Cultural Center was founded in hopes of preserving the Cheyenne people's way of life. The site has become a regional interpretive center for Cheyenne history and culture.

=== National Register of Historic Places ===
- Clinton Armory
- Crawford House
- McLain Rogers Park
- Y Service Station & Café
