= U.S. Route 66 in Oklahoma =

Former highway in Oklahoma

U.S. Highway 66
- Will Rogers Highway
- US 66 highlighted in red

Route information
- Maintained by ODOT
- Length: 374.6 mi (602.9 km) (as close as possible to the latest surface alignments, except at Tulsa and Oklahoma City); The length of SH-66 is 192.8 mi (310.3 km)
- Existed: December 7, 1926–April 1, 1985
- Tourist routes: Historic Route 66

Major junctions
- West end: US 66 at Texas state line
- US 81 in El Reno; US 60 near White Oak
- East end: US-66 at Kansas state line

Location
- Country: United States
- State: Oklahoma

Highway system
- United States Numbered Highway System; List; Special; Divided; Oklahoma State Highway System; Interstate; US; State; Turnpikes
← SH-65	→ SH-66

U.S. Route 66 (US 66, Route 66) in Oklahoma ran from west to northeast across the state of Oklahoma, along the path now taken by Interstate 40 (I-40) and State Highway 66 (SH-66). It passed through Oklahoma City, Tulsa, and many smaller communities. West of the Oklahoma City area, it has been largely replaced by I-40; the few independent portions that are still state-maintained are now I-40 Business. From Oklahoma City northeast to Kansas, the bypassing I-44 is mostly a toll road, and SH-66 remains as a free alternate.

== Route description ==
=== Texas border to Elk City ===
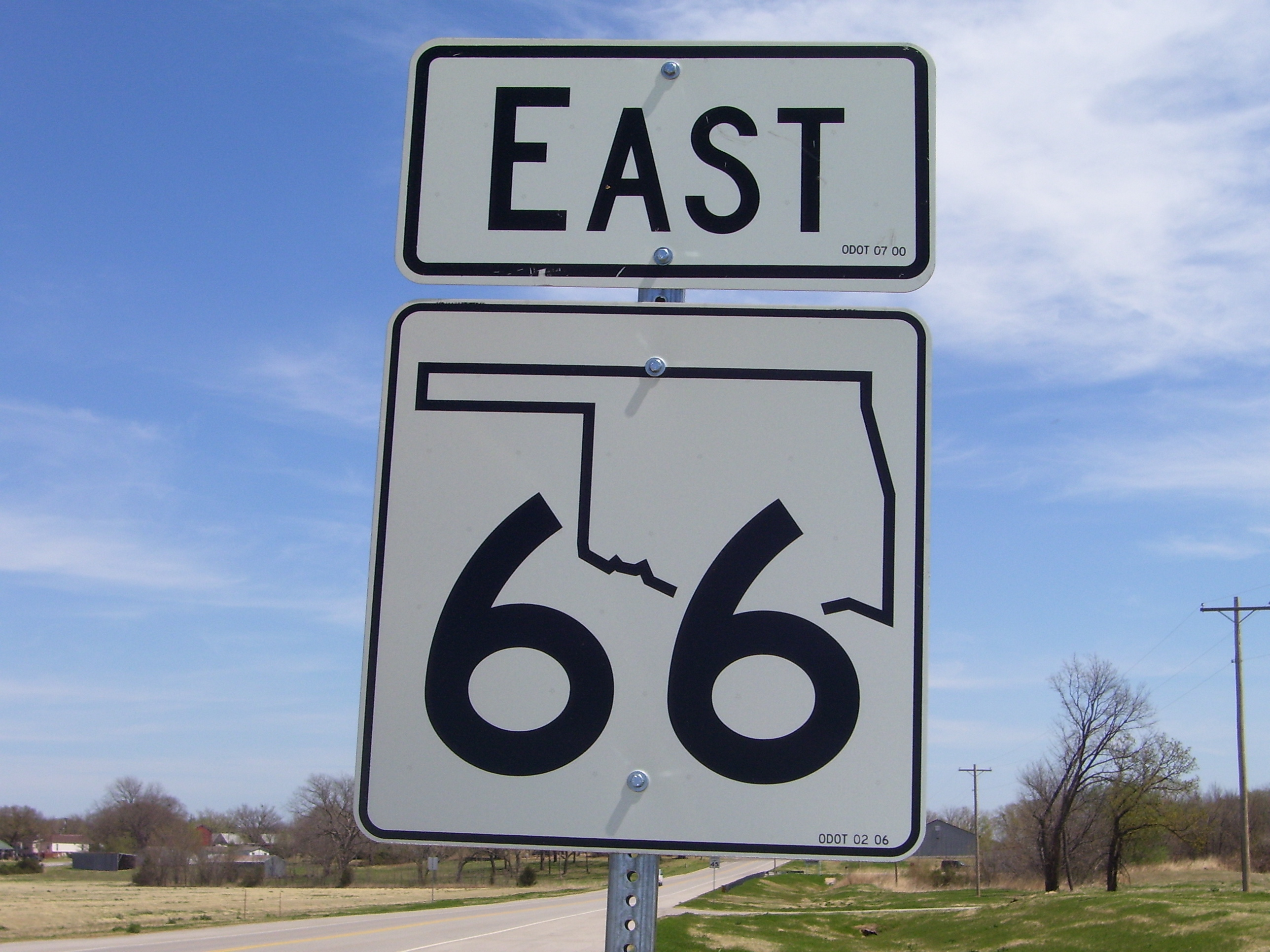
New-style SH-66 shield west of Arcadia

By 1916, a series of unpaved state roads was laid out from Texola, just east of the Texas state line, east via Erick to Delhi, north to Sayre, and east and north via Doxey to Elk City. It became part of US 66 in 1926; this initial alignment ran along the state line from a bit south of the old railroad grade south to E1240 Road, and then ran east through Texola on Fifth Street. After a mile south on N1680 Road, it turned east on E1250 Road to Erick, then south again on N1750 Road, east on E1260 Road, south on N1810 Road, and east on E1270 Road to Delhi. Traffic turned north at N1870 Road (now US 283), jogging west on E1250 Road at the mismatch in the section lines, and entered Sayre on N1870 Road. The bridge over the North Fork of the Red River in Sayre was built of timber in 1924 and upgraded and widened with steel in 1933. It was bypassed in 1958, and has been demolished; its remains are on private property. The original US 66 passed through Sayre on Main Street (now SH-152) and Fourth Street, leaving to the east on Benton Boulevard (E1180 Road). It then turned north on N1900 Road, east on E1170 Road (there was a cutoff on the southeast side of the railroad at this turn), north on N1960 Road, east on E1160 Road, and north on N2000 Road into Elk City on Randall Avenue. Short sections of this — a bridge on E1170 Road east of N1950 Road (SH-34) and the crossing of Elk City Lake on N2000 Road — no longer exist.

A new alignment from the state line to Elk City was built in the late 1920s. It only coincided with the earlier route through Texola and through Sayre; the rest was entirely separate. Except in Sayre, where the city had paved the road with Portland cement (PC) in 1926, the state began paving the road in 1928 and 1929 with asphalt over a concrete base from Elk City to several miles east of Hext. It switched to PC in 1929, paving the remainder from east of Hext to the state line from 1929 to 1931. This alignment followed E1240 Road from the state line to Texola, and then the present main road through Erick and Hext to south of Sayre. The old cement lies in the center of the four-lane road through Texola, and then mainly follows the westbound lanes to Erick, through which it again lies in the center. A short abandoned piece of PC, including ruins from a former bridge over a creek, is located to the south of the road, between N1700 and N1710 Roads. Beyond Erick, the PC was again built in the present location of the westbound lanes, but has since been paved over until the I-40 interchange (exit 11). Just past exit 11, the road becomes two lanes, and the original road — mostly built as PC, but later resurfaced in asphalt, and once the westbound lanes of a divided highway - is now abandoned to the north of the open roadway; a 1928 concrete federal aid primary marker lies 0.8 miles (1.3 km) west of Hext. Beyond Hext, where I-40 comes in from the south, the two-lane road crosses to the original roadway; the later eastbound lanes are now the westbound lanes of I-40. The 1929 alignment curved to the north into N1870 Road west of exit 20, following Main Street and Fourth Street as the original route did. However, it continued beyond Benton Boulevard to Sayre Avenue, turning off onto the present four-lane I-40 Bus. towards I-40 exit 25. Just prior to the exit, US 66 curved northeast along the northside frontage road. It crossed to the south side after exit 26, crossing Timber Creek on a 1928 through truss bridge, and crossed again just east of the N1910 Road overpass. This part of the north frontage road, from east of N1910 Road to exit 32, retains the original 1928–1929 paving, as well as a 1926 box drain. Between exit 32 and Elk City, the original road (resurfaced) is now the westbound lanes of I-40 Bus., where another 1926 box drain still stands.

A second set of lanes was added, mostly on the south side of the two-lane road, from 1955 to 1961, except through Texola, Erick, and Sayre, where the existing road was widened to four lanes. The old road was bypassed in several places: west of Texola, where the new road went diagonally northwest to the state line; between N1700 and N1710 Roads, where a straighter alignment was built to the north; entering Sayre from the south, where it continued on what is now the northside frontage road to Fourth Street (effective July 14, 1958); and at Timber Creek, where the two-lane road used the southside frontage road, and both directions of the four-lane road used the present I-40. Between the Sayre and Elk City business loops, except over Timber Creek, the new eastbound lanes are now the eastbound lanes of I-40; further west, between Sayre and Hext, they are the present westbound lanes.

I-40 was completed in its present state in 1966 between Sayre and Elk City; the bypasses of both cities opened in October 1970, with the Sayre bypass project extending west to the point east of Hext where I-40 curves away from the old road. (The relocation here was made on June 1, 1970.) The rest of I-40 west to Texas opened on September 2, 1975. Except for the bypasses around Sayre and Elk City, US 66 was moved to the new I-40; most of it was given to Beckham County, but the old route through Erick, which had overlapped SH-30, became SH-30 Business. When US 66 was decommissioned on April 1, 1985, the Sayre and Elk City business loops were created. I-40 Business through Erick, between exits 5 and 11, replaced SH-30 Bus. in 1987, based on traffic data.

=== Through Oklahoma City ===
US 66 was signed in Oklahoma City by 1929. Its initial routing entered from the west on 39th Street and turned south on Classen Boulevard and east on 23rd Street. SH-7 entered from the south on Robinson Avenue, which also carried SH-4, SH-9, and US 77. At the intersection of 23rd Street and Lincoln Boulevard, just north of the State Capitol, SH-3 and SH-9 continued east, along with US 266, while the other routes, including US 66, turned north. After leaving the city limits, continuing on Lincoln Boulevard (including the present Beverly Drive), it jogged east on Grand Boulevard (now I-44) to reach Kelley Avenue. By 1931, traffic was routed via Western Avenue rather than Classen Boulevard, and a new US 66 Alternate bypassed downtown, turning north rather than south on Western Avenue to Britton and east on Britton Road to Kelley Avenue. By 1935 US 66 used May Avenue rather than Western Avenue; the alternate route continued to use Western Avenue, moving to Classen Boulevard south of 53rd Street on March 18, 1936. The alternate route was eventually moved to May Avenue on May 6, 1947.

On March 2, 1953, about the time the Northwest Expressway, Northeast Expressway, and Turner Turnpike were completed, US 66 was realigned to make use of this bypass. It turned north from 39th Street at May Avenue to reach the expressways, and followed them to Kelley, where it continued to turn north towards Edmond. The continuation of the Northeast Expressway to the Oklahoma City Terminus of the turnpike was labeled SH-66A; this route had extended west to May Avenue before March 2. (SH-3 used the Northwest Expressway west of May Avenue.) The old US 66 through downtown, via May Avenue, 23rd Street, and Lincoln Boulevard, became US 66 Business, and the alternate route was eliminated. A short realignment was made on August 2, 1954, using the new West Expressway from 39th Street and May Avenue to the Northwest Expressway west of Classen Boulevard.

SH-66A became part of US 66 by 1956, when the new road (now I-35) was built from the Turner Turnpike north to US 66 east of Edmond. The old route via Edmond became SH-66 (and SH-77, since it had replaced US 77). The business route was deleted on March 5, 1979, and at about the same time the new route of the West Expressway, bypassing Classen Circle, was completed.

=== Through Tulsa ===
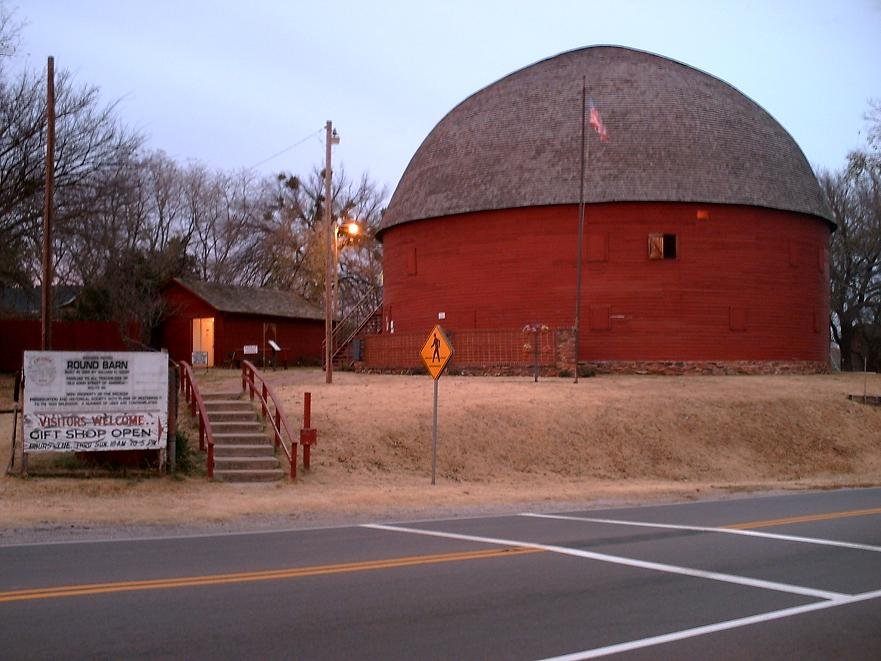
The Round Barn in Arcadia

By 1929, US 66 had been marked through Tulsa, entering from the southwest on Southwest Boulevard (then Quanah Avenue) to the old 11th Street Bridge over the Arkansas River, being a concrete arch bridge from 1916 that is now on the National Register of Historic Places. The route left the bridge on Maybelle Avenue, and turned east on 11th Street, north on Cheyenne Avenue, east on 7th Street, north on Detroit Avenue, east on 2nd Street, north on Lewis Avenue, and east on Admiral Place to the city limits. Outside the city, the original route turned south on Mingo Road and east on 11th Street, turning north on 193rd Avenue to reach Catoosa. A relocation, approved on July 7, 1932, simplified the routing through Tulsa, taking it east on 11th Street all the way from the bridge to 193rd Avenue. (US 75 and SH-11 remained on Admiral Place, the former using the old US 66 alignment through downtown.)

US 66 Bypass was established on June 4, 1951, along the proposed Skelly Drive, which was not finished until the late 1950s, when it became part of I-44. US 66 itself was moved to Skelly Drive on November 3, 1959, and the old route on Southwest Boulevard and 11th Street, west of the Skelly Drive interchange east of downtown, became US 66 Business. (The only change in this route was made in the early 1970s, during construction of I-444, when it was moved to 12th Street west of Denver Avenue.) The business route was eliminated on January 15, 1973, removing all state highways from surface streets in downtown Tulsa, except for a temporary routing of US 64 and SH-51 on 15th Street until the Broken Arrow Expressway was completed.

=== Tulsa to Kansas border ===
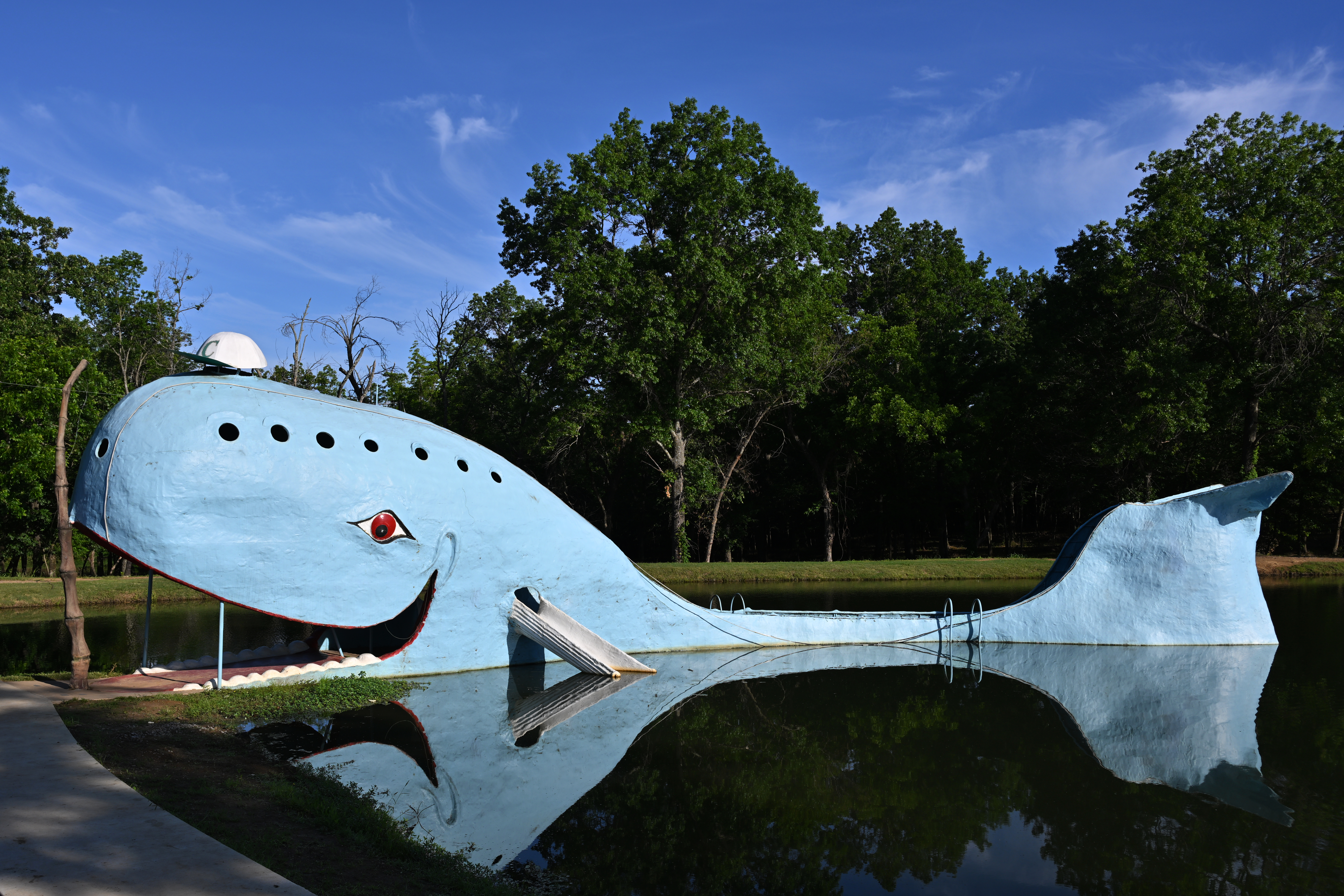
Blue Whale of Catoosa

As with the rest of US 66 in Oklahoma, the majority of this segment follows SH-66, with a number of older alignments that take US 66 through many of the communities along the way. From the northeast side of Tulsa, at the intersection of 193rd Ave and I-44/SH-66, two routes are available, depending on which sources one considers to be official:

- The first route proceeds north on 193rd Ave, crossing under I-44, and turns northeast onto Cherokee St. This route turns east onto Rice St, crosses SH-66, and then turns northeast onto "Old US Highway 66". This road turns north as it joins with 225th St. This road splits into a "Y" just before it intersects with SH-66. Maps indicate that both sides of the "Y" intersect with SH-66, and that the right side of this "Y" leads the traveler to cross SH-66 again, to find an abandoned segment of US 66 on the other side.
- A second route proceeds north on 193rd Ave, past I-44, and turns northeast onto Cherokee St. One then turns hard right onto Antry Dr., then left onto SH-66. The route turns east onto Rice St, then northeast onto "Old US Highway 66", north on 225th St, and then northeast back onto SH-66.

US 66 then follows SH-66 northeast through Verdigris and into Claremore. One may either continue on SH-66 all the way through town, or divert one block west and take the older alignment down J.M Davis Blvd. The route re-joins SH-66 via Stuart Roosa Dr., at the north end of town.

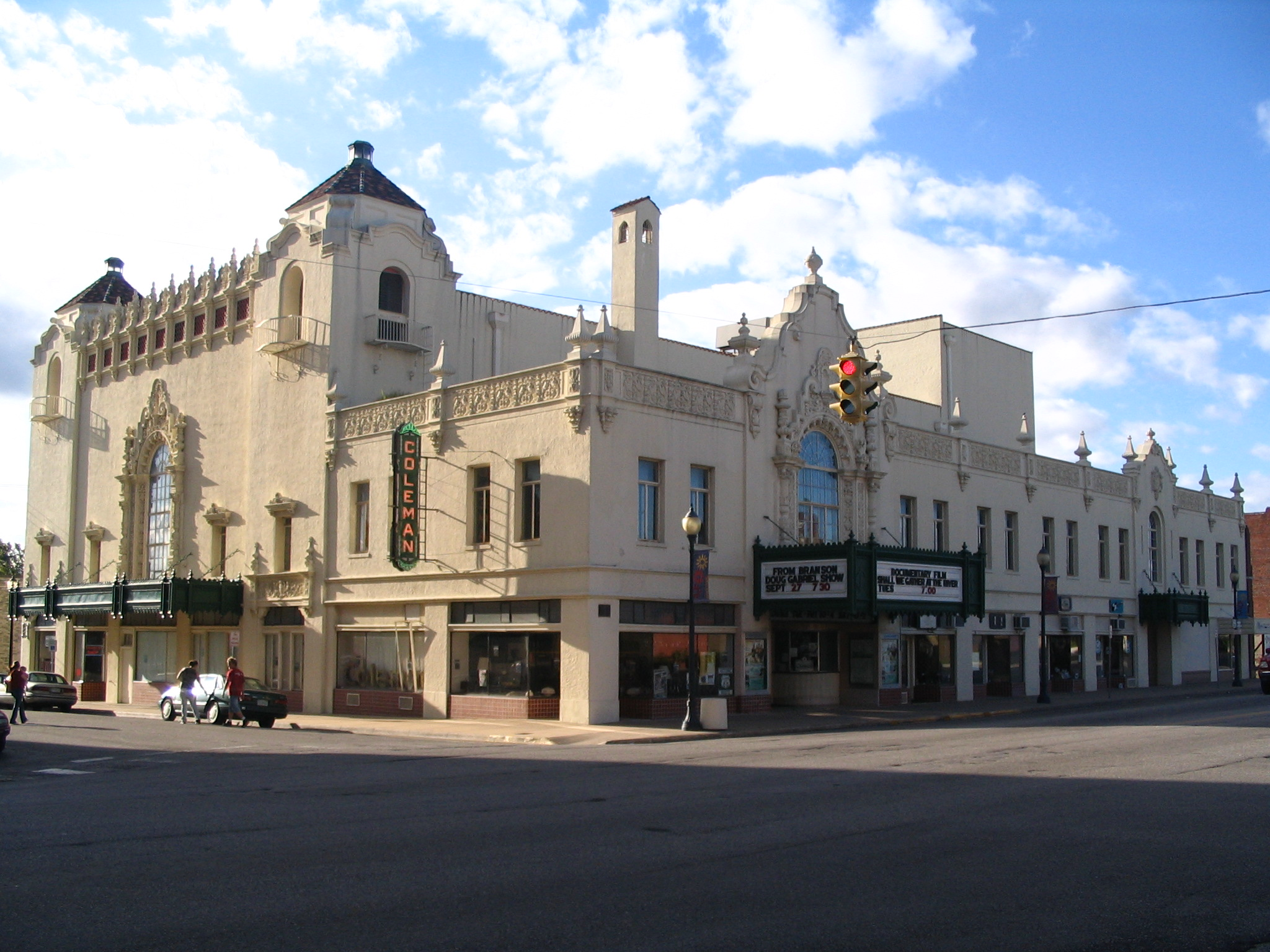
The Coleman Theatre in Miami

US 66 then proceeded north and east via SH-66. Other communities along this stretch of road include Sequoyah, Foyil, and Busyhead. In Chelsea, SH-28 briefly merges with SH-66, then diverges north after about 5 blocks, while SH-66 continues toward White Oak. After White Oak, US 60/US 69 join the route. Just beyond this intersection, SH-2 joins the route as the road continues to Vinita. In the downtown area of Vinita, SH-2 diverges to the north while US 60/US 66/US 69 turn to the right. The highway crosses I-44 just east of the city and intersects with SH-82 and SH-85. At the latter junction, the highway takes a turn to the north and continues through Afton.

Just east of Afton, there are two possible alignments:

- One may turn off to the right onto E 220 Road. This is actually a stretch of the original 9-foot-wide (2.7 m) "sidewalk" highway. The driver would follow the road straight at first, then follow the original roadbed as it curves to the right, avoiding the 90-degree intersection ahead. This joins with S 520 road and intersects with and crosses US 69. One should proceed straight on S 520 Road, crossing US 69 and eventually crossing over I-44. Less than 1 mile (1.6 km) later, the roadbed curves to the east onto 210th road, again avoiding the 90-degree intersection. Less than 1 mile (1.6 km) after this, the sidewalk road becomes regular paved roadway, which then intersects with US 69. At this point, US 66 turns north to follow the main highway.
- Alternatively, one may remain on US 69, bypassing the sidewalk road entirely and continuing northeast. After about 2 miles (3.2 km), US 59 joins the route (about halfway between the two ends of the sidewalk route). At the US 60/US 69/I-44 interchange, US 69 continues north while US 60 diverts east.

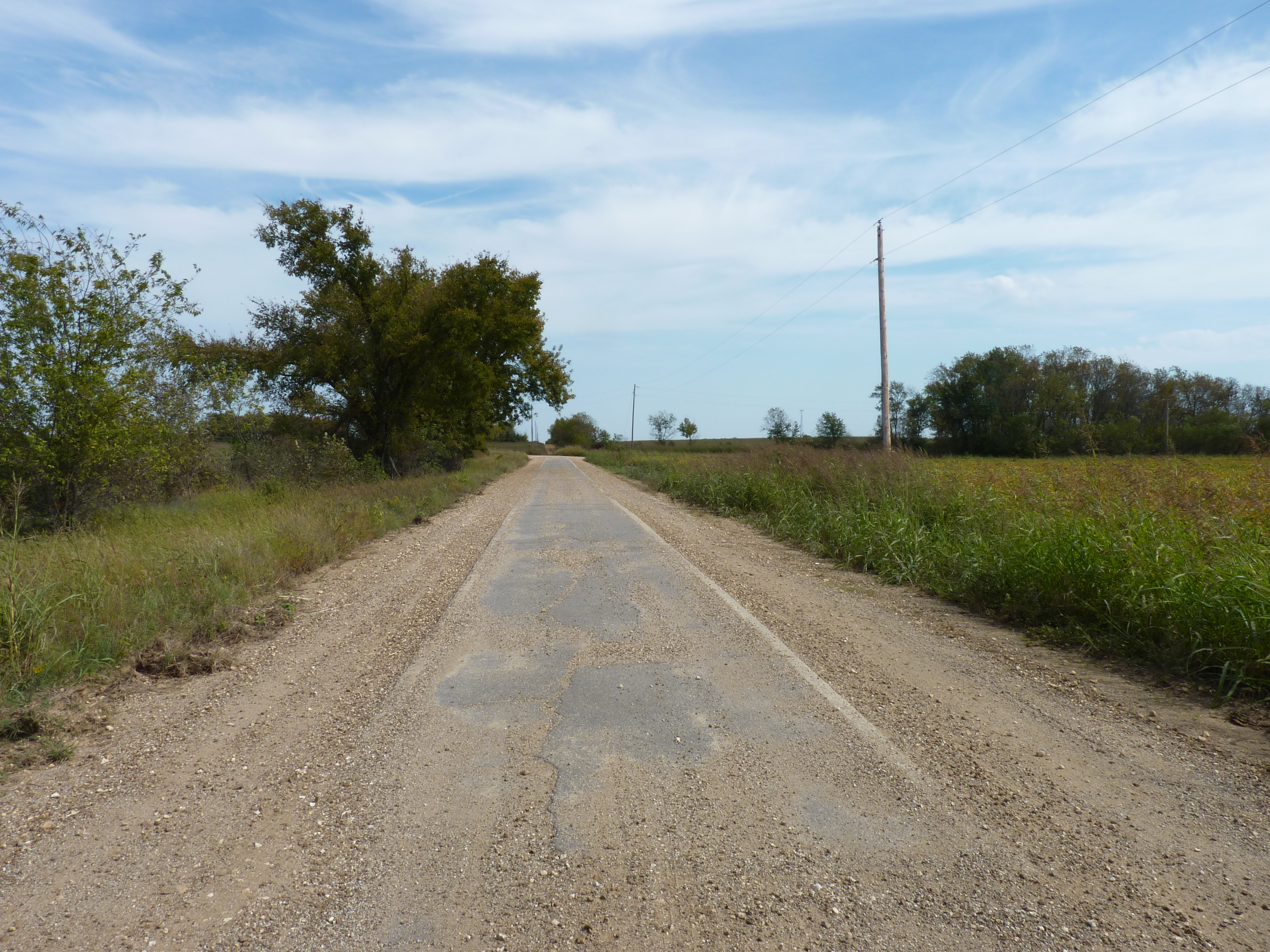
"Sidewalk highway" section of US 66 near Miami

Shortly after Narcissa, another section of the old US 66 alignment is available, again as a stretch of sidewalk highway:

- At 140th road, the original US 66 alignment turns to the right, onto another stretch of sidewalk highway. The roadbed turns north onto 540th road after 1 mile (1.6 km), then east onto 130th road after another mile. After about 1.5 miles (2.4 km), the route turns north onto "E" St. SW. The route continues north through a rural-looking residential area and joins with SH-125 after one mile (1.6 km). After another 1.4 miles (2.3 km), the road bends to the right and crosses the Neosho River, then bends to the left and joins with Main Street in Miami, Oklahoma. The Route continues north through town. Like the stretch of road near Afton, the sidewalk roadbed bends and curves around the corners, avoiding the actual 90-degree intersections entirely.
- Alternatively, one may remain on US 59/US 69, bypassing the sidewalk road. SH-10 joins the route about 3.3 miles (5.3 km) beyond Narcissa, and US 59 diverts to the west at this intersection. US 66/US 69 continues northeast into Miami. At the intersection with Main Street, SH-10 proceeds east, while US 66/US 69 diverges to the north.

US 66/US 69 continues north through Miami. As the highway exits to the north, an alternate alignment becomes available:

- At the intersection with Newman Road, US 69 bends northeast. Just past Newman Road is an exit that takes one back onto Main Street; a sign is currently in place directing travelers to take this exit to remain on US 66. From here, US 66 proceeds north through the "back" side of Commerce, Oklahoma. US 66 turns east at Commerce St. and proceeds through the downtown area of Commerce. US 66 turns north at Mickey Mantle Boulevard to rejoin with US 69.
- Alternatively, one may remain on US 69, bypassing the downtown area of Commerce.

US 66/US 69 bends to the east as it exits the north side of Commerce. About 1.8 miles (2.9 km) after this bend, US 69 diverts to the north. Alternate US 69 begins at this point, and US 66/Alternate 69 continues east, bending north as the highway enters the south end of Quapaw, Oklahoma. The route continues through Quapaw and proceeds northeast beyond the Oklahoma/Kansas state line to Riverton, Kansas, where US 66 splits from alternate 69 and heads eastward as K-66.

== History ==
Ozark Trail
- Location: Texola–Baxter Springs, KS

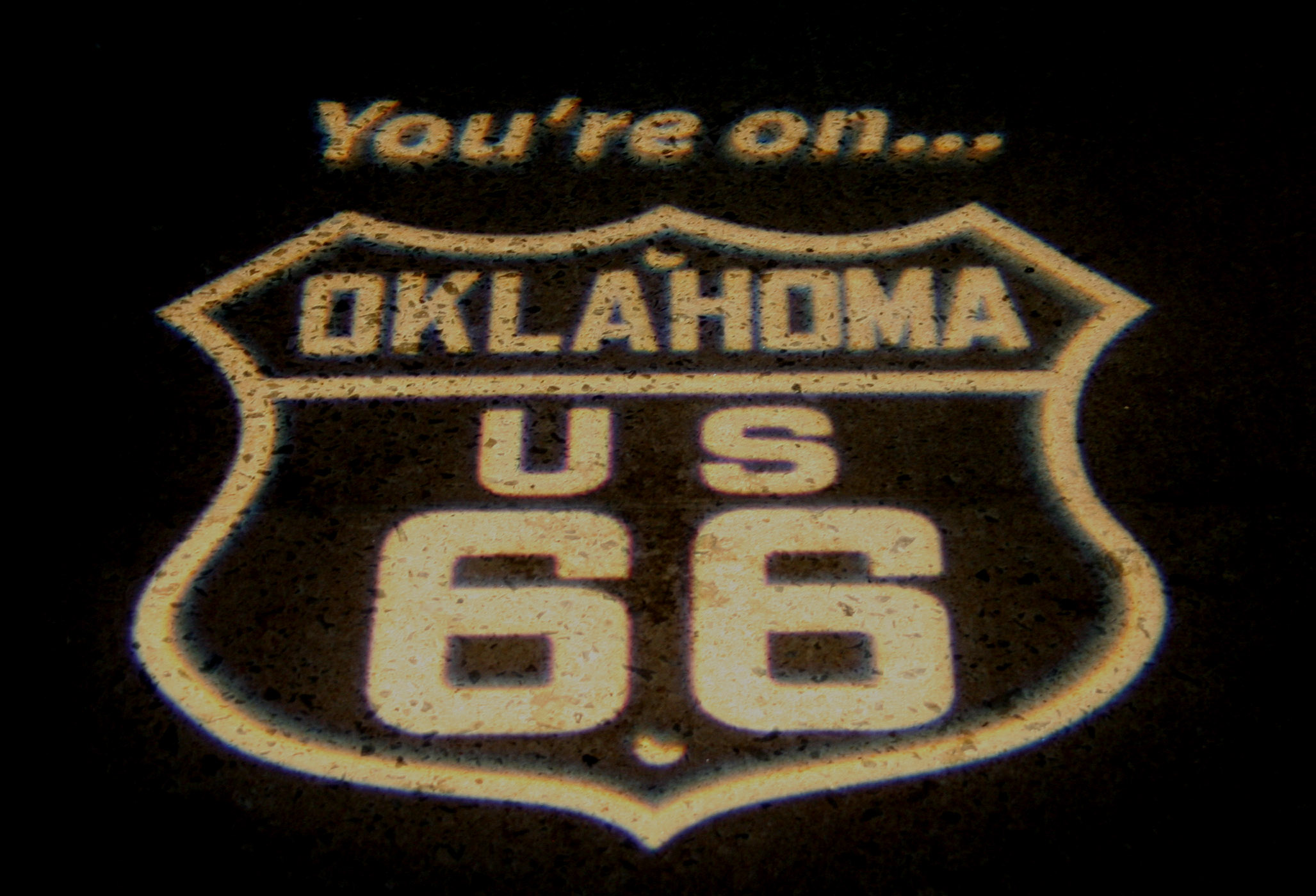
Pavement markings indicating the historic alignment of US 66

The history of US 66 in Oklahoma can be traced back to two auto trails—the St. Louis, Missouri–Las Vegas, New Mexico, main route of the Ozark Trails network, and the Fort Smith, Arkansas–Amarillo, Texas, Postal Highway. In the state highway system, approved in mid-1924, the portions of these in Oklahoma, which crossed at Oklahoma City, became SH-7 and SH-3 respectively. US 66 was designated in late 1926, and followed these state highways with one exception: a new SH-39 was created to carry Route 66, leaving SH-7 at Commerce and heading east and north to the state line in the direction of Baxter Springs, Kansas. (The short stub of SH-7 north of Commerce remained until it became part of US-69 in the mid-1930s.)

Over the years, many portions of Route 66 west of Oklahoma City were replaced with I-40. On the other hand, the Turner Turnpike and Will Rogers Turnpike were built parallel to Route 66 east of Oklahoma City, and Route 66 remained on the old road as a free alternate to the turnpikes. Route 66 was eliminated by the American Association of State Highway and Transportation Officials on April 1, 1985. In Oklahoma, the portions west of Oklahoma City that had not been rerouted onto I-40 became business loops of I-40 through Sayre, Elk City, Clinton, and El Reno. The still-independent route, starting at US-81 in southeastern El Reno, became SH-66, using surface streets except through Oklahoma City and Tulsa, where Route 66 had been rerouted onto the freeways. SH-66 ends at US-60 west of Vinita, where Route 66 overlapped US-60 and US-69 to east of Commerce. The remaining independent portion to the Kansas state line became part of a new US-69 Alternate.

== Major intersections ==
County	Location	mi	km	Destinations	Notes
Beckham		0.0	0.0	US 66 west – Shamrock, Amarillo	Texas state line
Beckham		5.7	9.2	SH-30 south – Hollis	Western end of SH-30 concurrency
Beckham	Erick	7.7	12.4	SH-30 north (Sheb Wooley Street) – Sweetwater	Eastern end of SH-30 concurrency
Beckham		21.3	34.3	US 283 south – Mangum	Western end of US-283 concurrency
Beckham	Sayre	22.9	36.9	SH-41 east – Sweetwater	Western end of SH-41 concurrency
Beckham	Sayre	23.2	37.3	SH-41 east – Cordell	Eastern end of SH-41 concurrency
Beckham	Sayre	24.3	39.1	US 283 north – Cheyenne	Eastern end of US-283 concurrency
Beckham		33.9	54.6	SH-34 south – Mangum	Western end of SH-34 concurrency
Beckham		36.2	58.3	SH-73 west	Western end of SH-34 concurrency
Beckham	Elk City	40.0	64.4	SH-6	
Beckham		42.5	68.4	SH-34 north – Woodward	Eastern end of SH-34 concurrency
Washita		54.5	87.7	SH-44 south – Foss, Burns Flat, Altus	
Custer	Clinton	66.1	106.4	US 183 south (6th Street) – Cordell, Hobart	Western end of US-183 concurrency
Custer	Clinton	68.4	110.1	US 183 north (4th Street)	Eastern end of US-183 concurrency
Custer		82.4	132.6	SH-54 south – Corn, Colony, Mountain View	Western end of SH-54 concurrency
Custer	Weatherford	83.2	133.9	SH-54 north (West Main Street) – Thomas	Eastern end of SH-54 concurrency
Caddo				SH-58 north – Hydro	Western end of SH-58 concurrency
Caddo				SH-58 south – Carnegie	Eastern end of SH-58 concurrency
Caddo	Hinton Junction			US 281 south / SH-8 south – Hinton, Anadarko	Western end of US-281 / SH-8 concurrency
Canadian				US 281 north / SH-8 north – Geary, Watonga	Eastern end of US-281 / SH-8 concurrency
Canadian				US 270 west – Calumet	Western end of US-270 concurrency
Canadian	El Reno			US 81 north (Choctaw Avenue) – Kingfisher	Western end of US-81 concurrency
Canadian	El Reno			US 81 south – Chickasha	Eastern end of US-81 concurrency
Canadian	Yukon			SH-92 south (Garth Brooks Boulevard) – Mustang	
Canadian	Yukon			SH-4 north (Cornwell Drive) – Piedmont	Western end of SH-4 concurrency
Canadian	Yukon			SH-4 south (Ranchwood Boulevard)	Eastern end of SH-4 concurrency
Oklahoma	Warr Acres			SH-3 (North MacArthur Boulevard)	
Oklahoma	Oklahoma City			Grand Boulevard	Interchange; now I-44 west / Lake Hefner Parkway
Oklahoma	Oklahoma City			US 270 / US 66 Bus. / SH-3 / SH-74 (May Avenue)	Eastern end of US-270 concurrency; interchange
Oklahoma	Oklahoma City			Pennsylvania Avenue	interchange
Oklahoma	Oklahoma City			SH-66A west (Northwest Expressway)	At-grade intersection
Oklahoma	Oklahoma City			Classen Boulevard	Classen Circle (traffic circle)
Oklahoma	Oklahoma City			Western Avenue	interchange
Oklahoma	Oklahoma City			Grand Boulevard west	At-grade intersection
Oklahoma	Oklahoma City			US 77 north (Broadway Extension) – Edmond	Western end of US-77 concurrency; now I-235 south; interchange
Oklahoma	Oklahoma City			US 77 south / US 66 Bus. west (Lincoln Boulevard) – Downtown Oklahoma City	Eastern end of US-77 concurrency; interchange
Oklahoma	Oklahoma City			Grand Boulevard east	at-grade intersection
Oklahoma	Oklahoma City			Britton Road	Interchange
Oklahoma	Oklahoma City			Turner Turnpike / Sooner Road – Tulsa	Interchange
Oklahoma	Oklahoma City			Memorial Road	Interchange
Oklahoma	Edmond			US 77 (2nd Street) – Wichita, Edmond	Interchange
see SH-66
Creek				Turner Turnpike – Oklahoma City	
Tulsa	Tulsa			US 169 south – Glenpool	Western end of US-169 concurrency
Tulsa	Tulsa			US 169 north (West 23rd Street)	Eastern end of US-169 concurrency
Tulsa	Tulsa			US 75 north / SH-33 east (Heavy Traffic Way)	Eastern end of US-75 / SH-33 concurrency
Tulsa	Tulsa			US 64 / SH-51 (South Denver Avenue)	
Tulsa	Tulsa			US 169 (South Peoria Avenue)	
Tulsa	Tulsa			SH-11 (South Memorial Drive)	
Tulsa–Wagoner county line				SH-33 west (East Admiral Place)	Western end of SH-33 concurrency
Rogers				SH-33 east – Chouteau, Siloam Springs	Eastern end of SH-33 concurrency; now US-412; interchange
Rogers				Will Rogers Turnpike – Joplin	Interchange
see SH-66
Craig				US 60 west – Nowata, Bartlesville	Western end of US-60 concurrency
Craig				US 69 south – Pryor	Western end of US-69 concurrency
Craig	Vinita			SH-2 north (Wilson Street)	
Craig				Will Rogers Turnpike	
Craig				SH-82 south – Langley	
Delaware				SH-85 south – Bernice	
Ottawa				US 59 south – Grove	Western end of US-59 concurrency
Ottawa				Will Rogers Turnpike / US 60 east – Fairland	Eastern end of US-60 concurrency; interchange
Ottawa				US 59 north / SH-10 west – Welch, Lenapah	Eastern end of US-59 concurrency; western end of SH-10 concurrency
Ottawa	Miami			SH-10 east (Steve Owens Boulevard) / SH-125 south (Main Street) – Seneca, MO, Fairland, Grove	Eastern end of SH-10 concurrency
Ottawa				US 69 north – Picher	Eastern end of US-69 concurrency
Ottawa				SH-137 south	
Ottawa		373	600	US-66 east – St. Louis	Kansas state line
1.000 mi = 1.609 km; 1.000 km = 0.621 mi: Concurrency terminus

== Structures ==
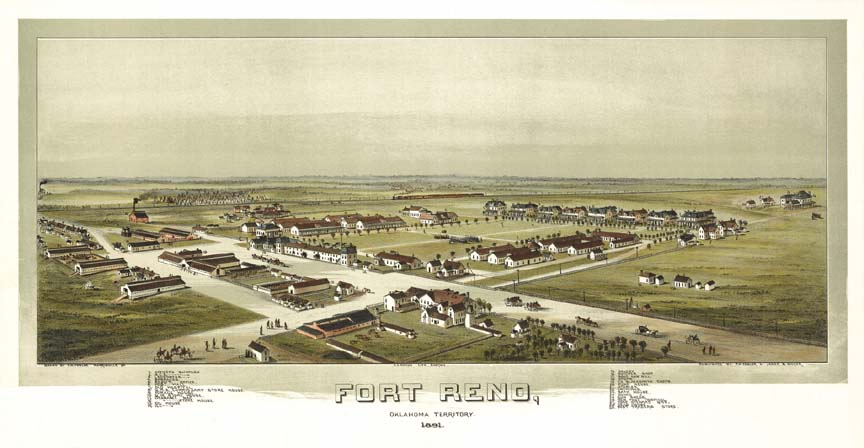
Fort Reno in El Reno, built 1874

US 66 in Oklahoma is home to many National Register of Historic Places sites connected in some way with the historic highway.

Fort Reno served as a US military post from 1874 (long before Oklahoma attained statehood) through World War II. The Chandler Armory, built under the Works Progress Administration during the Great Depression, served as home of the 45th Infantry Division of the Oklahoma National Guard during World War II and continued in service until replaced by a modern building in 1971. It was restored in 2007 as Chandler's Route 66 information site and convention hall.

TeePee Drive-in marquee in August of 2026

Miami's Coleman Theatre, established 1929. has long entertained visitors with everything from live music to cinema. Miami also has the Miami Original Nine-Foot Section of Route 66 Roadbed, which along with the Coleman Theater is on the National Register of Historic Places listings in Ottawa County, Oklahoma. A drive-in theater, The Tee Pee, is located in Sapulpa.

The restored native folk art collection of Ed Galloway's Totem Pole Park in Foyil dates from 1937.

Tulsa landmarks include the giant Meadow Gold neon sign at 11th & Peoria. Originally at 11th & Lewis, this 1934 sign has two 30-by-30-foot (9.1 m × 9.1 m) faces and has been mounted on a pavilion at its new location for visibility.

Arcadia's Round Barn has served as a de facto community hall since 1898. The distinctive large dome of the Beckham County Courthouse has stood over downtown Sayre since 1911. McLain Rogers Park, constructed as a Clinton city park as part of a Great Depression Federal Emergency Relief Administration, the Civil Works Administration, and the Works Progress Administration joint project, includes playgrounds, tennis and volleyball courts, miniature golf, picnic areas, a baseball field and a bandstand.

Rock Creek Bridge No. 18 w/period-appropriate pickup truck, August 2026

Various Oklahoma road segments are of historical importance, including the 11th Street Arkansas River Bridge in Tulsa, the Lake Overholser Bridge in Oklahoma City and the Bridge No. 18 at Rock Creek (which has been restored for pedestrians and is the centerpiece of a park) in Sapulpa.

=== Restaurants, stores and motels ===
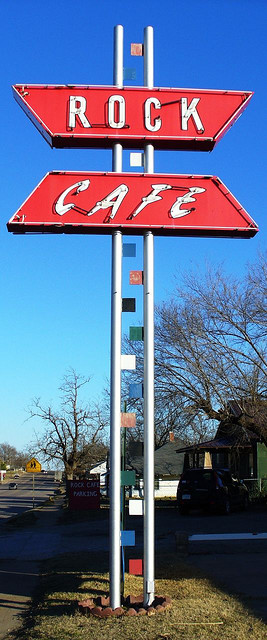
Rock Café in Stroud

The 1939 sandstone Rock Café contains a large collection of both local memorabilia and souvenirs from Disney/Pixar's research of US 66 in the area for the animated film franchise Cars. Proprietor Dawn Welch is the model on which Sally Carrera, the Radiator Springs hotelier who fights to rebuild and restore the town, is based.

A Milk Bottle Grocery occupies a tiny corner of Oklahoma City, Oklahoma near the Gold Dome, its small building overshadowed by a huge milk bottle constructed as an advertisement on the store's roof.

A 66-foot-tall neon roadside sign in the shape of a soda pop bottle marks Pops restaurant in Arcadia. Pops is a modern attraction situated near the Arcadia round barn.

The Chelsea Motel in Chelsea and West Winds Motel in Erick, once lured many weary travellers from US 66 but lost their clientele when the road was bypassed. Both are still extant but have been converted to other uses; they are no longer open to the public.

=== Filling stations ===
Lucille Hamons operated the Provine Service Station near Hydro, Oklahoma from 1941 until her death in 2000, earning the title "Mother of the Mother Road" for her widely reputed generosity to travellers during hard economic times. After the freeway bypassed the site, the Interstate highway passed directly in front of old Route 66 and the Hamons' Court but was separated by a fence and provided no easy access to the site as the only off-ramps were in Hydro and Weatherford.

Other historic stations which remain on US 66 in Oklahoma include Avant's Cities Service Station and Jackson Conoco Service Station in El Reno, Oklahoma, a Marathon Station in Miami, the Seaba Station in Warwick, the Threatt Filling Station in Luther, the Vickery Phillips 66 Station in Tulsa and the Y Service Station and Café in Clinton.

=== Museums and monuments ===
The National Route 66 Museum in Elk City, Oklahoma, is operated by the Elk City Chamber of Commerce. It includes history and displays about all eight states through which Route 66 runs, from Illinois to California. The Route 66 museum is part of the larger Old Town Museum Complex which showcases pioneer life in western Oklahoma.

The Oklahoma Route 66 Museum in Clinton was built on land donated by the late Walter S. Mason Jr., a retired country veterinarian who once served as president of the Best Western hotel chain. It is designed to display the iconic ideas, images, and myths of the Mother Road.

Tulsa, Oklahoma, has The Cyrus Avery Centennial Plaza, located next to the east entrance of the historic 11th Street Bridge. The bridge was one of the large motivating factors in building the Route through Tulsa, avoiding having to build another bridge over the Arkansas. The Plaza contains a giant sculpture weighing 20,000 pounds (9,100 kg) and costing $1.178 million called "East Meets West" of the Avery family riding west in a Model T Ford meeting an eastbound horse-drawn carriage. In 2020, Avery Plaza Southwest opened at the west end of the bridge, which features a “neon park” with replicas of the neon signs from Tulsa-area Route 66 motels of the era, including the Tulsa Auto Court, the Oil Capital Motel, and the famous bucking-bronco sign of the Will Rogers Motor Court. Other future plans for that area include a Route 66 Museum. Tulsa has also installed "Route 66 Rising," a 70' by 30' sculpture on the road's former eastern approach to town at East Admiral Place and Mingo Road. On Southwest Boulevard, between W. 23rd and W. 24th Streets there is a granite marker dedicated to Route 66 as the Will Rogers Highway which features an image of namesake Will Rogers together with information on the route from Michael Wallis, author of Route 66: The Mother Road; and, at Howard Park just past W. 25th Street, three Indiana limestone pillars are dedicated to Route 66 through Tulsa, with Route 66 #1 devoted to Transportation, Route 66 #2 devoted to Tulsa Industry and Native American Heritage, and Route 66 #3 devoted to Art Deco Architecture and American Culture. At 3770 Southwest Blvd. is the Route 66 Historical Village, which includes a tourism information center modeled after a 1920s-1930s gas station, and other period-appropriate artifacts such as the Frisco 4500 steam locomotive with train cars. Elsewhere, Tulsa has constructed twenty-nine historical markers scattered along the 26-mile route of the highway through Tulsa, containing tourist-oriented stories, historical photos, and a map showing the location of historical sites and the other markers. The markers are mostly along the highway's post-1932 alignment down 11th Street, with some along the road's 1926 path down Admiral Place.

Heart of Route 66 Auto Museum during construction of a large addition, 8-2026

Just west of Tulsa in Sapulpa is the Heart of Route 66 Auto Museum which opened in August 2016 in an Armory built in 1948. It features the world's tallest replica of an antique visible gas pump, being 66 feet in height. The globe was placed on top and lights turned on July 20, 2017.

The Afton Station Packard Museum in Afton is a former filling station restored as a privately owned museum, offering souvenirs and Route 66 information.

The Robert Whitebird Cultural Center offers interpretive information and displays on the historic Quapaw Indian Village which used to operate in Quapaw, OK, which featured tribal citizens and also on the importance and history of the route in the local area.

A Memorial Museum to Will Rogers is located in Claremore, Oklahoma, while his Birthplace Ranch is maintained in Oologah, Oklahoma.

U.S. Route 66
Previous state: Texas	Oklahoma	Next state: Kansas
