= Stroud, Oklahoma =

City in Oklahoma, US

- City
- 100th Anniversary Route 66 mural, as seen in November of 2026
- Motto: "Oklahoma Winery Grape Capitol"
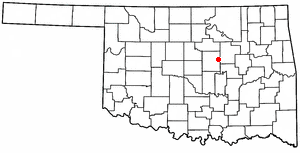
- Location of Stroud, Oklahoma
- Coordinates: 35°46′06″N 96°38′47″W
- Country: United States
- State: Oklahoma
- Counties: Lincoln, Creek

Area
  - Total: 12.70 sq mi (32.90 km^{2})
  - Land: 11.63 sq mi (30.12 km^{2})
  - Water: 1.07 sq mi (2.78 km^{2})
- Elevation: 840 ft (260 m)

Population (2020)
  - Total: 2,719
  - Density: 233.8/sq mi (90.27/km^{2})
- Time zone: UTC-6 (Central (CST))
  - Summer (DST): UTC-5 (CDT)
- ZIP Code: 74079
- Area codes: 539/918
- FIPS code: 40-71000
- GNIS feature ID: 2411990
- Website: cityofstroud.com

Stroud is a city in Creek and Lincoln counties in the U.S. state of Oklahoma. As of the 2020 census, Stroud had a population of 2,719.

== History ==
Stroud was founded in 1892 and named for James W. Stroud, a developer. Early in its history, Stroud lay in Oklahoma Territory, where alcoholic drinks could be sold legally. Towns close to the boundary between Oklahoma Territory and Indian Territory were known as "whiskey towns," and had a reputation as a "wild" town due to its many saloons and other businesses catering to thirsty cowboys and travelers arriving from "dry" Indian Territory. These days were short-lived, however, because Oklahoma statehood in 1907, forced Stroud to become "dry" as well.

In 1901, after a race riot, Stroud became a sundown town, with a prominent sign warning African Americans not to stay overnight.

During the first decade of the 20th century, Stroud's economy was based on cotton farming in the surrounding countryside. The population at statehood was 1,312. By 1909, Stroud had two banks, two newspapers, four cotton gins, and a cottonseed-oil mill, but the 1910 census showed population declined to 1,220.

On March 27, 1915 Stroud became the victim of a legendary outlaw: "Henry Starr, along with six other men, decided to rob two banks at the same time... The [Stroud] robbery would prove... disastrous for Henry Starr. Proceeding to rob the Stroud National Bank and the First National Bank, word of the holdup spread quickly and the citizens took up arms against the bandits. Henry and another outlaw named Lewis Estes were wounded and captured in the gun battle. The rest of the gang escaped with $5815...". Henry was sentenced to prison at the Oklahoma State Penitentiary, but was paroled after serving only four years.

The town became quiet until about 1926 when U.S. Route 66 was built. When construction of the highway was completed, Stroud became a rest stop with amenities such as motels, gas stations and restaurants. The Rock Café, built during the Great Depression using local sandstone removed during the construction of Route 66, operated 24 hours a day during its 1950s heyday. Business diminished after the Turner Turnpike diverted cross-country traffic from the town's main street.

Stroud was devastated by the 1999 Oklahoma tornado outbreak, which destroyed the town's 53-store Tanger Outlet Center, as well as a distribution center owned by foodservice company Sygma. Neither of these facilities were rebuilt; the resulting loss of 800 jobs caused a significant amount of economic distress to the town.

Stroud's famous Rock Cafe, 11-2026

In 2001, Pixar crews visited to research US 66 for the animated film Cars, at a time when the town economy was still attempting to recover from the 1999 tornado, and the Rock Café was undergoing historic restoration. The character of Radiator Springs hotelier Sally Carrera is heavily based on Rock Café proprietor Dawn Welch and her efforts to promote and rebuild the town. A fire gutted the restaurant on May 20, 2008 but the grill and the original stone walls survived. The Rock Café was rebuilt by historic preservationist David Burke; Dawn Welch reopened the business on May 29, 2009.

In downtown Stroud, November of 2026

== Geography ==
Stroud Lake, located approximately 3 miles (4.8 km) northeast of the city, offers recreational opportunities and is also the location of the Wilderness Challenge Center of the Oklahoma Foundation for the Disabled. According to the United States Census Bureau, the city has a total area of 12.5 square miles (32.3 km^{2}), of which 11.5 square miles (29.8 km^{2}) is land and 1.0 square mile (2.6 km^{2}) (7.93%) is water.

== Demographics ==
Historical population
Census	Pop.	Note	%±
1900	800		—
1910	1,220		52.5%
1920	1,361		11.6%
1930	1,894		39.2%
1940	1,917		1.2%
1950	2,450		27.8%
1960	2,456		0.2%
1970	2,502		1.9%
1980	3,148		25.8%
1990	2,666		−15.3%
2000	2,758		3.5%
2010	2,690		−2.5%
2020	2,719		1.1%
U.S. Decennial Census

The bulk of the city is in Lincoln County, part of the Oklahoma City metropolitan area. A sliver in the east is in Creek County, part of the Tulsa metropolitan area.

=== 2020 census ===
As of the 2020 census, Stroud had a population of 2,719. The median age was 38.2 years, with 24.2% of residents under the age of 18 and 18.6% 65 years of age or older. For every 100 females there were 90.4 males, and for every 100 females age 18 and over there were 86.9 males age 18 and over.

0% of residents lived in urban areas, while 100.0% lived in rural areas.

There were 1,082 households in Stroud, of which 33.9% had children under the age of 18 living in them. Of all households, 45.6% were married-couple households, 17.0% were households with a male householder and no spouse or partner present, and 30.2% were households with a female householder and no spouse or partner present. About 27.7% of all households were made up of individuals and 15.3% had someone living alone who was 65 years of age or older.

There were 1,246 housing units, of which 13.2% were vacant. Among occupied housing units, 61.8% were owner-occupied and 38.2% were renter-occupied. The homeowner vacancy rate was 1.9% and the rental vacancy rate was 14.1%.

Racial composition as of the 2020 census
Race	Percent
White	75.9%
Black or African American	2.6%
American Indian and Alaska Native	8.6%
Asian	0.6%
Native Hawaiian and Other Pacific Islander	0%
Some other race	1.3%
Two or more races	11.0%
Hispanic or Latino (of any race)	3.6%

=== 2000 census ===
As of the census of 2000, there were 2,758 people, 1,139 households, and 731 families residing in the city. The population density was 239.9 inhabitants per square mile (92.6/km^{2}). There were 1,325 housing units at an average density of 115.3 per square mile (44.5/km^{2}). The racial makeup of the city was 83.72% White, 3.66% African American, 8.45% Native American, 0.54% Asian, 0.47% from other races, and 3.15% from two or more races. Hispanic or Latino of any race were 1.45% of the population.

There were 1,139 households, out of which 30.2% had children under the age of 18 living with them, 49.3% were married couples living together, 11.6% had a female householder with no husband present, and 35.8% were non-families. 32.2% of all households were made up of individuals, and 18.2% had someone living alone who was 65 years of age or older. The average household size was 2.36 and the average family size was 3.00.

In the city, the population was spread out, with 25.5% under the age of 18, 8.0% from 18 to 24, 24.9% from 25 to 44, 22.0% from 45 to 64, and 19.7% who were 65 years of age or older. The median age was 39 years. For every 100 females, there were 87.5 males. For every 100 females age 18 and over, there were 82.5 males.

The median income for a household in the city was $27,222, and the median income for a family was $31,742. Males had a median income of $26,076 versus $18,250 for females. The per capita income for the city was $15,010. About 12.3% of families and 17.6% of the population were below the poverty line, including 24.6% of those under age 18 and 14.8% of those age 65 or over.

Downtown Stroud w/restored soda ad, November 2026

== Economy ==
Currently, Stroud is enjoying recovery due to increased economic activity in the oil and gas sectors, and is home to Service King, a manufacturer of oilfield workover rigs. Additionally, tourism and agriculture contribute to the local economy, including the emergence of locally produced wines, and affiliated businesses. International tourists are frequently found travelling historic U.S. 66, the main street of Stroud's downtown area. Stroud continues to exploit its location as the centerpoint between Oklahoma City and Tulsa. The city also owns Stroud Midway Industrial Park.

The Sac and Fox national headquarters is located about 5 miles (8.0 km) south of the city and is one of the area's largest employers.

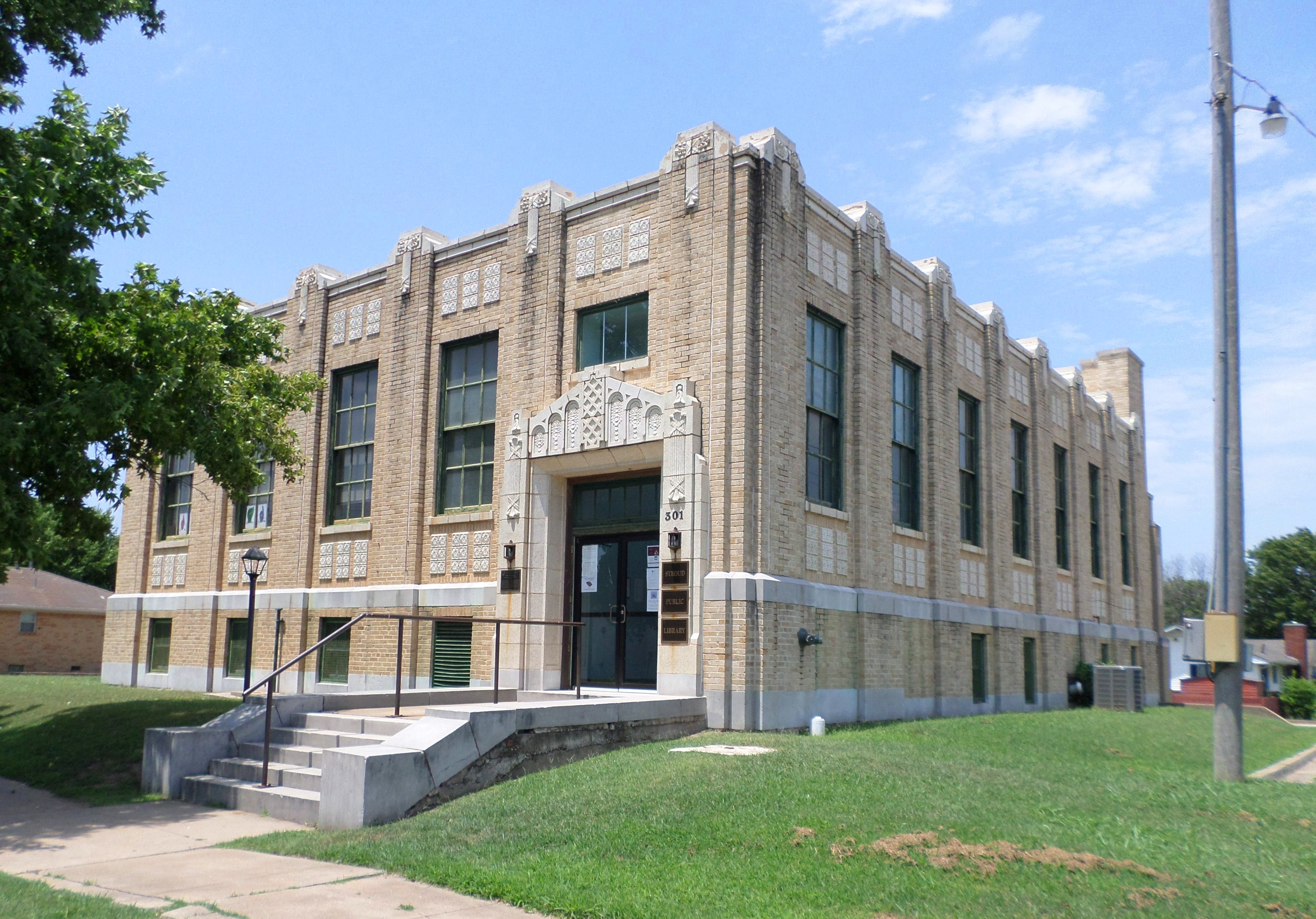
Stroud Public Library, in the NRHP-listed Southwestern Bell Telephone Building

== Arts and culture ==
Several Stroud locations are listed on the National Register of Historic Places.

Stroud High School, November 2026

== Education ==
Stroud Public Schools consist of Stroud High School, Stroud Middle School, and Parkview Elementary. Next to the High School is Stroud Route 66 Coliseum, a 57,000 square foot three-level gymnasium facility.

== Government ==
Stroud has a city manager-council form of government.

== Notable people ==
- Thomas G. Andrews lived in Stroud while serving as City Attorney and subsequently as Lincoln County Attorney.
- Kevin Bookout professional basketball player
- Bobby Riley football player

== Twin cities ==
- Stroud, Gloucestershire, UK

== See also ==
- List of sundown towns in the United States
- Joseph Carpenter House
- Rock Café
- Ozark Trails Section of Route 66
