= Kevin Bookout =

American basketball player (born 1983)

Personal information
- Born: March 16, 1983 (age 43) Stroud, Oklahoma
- Listed height: 6 ft 8 in (2.03 m)
- Listed weight: 265 lb (120 kg)

Career information
- High school: Stroud (Stroud, Oklahoma)
- College: Oklahoma (2002–2006)
- NBA draft: 2006: undrafted
- Position: Power forward

Career history
- 2007: Rio Grande Valley Vipers

Career highlights
- Second-team Parade All-American (2002)

Kevin Bookout (born March 16, 1983) is an American former professional basketball player. Born in Stroud, Oklahoma, he attended Stroud High School where he competed in basketball, baseball, shot put and discus. He played college basketball for the Oklahoma Sooners as he wanted to attend a college with quality basketball and track-and-field programs. While with the Sooners basketball team, Bookout scored 1,018 points and pulled in 682 rebounds. He also participated on the track team and appeared in the 2007 NCAA finals in shot put.

Bookout aspired to earn a spot on the United States shot put team for the 2008 Olympics but delayed his efforts until the 2012 Olympics. He instead played basketball professionally with the Rio Grande Valley Vipers in 2007.

Bookout worked out for the New York Jets of the National Football League (NFL) in 2012.
