= Walter S. Mason Jr. =

American veterinarian and hotelier

- Born: October 4, 1920
- Died: June 1, 2007 (aged 86)
- Monuments: Dr. Walter S. Mason, Jr. Memorial Highway
- Occupations: veterinarian, hotelier
- Employer: Tradewinds Courtyard Inn (1964–2003)
- Organization: Best Western
- Known for: Former president of Best Western (1984)
- Board member of: Friends of Oklahoma Route 66 Museum (1995–96)
- Spouse: Velma
- Children: 3

Walter S. Mason Jr. (October 4, 1920 - June 1, 2007), a Clinton, Oklahoma rural veterinarian turned U.S. Route 66 hotelier, was a former head of the Best Western hotel chain.

In 1955, governor-elect Raymond Gary named Mason (Col '45) as vice-chairman of the State Board of Affairs; he served seven years (1970–76) as an appointed member of the Oklahoma Industrial Development and Park Commission. He became president of Best Western International in 1984.

As owner of the Tradewinds Courtyard Inn from 1963 until 2003, he hosted Elvis Presley during his travels from Memphis to Las Vegas and Hollywood and was one of many Route 66 businesspeople interviewed in 2001 by Pixar as research for the 2006 animated film Cars.

When Interstate 40 in Oklahoma was proposed as a bypass to route 66, Mason advocated the new road follow a route close to the town, preventing Clinton from becoming a ghost town like many other bypassed communities on US 66. A close friend of Route 66 historian and author Michael Wallis (who brought Pixar's John Lasseter, Jonas Rivera, Joe Ranft, Matthew Lo and Kevin Reher to town), he served on the Friends of Oklahoma Route 66 Museum board and donated land for construction of the 1995 museum.

Under Mason's ownership, the two-story, 76-room hotel was a member of Best Western and provided room service, a restaurant and a swimming pool. Suite 215 was furnished in the 1960s style to match the Elvis Presley era. Mason was always quick to tell a story and offer fresh red apples to every guest.

A member of Clinton's local Masonic Lodge since 1949, Mason sold the Tradewinds Courtyard in 2003 and died in June 2007 after a long illness with Alzheimer's disease. After his demise the Tradewinds went into a steep decline, losing its Best Western membership and receiving many highly negative reviews.

In 2011, Oklahoma's state legislature designated a one-mile section of Interstate 40 in Clinton as the Dr. Walter S. Mason Jr. Memorial Highway.
