= Stroud Lake (Oklahoma) =

- Location within Oklahoma Location within the United States
- Coordinates: 35.812°N 96.603°W
- Type: Reservoir
- Etymology: City of Stroud, Oklahoma
- Designation: Reservoir
- First flooded: 1968
- Surface area: 621 acres (2,510,000 m^{2})
- Max. depth: 46.9 feet (14.3 m)
- Water volume: 8,800 acre-feet (10,900,000 m^{3})
- Shore length^{1}: 14.2 miles (22.9 km)
- Surface elevation: 855 feet (261 m)
- Settlements: Stroud, Oklahoma
- ^{1} Shore length is not a well-defined measure.

Stroud Lake is a reservoir in Creek County, Oklahoma, United States, about 4.6 miles (7.4 km) from Stroud, Oklahoma. According to AnglerHub, the lake was built in 1968.

The lake was formally named "Salt Camp Creek Watershed Dam No. 12" when it was under construction. (Note: The dam and much of the lake lie in Creek County, but the rest of the lake lies in Lincoln County, Oklahoma.) The project was built by the City of Stroud and the Creek County Conservation District, assisted by the Oklahoma Conservation Commission and the USDA Natural Resources Conservation Service (NRCS) Watershed Protection and Flood Prevention Program. Although the lake's primary purpose was for flood control, the City of Stroud paid for an additional 4,600 acre-feet (5,700,000 m^{3}) of municipal water storage and 4,200 acre-feet (5,200,000 m^{3}) of recreational water storage above that required for flood control.

== Lake description ==
Oklahoma Water Resources Board (OWRB) says that Stroud Lake, which was created by damming Lincoln Creek, has a surface area of 600 acres (240 ha), a capacity of 8,800 acre-feet (10,900,000 m^{3}), a shoreline of 14 miles (23 km), and a normal elevation of 855 feet (261 m). The lake was built primarily to serve the following functions: water supply, flood control and recreation.
