= Y Service Station and Cafe =

- U.S. National Register of Historic Places
- Location: 1733 Neptune Dr., Clinton, Oklahoma
- Coordinates: 35°28′57″N 98°58′47″W
- Area: less than one acre
- Built: 1937
- Architectural style: Mission/spanish Revival
- MPS: Route 66 and Associated Resources in Oklahoma AD MPS
- NRHP reference No.: 04000523
- Added to NRHP: May 27, 2004

The Y Service Station and Cafe, at 1733 Neptune Dr. in Clinton, Oklahoma, was built in 1937. It was listed on the National Register of Historic Places in 2004.

It occupies a triangular property where Neptune Road splits in a "Y" with Route 66 diverging to the north and U.S. Highway 183 diverging to the south of the property.

A motel located to the south was destroyed in 1991 or 1992.
