= Pops 66 =

Restaurant in Arcadia, Oklahoma, US on Route 66

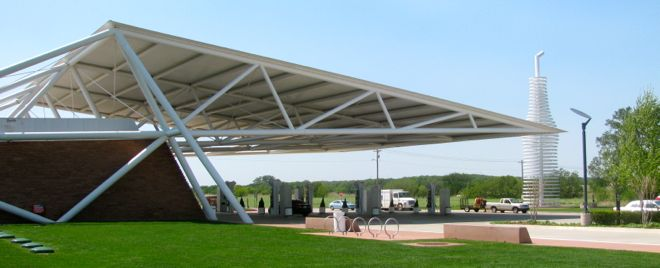
- The cantilever roof extending over the forecourt.

- Location within Oklahoma

Restaurant information
- Established: August 6, 2007
- Owner: Jesse & Zar Sandhu
- Previous owner: Aubrey McClendon
- Food type: American
- Dress code: Casual
- Location: 660 W. Route 66, Arcadia, Oklahoma County, Oklahoma
- Coordinates: 35.658608°N 97.335134°W
- Other locations: Will Rogers World Airport; Nichols Hills, Oklahoma
- Website: pops66.com

Pops "Giant Soda Bottle"
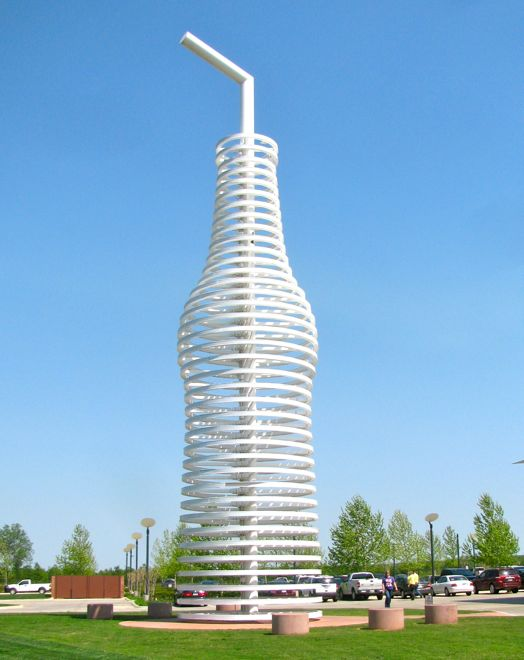
- Giant Soda Bottle at day
- Interactive map of Pops "Giant Soda Bottle"
- Type: Roadside attraction
- Location: Arcadia, Oklahoma

History
- Built: 2007

Site notes
- Height: 66 feet (20 m)
- Architect: Rand Elliott
- Website: route66.com/38.0.html

Pops 66 restaurant in Arcadia, Oklahoma is a modern roadside attraction, gas station, and restaurant on Route 66. Using a theme of soda pop, it is marked by a giant neon sign in the shape of a soda pop bottle. The glass walls of the restaurant are decorated with shelves of over 700 different types of soda pop bottles, arranged by beverage color. Many of the bottles are rare or otherwise difficult to obtain. Many bottles are available for purchase inside with some available cold from the huge refrigerator at the western end.

== History ==
Opened in 2007, the restaurant's structure incorporates a cantilevered truss extending 100 feet over the gas pumps and parking area in the forecourt.

The roadside sign is 66 feet tall and weighs 4 tons. The height is a reference to the historic highway beside which it is situated. Although apparently constructed from neon tubes, it is actually lit by LEDs, which provide a spectacular light show each night.

The establishment was owned by the late Oklahoman oil and gas magnate Aubrey McClendon and was designed by the noted architecture firm Elliott + Associates Architects. Pops has won several architectural awards.

In 2011 two Pops gift shop locations opened in the Will Rogers World Airport in Oklahoma City. In 2016 another Pops was opened in Nichols Hills, Oklahoma incorporating the idea of the original location, but with a modern design. Although the glass walls were also decorated with shelves of bottles, arranged by color, bottles were only for sale from the refrigerator. Unlike the first location, this location also featured a wide variety of candy and sweets. The Nichols Hills location closed in December 2018.

== Gallery ==
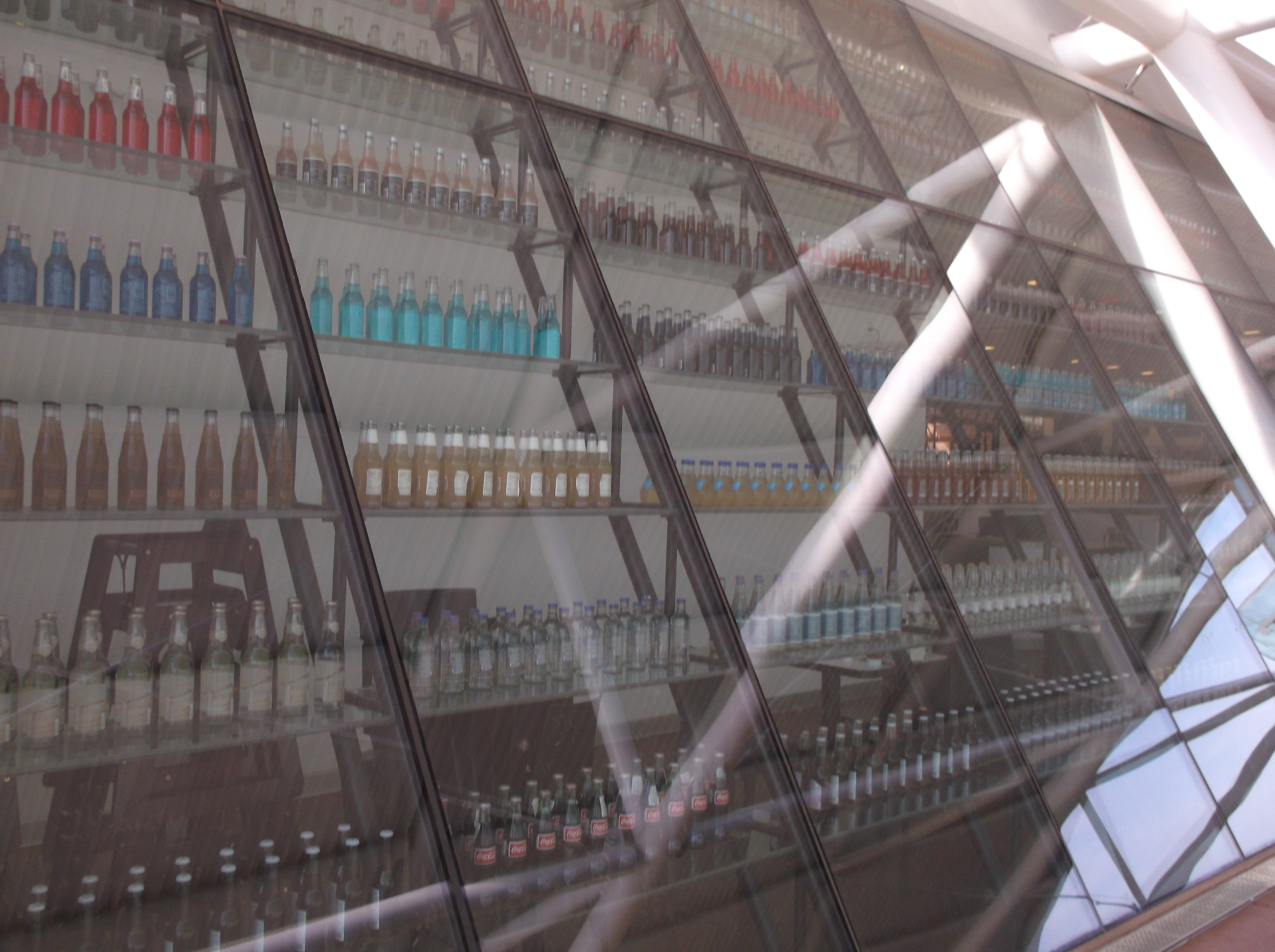
Bottle Wall at Pops in Arcadia from the outside

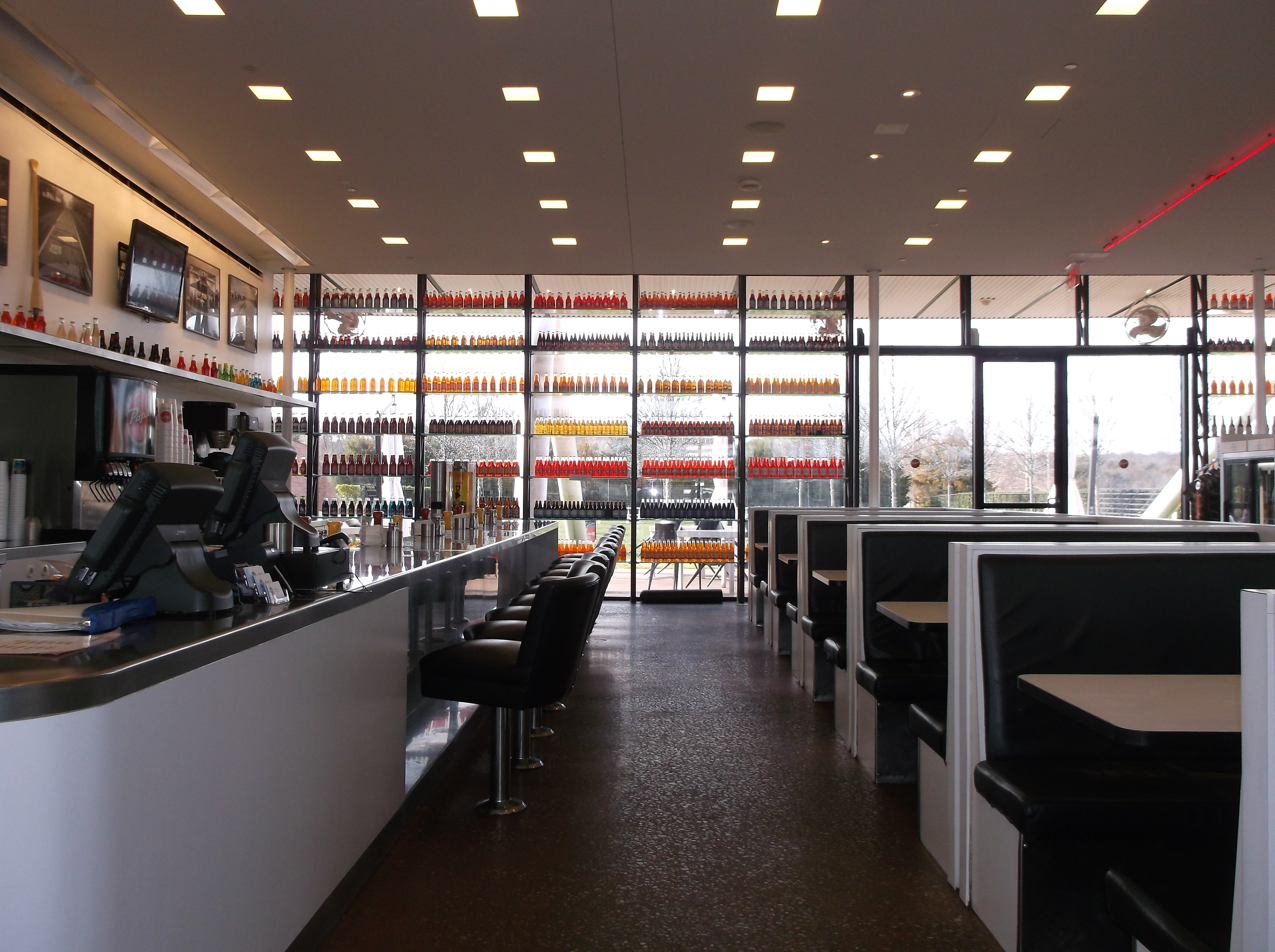
Pops 66 in Arcadia interior

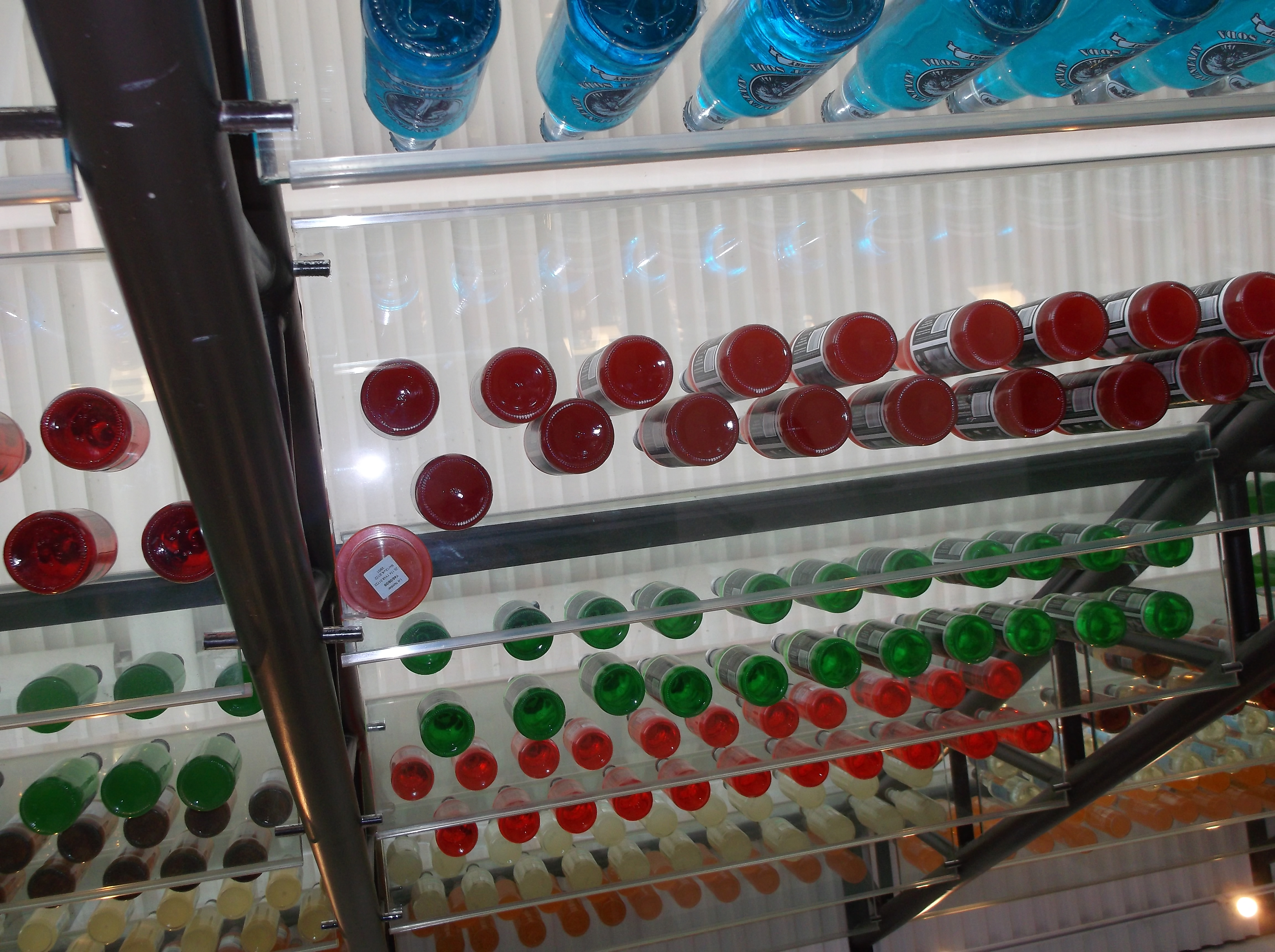
Bottle Wall at Pops in Arcadia

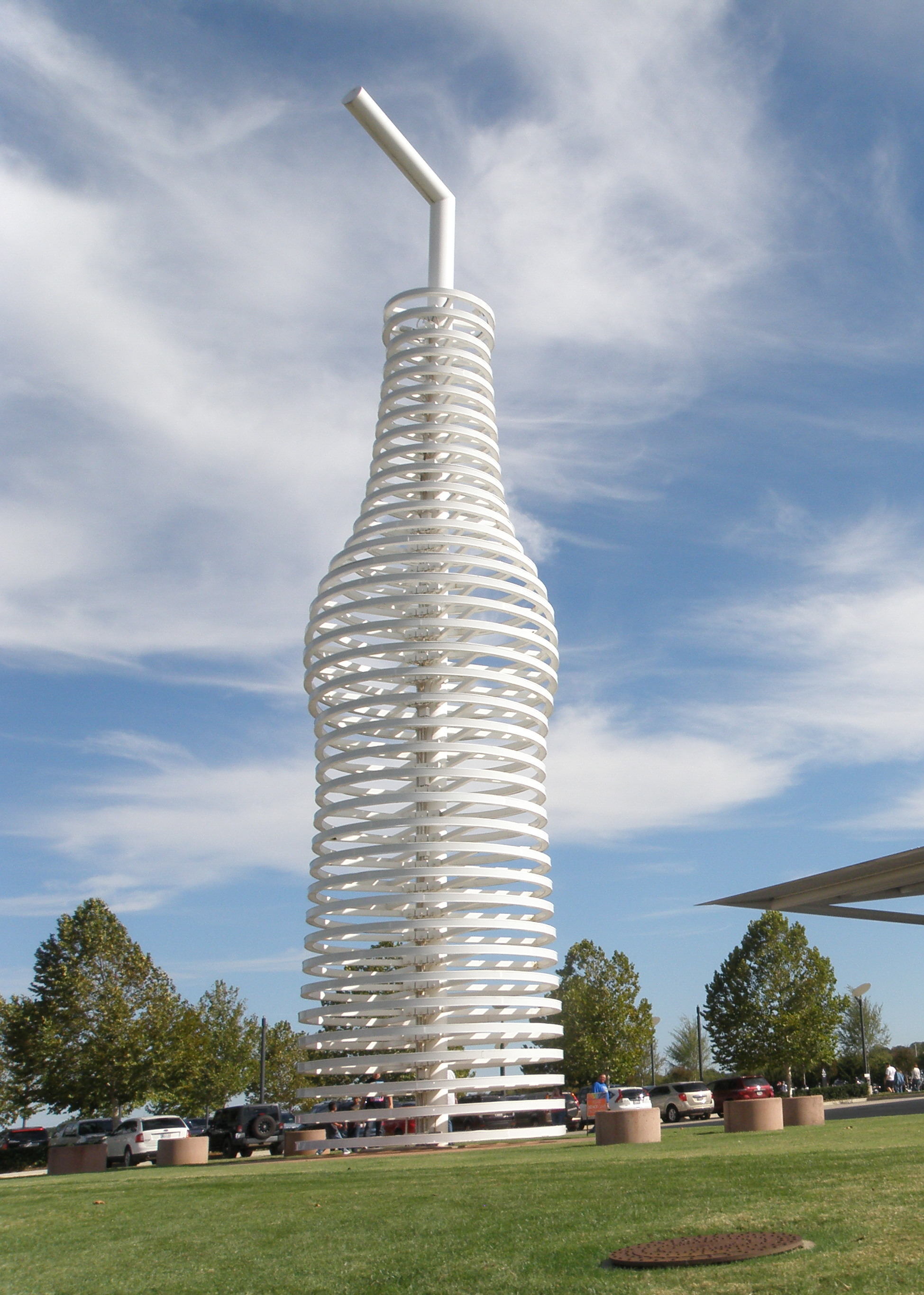
Bottle sculpture outside Pops

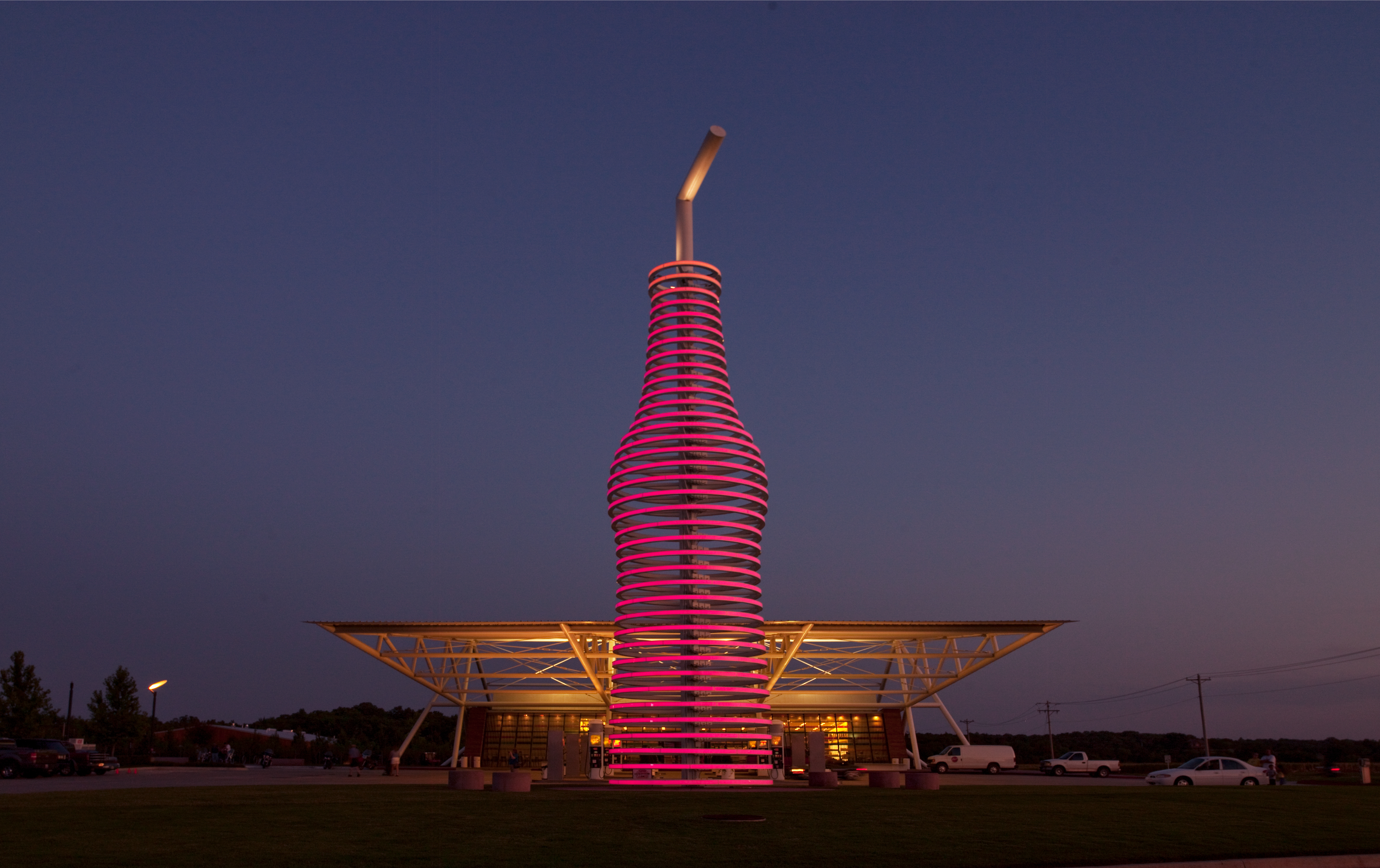
Bottle sculpture lit up at night

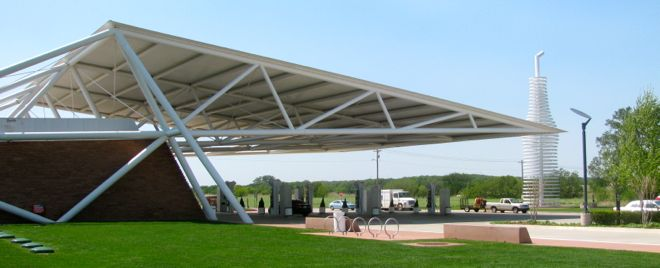
Pops cantilever in Arcadia
