= Arcadia, Oklahoma =

Town in Oklahoma County, Oklahoma

- Town
- Town of Arcadia
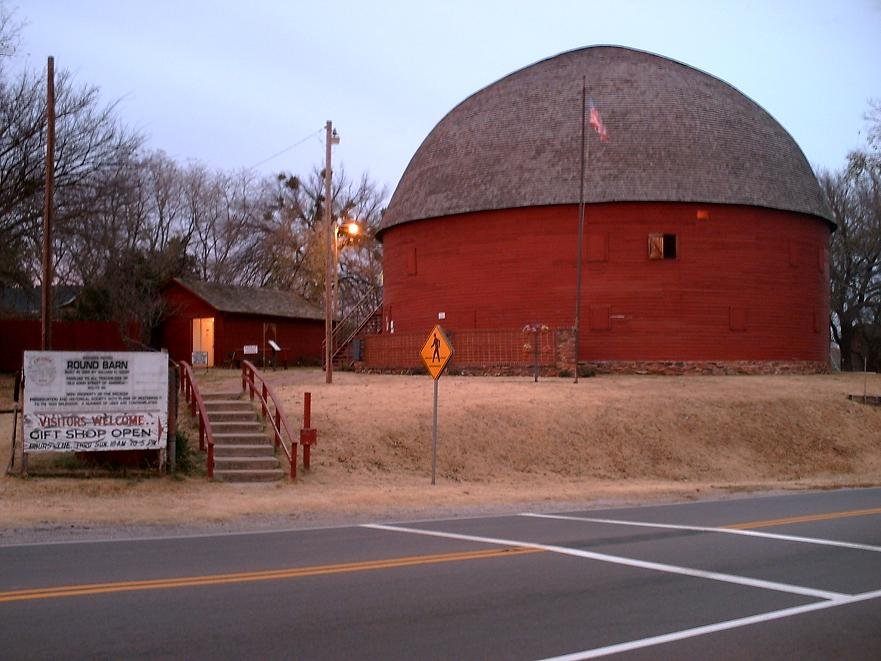
- Arcadia's Round Barn, a Route 66 icon

- Seal
- Motto: "Unity - Pride - Commitment"
- Location in Oklahoma County and the state of Oklahoma.
- Coordinates: 35°39′56″N 97°19′32″W
- Country: United States
- State: Oklahoma
- County: Oklahoma

Area
  - Total: 1.52 sq mi (3.93 km^{2})
  - Land: 1.52 sq mi (3.93 km^{2})
  - Water: 0 sq mi (0.00 km^{2})
- Elevation: 961 ft (293 m)

Population (2020)
  - Total: 169
  - Density: 111.3/sq mi (42.99/km^{2})
- Time zone: UTC-6 (Central (CST))
  - Summer (DST): UTC-5 (CDT)
- ZIP code: 73007
- Area code: 405
- FIPS code: 40-02550
- GNIS feature ID: 2412375
- Website: townofarcadiaok.gov

Arcadia is a town in Oklahoma County, Oklahoma, United States, and a part of the Oklahoma City metropolitan area. The population was 169 at the 2020 United States census, a 31% decrease from the 247 recorded in the 2010 census.

== History ==
Arcadia was established soon after the Land Rush of 1889 and drew both white and African American cotton farmers, who named the land after the Greek town of Arcadia. A post office was established in 1890. The Missouri, Kansas and Texas Railroad constructed a line in 1902-3 from Bartlesville to Oklahoma City, passing immediately south of Arcadia.

The town thrived as an agricultural community in the early 20th century. Located near the Deep Fork River, the soil was well suited to producing cotton. The local newspaper, the Arcadia Star, claimed Arcadia had a population of 800 in 1904. However, the U.S. census of 1900 counted only 706 in Deep Fork Township, which included Arcadia. The census at statehood in 1907 registered 994 persons in Arcadia.

In June 1924, fire destroyed most of the business district. One building, Tulon's Drugstore, survived and is now listed in the National Register of Historic Places.

Voters resisted incorporation attempts in the 1930s and again in 1980. Sentiment changed after Edmond, Oklahoma attempted to annex the community in 1984-85, and Arcadia finally incorporated in 1987.

== Geography ==
Arcadia is located approximately 17 miles (27 km) northeast of Oklahoma City.

According to the United States Census Bureau, the town has a total area of 1.5 square miles (3.9 km^{2}), all land.

== Demographics ==
Historical population
Census	Pop.	Note	%±
1990	320		—
2000	279		−12.8%
2010	247		−11.5%
2020	169		−31.6%
U.S. Decennial Census

=== Racial and ethnic composition ===
Arcadia town, Oklahoma – Racial and ethnic composition Note: the US Census treats Hispanic/Latino as an ethnic category. This table excludes Latinos from the racial categories and assigns them to a separate category. Hispanics/Latinos may be of any race.
Race / Ethnicity (NH = Non-Hispanic)	Pop 2000	Pop 2010	Pop 2020	% 2000	% 2010	% 2020
White alone (NH)	91	59	55	32.62%	23.89%	32.54%
Black or African American alone (NH)	155	140	77	55.56%	56.68%	45.56%
Native American or Alaska Native alone (NH)	20	18	12	7.17%	7.29%	7.10%
Asian alone (NH)	0	0	0	0.00%	0.00%	0.00%
Pacific Islander alone (NH)	0	0	0	0.00%	0.00%	0.00%
Other race alone (NH)	0	0	0	0.00%	0.00%	0.00%
Mixed race or Multiracial (NH)	12	24	17	4.30%	9.72%	10.06%
Hispanic or Latino (any race)	1	6	8	0.36%	2.43%	4.73%
Total	279	247	169	100.00%	100.00%	100.00%

=== 2020 census ===
As of the 2020 census, Arcadia had a population of 169. The median age was 42.8 years. 20.7% of residents were under the age of 18 and 20.7% of residents were 65 years of age or older. For every 100 females there were 125.3 males, and for every 100 females age 18 and over there were 119.7 males age 18 and over.

0.0% of residents lived in urban areas, while 100.0% lived in rural areas.

There were 77 households in Arcadia, of which 33.8% had children under the age of 18 living in them. Of all households, 33.8% were married-couple households, 29.9% were households with a male householder and no spouse or partner present, and 27.3% were households with a female householder and no spouse or partner present. About 31.2% of all households were made up of individuals and 9.1% had someone living alone who was 65 years of age or older.

There were 105 housing units, of which 26.7% were vacant. The homeowner vacancy rate was 3.3% and the rental vacancy rate was 26.7%.

=== 2010 census ===
As of the 2010 census, there were 247 people living in the town. The population density was 185 inhabitants per square mile (71/km^{2}). There were 113 housing units at an average density of 81.9 per square mile (31.6/km^{2}). The racial makeup of the town was 57.89% African American, 23.89% White, 7.29% Native American, 0.81% from other races, and 10.12% from two or more races. Hispanic or Latino of any race were 2.43% of the population.

There were 108 households, out of which 23.1% had children under the age of 18 living with them, 51.7% were married couples living together, 18.5% had a female householder with no husband present, and 35.2% were non-families. 30.6% of all households were made up of individuals, and 13.0% had someone living alone who was 65 years of age or older. The average household size was 2.31 and the average family size was 2.90.

In the town, the population was spread out, with 28.3% under the age of 18, 6.5% from 18 to 24, 20.4% from 25 to 44, 28.3% from 45 to 64, and 16.5% who were 65 years of age or older. The median age was 42 years. For every 100 females, there were 111.4 males. For every 100 females age 18 and over, there were 98.0 males.

The median income for a household in the town was $24,359, and the median income for a family was $27,083. Males had a median income of $22,500 versus $25,625 for females. The per capita income for the town was $15,722. About 10.9% of families and 29.8% of the population were below the poverty line, including 26.8% of those under the age of eighteen and 20.5% of those 65 or over.

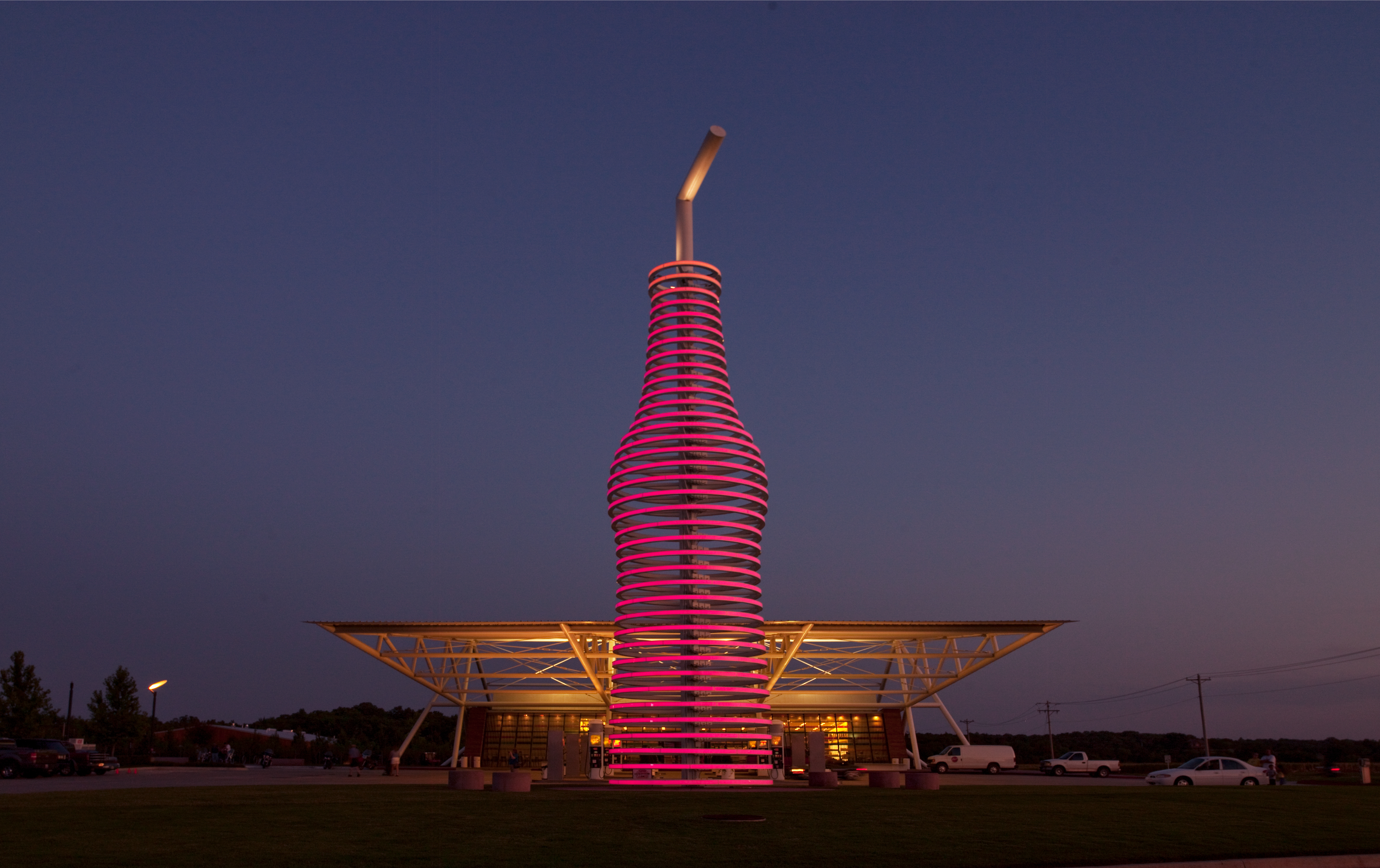
Pops Restaurant, Route 66, Arcadia

== Economy ==
Residents who are still employed generally commute to other communities for work, primarily in Oklahoma City.

== Education ==
Most of Arcadia is in Edmond Public Schools, while a portion is in Luther Public Schools.
