= Rock Café =

Historic restaurant in Stroud, Oklahoma, US

- U.S. National Register of Historic Places
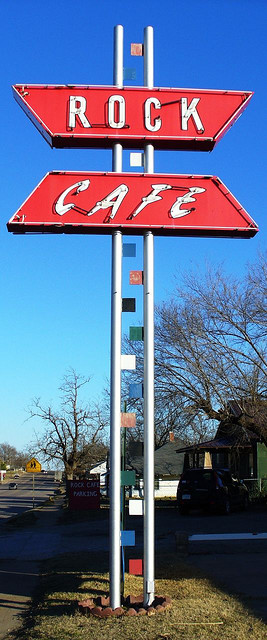

- Location within Oklahoma Location within the United States
- Location: 114 W. Main Street; Stroud, Oklahoma
- Coordinates: 35.749°N 96.6544°W
- Built: 1938
- Built by: Roy Rieves
- Architectural style: Bungalow/Craftsman
- MPS: Route 66 in Oklahoma MPS
- NRHP reference No.: 01000661
- Added to NRHP: June 14, 2001

The Rock Café in Stroud, Oklahoma, a historic restaurant on U.S. Route 66, takes its name from the local sandstone used in its construction.

Originally built in 1936 and opened in 1939, the Rock Café reopened on May 29, 2009 after extensive repairs by historic preservationist David Burke due to damage from a 2008 fire. The restaurant's cookbook, written during the rebuilding effort, was published in November 2009.

Rock Café proprietor Dawn Welch, a long-time promoter of U.S. Route 66 in Oklahoma selected by The Oklahoman as Oklahoma's 2009 Woman of the Year, is the basis for animated character Sally Carrera in the Pixar film Cars.

== History ==
Roy Rieves started building the Rock Café in 1936 during the Dust Bowl era of the Great Depression and relied on local materials to build the café's distinctive stone exterior, doing much of the construction work himself or hiring students. The original costs included $100 for the land and $5 for local Kellyville sandstone left over from construction on the U.S. Route 66 roadway which had come to Stroud, Oklahoma in 1926.

The café opened in August 1939, initially operating under manager Miss Thelma Holloway, and was a busy local Greyhound bus stop during World War II. Its neon signage was installed in the late 1940s. Mamie Mayfield operated the Rock Café twenty-four hours a day in 1959 and retired at age 70 on July 14, 1983.

Business from cross-country truckers declined with the construction of Interstate 44 in Oklahoma, a toll road, although Highway 66 remains as a free alternative to the Turner Turnpike. After U.S. Route 66 was decommissioned in 1985, highway 66 became Oklahoma State Highway 66. Dawn Welch, the current proprietor, acquired the café from Ed Smalley in 1993.

Mamie J. Mayfield's (December 22, 1912 - September 25, 1994) name was kept alive in the form of a souvenir shop, Mamie's General Store.

In 1999, an F3 tornado heavily damaged Stroud, destroying the town's 53-store Tanger Outlet mall and wiping out a handful of key local employers including a Sygma food service distribution facility. The Rock Café survived, though its neon sign was damaged, but business was down by half due to the state of the fragile local economy. In 2001, the Rock Café was listed on the National Register of Historic Places, qualifying it for matching grants and loans to finance its historic restoration.

Stroud's famous Rock Cafe in November of 2026

When the first Pixar crews researching Route 66 stopped at the Rock Café in 2001, restoration and repair of the 1999 tornado damage was not yet complete; the neon flickered briefly but failed to come to life. With a federal grant and a loan of $30,000 in matching funds, the Rock Café was restored with new heating and air conditioning systems, replacement of the original wiring, restoration of neon signage and a return of the building to its original layout.

In 2007, travelling artist Bob Waldmire depicted the café in one of his works; Food Network's Diners, Drive-Ins and Dives also devoted part of an episode to the Rock. On January 21, 2010, Dawn Welch appeared on NBC-TV´s Today show, cooking and promoting her book. The January 2010 edition of "Oklahoma Living" magazine named the Rock Café "Best Oklahoma Diner", featuring its proprietor in a cover photo.

Stroud, Oklahoma also slowly began to recover economically through increased activity in the oil and gas sectors and in tourism. While the destroyed outlet shopping mall was not rebuilt, the community successfully marketed its industrial park, and is now a leading small city in oilfield manufacturing and transportation, particularly in the rail and pipeline sectors.
