= Confederation of Labour of Kazakhstan =

Trade union center in Kazakhstan

CKL
- Confederation of Labour of Kazakhstan
- Founded: March 2, 2004
- Headquarters: Nur-Sultan, Kazakhstan
- Location: Kazakhstan
- Key people: Serik Abdrakhmanov, president Murat Mashkenov, secretary general

The Confederation of Labour of Kazakhstan (CLK) is a trade union center in Kazakhstan. It was founded March 2, 2004.
