= McLain Rogers Park =

- U.S. National Register of Historic Places
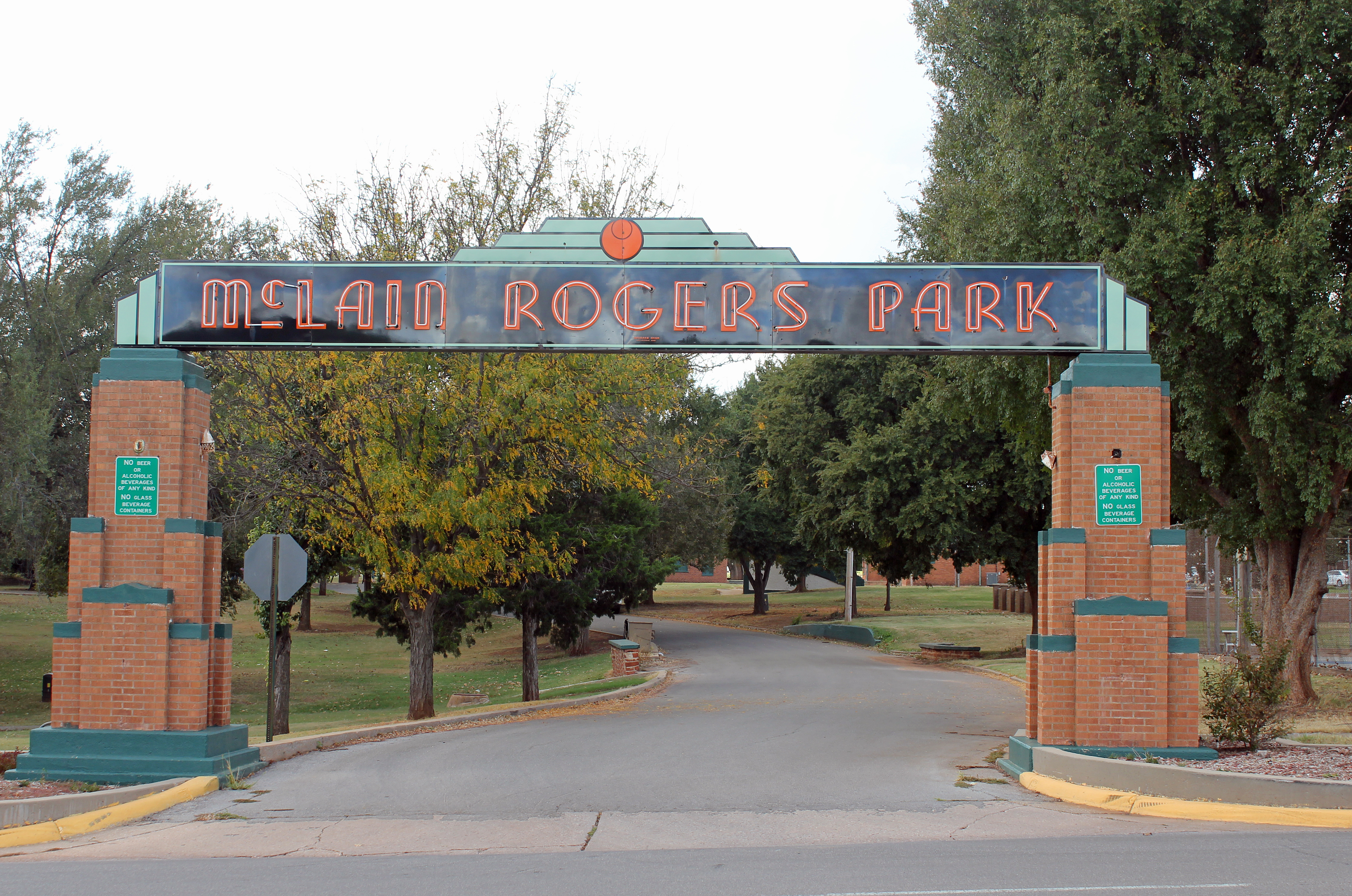
- East Gate

- Location within Oklahoma
- Location: Junction of Tenth and Bess Rogers Dr., Clinton, Oklahoma
- Coordinates: 35°30′20″N 98°58′25″W
- Area: 12 acres (4.9 ha)
- Built: 1934
- Built by: Rich, E.M.; FERA, et al.
- Architectural style: Art Deco
- NRHP reference No.: 04000944
- Added to NRHP: September 3, 2004

The McLain Rogers Park, in Clinton, Oklahoma, was built in 1934 and following years. It includes Art Deco architecture. It has also been known as Clinton City Park. It was listed on the National Register of Historic Places in 2004. The listing included four contributing buildings, nine contributing structures, and a contributing object.

It has a striking entranceway, its East Gate, fronting onto Route 66.

It was developed in multiple projects funded by New Deal programs: the Federal Emergency Relief Administration, the Civil Works Administration, and the Works Progress Administration.
