= Clinton Regional Airport =

Airport near Clinton, Ohio, U.S.

- IATA: CLK; ICAO: KCLK; FAA LID: CLK

Summary
- Airport type: Public
- Owner: City of Clinton
- Serves: Clinton, Oklahoma
- Elevation AMSL: 1,616 ft (493 m)
- Coordinates: 35°32′17.78″N 098°55′58″W
- Interactive map of Clinton Regional Airport

Runways
Direction	Length		Surface
Direction	ft	m	Surface
17/35	4,305	1,312	Asphalt
13/31	1,348	411	Turf

Statistics (2017)
- Aircraft operations: 3,600
- Based aircraft: 17
- Source: Federal Aviation Administration

Clinton Regional Airport (IATA: CLK, ICAO: KCLK, FAA LID: CLK) is a city-owned public-use airport located three miles northeast of the central business district of Clinton, a city in Custer County and Washita County, Oklahoma, United States.

== Facilities and aircraft ==
Clinton Regional Airport covers an area of 480 acres (190 ha) at an elevation of 1,616 feet (492.6 m) above mean sea level. It has two runways: 17/35 is 4,305 by 75 feet (1,312 x 23 m) with an asphalt surface and 13/31 is 1,348 by 212 feet (411 x 75 m) with a turf surface.

For the 12-month period ending June 21, 2017, the airport had 3,600 aircraft operations, an average of 69 per week: 100% general aviation. At that time there were 17 aircraft based at this airport: 17 single-engine.

== See also ==
- List of airports in Oklahoma
