= Arcadia Round Barn =

- U.S. National Register of Historic Places
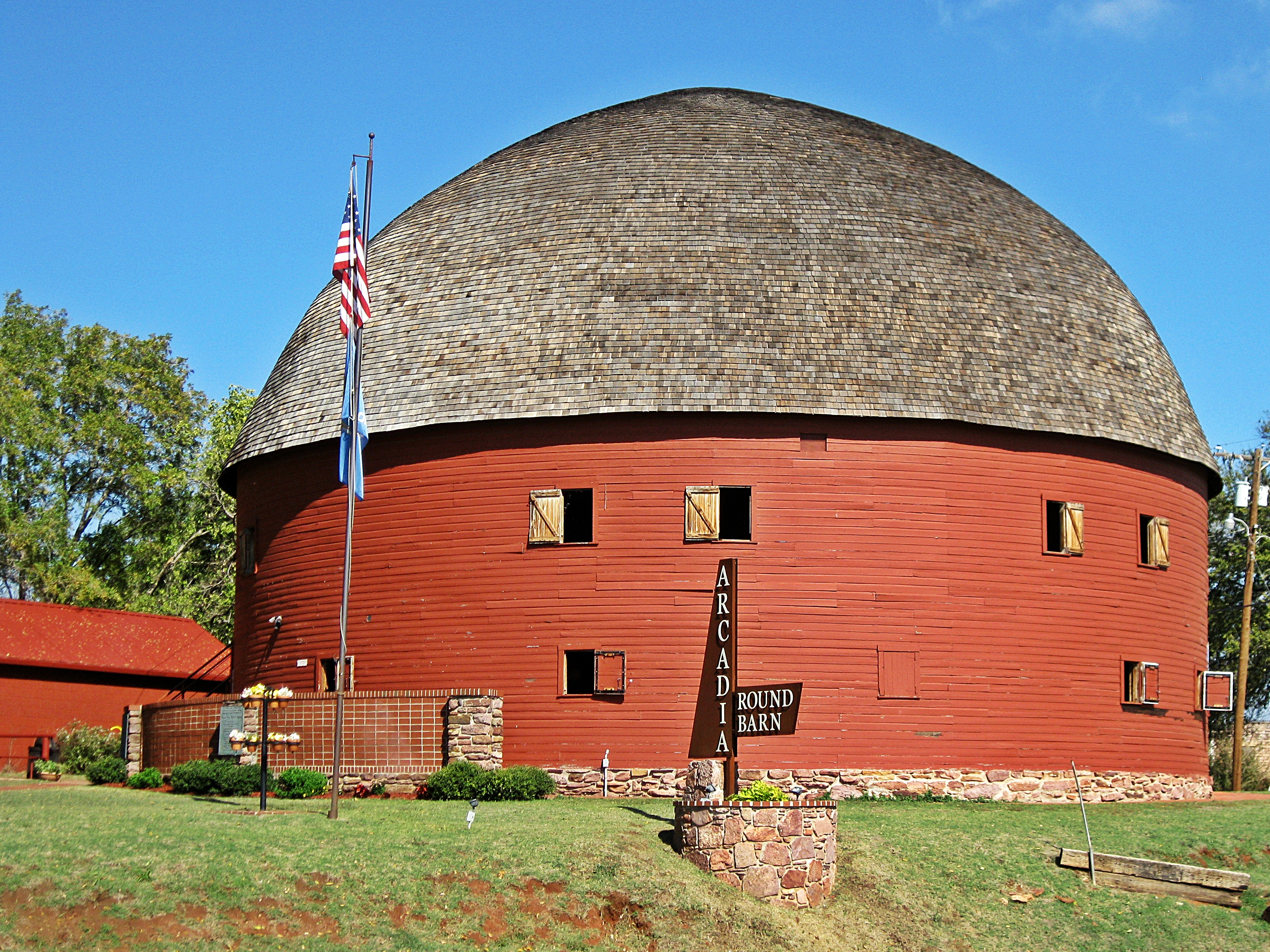

- Location within Oklahoma Location within the United States
- Location: 107 Highway 66; Arcadia, Oklahoma
- Coordinates: 35°39′44″N 97°19′33″W
- Built: 1898
- Built by: William H. Odor
- MPS: Route 66 in Oklahoma MPS
- NRHP reference No.: 77001094
- Added to NRHP: 1977

The Arcadia Round Barn is a landmark and tourist attraction on historic U.S. Route 66 in Arcadia, Oklahoma, United States. It was built by local farmer William Harrison Odor in 1898 using native bur oak boards soaked while green and forced into the curves needed for the walls and roof rafters. A second level was incorporated for use as a community gathering place. The town of Arcadia developed and prospered with the arrival of the railroad and in the 1920s the newly commissioned Route 66 was aligned through the town, passing next to the Round Barn.

With the reduction of traffic along Route 66 following the arrival of the Interstate, Arcadia and the barn likewise declined. In 1988 the 60 foot diameter roof collapsed. A team of volunteers led by Luther Robison worked to rebuild the structure, and restoration work was completed in 1992. Today the old barn is a tourist attraction and visitors admire the architectural and engineering details of America's only truly round (as opposed to hexagonal or octagonal) barn.

== See also ==
- List of round barns
- Ryan Round Barn, located in Johnson Sauk State Park, Illinois, completed in 1910.
