= Clinton F. Irwin =

American lawyer (1854–1923)

- Born: January 1, 1854; Franklin Grove, Lee County, Illinois
- Died: November 4, 1923 (aged 69); Elgin, Illinois
- Occupations: Teacher, attorney, judge, politician
- Years active: 1872-1923
- Known for: Justice of the Oklahoma Territory Supreme Court from 1899 to 1907.

Clinton F. Irwin (January 1, 1854 – November 4, 1923), an Illinois lawyer of Irish descent, was a justice of the Oklahoma Territory Supreme Court from 1899 to 1907.

== Early life ==
Clinton F. Irwin was born in Franklin Grove, Lee County, Illinois to Henry Irwin Jr. and his wife, Ann Elizabeth McNeal, on January 1, 1854. Henry Irwin Jr. was a native of County Antrim, Ireland who had immigrated first to Canada, as a small child with his parents then came to Franklin Grove in 1836, when he was 12 years old, and where he married Ann Elizabeth. Clinton Irwin's paternal grandfather, Henry Irwin Sr., a farmer, had settled in Franklin Grove, where he died in 1853. In 1859, the Irwin family moved to Maple Park in Kane County, Illinois. There, Henry got into the hotel business and also ran a meat market. Henry and Ann had three sons and six daughters. Henry Jr. died in 1880. Ann died in February, 1894.

Ann Elizabeth's father, Thomas McNeal, was born in Bedford County, Pennsylvania of Scots-Irish descent. He also moved to Kane County, Illinois at an early age, where he was a farmer. He settled near Dixon, Illinois remained there until he died. He and his wife had three sons and one daughter. One son was killed at the Battle of Perryville, Ohio in the Civil War.

== Education ==
Clinton Irwin attended public schools in Maple Park, where he completed what his biography calls a "common school education." He followed this by attending Wheaton College and finally the Northern Indiana Normal School and Business Institute in Valparaiso, Indiana. (Note: The school was originally named the Valparaiso Male and Female College and was financially supported by the Methodist Church. However, the church withdrew its support in 1871, because of financial difficulties, and the school closed for two years. Henry Baker Brown reopened it in 1873 and renamed it the Northern Indiana Normal School and Business Institute then Valparaiso College in 1900 and finally Valpariso University in 1906.) By the time he was 18, Irwin had become a public school teacher, which he continued to do until he was 25. While still teaching, he began reading law at the office of W. H. H. Kennedy, but continued to do so alone for the last three years. He passed the bar exam and was admitted to the bar in 1879. He opened a law office in Maple Park, Illinois, where he practiced until 1883. Then he moved to Elgin, Illinois and formed a partnership with Robert S. Egan.

Clinton married Julia Helen Egan on November 3, 1880. She was the daughter of William Egan and his wife, the former Bridget Sanders. The marriage produced four children, one of which died as a young child. He was a lifelong Republican party stalwart, who began holding political offices when he was a supervisor of Virgil, Illinois in 1881–2. Next, he was assistant supervisor in Elgin in 1885. he served as corporation counsel for Elgin from May, 1895, until May, 1897.

== Oklahoma Territorial Supreme Court ==
President William McKinley appointed Clinton F. Irwin to become an associate justice of the Oklahoma (Territorial) Supreme Court on February 21, 1889, replacing Justice John C. Tarsney.

When the Territory was divided into seven Judicial Districts on June 4, 1902, Judge Irwin was assigned responsibility for District 2. This district included the counties of: Canadian, Kingfisher, Cleveland, Washita and Custer. Irwin's position was automatically terminated when the Territory became the state of Oklahoma on March 16, 1907.

== Post-judgeship ==
In 1908, Irwin returned to living in Elgin, Illinois. There he engaged in the private practice until he was elected as a circuit judge in 1913. He remained in that position until his death from pneumonia on November 4, 1923.
