= Quentin Skinner (American football) =

American football player (born 2001)

No. 84 – Philadelphia Eagles
- Position: Wide receiver
- Roster status: Practice squad

Personal information
- Born: December 24, 2001 (age 24); Claremore, Oklahoma, U.S.
- Listed height: 6 ft 5 in (1.96 m)
- Listed weight: 195 lb (88 kg)

Career information
- High school: Claremore (Claremore, Oklahoma)
- College: Kansas (2020–2024)
- NFL draft: 2025: undrafted

Career history
- New York Jets (2025); Buffalo Bills (2026)*; Philadelphia Eagles (2026–present)*
- * Offseason or practice squad member only

Career NFL statistics as of 2025
- Receptions: 1
- Receiving yards: 10
- Stats at Pro Football Reference

Quentin Skinner (born December 24, 2001) is an American professional football wide receiver for the Philadelphia Eagles of the National Football League (NFL). He played college football for the Kansas Jayhawks.

== Early life ==
Skinner is from Claremore, Oklahoma. He attended Claremore High School where he competed in football, soccer and track and field. He placed fifth at the state high jump championships in 2019 and also had an offer to play for the national under-18 soccer team. In football, he played as a wide receiver and was a member of the varsity team for three years, totaling 59 receptions for 759 yards and nine touchdowns during that time. Skinner missed most of his senior year due to a torn ACL. Ranked a two-star recruit, he had only a few offers from NCAA Division II-level schools, which wanted to convert him to defensive back. He instead committed to play college football for the Kansas Jayhawks as a walk-on.

== College career ==
As a true freshman at Kansas in 2020, Skinner redshirted. He then was used on special teams in 2021. Skinner led the team in special teams snaps that year and was then placed on scholarship. He saw more action on offense in 2022 and recorded 26 catches for 440 yards and five touchdowns. Skinner then recorded 29 receptions for 587 yards and two touchdowns in 2023, leading the team with over 20 yards-per-reception while helping them record their first bowl win in over 10 years. Skinner caught 24 passes for 557 yards and three touchdowns in his last season, 2024. He concluded his collegiate career with 80 receptions for 1,584 yards and 11 touchdowns.

== Professional career ==
Pre-draft measurables
Height	Weight	Arm length	Hand span	Wingspan	40-yard dash	10-yard split	20-yard split	20-yard shuttle	Three-cone drill	Vertical jump	Broad jump
6 ft 3 7/8 in (1.93 m)	203 lb (92 kg)	32 1/2 in (0.83 m)	9 1/2 in (0.24 m)	6 ft 6 5/8 in (2.00 m)	4.51 s	1.64 s	2.64 s	4.34 s	6.94 s	33.0 in (0.84 m)	10 ft 2 in (3.10 m)
All values from Pro Day

=== New York Jets ===
After going unselected in the 2025 NFL draft, Skinner signed with the New York Jets as an undrafted free agent. He was waived on August 26 as part of final roster cuts and re-signed to the practice squad the next day. He was promoted to the active roster on December 27.

On June 8, 2026, Skinner was waived by the Jets with an injury designation.

=== Buffalo Bills ===
On July 14, 2026, Skinner was claimed off waivers by the Buffalo Bills. He was waived by the Bills on August 29.

=== Philadelphia Eagles ===
On October 28, 2026, Skinner signed with the Philadelphia Eagles practice squad. On November 3, he was released, but re-signed to the practice squad on November 18.
