= Supernaw =

Supernaw is a surname. Notable people with the surname include:

- Doug Supernaw (1960–2020), American country music singer-songwriter and musician
- Kywin Supernaw (born 1975), American football player
- Phillip Supernaw (born 1990), American football player
