= Matt Whatley (baseball) =

American baseball player (born 1996)

Free agent
- Catcher
- Born: January 7, 1996 (age 30); Claremore, Oklahoma, U.S.
- Bats: Right Throws: Right
- Stats at Baseball Reference

Matthew Whatley (born January 7, 1996) is an American professional baseball catcher who is a free agent.

== Amateur career ==
Whatley attended Claremore High School in Claremore, Oklahoma. He received one offer to play college baseball in NCAA Division I, from Oral Roberts University. He played for the Oral Roberts Golden Eagles. In 2016, he played collegiate summer baseball in the Cape Cod Baseball League for the Yarmouth-Dennis Red Sox. In 2017, he won the Johnny Bench Award.

== Professional career ==
=== Texas Rangers ===
The Texas Rangers drafted Whatley in the third round, with the 104th overall selection, of the 2017 Major League Baseball draft. He signed with the Rangers, receiving a $517,100 signing bonus.

Whatley spent 2017 with both the rookie-level Arizona League Rangers and Low-A Spokane Indians, posting a combined .295 batting average with six home runs and 28 RBI in 44 games between the two affiliates. Whatley began the 2018 season with the Down East Wood Ducks of the High-A Carolina League and was reassigned to the Hickory Crawdads of the Single-A South Atlantic League at the end of the season. In 52 games between both teams, Whatley hit .179 with three home runs and 14 RBI.

Whatley was assigned back to Hickory for the 2019 season, hitting .234/.349./321 with four home runs, 49 RBI, and 29 stolen bases. Whatley played in the Arizona Fall League for the Surprise Saguaros following the 2019 season. Whatley was named the Texas Rangers 2019 Minor League Defender of the Year. Whatley did not play in a game in 2020 due to the cancellation of the Minor League Baseball season because of the COVID-19 pandemic.

Whatley spent the 2021 season with the Frisco RoughRiders of the Double-A Central, hitting .203/.316/.282 with four home runs and 14 RBI. He split the 2022 season between Frisco and the Round Rock Express of the Triple-A Pacific Coast League, hitting a combined .228/.287/.328 with four home runs and 16 RBI. In 70 games for Round Rock in 2023, he batted .203/.290/.322 with six home runs, 25 RBI, and five stolen bases. Whatley elected free agency following the season on November 6, 2023.

On November 27, 2023, Whatley re-signed with the Rangers organization on a minor league contract. He spent 2024 with Triple-A Round Rock, he played in 50 games and hit .199/.295/.319 with five home runs, 15 RBI, and four stolen bases. Whatley elected free agency following the season on November 4, 2024.

=== Toronto Blue Jays ===
On February 5, 2025, Whatley signed a minor league contract with the Toronto Blue Jays that included an invitation to spring training. He did not make an appearance for the organization before being released by Toronto on May 2.
