= Claremore Mound =

Mound in Rogers County, Oklahoma, US

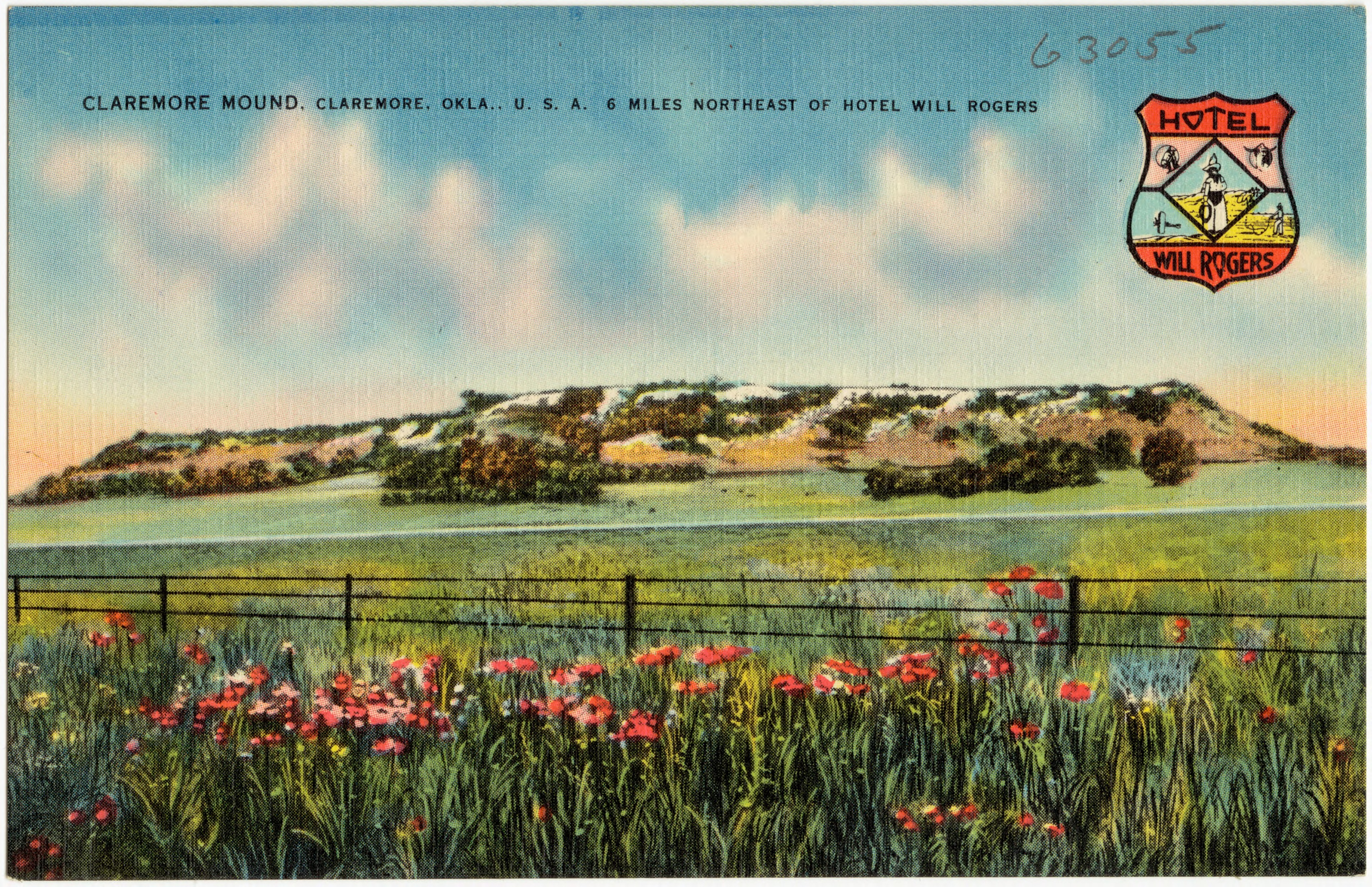

Highest point
- Elevation: 784 ft (239 m)
- Coordinates: 36.385°N 95.660°W

Naming
- Native name: Clermont (French)

Geography

Claremore Mound is a natural feature in present-day Rogers County, Oklahoma. The mound is located north of Sageeyah near the south bank of the Verdigris River.

The rocky mound has an elevation of 784 feet (239 m) above sea level. The area on top of the mound, where the Osage built a village called Pasona about 1802, is about 25 acres (100,000 m^{2}).

Claremore Mound was the site of the Battle of Strawberry Moon (a.k.a. Battle of Claremore Mound). In June 1817, a band of Cherokee Indians and their allies, under Chief Spring Frog (Too-an-tuh), attacked Pasuga, an Osage Indian village at the foot of Claremore Mound, killing thirty-eight Osage, including their Chief Glahmo, and taking one hundred and four captives. In revenge, the Osage attacked the Cherokee for the next twenty years, led by Wah-tianka, Glahmo's son.

European-American settlers designated both the mound and the nearby town as Clermont ("clear mountain" in English) in honor of Chief Glahmo, who French traders had nicknamed Chief Clermont. When the town petitioned for a post office in 1874, a clerical error listed Clermont as Claremore; the error was never rectified and today both the mound and the town are named Claremore.

Parts of the Cherokee reservation, established in the late 1830s in Indian Territory, lay about 2 miles (3.2 km) to the west. The modern city of Claremore, developed by European Americans, is about 7 miles (11 km) away.

== See also ==
- Battle of Claremore Mound
