= Fawn Douglas =

Native American artist and educator from Nevada, U.S.

- Born: 1978 (age 47–48); Claremore, Oklahoma
- Citizenship: Las Vegas Paiute Tribe and U.S.
- Education: MFA: University of Nevada, Las Vegas
- Known for: co-founding Nuwu Art
- Partner: A. B. Wilkinson
- Website: nuwuart.com

Fawn Douglas is a Southern Paiute activist, artist, and educator in Las Vegas, Nevada. She has dedicated her work to revive and educate others about Native American cultures. Fawn Douglas educates through her artistic talents, such as painting, weaving, and performances, to share Indigenous stories.

Douglas is a co-founder of Nuwu Art and Activism studios; and she directs the Nuwu Art Gallery and Community Center. Her studio is in Historic Huntridge Neighborhood which is very central and accessible to people who want to be evolved in Las Vegas.

== Background ==
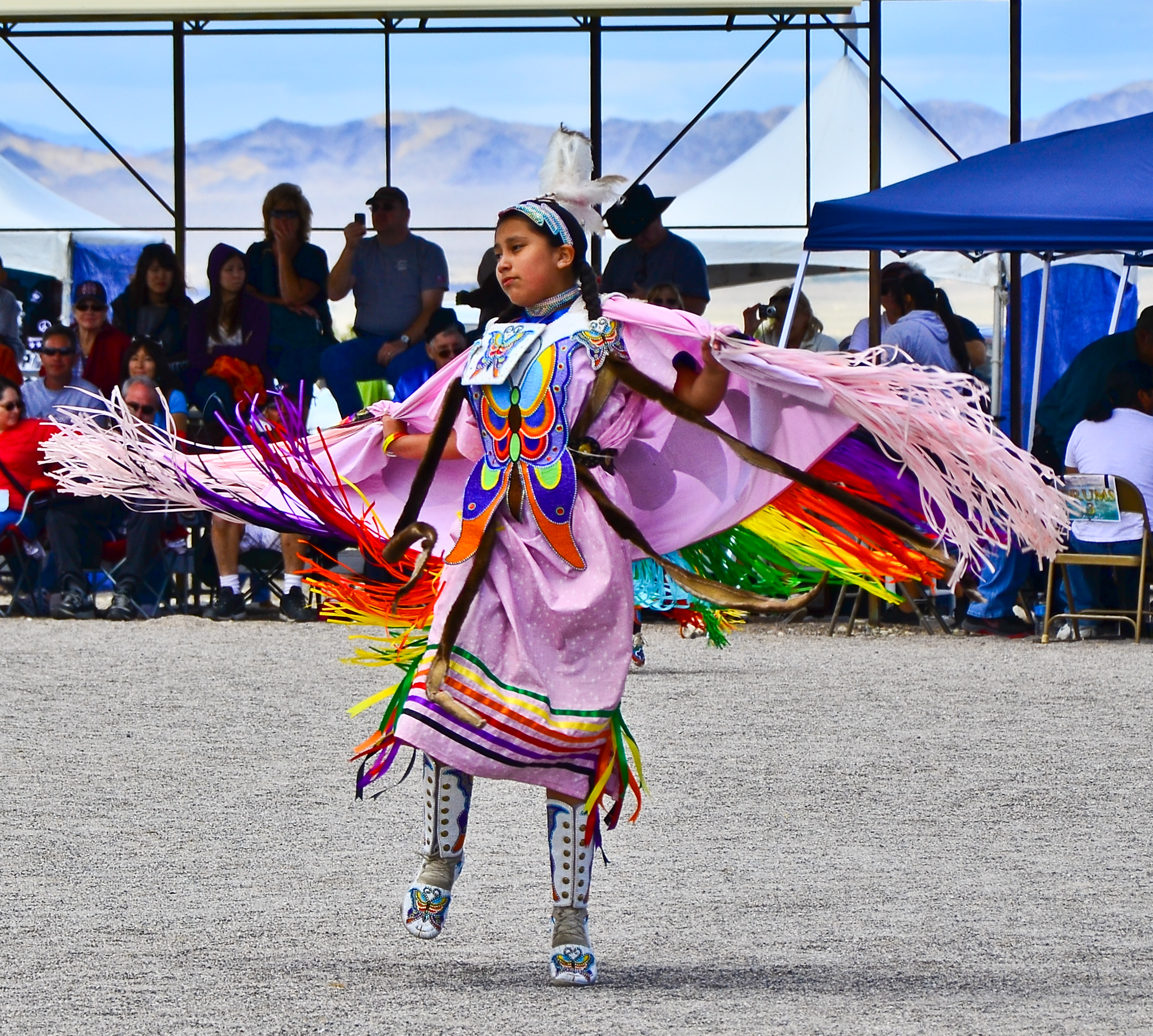
Las Vegas Paiute Tribe's powwow

Born in Claremore, Oklahoma, Fawn Douglas, an Indigenous activist and citizen of the Las Vegas Paiute Tribe She also has Moapa Paiute, Southern Cheyenne, Muscogee, Pawnee, and Scottish-American ancestry.

== Education ==
Douglas earned her Master of Fine Arts at the University of Nevada, Las Vegas, graduating in 2015. She has taught art courses, and Indigenous studies classes and was active in student organizations such as Native American Student Association, American Indian Alliance, and the Native American Alumni Club. Moreover, her work is in preserving the natural land and water in Las Vegas and an activist of women’s rights. She does this through her art, which helps with her Indigenous work and women’s rights work.

== Professional exhibitions ==
Douglas is the founder and director of Nuwu Art + Activism Studios. At these studios, Douglas and her members share engagement in art practices, educational events, cultural consulting, and many other activities that support the continuation of knowledge about cultural traditions including, but not limited to Native American traditions, African American, LatinX and Indigenous. Nuwu Art also organizes exhibitions by many other artists.

Douglas has contributed to Meow Wolf, and has many other exhibitions throughout Vegas such as “Ah’-Wah-Nee,” Reservation for Irony: Native Wit and Contemporary Realities, and Nevada Humanities.

== Community ==
Douglas is a part of the IndigenousAF, which is a non-profit organization in Southern Nevada to further expand the knowledge of Indigenous people. This organization focuses on preserving Native Indigenous culture, community events to educate and engage Natives.

Through her tribe, she organizes protests and works with her fellow tribal citizens and local communities to educate and encourage others to be active in regard to political and cultural issues affecting natives.
