= J. M. Davis Arms and Historical Museum =

Museum in Oklahoma, United States

Coordinates: 36°18′55″N 95°36′54″W

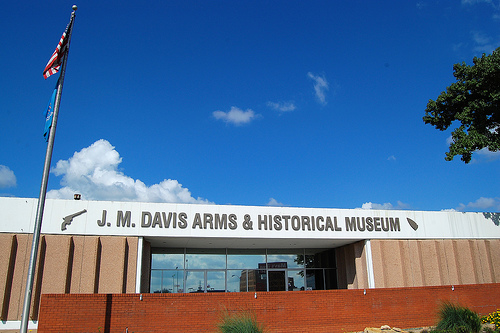
View of J.M. Davis Arms & Historical Museum

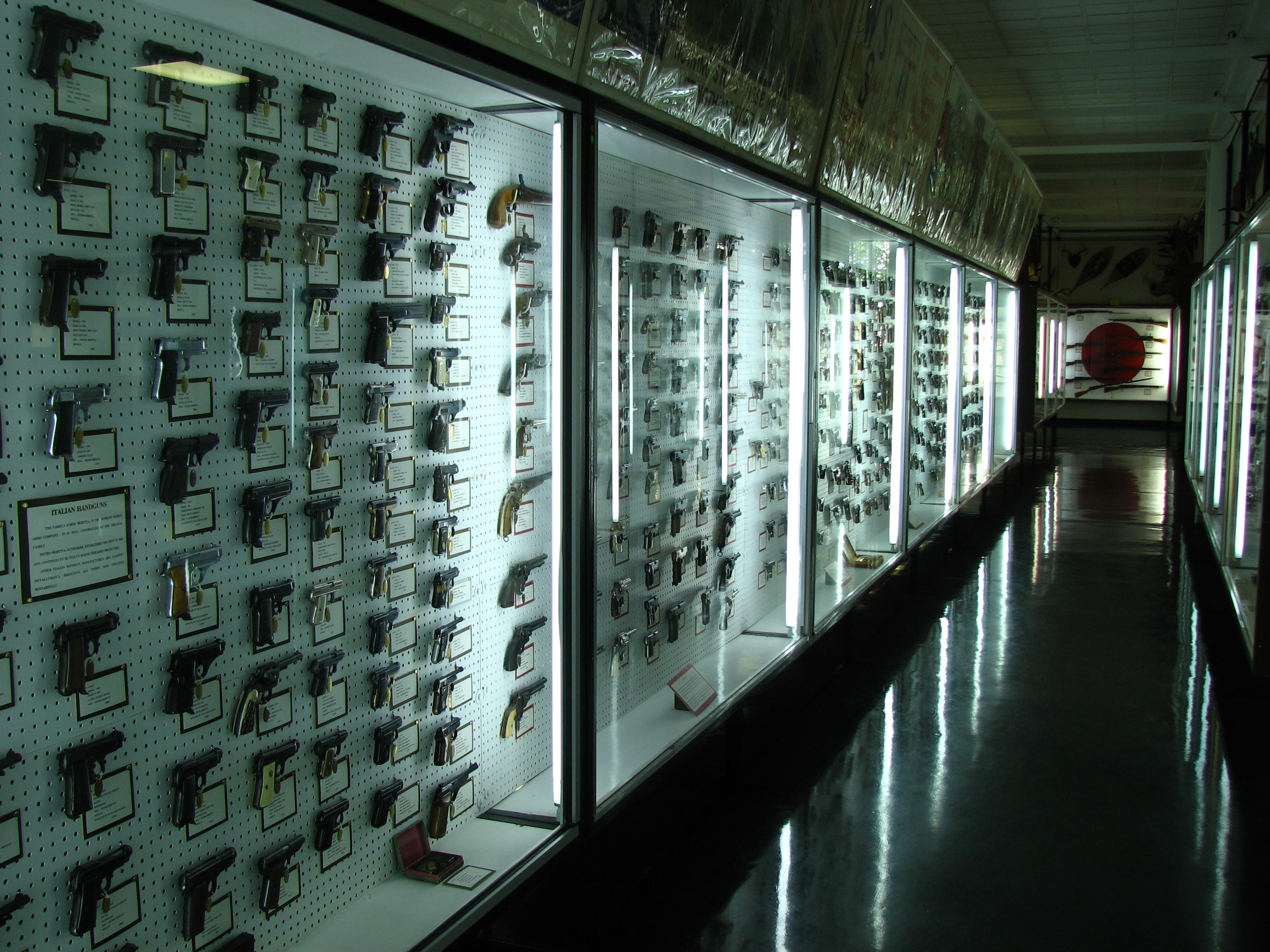
Part of the museum's gun collection

The J.M. Davis Arms and Historical Museum is located in Claremore, Oklahoma. The Museum houses over 20,000 firearms and firearm related items. The Davis Museum contains guns from all around the world including Kentucky rifles, a Gatling gun, black-powder guns of all types, cannons, rare Colts, Winchesters, elephant, whaling, and outlaw guns.

Besides firearms, the collection contains 1,200 German beer steins, statues by John Rogers, music boxes of the late 19th century, swords, knives, Native American artifacts, household antiques, a large boot jack collection, local cattle brands, hundreds of animal horns and trophy heads, and World War I posters. In October 2026, the museum unveiled the Big Red Gun, a 20-foot-long neon rendering of a Colt pistol, intended to offer a photo opportunity to passing tourists including those traveling Route 66.

== History ==
The museum represents the story of J.M. Davis and his efforts to preserve a piece of history so that others might enjoy this "World's Largest Privately Owned Gun Collection" for generations to come. J.M Davis was given his first gun at age seven. This kindled his ambition to learn about all kinds of guns and that ambition continued 78 years until his death in 1973.

In 1917 Mr. Davis moved to Claremore, Oklahoma and purchased the Mason Hotel. By 1929, he had accumulated over 99 types of guns, and at that time he had begun to display his collection on the walls of the Mason Hotel. He collected items ranging from a 500-year-old Chinese hand cannon, to the world's smallest manufactured gun.

In 1965, J.M. Davis transferred ownership of his large gun collection to a trust, the J.M. Davis Foundation, Inc. The foundation then entered into an agreement with the state. In this agreement, the State was given the entire collection with the understanding that the State of Oklahoma would house, preserve and display the collection for the general public with no admission charge. Within four years, the museum opened a modern 40,000 sq ft (3,700 m^{2}). facility to an enthusiastic public on Davis' 82nd birthday.
