= Will Rogers Memorial Library =

Historic library building/museum in Claremore, Oklahoma, United States

- U.S. National Register of Historic Places
- The Library, now the Claremore Museum of History, in October 2026
- Location: 121 North Weenonah Ave., Claremore, Oklahoma
- Area: 3,000 square foot
- Built: 1936
- Built by: Works Progress Administration
- NRHP reference No.: 100009400
- Added to NRHP: November 3, 2023

Will Rogers Memorial Library, also known simply as the Will Rogers Library, is located in the city of Claremore within Rogers County, State of Oklahoma. It was named after cowboy humorist Will Rogers. The library was constructed in 1936 during the Great Depression. The building has subsequently become the Claremore Museum of History. On November 3, 2023, it was put on the National Register of Historic Places listings in Creek County, Oklahoma with number 100009400.

== Early history ==
Work on the building started on February 10, 1936, with the $20,000 cost being covered by multiple sources including local citizens, the Federal government, and even Will Rogers himself. Construction was a Works Progress Administration project utilizing 80 unskilled laborers from the relief rolls instead of construction professionals like skilled stonemasons. Upon completion of the 3,000-square foot, largely sandstone building, the space was filled with 3,400 volumes from the town’s old library, a collection which had been started in the early 1900s and had been occupying two rooms in City Hall from 1925 on. Rogers had previously indicated a preference for naming the building the Sequoyah Memorial Library to honor the Cherokee innovator Sequoyah; but, as Rogers had tragically died exactly one year prior to the library’s August 15, 1936 dedication, the “Will Rogers” name was used instead.

The building was modified starting in December 1965 with a 25’ by 25’ brick addition to house the Lynn Riggs Memorial. When the Lynn Riggs Memorial was moved elsewhere in 1975, that space was turned over to the library.

The library’s book collection was moved in the summer of 1995 to a new building. The Lynn Riggs Memorial ended up back in its original 525-square-foot addition to the library building, with the remainder of the building’s space being remodeled and used by the City of Claremore as offices for its Fire Department.

== Claremore Museum of History ==
When local citizens in 2011 became interested in creating a museum to showcase Claremore history, the Will Rogers Memorial Library building was identified as a good location. A long-term lease agreement with the City of Claremore was signed in May of that year.

The museum largely highlights people and things from the Claremore area. People displays include the singer Patti Page and astronaut Stuart Roosa. The museum’s display on Lynn Riggs, the author whose play was adapted to become the musical Oklahoma!, won an Award of Excellence in 2023 from the American Association for State and Local History. But the not-so-famous have also been honored, as in 2021’s exhibit called Building Heritage, History, and Hope, regarding the contribution of black athletes, business owners, and others in the Claremore story.

Other types of displays include Route 66, as well as the town’s so-called “Radium Water” mineral-spa days (which water was mineral rich but did not actually contain any radium).

Besides long-term exhibits, the museum also participates in a rotating calendar of special events.

In 2025, the museum received funding for a Route 66-themed Legacy Garden containing life-sized statures of local icons. The Garden was unveiled in early 2026.
