= Black Dog (Osage chief) =

Native American Chief of the Osage Nation

Black Dog (Osage, Manka-Chonka, ca. 1780–1848) was a Native American Chief of the Hunkah band of the Osage Indians that lived in an area around present Baxter Springs, Kansas. In the fall of 1803, the band moved to the village of Pasuga (Big Cedar), present day Claremore, Oklahoma.

He took his band on hunts as far away as Santa Fe, then part of Mexico, possibly earning the designation Manka-Chonka in battles with the Comanche. He is credited with engineering a trail known as the Black Dog Trail east of present Baxter Springs, Kansas to the Great Salt Plains in present Alfalfa County, Oklahoma.

On a visit to Fort Gibson in 1834, George Catlin painted Black Dog's picture, giving his name as "Tchong-tas-sab-bee, Black Dog, Second Chief".

Black Dog is known to have had at least one son, also called Black Dog (1827–1910), who became an Osage chief in 1870.

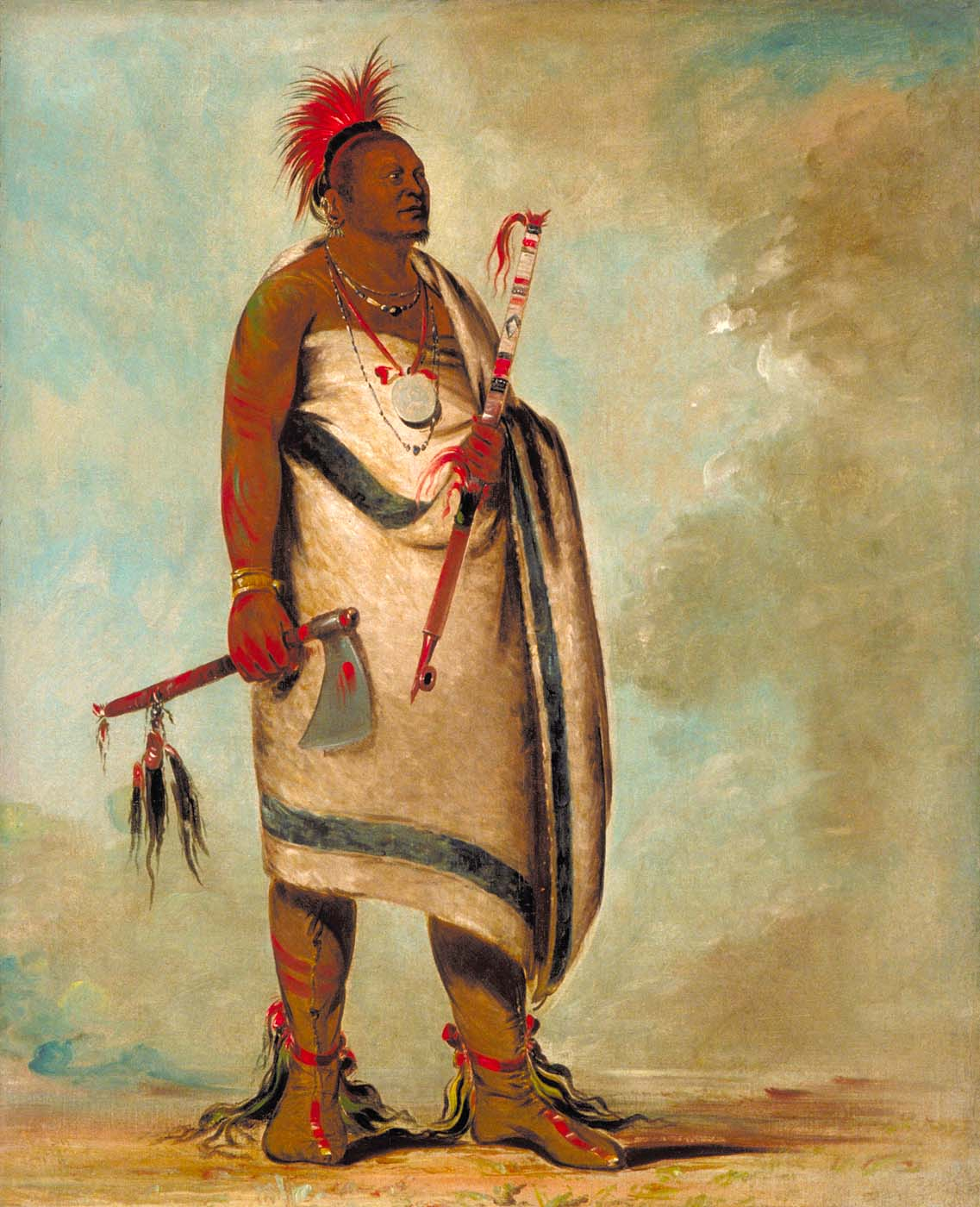
Tchong-tas-sab-bee, Chief Black Dog, artist George Catlin 1834.

== Early life ==
Black Dog was born around 1780 near the Mississippi River and the site of the present-day city of St. Louis, Missouri. His birth name was Zhin-gawa-ca (or Shinka-Wah-Sa), meant Dark Eagle or Sacred Little One. About 1802 his people migrated and settled in the northeastern part of the present state of Oklahoma. His band set up a village they named Pasuga (Big Cedar), located on an ancient earthwork mound built by an earlier indigenous culture. After fighting well as a young warrior against the raiding Comanche in that region, Zhin-gawa-ca was given a new name, Manka-Chonka, meaning Black Dog. It was customary for the Osage to be given new names to reflect such major passages in life.

== Chief ==
Black Dog was a contemporary of, and shared power in the tribe with, two other noted chiefs: Clermont (Claremore) (Note: The man for whom Claremore, Oklahoma was named. There are several variations of his name.) and Pawhuska. Osage men were typically described as very tall and physically well-built. Black Dog was even more imposing than most, since he was described as standing 7 feet 5 inches (226 cm) tall and weighing 430 pounds (200 kg). He was reportedly blind in his left eye. He is believed to have led one of the larger bands.

His men completed what became known as the Black Dog Trail by 1803. It started from their winter territory east of Baxter Springs in Kansas and extended southwest to their summer hunting grounds at the Great Salt Plains in present-day Alfalfa County, Oklahoma. The Osage regularly stopped at the springs for healing on their way to summer hunting grounds. They made the trail by clearing it of brush and large rocks, and constructing earthen ramps to the fords. Wide enough for eight horsemen to ride abreast, the trail was the first improved road in Kansas and Oklahoma.

The band had a village known as Pasuga, "Big Cedar", built on an earthwork mound near what later developed as Claremore, Oklahoma. Osage tradition credits Black Dog I with having constructed a cave near his village on Claremore Mound. The cave was large enough to conceal the nearly 500 members of his band and they stocked it with enough food to survive for a year. The cave later provided a hiding place for the remaining residents of Pasuga to escape being massacred by Cherokee during the so-called Battle of Claremore Mound in 1817.

Black Dog I had one son, known as an adult as Black Dog II (1827-1910). He later became a chief among the Osage. Many sources refer to the father as Black Dog I and the son as Black Dog II. The son reportedly became chief in 1870. Black Dog II was a signatory of the 1870 Drum Creek Treaty.

== See also ==
- Battle of Claremore Mound
