= Claremore Auto Dealership =

Building in Oklahoma, US

- U.S. National Register of Historic Places
- Location within Oklahoma
- Location: 625 W. Will Rogers Blvd., Claremore, Oklahoma
- Coordinates: 36°18′46″N 95°37′02″W
- Area: less than one acre
- Built: 1930
- Architectural style: Art Deco
- MPS: Route 66 in Oklahoma MPS
- NRHP reference No.: 95000042
- Added to NRHP: February 23, 1995

The Claremore Auto Dealership, at 625 W. Will Rogers Blvd. in Claremore, Oklahoma, was a historic Art Deco-style building built in 1930. It was listed on the National Register of Historic Places in 1995.

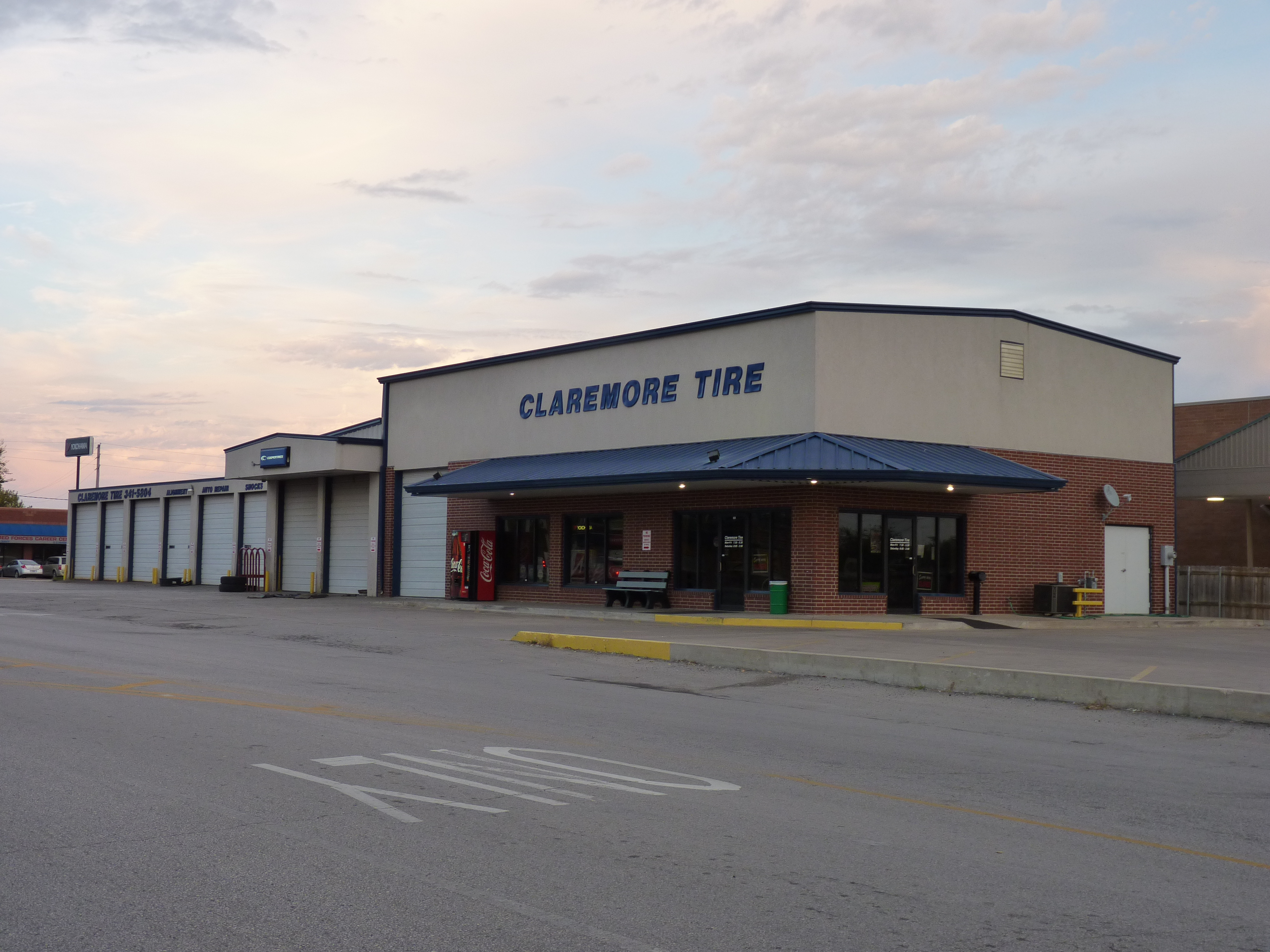
Different building on the site in 2010

The historic building appears to have been demolished, because the outward appearance of the building on the site, as photographed in 2010, is completely different.

It has also been known as Claremore Tire Company.
