= Claremore (Osage chief) =

Chief name

Claremore is the English name of several Tsi shu Osage hereditary chiefs. Their names have been translated variously as "Arrow Going Home" and "Moving Hawk". They have been transliterated in many ways, such as Gthi Mon, Gra-mo'n, Grahmoie, Glarmore, and more. To Europeans, they were commonly known as Clermont, Clairmont, Clarmont, and Clamore. They had more names as well.

== Claremore I ==
At the time Osages had two Grand chiefs co-ruling together, one from the Tsi shu section and one from the Hun kah section. As Grand Tsi-shu chief his co-chief was Tracks Far Away. Tracks Far Away later co-ruled with White Hair I. Claremore I had married off his oldest sister to Kaw chief, White Plume. He died in 1794 or early 1795.

== Claremore II ==
The Little Old Men, a priesthood and council of the Osage Nation, were in charge of bringing chiefs into power. However, they almost always chose the eldest living son of the former chief. It is said that they fretted over Claremore I's temper during their political climate and were afraid Claremore II would be the same or worse. As such, they chose White Hair I instead. This caused a semi-dissolution of the tribe (or nearly so), with Claremore going off to create the Arkansas band and White Hair leading the remaining Osages. Because he formed his own village, he was named Town Maker. Tracks Far Away was still ruling as Grand Hun Kah chief. Tracks Far Away may have helped influence the decision to prevent Claremore II from becoming Grand Tsi Shu chief. He was his maternal uncle, which meant that Tracks Far Away was like a father to him. In these times, Osage culture demanded that the oldest maternal uncle of a boy teach him all the necessities he needed to know. So it was upon Tracks Far Away to treat him like a son, so he would have known him well. Tracks Far Away continued his co-rule with Pawhuska I.

During a seasonal hunt in June 1817, a massacre occurred in one of his villages. Osages took their fit warriors and women during their bison hunts, temporarily leaving behind their permanent villages. The elderly, mothers with small kids, and the sick stay in the village. Warriors are typically days or weeks away. During this time, several tribes and white settlers had been called by a Cherokee chief to attack. This massacre was known as the Battle of Claremore Mound.

Claremore II died in a village called Those Who Came To The River in May 1828.

== Claremore III ==
Known to have moved to Kansas in 1833.
