= Las Vegas Tribe of Paiute Indians of the Las Vegas Indian Colony =

Las Vegas Tribe of Paiute Indians
Nuvagantucimi

Total population
- 71 (in 1992)

Regions with significant populations
- United States (Nevada)

Languages
- English, Southern Paiute

Religion
- Traditional tribal religion, previously Ghost Dance

Related ethnic groups
- Other Southern Paiute tribes, Chemehuevi

The Las Vegas Tribe of Paiute Indians of the Las Vegas Indian Colony (Ute-Southern Paiute: Nuvagantucimi, "people of "where snow sits" (i.e. Charleston Peak) is a federally recognized tribe of Southern Paiute Indians in Southern Nevada.

== Reservation ==
Location of the Las Vegas Indian Colony

The Las Vegas Paiute Tribe has a reservation, the Las Vegas Indian Colony, at 36°21′02″N 115°20′27″W in Clark County adjacent to the northwest corner of Las Vegas. The reservation was first established in 1911 and today is 3,850 acres (1,560 ha) large. In 1992, 52 tribal members lived on the reservation and 71 people were enrolled in the tribe.

== History ==
The tribe is descended from the Tudinu or "Desert People", ancestors of most of the tribes of Southern Paiutes whose traditional territory is the lower Colorado River valley as well as the mountains and arroyos of the Mojave Desert in Nevada, California and Utah. Beginning in the early 19th century, non-native settlers moved into the area, resulting in the displacement of the local tribe from both its water-rich lowland winter and tree-rich mountainous summer campgrounds.

Significant permanent settlement began after 1855, when the area was annexed to the United States. That same year, a mission of the Church of Jesus Christ of Latter-day Saints (LDS Church) built a fort at the Las Vegas Springs with the dual purpose of converting the Paiutes and acting as a node on a Salt Lake-to-the-sea shipping route. Although the mission was short-lived, it marked the beginning of permanent American settlement at the site when, ten years later, the fort was rebuilt, reinhabited and re-christened the Las Vegas Rancho.

Settlement increased after William A. Clark took ownership of much of the tribe's land, built the San Pedro, Los Angeles and Salt Lake Railroad through it and established the town of Las Vegas adjacent to the region's most significant water source. Seeing the tribe's dispossession, on December 30, 1911, Helen J. Stewart, owner of the pre-railroad Las Vegas Rancho, deeded 10 acres (4.0 ha) of spring-fed downtown Las Vegas land to the Paiutes, creating the Las Vegas Indian Colony. Until 1983, this was the tribe's only communal land, forming a small "town within a town" in downtown Las Vegas.

The tribe ratified its constitution and bylaws on July 22, 1970. They were federally recognized under the Indian Reorganization Act. In 1983, Congress returned to the tribe 3,800 acres (1,500 ha) of land between the eastern slopes of Mount Charleston in the Spring Mountains and the western flanks of the Sheep Range. This land is now known as the Snow Mountain Reservation of the Las Vegas Tribe of Paiute Indians.

== Today ==
The Las Vegas Tribe of Paiute Indians currently operates a minimart, a cannabis dispensary, two smoke shops; a health and human services program; the Las Vegas Paiute Police Department, with 10 law enforcement officers, and the Las Vegas Paiute Golf Resort, located northwest of Las Vegas. The tribe hosts the Annual Snow Mountain Pow Wow every Memorial Day weekend.

The tribal headquarters is located in Las Vegas. The tribe is governed by a seven-person tribal council.

== Notable tribal citizens ==
- Fawn Douglas, artist and co-founder of Nuwu Art
