= Claremore High School =

Public school in Claremore, Oklahoma, US

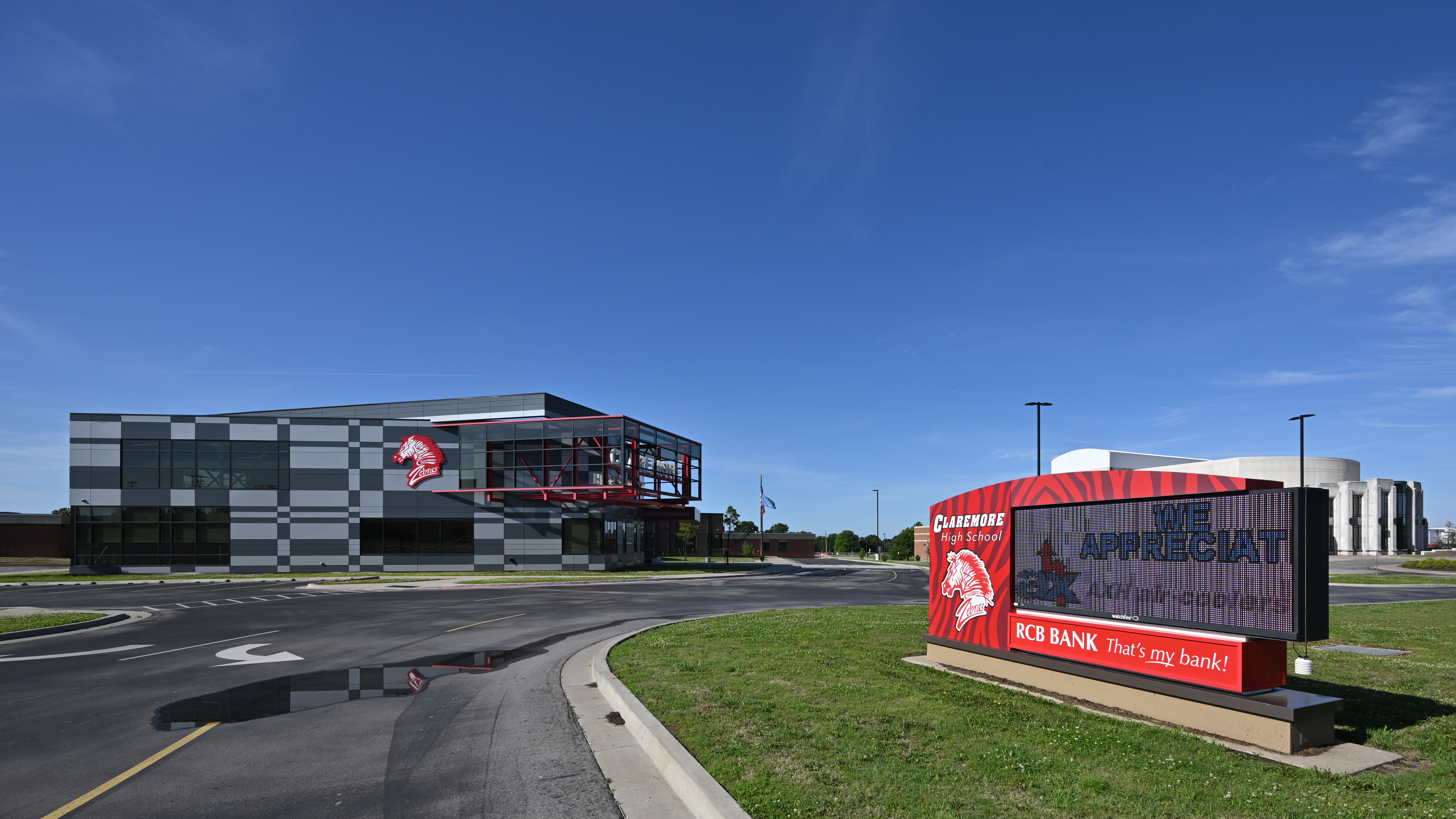

Location
- 201 E. Stuart Roosa Avenue; Claremore, Oklahoma 74019; United States; 36.3288°N 95.6036°W

Information
- Type: Co-educational, public, secondary
- Motto: "Excellence for all excellence from all"
- Established: c. 1920
- School district: Claremore Public Schools
- Authority: OSDE
- Principal: Brooke Lee
- Staff: 74.00 (FTE)
- Enrollment: 1,271 (2023-2024)
- Student to teacher ratio: 17.18
- Colors: Red, black, and white
- Mascot: Zebra
- National ranking: 6,981
- Website: www.claremore.k12.ok.us/o/chs

Claremore High School is a public high school located in Claremore, Oklahoma, United States.

== History ==
The high school located on 201 E. Stuart Roosa began to be built in 1972. The construction team began working on "the pit" during this time. The name of the pit has an unknown origin, but derives from the floor which is recessed into the ground made for tables and chairs. The structure of the specific area is an H-block which splits the 100, 200, 300, and 400 hall into the shape of a capital H.

In 1997, construction began on the 600 hall, and it was not finished until 2002. In 2008, the 900 hall, also known as the freshman center, was completed. The same year, the 700 hall was established in the Robson Performing Arts Center.

In 2021, the most recent addition to the school was added, the STEM building. It serves the new 500 hall, which is a collection of classrooms themed around technology and engineering. This extended the original main entrance, making it difficult to see.

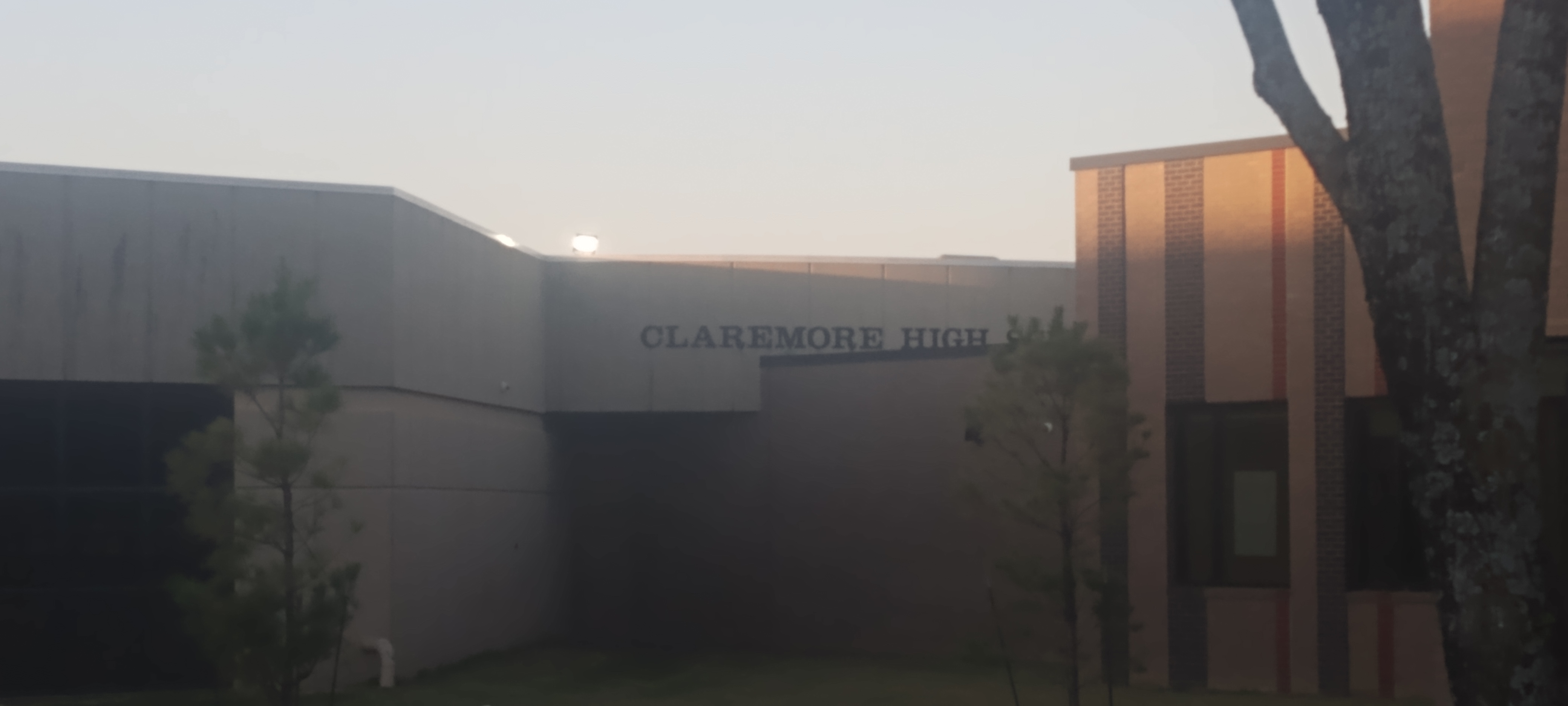
Original Claremore High School entrance, which is inaccessible due to an extension built in 2021.

== Administration ==
As of 14 August 2024, Brooke Lee is the head principal. Other faculty include:

- Derek Short, assistant principal - last names O-Z
- Meranda Golbek, assistant principal - last names A-F
- Bryan Warren, assistant principal - last names G-N

== Academics ==
Claremore High School uses the block scheduling method of class organization. Each student is enrolled in four classes per semester (two blocks per semester, two semesters per year), rather than six or seven. One block equals one half credit, and two blocks equal one whole credit.

The high school offers numerous Advanced Placement courses, including biology, calculus AB/BC, chemistry, English language and composition, English literature and composition, European history, Music theory, psychology, Spanish language, Spanish literature, statistics, studio art, and US history.

Junior and senior students may also be enrolled in a morning or afternoon session at one of the Northeast Tech centers.

Some classes, including drama, choir, and band, take place in the Robson Performing Arts Center.

== Notable alumni ==
- Stuart A. Roosa, astronaut
- Quentin Skinner, NFL wide receiver for the New York Jets
- Helen Walton, wife of Walmart founder
- Matt Whatley, professional baseball player
