= Battle of Claremore Mound =

Battle in Indian Territory between the Osage and Cherokee Indians

The Battle of Claremore Mound, also known as the Battle of the Strawberry Moon, or the Claremore Mound Massacre, was one of the chief battles of the war between the Osage and Cherokee Indians. It occurred in June 1817, (Note: May's article in the Encyclopedia of Oklahoma History and Culture states that the battle occurred in the month of November, but this conflicts with other sources that indicate the battle occurred in the Strawberry Moon, which is normally in June.) when a band of Western Cherokee and their allies under Chief Spring Frog (Too-an-tuh) attacked Pasuga, an Osage village at the foot of Claremore Mound (in present-day Rogers County, Oklahoma). The village was nearly empty; only women, children, and the very sick and elderly remained there. Most of the village was then away on a seasonal hunt that often lasted three to four months. The Cherokee killed or captured every remaining member of Chief Clermont's band and destroyed everything they could not carry away. Historians consider it one of the bloodiest Native American massacres in modern history.

== Conflict between Osage and Cherokee ==
On November 10, 1808, at Fort Osage, Missouri, the Osage Nation made a treaty with the United States, ceding all of its land east of a line that ran south from Fort Clark to the Arkansas River and all of its land west of the Missouri River. (Note: This cession covered a large part of the present state of Missouri and the northern part of the present state of Arkansas.) The land reserved to the Osage Nation was further reduced by treaties signed at St. Louis (June 2, 1825, Fort Gibson (January 11, 1839) and Canville, Kansas (September 29, 1865).

According to Eaton, the Osage established two main villages about 1800, when they migrated to the area between the Verdigris and Grand Rivers. These were called Pasona (near present-day Claremore, Oklahoma) and Pasuga (at the foot of Claremore Mound). (Note: Pasona was the home village of Osage chief, Black Dog, and Pasuga was the home of Osage war chief, Clermont, and his family of four wives and 37 children.)

In the early 1800s, a portion of the Cherokee people, who had been living in the Southeastern United States, had begun moving to land historically claimed by other tribes west of the Mississippi River. These were those Cherokees referred to as the Old Settlers, or Western Cherokee. This produced a long period of conflict between the Cherokee migrants and the Osage. The Osage tribes had dominated the Central Plains area in today's Kansas, Missouri, Oklahoma, and Arkansas. The Osage often took captives (mostly women and children), and killing others, trying to drive out the invaders. Cherokees retaliated in kind, but were ineffective at stopping the raids. By 1817, an estimated 3000 Western Cherokees had settled in the area known as Lovely's Purchase in the Arkansas district of the Missouri Territory.

== The Cherokee-led attack ==
In January 1817, the Arkansas Cherokee began planning a retaliatory attack against the Osage and began asking their relatives from the east to aid them in a battle against the Osage. They also asked for help from the Choctaw, Chickasaw, Delaware, Shawnee and others, including Whites.

The Cherokee knew that Osage men left their villages lightly guarded during the Strawberry Moon to go on a long-distance hunt for bison. (Note: North American natives had given this name to the month of June because that was the time for picking wild strawberries.) Therefore, this would be the most opportune time to attack.

The Cherokee were enraged by the treatment they had endured at the hands of the Osage, which helped offset the greater numbers of the Osage had. The Cherokee had another advantage, as they had acquired more modern weapons—rifles—and were well-experienced in their use. This finally gave them a match in force against the Osage tribe, who had acquired guns in the 1600s from their trading with the French and with which all warriors were well acquainted.

Location of the battle in present-day Oklahoma

Some 500 Cherokee, along with a number of Choctaw, Chickasaw, and Whites, convened at a place on the Arkansas River. (The modern city of Russellville, Arkansas, developed here.) They traveled upriver into Indian Territory and went overland to the Osage villages. (Note: According to the Encyclopedia of Oklahoma History and Culture, the attacking force totaled about 700 men.) After luring a representative of the Southern Osage away from the village, the invading party attacked, killing 38 Osage and taking 104 captives. (Note: According to May's article, the chief and most of his men had gone from the villages to hunt bison when the attack occurred. The last leg of the journey was by night. The attackers arrived at Pasona about midnight, only to find the village deserted. They pressed on toward Pasuga, which they reached before dawn. Surprising the dozing guards, the attackers charged into the village, routing the inhabitants. A massacre ensued, continuing well into the day. When the defense broke, the villagers tried to escape across the Verdigris River. According to Eaton, the Cherokees pursued their prey for almost two days. According to May, the attackers killed 80 Osage, including 69 women and children, took 100 captives, then burned the village.) According to Eaton, Chief Clermont was present at the time of the attack and was killed during the fighting. He was later buried on Claremore Mound. Another source indicates that Pasuga was attacked first, and that the inhabitants of Pasona had been alerted by the sounds and smells of smoke when the marauders burned the village. The Pasugans hid in a cave previously discovered and prepared as a hideout by Black Dog, who had gone on the buffalo hunt. Thus, they survived the raid on their village and could care for the few survivors from Pasuga.

== The aftermath ==
Most of the Osage warriors had been away on a hunt when their village was attacked. In an attempt to maintain peace with the U.S. government, they did not retaliate immediately. Sometime later (1820), the Cherokee followed the Osage further up the river. The Osage knew they were coming and were ready and had gathered numbers and allies. The Osage decimated the Cherokee. Instead of cowing the Osage, the defeat at Claremore Mound stirred them to greater fury. The bitter frontier war continued in unabated with Osage's raiding and killing indiscriminately as they retreated down the river, their Osage sons (Mad Buffalo) and grandsons were waiting in ambush. At every Cherokee retreat, an Osage ambush party of Claremore descent was waiting to slaughter the fleeing Cherokees. For 20 years, the descendants of Claremore attacked the Cherokees. The Osage who were taken captive were given to the Eastern Cherokee as payment for their contributions in the battle. In December of the same year, construction began on Fort Smith between the Cherokee and Osage settlements. The following summer, the U.S. forced the Osage to cede more land to the Cherokee, who were settling in the area, apparently because of their victories after the Battle of Claremore Mound.

In December 1818, the U.S. government began construction of a fort on the Arkansas River, close to the western border of Arkansas Territory. When completed, Fort Smith was staffed with troops whose primary mission was to prevent further hostilities between the Osage and the Western Cherokee. In 1824, this function was transferred to Fort Gibson, which was built near the confluence of the Grand and Verdigris Rivers in Indian Territory. Fort Smith was abandoned until a replacement was constructed several years later.

The Osage continued to live in the area until they moved to the Osage Reservation in 1839.

== Site marker ==
The Oklahoma Historical Society erected a marker at the site of the battle, on State Highway 88, about 4.2 miles (6.8 km) north of the Will Rogers Memorial in Claremore. Coordinates of the marker are: 36°22.919′N 95°37.972′W.

== See also ==
- List of battles fought in Oklahoma
