= Kywin Supernaw =

American football player (born 1975)

No. 29
- Position: Defensive back

Personal information
- Born: June 2, 1975 (age 51); Claremore, Oklahoma, U.S.
- Listed height: 6 ft 1 in (1.85 m)
- Listed weight: 206 lb (93 kg)

Career information
- High school: Skiatook (Skiatook, Oklahoma)
- College: Indiana
- NFL draft: 1998: undrafted

Career history
- Detroit Lions (1998–2001)
- Stats at Pro Football Reference

Kywin Supernaw (born June 2, 1975) is an American former professional football defensive back who played three seasons with the Detroit Lions of the National Football League (NFL). He played college football at Northeastern Oklahoma A&M College and Indiana University Bloomington.

== Early life and college ==
Kywin Supernaw was born on June 2, 1975, in Claremore, Oklahoma. He attended Skiatook High School in Skiatook, Oklahoma. His jersey was retired by Skiatook High in 2010.

Supernaw first played college football at Northeastern Oklahoma A&M College. He later transferred to play for the Indiana Hoosiers of Indiana University Bloomington, where he was a two-year letterman from 1996 to 1997. He recorded two interceptions for 69 yards and one touchdown in 1996, and three interceptions for 120 yards and one touchdown in 1997.

== Professional career ==
Supernaw signed with the Detroit Lions on April 24, 1998, after going undrafted in the 1998 NFL draft. He was released on August 30 but signed to the team's practice squad on September 1. He was promoted to the active roster on December 1, 1998, and played in two games during the 1998 season. Supernaw also appeared in two games in 1999 before being placed on injured reserve on October 14, 1999. He played in 13 games, starting three, during the 2000 season, posting 22 solo tackles and 13 assisted tackles. He missed the entire 2001 season after undergoing neck surgery. Supernaw became a free agent after the season but was not re-signed by the Lions.
