= Claremore, Oklahoma =

City in Oklahoma, US

- City
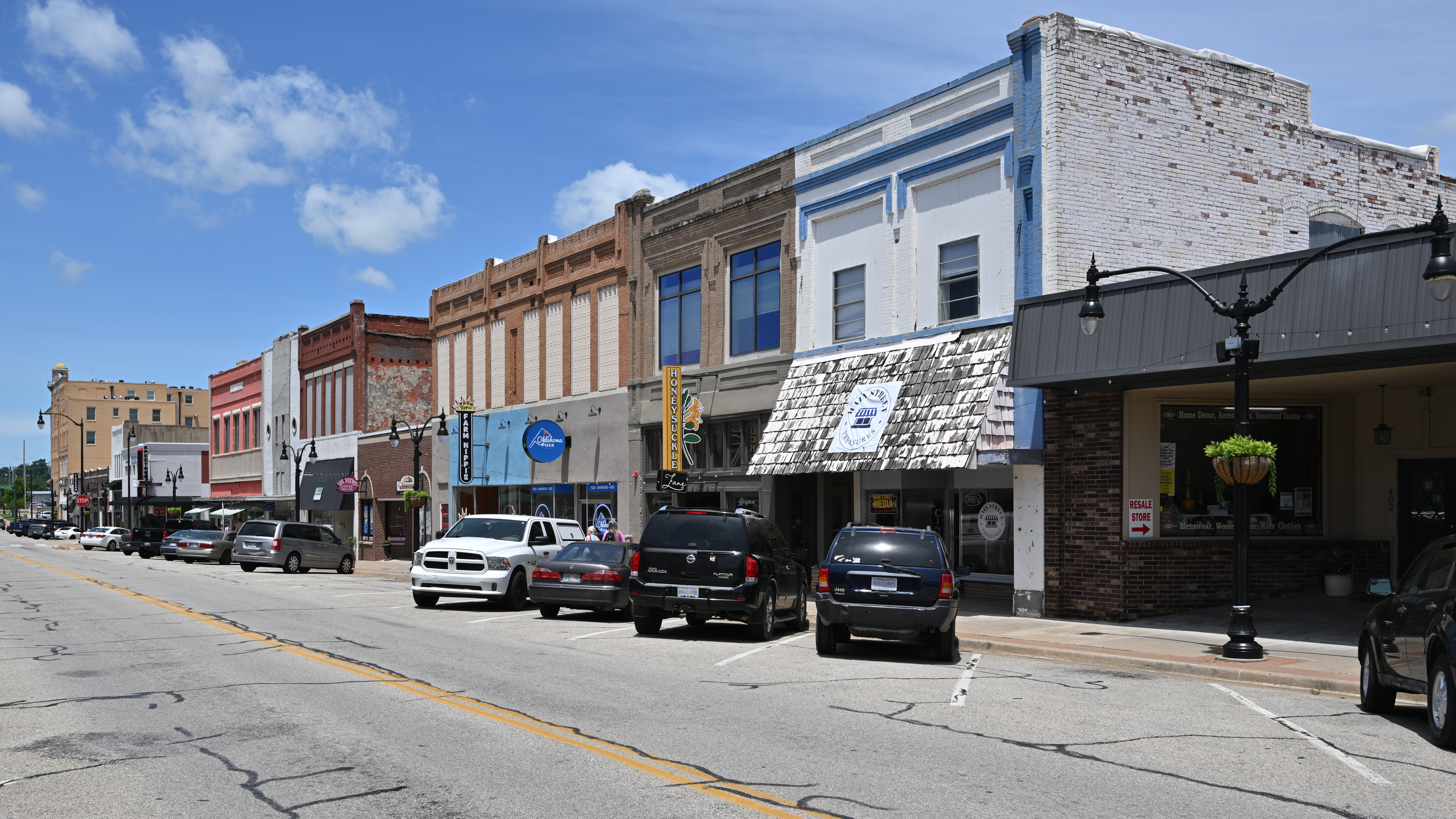
- Downtown Claremore
- Motto: "New Vision. Clear Opportunities."
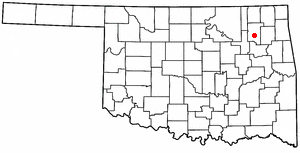
- Location in the state of Oklahoma

- Location in the United States
- Coordinates: 36°18′55″N 95°36′32″W
- Country: United States
- State: Oklahoma
- County: Rogers
- Incorporated: 1883

Government
  - Mayor: Debbie Long

Area
  - Total: 15.26 sq mi (39.53 km^{2})
  - Land: 15.01 sq mi (38.87 km^{2})
  - Water: 0.25 sq mi (0.66 km^{2})
- Elevation: 610 ft (190 m)

Population (2020)
  - Total: 19,580
  - Density: 1,304.6/sq mi (503.71/km^{2})
- Time zone: UTC-6 (CST)
  - Summer (DST): UTC-5 (CDT)
- ZIP codes: 74017, 74018, 74019
- Area codes: 539/918
- FIPS code: 40-14700
- GNIS feature ID: 2409466
- Website: claremore.com

Claremore is a city in and the county seat of Rogers County in northeastern Oklahoma, United States. Its population was 19,580 at the 2020 census, a 5.4% increase over the 18,581 recorded in 2010. Located in the foothills of the Ozark Mountains, it is home of Rogers State University, and is part of the Tulsa metropolitan area.

This area was part of the territory of the Osage, but they were forced out under a treaty with the United States. During the Indian Removal period and until statehood, this area was a reserve of the Cherokee Nation, which had been removed from its territory in the Southeastern United States. This was within what was known as the Cherokees' Cooweescoowee District.

== History ==
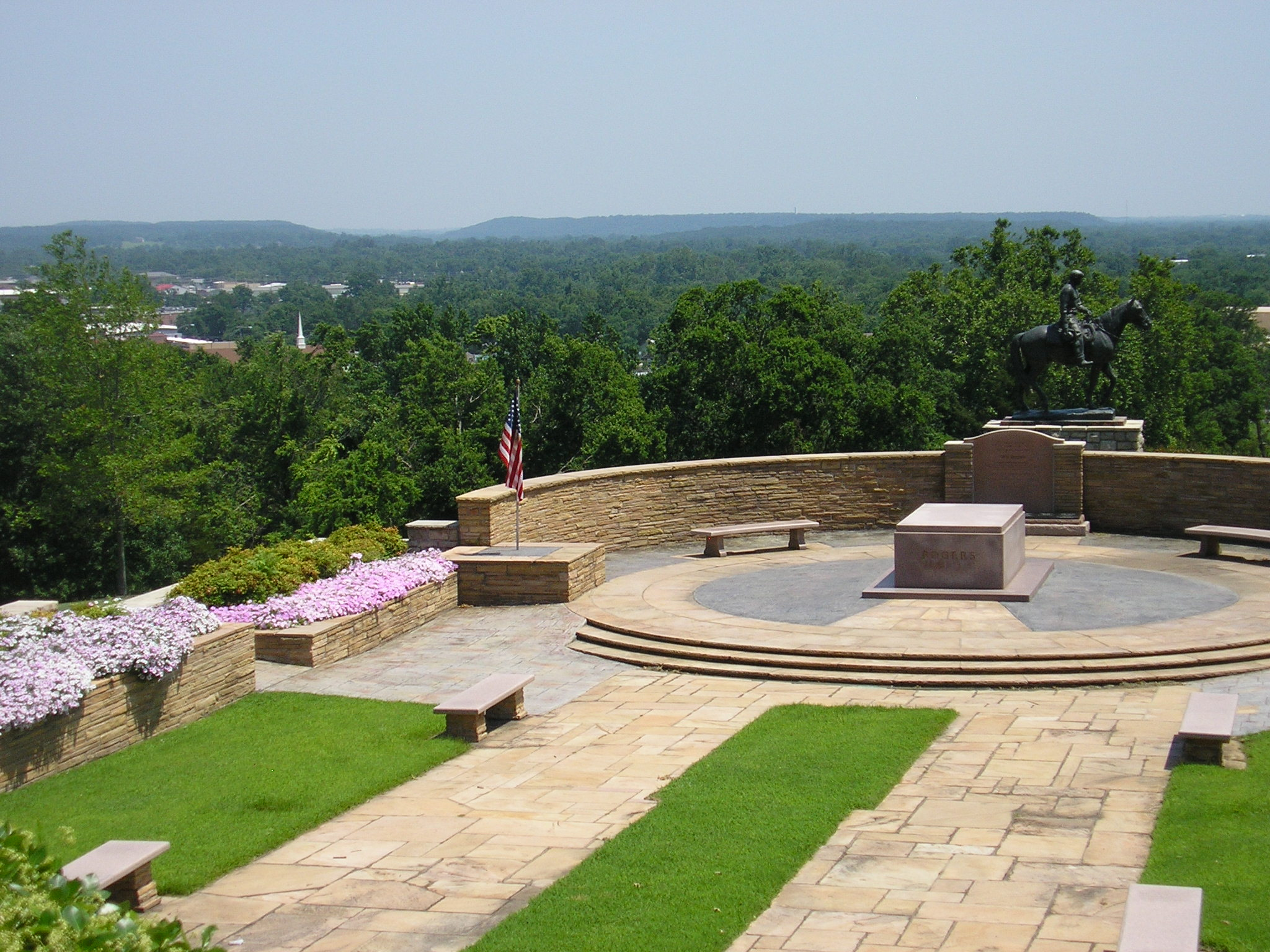
The Will Rogers Memorial overlooks Claremore's position in the foothills of the Ozark Mountains.

Around 1802, bands of Osage Indians settled in this area of what is now northeastern Oklahoma. Black Dog was the chief of a band that settled at Pasona, where Claremore later developed. He shared power with chiefs Clermont (or Claremore), and Pawhuska. Clermont, named by French traders, settled with his band in a village known as Pasuga, meaning "Big Cedar", which was located on an ancient platform earthwork mound in this area.

The Osage village of Pasuga was destroyed by Cherokee in June 1817, during the Battle of Claremore Mound, also known as the Battle of the Strawberry Moon. These Western Cherokee had moved into the region from the Southeastern United States and were perpetually competing with the Osage, who looked down on them. At the time of the attack, most of the men were out of the villages to hunt bison on the plains. The Cherokee killed the men in the village, and took more than 100 women and children captive, selling them to Eastern Cherokee. Accounts differ as to whether Chief Clermont was killed in the raid.

After the Indian Removal Act of 1830 was passed by Congress, this area was designated as part of Indian Territory and the Cherokee Nation was assigned much of this territory. Claremore and the mound were within a part of the Cooweescoowee District in the northwestern part of the Cherokee Nation.

The Rogers family, for whom the county is named, was among the first European-American settlers. Clem Rogers, father of the famous entertainer Will Rogers, was born of mixed-blood parents in the Cherokee Nation, as was his wife. He moved to the county in 1856 and acquired lands for his Dog Iron Ranch that eventually consisted of more than 60,000 acres (240 km^{2}). The Clem Rogers home (Will Rogers' birthplace) still stands outside Oologah, and is considered an important historical site. (Note: Dog Iron Ranch was merged with the Will Rogers Memorial Library in 2016; both are now managed by the Oklahoma State Historical Society.) Clem Rogers was a major advocate of Oklahoma statehood; he was the oldest delegate to the state's Constitutional Convention in 1907 at age 69. Other members of his family and he were buried at the Will Rogers Memorial.

A post office was established on June 25, 1874. The coming of railways to Indian Territory was the driving factor in early growth. Two early lines intersected in the center of town. The town changed the spelling of its name from Clermont to Claremore on September 19, 1882. A clerk recording the town as having a post office had spelled the name incorrectly, and it stuck. The town was incorporated in the Cherokee Nation on May 2, 1903. newspaper, the Claremore Daily Progress, was founded in 1893 by cowboy Joe Klein and is still published daily. It is the oldest business in Rogers County.

Growth was aided by the popularity of sulfur springs among Americans in the late 19th and early 20th centuries. They believed bathing in such springs to have medical benefits. George Eaton had settled with his family in the Claremore area in 1874 and conducted farming and cattle raising. He later branched into the mercantile business, real estate, and oil exploration. While drilling just east of Claremore in 1903, Easton struck an underground pool of water that smelled of sulfur. Local physician Dr. W. G. Williams tested the water and marketed it as a cure. Known as "Radium Water", it contained no radium, but hydrogen sulfide and sulfur compounds that were believed to make it medically useful. Eaton built a bath house and promoted the pool area as Radium Town. Radium Town was centered on 9th Street between Seminole and Dorothy. Bath houses were built by promoters all over this area of Claremore, and for a time attracted travelers and tourists for the waters. Only one was still standing as of 2008. The first hospital was established in the early 1900s along what is now known as Will Rogers Boulevard or Oklahoma State Highway 20. The building is standing and is currently being renovated.

The town has many historic homes and other buildings, with several located in the old business district. In 2002, Claremore received a grant from the state's Oklahoma Main Street program to redevelop its business district with improved urban design and enhancement of historic properties. Renovation work on the downtown was completed in 2007. On July 9, 2020, the Supreme Court of the United States determined in McGirt v. Oklahoma that the reservations of the Five Tribes, comprising much of Eastern Oklahoma, were never disestablished by Congress, thus are still "Indian Country" for the purposes of criminal law.

On the night of May 25, 2024, an EF3 tornado impacted Claremore and caused considerable damage to the city and the areas surrounding it.

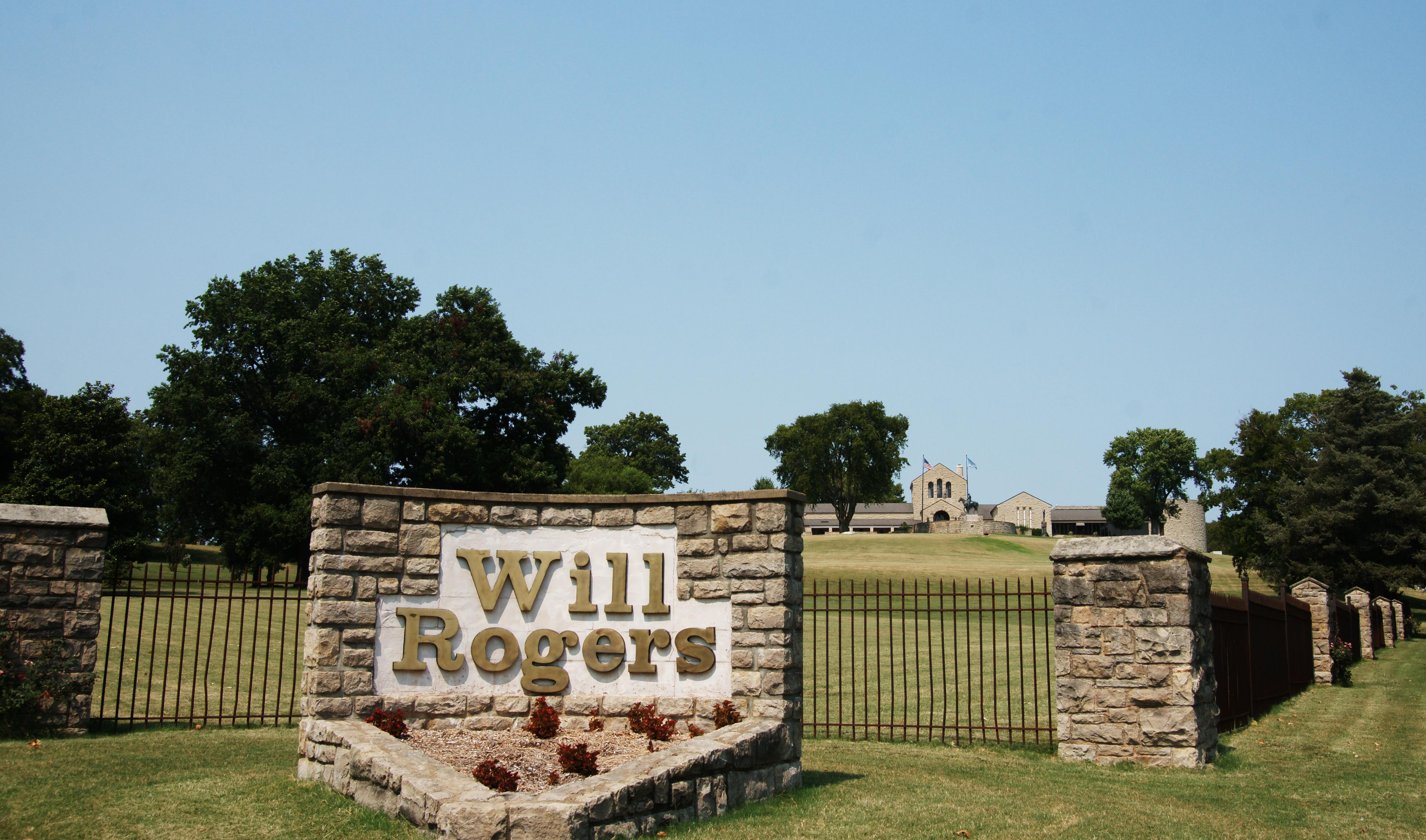
Will Rogers Memorial Museum in Claremore, Oklahoma 2021091100008

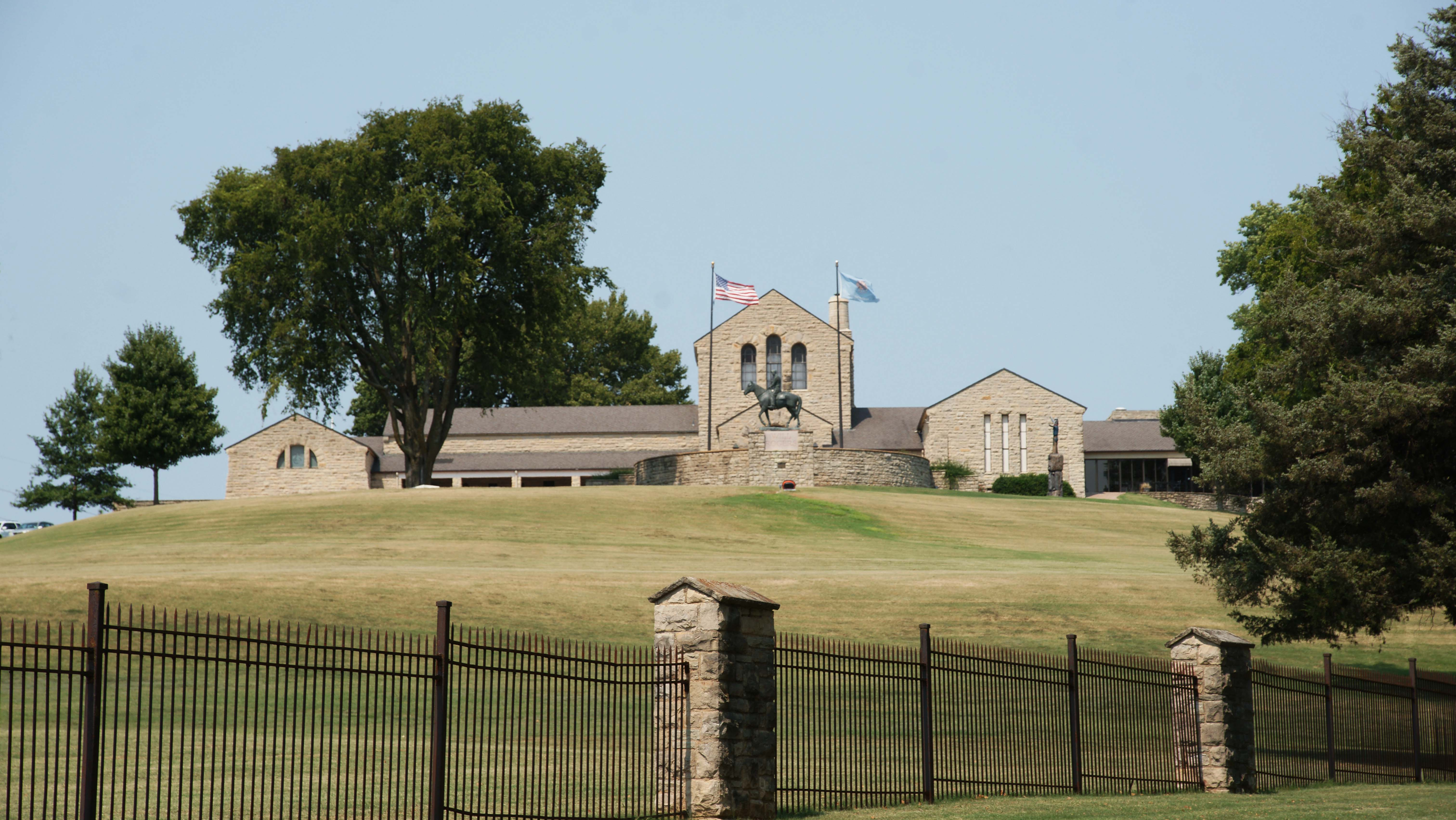
Will Rogers Memorial Museum in Claremore, Oklahoma 2021091100011

On February 17, 2026 Darren Blanchard, a Claremore resident, was arrested for trespassing after he exceeded his three-minute public comment time limit by about 30 seconds at a public meeting about AI data center development. After he requested body camera footage from the meeting, the city tried to charge him over $17,000 for the footage and related work. The justification it gave was "to ensure that all information which must be withheld relating to members of the public and the City’s personnel is redacted in order to protect their privacy." The Oklahoma office of the Attorney General commanded the City of Claremore to release the footage without charge since this was a public meeting with no right to privacy and because the city had not posted a schedule of fees as required by the Oklahoma Open Records Act.

== In popular culture ==
The Rodgers and Hammerstein musical Oklahoma! is set in Claremore and the surrounding area, in 1906 (the year before Oklahoma became a state); it was based on the play Green Grow the Lilacs by playwright Lynn Riggs, who grew up on a farm in the Claremore area. The Quantum Leap season-three episode "8½ Months" is also set near Claremore. The movie Where the Heart Is fictionally portrays Rogers County and the area surrounding Claremore.

Claremore was featured in the Supernatural season-14 episode "Nightmare Logic", where Maggie tracks a ghoul to the town.

== Geography ==
According to the United States Census Bureau, the town has a total area of 12.3 square miles (32 km^{2}), of which 0.2 sq mi (0.52 km^{2}) (1.96%) is covered by water.

The city is located in Green Country, a popular nickname and marketing label for northeast Oklahoma that stems from the region's green vegetation and relatively high number of hills and lakes, compared to central and western areas of Oklahoma. Claremore lies near the Verdigris River, with undulating terrain producing hills and valleys. The city's primary water sources are the Claremore and Oologah Lakes, both within the drainage basin of the Verdigris River.

=== Climate ===
Claremore experiences a humid subtropical climate with cold winters and hot summers.

Climate data for Claremore, Oklahoma
Month	Jan	Feb	Mar	Apr	May	Jun	Jul	Aug	Sep	Oct	Nov	Dec	Year
Mean daily maximum °F (°C)	44.8 (7.1)	50.3 (10.2)	60.2 (15.7)	71.2 (21.8)	78.3 (25.7)	86.3 (30.2)	92.8 (33.8)	92.0 (33.3)	83.6 (28.7)	73.6 (23.1)	60.5 (15.8)	48.8 (9.3)	70.2 (21.2)
Mean daily minimum °F (°C)	21.2 (−6.0)	26.1 (−3.3)	35.7 (2.1)	46.8 (8.2)	55.7 (13.2)	64.9 (18.3)	69.5 (20.8)	67.3 (19.6)	60.4 (15.8)	47.2 (8.4)	36.5 (2.5)	26.0 (−3.3)	46.4 (8.0)
Average precipitation inches (mm)	1.6 (41)	2.0 (51)	3.6 (91)	3.6 (91)	4.6 (120)	4.6 (120)	3.0 (76)	3.1 (79)	4.5 (110)	3.6 (91)	3.2 (81)	2.2 (56)	39.4 (1,000)
Source 1: weather.com
Source 2: Weatherbase.com

== Transportation ==
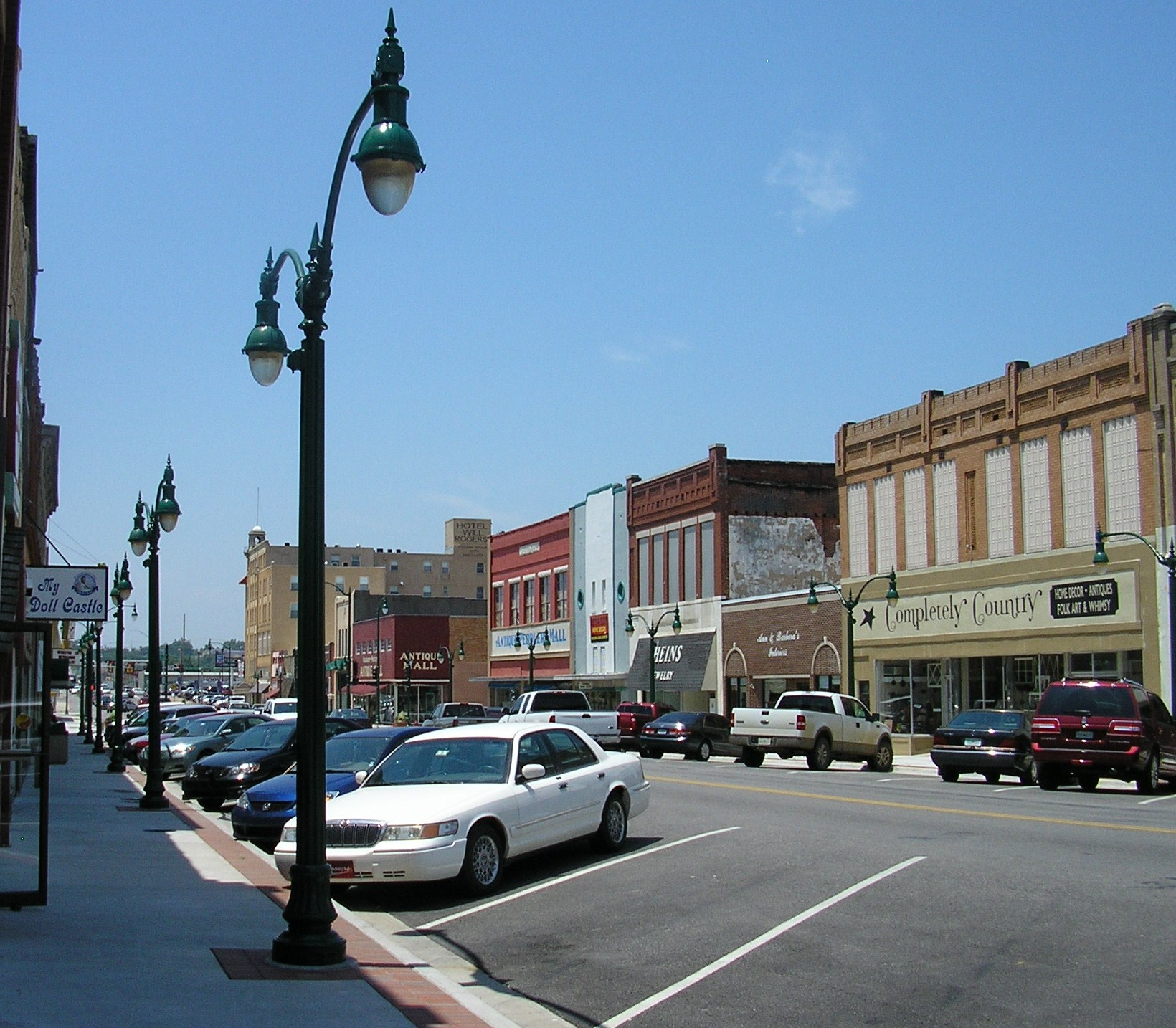
Downtown Claremore

Claremore is a major intersection of heavily traveled highways. Interstate 44 crosses the town to its southeast. State Highway 66 (historic US-66) was designated along with one of the main east–west roads of the town. State Highway 88 and State Highway 20 intersect within the town.

Two railroad lines, the Kansas and Arkansas Valley Railway line (now owned by Union Pacific) and the St. Louis-San Francisco Railway or "Frisco" line (now owned by BNSF) intersect in Claremore. The traffic problems resulting from the intersection of two major national rail lines have led to discussions among town officials about how best to improve traffic flow.

Claremore Regional Airport (KGCM; FAA ID GCM), is located about 7 miles east of Claremore, and features a paved 5200 x 75 ft. runway.

Commercial air transportation is available out of Tulsa International Airport, about 22 miles southwest.

== Demographics ==
Historical population
Census	Pop.	Note	%±
1900	855		—
1910	2,866		235.2%
1920	3,435		19.9%
1930	3,720		8.3%
1940	4,134		11.1%
1950	5,494		32.9%
1960	6,639		20.8%
1970	9,084		36.8%
1980	12,085		33.0%
1990	13,280		9.9%
2000	15,873		19.5%
2010	18,581		17.1%
2020	19,580		5.4%

=== 2020 census ===
As of the 2020 census, Claremore had a population of 19,580. The median age was 36.6 years; 21.5% of residents were under 18 and 19.5% were 65 or older. For every 100 females, there were 92.3 males, and for every 100 females 18 and over, there were 89.6 males 18 and over.

Almost all of the residents lived in urban areas, while 0.7% lived in rural areas.

Of the 7,661 households in Claremore, 30.2% had children under 18 living in them, 39.6% were married-couple households, 19.4% were households with a male householder and no spouse or partner present, and 33.1% were households with a female householder and no spouse or partner present. About 31.4% of all households were made up of individuals, and 13.9% had someone living alone who was 65 years of age or older.

The city had 8,358 housing units, of which 8.3% were vacant. Among occupied housing units, 53.0% were owner-occupied and 47.0% were renter-occupied. The homeowner vacancy rate was 3.2% and the rental vacancy rate was 6.5%.

Racial composition as of the 2020 census
Race	Percent
White	62.5%
Black or African American	2.4%
American Indian and Alaska Native	14.7%
Asian	0.9%
Native Hawaiian and other Pacific Islander	<0.1%
Some other race	3.3%
Two or more races	16.2%
Hispanic or Latino (of any race)	7.0%

=== 2000 census ===
As of the 2000 census, 15,873 people, 6,283 households, and 4,165 families resided in the town. The population density was 1,319.4 inhabitants per square mile (509.4/km^{2}). The 6,784 housing units had an average density of 563.9/sq mi (217.7/km^{2}). The racial makeup of the town was 75.69% White, 1.99% African American, 14.31% Native American, 0.44% Asian, 0.03% Pacific Islander, 1.12% from other races, and 6.42% from two or more races. Hispanics or Latinos of any race were 3.02% of the population.

Of the 6,283 households, 33.6% had children under 18 living with them, 49.6% were married couples living together, 12.4% had a female householder with no husband present, and 33.7% were not families. About 29.7% of all households were made up of individuals, and 13.8% had someone living alone who was 65 or older. The average household size was 2.43, and the average family size was 3.02.

In the town, the age distribution was 26.7% under 18, 9.0% from 18 to 24, 27.6% from 25 to 44, 19.8% from 45 to 64, and 16.9% who were 65 or older. The median age was 36 years. For every 100 females, there were 89.5 males. For every 100 females 18 and over, there were 86.1 males.

The median income in the city for a household was $34,547 and for a family was $45,810. Males had a median income of $36,227 versus $21,742 for females. The per capita income for the town was $17,853. About 8.9% of families and 11.9% of the population were below the poverty line, including 15.4% of those under 18 and 15.0% of those 65 and older.

== Education ==
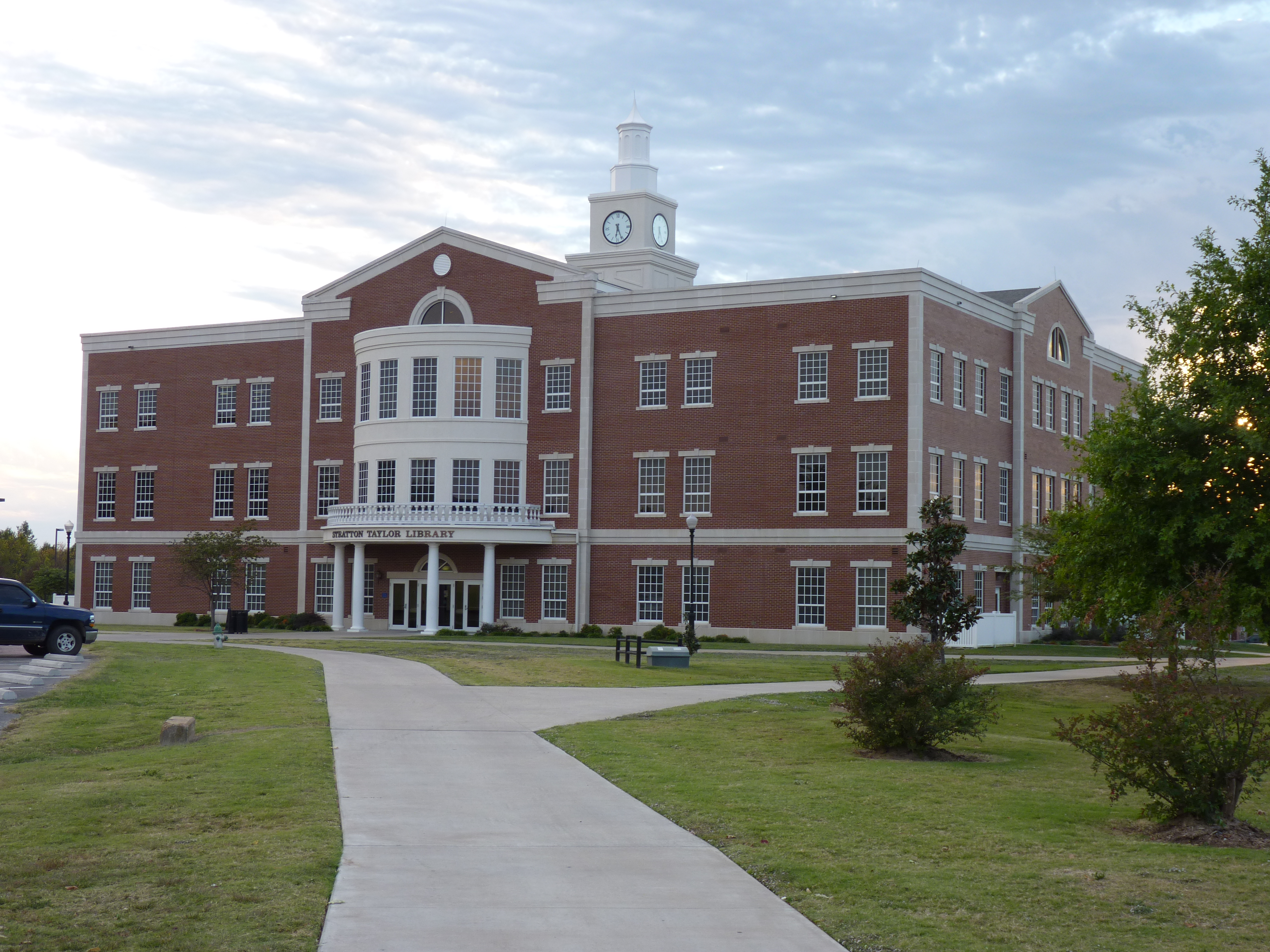
Stratton Taylor Library at Rogers State University.

Claremore is home to the main campus of Rogers State University, which grants master's, bachelor's, and associate's degrees. The university serves more than 4,300 students. It is the only public four-year university in the Tulsa metropolitan area.

Claremore is also home to one of four campuses of Northeast Tech, a vocational training school. The Claremore campus serves over 200 students and offers both full-time and short-term classes.

The public school district serving Claremore is the Claremore Independent School District, consisting of Claremore High School, Will Rogers Junior High, Catalayah Elementary, Westside Elementary, Claremont Elementary, and Stuart Roosa Elementary Schools, and the Alternative Learning Center. The first school in the Claremore area was opened to students in 1870. The first major high school was built in 1919; it was the most expensive public-school building in Oklahoma at the time. The building was used as a school for almost 80 years, until 1999. The increasing costs of maintenance of the old building forced its closure.

== Economy ==
Claremore's economy is diversified. Baker Hughes, an oil-field services company, has a large presence in the town. Together with several other large companies, it is located in Claremore Industrial Park. which is only a few miles from the Tulsa Port of Catoosa, located on the Verdigris and Arkansas Rivers. Coal mining is also an important industry; strip-style mines are operating on both the north and south sides of town.

== Media ==
Claremore has a website called moreClaremore.com, which focuses on positive community journalism. It was launched in April 2013 and centers on community events, local businesses, people, and schools. This was implemented in an effort to reverse the city's overall negative reputation with local residents, specifically in relation to its police department. The site also features the central community calendar for the area. It has an average of 40,000 visitors per month and has an active, though heavily restricted social-media presence, with more than 29,000 followers on Facebook.

The daily newspaper (and one of the oldest ongoing businesses in the county) is the Claremore Daily Progress, first published as a weekly in 1892 and as a daily in 1893. As of September 2020, the Daily Progress publishes only two print editions a week.

== National Register of Historic Places ==
As of October 2, 2026, the National Register of Historic Places lists these Claremore sites, buildings, structures, or districts as worthy of preservation for their historical significance:

(note that mauve color for #3 denotes "district" rather than a specific item)

	Name on the Register	Image	Date listed	Location	City or town	Description
1	The Belvidere	The Belvidere	March 24, 1982 (#82003696)	109 N. Chickasaw Ave. 36°18′39″N 95°36′37″W	Claremore	
2	Claremore Auto Dealership		February 23, 1995 (#95000042)	625 W. Will Rogers Boulevard; 36°18′46″N 95°37′02″W	Claremore	
3	Downtown Claremore Historic District	Downtown Claremore Historic District	September 12, 2016 (#16000623)	W. Will Rogers Blvd. bounded by Rt. 66, Muskogee Ave., 4th St. and alley between W. Will Rogers Blvd. and 2nd St. 36°18′43″N 95°36′53″W	Claremore	
4	Eastern University Preparatory School	Eastern University Preparatory School	February 19, 1982 (#82003697)	College Hill; 36°19′12″N 95°38′07″W	Claremore	
5	Mendenhall's Bath House		March 23, 1983 (#83002127)	601 E. 7th St. 36°18′39″N 95°36′02″W	Claremore	
6	Maurice Meyer Barracks	Maurice Meyer Barracks	March 1, 1982 (#82003698)	College Hill; 36°19′08″N 95°38′07″W	Claremore	
7	Will Rogers Hotel	Will Rogers Hotel	December 29, 1994 (#94001508)	524 W. Will Rogers Boulevard; 36°18′45″N 95°36′55″W	Claremore	
8	Will Rogers Memorial Library	Will Rogers Memorial Library	November 3, 2023 (#100009400)	121 North Weenonah Ave. 36°18′41″N 95°36′40″W	Claremore	Now the Claremore Museum of History (MoH)

== Other attractions ==
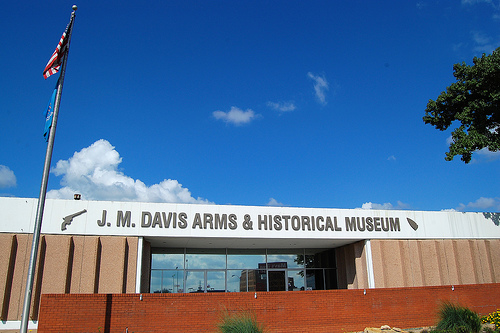
J.M. Davis Arms & Historical Museum

- J. M. Davis Arms and Historical Museum
- Will Rogers Memorial Museum
- Will Rogers Downs
- Oklahoma Military Academy Museum

== Notable people ==
- Levy Adcock, football player
- Brad Carson, former U.S. congressman
- Rotnei Clarke, basketball player
- Carrie Barefoot Dickerson, activist
- Fawn Douglas (Las Vegas Paiute), artist and co-founder of Nuwu Art
- Frankie Hargis (1965–2021), Cherokee Nation registrar (2018–2021), tribal councilor (2011–2018)
- Tito Jackson, singer/musician (The Jackson 5)
- C. Darnell Jones II, retired United State district judge
- Mercedes Lackey, author
- Patti Page, singer and entertainer
- Carl Radle, bassist
- Dave Rader, baseball player
- Lynn Riggs, playwright
- Will Rogers, entertainer, comedian, and actor
- Stuart Roosa, astronaut
- Barbara Starr Scott (1939–2020), Cherokee Nation tribal councilor (1983–1987, 1995–1999)
- Kywin Supernaw, NFL player
- Janees Taylor, Cherokee Nation treasurer (2021–present), tribal councilor (2013–2019)
- Kimberly Teehee, delegate-designate of the Cherokee Nation to the U.S. House of Representatives
- Helen Walton, philanthropist and wife of Walmart founder Sam Walton
- Madison Whitekiller, 2017–18 Miss Cherokee

== Twin towns ==
- (Russia) Muravlenko
