= Ray Everett =

American attorney, entrepreneur and author

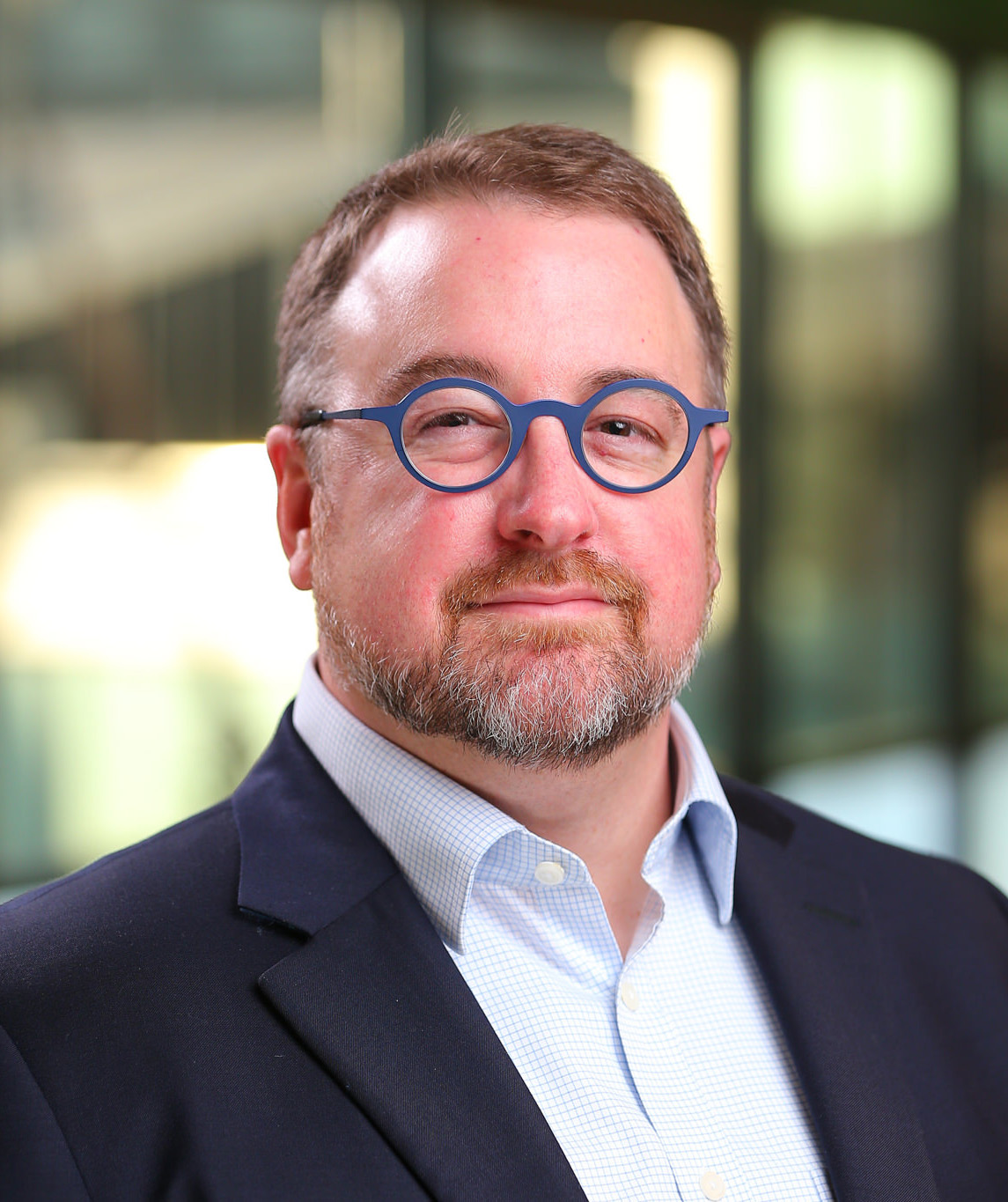
- Ray Everett in 2017
- Born: March 27, 1969 (age 57); St. Petersburg, Florida, United States
- Education: George Washington University Law School; George Mason University
- Occupations: General Counsel, Topcon Healthcare Inc.
- Known for: Creating the modern Chief Privacy Officer position

Ray Everett (born March 27, 1969), formerly known as Ray Everett-Church, is an American attorney, entrepreneur and author. He was dubbed "the dean of corporate Chief Privacy Officers" by Interactive Week Magazine, first creating that title and position in 1999 at Internet advertising company AllAdvantage. In 1997, he was profiled by The New York Times as an influential advocate of responsible online advertising. In 2013 and 2014 Business Insider designated him among the "Most Important LGBT People in Tech."

== Biography ==
Everett combined computers, writing and security at an early age. He purchased his first computer, a Commodore 64, and a 300-baud modem at age 14. A year later, he published his first article, writing for the Westview (a Nashville area community newspaper) and detailing his experiences as a youthful cracker of various early online services and WATS systems.

He worked for the American Immigration Lawyers Association in Washington, D.C., where he first became involved with the issue of spam as a result of the notorious "Green Card Lottery" spams sent by immigration lawyers Canter & Siegel. That involvement was featured in a Wired Magazine article in 1999. He continued to work on the emerging issues of spam and Internet privacy as independent consultant, where his work included developing anti-spam policies and enforcement practices for America Online, and as an Associate at the telecommunications law firm of Haley Bader & Potts PLLC in Ballston, Virginia.

In 1999 he went to work for Internet infomediary AllAdvantage where he, along with AllAdvantage CEO Jim Jorgensen, conceived of the corporate Chief Privacy Officer position and helped define the privacy standards for the world's first implementation of a mass market infomediary. He was also the Vice President for Public Policy at AllAdvantage, where he managed lobbying and government relations, including the first piece of anti-spam legislation ever passed by the United States House of Representatives. In April 2000, Everett orchestrated a visit from then-President Bill Clinton as the keynote speaker at a $1.1 Million fundraising event celebrating AllAdvantage's first anniversary.

From 2001 to 2004, he served as Chief Privacy Officer and Vice President for Consulting for Philadelphia-based ePrivacy Group, a privacy consulting and anti-spam technology firm. While there, he was part of the executive team that built anti-spam technology company TurnTide Inc., which was sold to Symantec Corporation in 2004 for $28 million.

After privacy roles at Habeas, Responsys, Keynote Systems, and Yahoo, in 2014 he became Director of Product Management and Principal Consultant at TrustArc (formerly TRUSTe) where his group designed software for automating privacy risk management and built the company's first consulting practice. In 2019, he was named Chief Privacy Officer for financial technology company Blackhawk Network Holdings (a Silver Lake portfolio company). In 2024 he joined Topcon Healthcare, Inc., where he serves as General Counsel and Chief Data Protection Officer.

While he has spent considerable time working with Internet start-up ventures in Silicon Valley, his consulting clients have included many large global organizations such as Pharmacia, Pfizer, Kimberly-Clark, Intuit, Aventis, Household/HSBC, Microsoft, the National Association of Home Builders, Ericsson, Comcast, Pandora Radio, Kia Motors, ExxonMobil, Fujifilm, Kellogg's, Mattel, Mondelez, Thermo Fisher Scientific, Toyota, and Yum! Brands. In 1997, he was a co-founder of the anti-spam Coalition Against Unsolicited Commercial Email. In 2002, he was a founding board member of the Privacy Officers Association (now called the International Association of Privacy Professionals).

== Publications ==
Everett co-authored Internet Privacy for Dummies (2002) and Fighting Spam for Dummies (2004), both part of the popular "...For Dummies" book series published by John Wiley & Sons. He has also written chapters on privacy and other Internet-related legal issues for The Internet Encyclopedia (2003) and The Handbook of Information Security (2006). He co-authored the Trusted Email Open Standard, a technical framework for increasing security and trust leveraging existing email technologies and protocols. From 2004 to 2009, he was a columnist for eSecurityPlanet.com and Datamation (JupiterMedia) and wrote more than fifty columns on privacy, security, spam.

== Education ==
Everett holds a B.A. in International Studies from George Mason University (where he served as Editor-in-Chief of the student newspaper Broadside) and a Juris Doctor from The George Washington University Law School. While in law school, he studied under Professor Jonathan Turley, where he was on a litigation team challenging Black Bag Operations authorized under the Foreign Intelligence Surveillance Act (FISA) in espionage cases against former CIA agent Harold J. Nicholson and former FBI agent Earl Edwin Pitts.

== Notable activities ==
- Principal at PrivacyClue LLC, a privacy consultancy based in the San Francisco area
- Columnist for JupiterMedia's Datamation.com and eSecurityPlanet.com
- Weekly segment on The David Lawrence Show on satellite radio
- Co-founder and former counsel to the Coalition Against Unsolicited Commercial Email (CAUCE)
- Member of the National Advisory Council for the George Washington University School of Engineering and Applied Science (SEAS)
- Founding Board Member Network Time Foundation
