= Business networking =

Sharing of information or services between people, companies or groups

Speed networking may be used to quickly establish business connections.

Business networking is the practice of building relationships with individuals and businesses for professional purposes. It involves the strategic exchange of information and resources to create connections that can be mutually beneficial. Business networking may involve face-to-face events, online engagement, or a combination of both. Repeated professional interactions can contribute to stronger relationships among participating individuals and organizations. This encourages knowledge exchange, mutual adaptation, and a commitment of resources, which can be both financial and social, to one another.

Business networking involves building relationships that may support career development, facilitate information exchange, and foster professional connections. There are two main approaches to networking: in-person events like conferences and online platforms like LinkedIn. Practitioners of business networking commonly report that preparation and continued engagement after initial meetings can enhance the usefulness of their professional contacts. It is estimated that around half of all jobs in the USA are found via networking.

== Goals ==
Business networking offers a variety of advantages for professionals at all stages of their careers. Some goals individuals can achieve through effective networking include career advancement opportunities, gaining access to valuable knowledge and expertise, and building mutually beneficial relationships.

Networks can be a powerful tool for identifying new job openings, particularly positions that are not advertised. Connections can provide recommendations and introductions to hiring managers. Networking allows individuals to showcase their skills and experience to potential employers. By building relationships with potential clients and partners at networking events, one can significantly increase awareness of their brand or business. A network may serve as a referral source for business opportunities, according to cited studies and sources. These connections can become a source of knowledge and expertise. Through conversations and potential mentorship opportunities with experienced professionals, valuable insights can be gained into industry trends and best practices. Business networking fosters the development of mutually beneficial relationships. By connecting with like-minded professionals, organizations can build long-term, trusted bonds that offer support, advice, and collaboration opportunities.

Many businesses use networking as a key element in their marketing plans. It can help develop trust between participants and increase a company's visibility. Suppliers and businesses can be seen as networked businesses, and will tend to source the business and their suppliers through their existing relationships, as well as with the companies they work closely with. Penny Power states that networked businesses tend to be open, random, and supportive, whereas those relying on hierarchical, traditional managed approaches are closed, selective, and controlling.

== History ==
Historically, there have been multiple forms of business networks, such as those among religious or ethnic groups, among small businesses, or between large companies and their subcontractors. Business networks have existed between firms as well as between individuals. Guilds, associations of merchants and craftspeople, were the main form of business network in North America and Western Europe prior to the Industrial Revolution. Beginning in the 1700s, chambers of commerce began to be founded. In the early twentieth century, service clubs such as the Rotary Club, Lions Club, and Kiwanis Club were founded as social organizations for business networking.

In the second half of the twentieth century, networking was promoted to help business people to build their social capital. Business networking by members of marginalized groups (e.g., women, African Americans, etc.) has been encouraged to identify and address the challenges barring them from professional success. Mainstream business literature subsequently adopted the terms and concepts, and promoted them as pathways to success for all career climbers.

Prior to the emergence of online platforms, in-person networking events and professional organizations were the primary venues for business networking activities. This was achieved through a number of techniques such as trade show marketing and loyalty programs. Though these techniques have been proven to still be an effective source of making connections and growing a business, many companies now focus more on online marketing due to the ability to track every detail of a campaign and justify the expenditure involved in setting up a campaign.

== Types ==
Business networking can be broadly categorized into two main approaches: in-person networking and online networking.

In-person networking allows organizations and entrepreneurs to connect with professionals face-to-face. Industry conferences and trade shows provide opportunities to meet potential clients, partners, and colleagues while also learning about current trends.

Online networking provides another resource to connect with professionals virtually. Platforms like LinkedIn are designed specifically for professional networking, allowing individuals to build their network, share their expertise, and participate in industry discussions. Online forums and communities focused on specific industries can be a valuable resource for connecting with like-minded individuals and asking questions about the industry. Industry-specific discussion boards offer another avenue for online networking, where individuals can showcase their knowledge, learn from others, and potentially find new collaborators or clients.

== Strategies ==
Commentators on professional networking note that defining objectives for interactions before, during, and after events can influence outcomes. By planning a proactive approach, professionals can maximize the value gained from these interactions and connect to a network that promotes career growth and business development. It is beneficial for organizations to establish clear goals for their interactions and to tailor the approach according to each connection one is trying to form. Researching event attendees beforehand, if possible, is beneficial. Identifying individuals whose work aligns with interests or professional goals allows for unique conversation starters. This demonstrates genuine interest in connecting and establishing rapport which can in turn increase an organization's or individual's reputation. Once the initial connection is made, following up after a networking event with a professional email that shows gratitude for the interaction and knowledge gained can continue the conversation and can begin the foundation for a strong business network connection.

== Benefits ==
One of the most significant advantages is the potential for increased career opportunities. A strong network can provide opportunities such as unadvertised job openings through connections who might be aware of potential fits within their companies. These connections can also provide valuable recommendations and introductions to hiring managers or other individuals who are interested in forming business connections. Additionally, networking events and online platforms offer opportunities to show one's skills or an organization's capabilities and knowledge to a wider audience of potential employers, increasing overall visibility in the job market and business community.

Beyond career advancement, business networking builds brand awareness. By building strong relationships with potential clients and partners at networking events and through online interactions, organizations can significantly increase awareness of their brand or business. These connections can then develop into paying customers or business connections that can help expand an organization. A strong network acts as a referral source, bringing in new business opportunities through trusted recommendations from one's network members.

The larger an organization's or individual's network, the greater their access to knowledge and experience. This type of access proves to be valuable when attempting to expand the business into unknown territory or beginning one's business career. Learning from those who have been in a certain industry for a long time can improve chances of recognition from other brands and businesses who would want to form connections and builds reputation for the organization or individual.

== Challenges ==
Some analyses suggest that professional networking may afford job-seekers access to opportunities that would not otherwise be visible within formal job markets. The skilled networker cultivates personal relationships with prospective employers and selection panelists in the hope that these personal affections will influence future hiring decisions. This form of networking has raised ethical concerns. The objection is that it constitutes an attempt to corrupt formal selection processes. The networker is accused of seeking non-meritocratic advantage over other candidates, advantage that is based on personal fondness rather than on any objective appraisal of which candidate is most qualified for the position.

Furthermore, research has shown that underrepresented groups are disadvantaged from building professional connections. Given the value of business networks, this may explain persistent differences in labor markets between underrepresented and majority groups or between genders. Specifically, it is estimated that half of all jobs are found through professional networks. Various descriptive studies show that members of underrepresented groups have less valuable connections and profit less from professional networking. For example, McDonald (2011) shows that people who report predominantly interacting with white men in their professional lives receive more job leads and have higher-status connections. The study is based on a representative survey of US individuals. Further, a 2025 study provides causal evidence in this regard. In the study, the researchers conduct a large-scale field experiment on LinkedIn in which they vary the race of fictitious LinkedIn profiles via AI-generated profile pictures and sent connection requests to LinkedIn users. They find that Black users receive 13% fewer acceptances than their white counterparts, despite having the same CV. In a second stage of the experiment, the fictitious profiles send messages to the established connections. Here, the researchers show no difference in answers and response rates between Black and white profiles. They interpret this as a foot-in-the-door effect, where Black users initially face discrimination which vanishes once a connection is established. A study on academic networks on Twitter shows similar results with respect to follow-back rates and race. The authors further show that follow-back rates for female fake accounts were higher than for male accounts.

While social media offers a powerful platform for business networking, it still has its downsides. Social media interactions can sometimes feel superficial or inauthentic. Building genuine relationships takes time and effort, which can be difficult in the fast-paced online world. It can be difficult to maintain a balance of showcasing one's expertise and oversharing personal or confidential information, and this type of oversharing can cause damage to an organization's reputation. Social media can be overwhelming, since it is filled with a constant stream of content. This can make it difficult for an organization or an individual to stand out and put their name out online. Social media can also be cruel to new content or those who post controversial topics, as these can also damage an organization's reputation.

== See also ==
- Brown Skin Brunchin'
- Guanxi
- Personal network
- Professional network service
