= Information officer =

Information officer is the title of the role defined in South Africa's Protection of Personal Information Act (POPIA) to the person responsible for encouraging responsible persons to comply with the principles and conditions for the lawful processing of personal information and assisting data subjects make requests and lodge complaints. The title information officer is synonymous with that of data protection officer established in the General Data Protection Regulation (GDPR). The data protection officer is not the same as that of chief privacy officer in the United States.

The term information officer is not a standard term in EU and USA as it might be confused with chief information officer role.

An information officer’s responsibilities (similar to those of a data protection officer) include:

1. The encouragement of compliance, by a public or private body, with the principles and conditions for the lawful processing of personal information.
2. Dealing with requests made to the body by a data subject.
3. Working with the relevant regulator or supervisory authority.
