= TheOfficialBoard =

France-based online contact database

- Available in: English, French, Spanish, Japanese, Chinese, Portuguese, German
- Founded: 2009
- Headquarters: France
- Founder: Thomas Lot
- Industry: Internet
- Registration: Yes

The Official Board is a France-based online contact database. The database maintains up-to-date corporate organizational and data charts for all the world's private and public companies exceeding $100 million in revenue, which includes over 50,000 companies. The data is updated by industry experts and members of the site and is verified by each company. It is used to research organizational structures and find contact information for corporate executives.

The Official Board was founded by Amazon and Apple Inc. executive Thomas Lot in 2009. It is based in France.

== Studies and corporate developments ==
On June 12, 2014, The Official Board released an iPhone application.

On August 26, 2014, The Official Board released an 18-month-long survey study on the presence of female executives and board members in the world's largest companies, which concluded that women were least represented in chairman of the board and chief executive officer functions.
