= PlayPlace =

Children's playground attached to a McDonald's restaurant

McDonald's PlayPlace
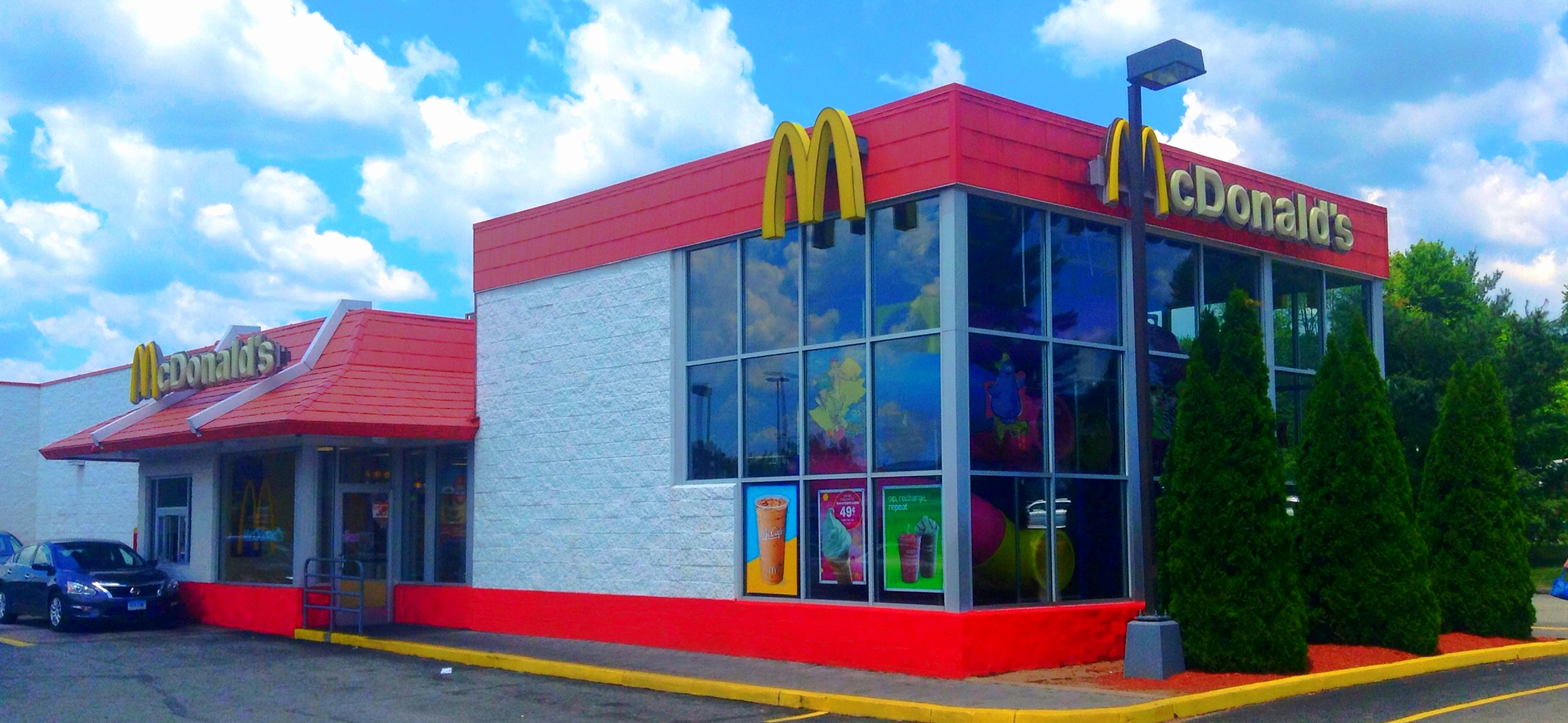
- An indoor PlayPlace at a McDonald's in Bloomfield, Connecticut
- Location: Various McDonald's restaurants
- Status: Operating
- Operated by: McDonald's
- Theme: McDonaldland
- Operating season: Year-round (indoor and outdoor)

A PlayPlace is an amusement commercial playground attached to a McDonald's restaurant. It features play areas such as tube mazes, slides, ball pits, and video games, as well as tables for eating. First established in 1971 at the Chula Vista, California location, it is usually rainbow-colored and themed after McDonaldland.

== History ==
The McDonald's PlayPlace first appeared in California in 1971, and debuted for McDonald's franchises at the 1972 Illinois State Fair.

The world's largest PlayPlace was opened in 1976 in Orlando, Florida. It is part of the World's Largest Entertainment McDonald's, which features family entertainment center-like attractions, including arcade games and pizza.

In 1991, McDonald's created a chain of family entertainment centers based on PlayPlaces called Leaps and Bounds, that eventually merged into Discovery Zone and Chuck E. Cheese.

In 1999, the U.S. Consumer Product Safety Commission fined McDonald's $4 million after failing to report over 400 injuries that children sustained after using the Big Mac Climber jungle gyms.

In March 2020, all PlayPlaces in restaurants located in the United States were temporarily closed due to health concerns related to the COVID-19 pandemic. But most reopened in 2023.

In the 2020s, PlayPlaces have appeared less frequently in new and renovated restaurants, reportedly due to factors such as health and safety concerns, decreased usage, families eating out less, a shift in marketing from kids and families to young adults, and McDonald's wanting to present a more "sleek and modern" image of the chain.
