= AllAdvantage =

Online advertising company

- Type: Private (defunct)
- Industry: Online advertising · Internet marketing
- Founded: March 31, 1999
- Founders: Jim Jorgensen; Johannes Pohle; Carl Anderson; Oliver Brock
- Defunct: February 2001
- Fate: Ceased operations
- Area served: Worldwide
- Products: “Get Paid to Surf” ad-sharing service; Viewbar software
- Website: (defunct)

AllAdvantage was an Internet advertising company that positioned itself as the world’s first "infomediary" by paying its users/members a portion of the advertising revenue generated by their online viewing habits. It became most well known for its slogan "Get Paid to Surf the Web," a phrase that has since become synonymous with a wide array of online ad revenue sharing systems (see, e.g., paid to surf).

== History ==
AllAdvantage was launched on March 31, 1999, by Jim Jorgensen, Johannes Pohle, Carl Anderson, and Oliver Brock. During its nearly 2 years of operation, it raised nearly $200 Million in venture capital and grew to more than 10 million members in its first 18 months of operation. The company's practice of compensating existing members for referring new members led it to become one of the most heavily promoted websites of its time. In 1999, the company had over 4 million members worldwide, in over 240 countries, having delivered more than 4 billion ads in the month of November of that year. That popularity was reflected in the ranking of AllAdvantage.com among the top 20 of many website traffic indices during most of the company's existence, including Nielsen/NetRatings. That method of promotion also led the company to be heavily criticized for its early inability to prevent its members from spamming for referrals in order to collect additional income. It eventually overcame many of those problems and company executives were deeply involved in anti-spam legislative proposals, including the first anti-spam bill to pass the US House of Representatives.

AllAdvantage ultimately fell victim to the sharp decline in advertising spending as the dot-com bubble burst and the U.S. economy entered a recessionary period in mid-2000. AllAdvantage planned an initial public offering of stock in early 2000, underwritten by investment banker Frank Quattrone of the firm Credit Suisse First Boston. As the IPO market continued to sour through mid-2000, the offering plans were cancelled. The company continued to seek new sources of revenue and expanded its offerings to include sweepstakes. The company finally halted consumer-facing operations in February 2001. By the time it closed its doors, the company had paid out over $160 million to its members.

== Industry contributions ==
AllAdvantage contributed several enduring concepts to the online marketplace. For example, AllAdvantage was one of the first implementations of the infomediary concept to reach a mass market. The concept of the infomediary was first suggested by McKinsey consultants and professors John Hagel, III, and Marc Singer in their book NetWorth. (Hagel and Singer eventually became informal advisers to the company.)

The company's Viewbar software was one of the earliest desktop user tracking and ad targeting technologies. The Viewbar displayed advertisements in a narrow application window that could be docked to the top or bottom of the user's screen, targeting those advertisements to the content being viewed by the user as they browsed websites. The same technologies, minus the permission of users or monetary compensation, became the basis of the adware and spyware industries.

The company also appointed the world's first corporate Chief Privacy Officer, creating the role as a senior level executive responsible for protecting the privacy and security of user data and managing a variety of risks and threats to the integrity of the service. The company appointed privacy lawyer Ray Everett-Church to the newly created position in August 1999, sparking a trend that quickly spread among major corporations, both offline and online. By 2001, the non-profit research organization Privacy and American Business reported that a significant number of Fortune 500 firms had appointed senior executives with the title or role of Chief Privacy Officer. By 2008, the International Association of Privacy Professionals boasted that it had more than 5000 privacy officers or other privacy executives as members.

AllAdvantage is perhaps most remembered for its successful adaptation of the "viral marketing" concept, a term first coined by the venture capital firm Draper Fisher Jurvetson. In viral marketing, members of the service promote it to their friends and acquaintances, which AllAdvantage enhanced by adding a compensation component, rewarding users for the number of members they successfully referred. In a May 2000 article for Red Herring magazine, Steve Jurvetson cited AllAdvantage as a prime example of viral marketing success.

In a recent article, a former AllAdvantage executive also noted that, although the company didn't survive, the behavioral marketing approach pioneered by the company remains an important component of many businesses in the online marketing and advertising space.

== User abuse ==
Many early AllAdvantage users attempted to utilize spamming techniques to artificially build up their referral numbers. In the first months following the company's launch, email service providers and anti-spam services identified emails referencing AllAdvantage as spam, resulting in widespread blocking. Shortly after hiring anti-spam expert Ray Everett as the company's Chief Privacy Officer, the company implemented significant changes in its affiliate promotion and referral policies, including a system to enable quicker reporting and termination of spamming accounts. By 2000, the reported volumes of AllAdvantage-related spam had reduced significantly.

AllAdvantage was also the target of other fraudulent activities, such as attempts to simulate surfing in order to accrue credit. These techniques were based upon the manner in which the AllAdvantage "Viewbar" tracked the time that users actively spent browsing the web, through the detection of which applications were "in focus" as well as keyboard and mouse movements. In an attempt to defraud the company, several client-side applications were created that attempted to simulate surfing-related interactivity, including "MyAdvantage" and "AllMouse."

Initially, such applications were successful at simulating a user's 20 hours of surfing, however those applications were limited in their negative impact on the company for several reasons: their usage was limited to relatively few "hacker hobbyists"; fraudulent users received no direct compensation beyond the established minimum surfing time while the company received advertising revenues based on average surfing times of the entire user base. The AllAdvantage software was frequently updated with detection algorithms derived from analysis of many of the simulators and was able to flag "suspect" surfing accounts for withholding of any payments while giving users the appearance of still accumulating their fraudulent hours.

== Spin-off companies ==
On 20 November 2006, it was reported that several AllAdvantage founders were reincarnating the business as a new (now defunct) company, AGLOCO (which stands for "A Global Community").
