= Rappa =

Rappa is a surname of Italian origin. Notable people with the surname include:

- Elfin Pertiwi Rappa (born 1995), Indonesian beauty pageant titleholder
- Michael Rappa, American analytics professor

== Fictional ==
- PaRappa Rappa, Sony video game character from 1996.
