= Worky =

- Website type: Professional network service
- Employees: 10
- Website: www.worky.com
- Commercial: Yes
- Registration: Required
- Launched: 2009; Dublin, Ireland
- Current status: Active

Worky is a global online professional network with members in 136 countries. Launched in 2009, the company initially focused on matching jobs to the skills of its members to simplify the online recruitment process. The company repositioned in 2010 and now purportedly offers a platform for both individuals and companies to promote themselves online and also facilitates online recruitment. The site currently features jobs in 22 countries worldwide through its advertisers and through 3rd party providers. The domain name was purchased from someone in the US with the same name. Worky.com is a privately held Irish owned business operated by Worky Ltd. The company currently employs 10 people and is headquartered in Clanwilliam Square, Dublin, Ireland.

== Ray Nolan ==
The founder of Worky is Ray Nolan, who ranks among Ireland's most successful entrepreneurs, previously having founded Web Reservations International which sold to Hellman & Friedman in 2009 for $458m. With Worky, Nolan's intention was to "challenge the traditional job-seeking site" The setting up of Worky.com is entirely self-funded.
