= Shapr =

Professional networking app

- Developers: Ludovic Huraux, Jonathan Rogez, Cyril Ferey, Vincent Bobin and Thomas Bouttefort
- Operating system: Various
- Type: Social networking service

Shapr was a professional networking app, which used an algorithm to suggest professionals with matching interests and similar professional goals. Shapr is headquartered in Paris, France.

Shapr was started in 2015 by Ludovic Huraux, Jonathan Rogez, Cyril Ferey, Vincent Bobin and Thomas Bouttefort. The app's initial launch was funded through a 2015 seed round of $3 million. The team announced an additional raise of $4 million in 2016. In June 2017, Shapr announced a Series A raise of $9.5 million.

== Work ==
Shapr uses LinkedIn to build a user profile with basic data including the user's photo and job title. Users then add up to ten interests. From there, Shapr's smart algorithm curates a daily batch of 10-20 profiles of relevant and active users nearby who share similar interests and goals. When users share interests, these are displayed in orange while viewing a user's profile. Users can swipe right or click "Meet" on profiles when they hope to connect. Users can then pick a ready-to-go conversation starter to say hello and set up a time to continue the conversation offline.

== Reception ==
The Economist's 1843 Magazine called the app "the Shapr of things to come" and says the app is built around the idea that "networks are more effective when built around a handful of worthwhile relationships, not thousands of interactions". The Wall Street Journal says the app "could dispel the fear of rejection that discourages some users from reaching out on LinkedIn." Inc. magazine shared "what is different about Shapr is that it's repositioning networking as a mindset and an essential professional skill to master, rather than a means to an end."

Wired points out that in order for the app to succeed, people need to believe that "connecting with people outside of your normal interest groups is the key to professional success."

== Discontinued ==
The service closed down in 2023, after being acquired by the Lincoln Group.
