= Leaps and Bounds =

Leaps and Bounds may refer to:

- Leaps and Bounds (album), an album by Singers & Players
- Leaps and Bounds (playplace), a chain of indoor play-places
- "Leaps and Bounds" (song), a 1987 song by Paul Kelly and the Coloured Girls
