= Wes Cook =

American artist and Disney imagineer

Floyd Wesley "Wes" Cook (ca. 1931 – ca. 2004) was an American conceptual and commercial artist and Disney Imagineer.

== Career ==
He was known for contributing designs for theme parks including Tokyo DisneySea, Universal Islands of Adventure, SeaWorld, and McDonaldland. He was a designer for The Banana Splits and H.R. Pufnstuf. He spent a portion of his career working for Setmakers, the company that designed the first McDonald's PlayPlaces. He also painted a pastoral mural featuring McDonald's characters which inspired Panic Inc. co-founder Cabel Sasser to create a collection of Cook's artwork and drawings in Portland.
