= Jim Jorgensen =

American serial entrepreneur

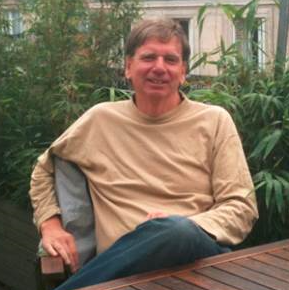
Jim Jorgensen

Jim Jorgensen (born 1948 in Racine, Wisconsin) is a serial entrepreneur. He has started over 25 enterprises since getting his MBA at Stanford Graduate School of Business at the age of 24. Jorgensen's industry selection for these new enterprises has been wide, running from retail to manufacturing, from Internet to mail order, and from oil exploration to insurance. Some of the entities remained small, while two of them reached market caps in excess of $1 billion.

== Entrepreneurial history ==
=== 1970s and 1980s ===
Jorgensen earned his CPA certificate while working at KPMG before and during his time as a graduate student. (Hoffman 2006) His first start in entrepreneurialism was to form the first New Enterprise Club at Stanford with classmate Rene "Ron" Sutton (the club later became the Stanford Entrepreneur Club).

During his second year of graduate school, Jorgensen met Billie Jean King and her husband Larry. (Hoffman 2006) Jorgensen's sports entrepreneurship started while still attending school. One of his first projects was to help negotiate the Battle of the Sexes (the tennis extravaganza between Billie Jean King and Bobby Riggs) with sports and entertainment mogul Jerry Perenchio. The event became the most watched tennis event in history. Also at this time he helped in the formation of a new professional sports league, World Team Tennis (Hoffman 2006)

Over the next five years, Jorgensen formed several new ventures with Billie Jean and Larry King, including:

Future Inc – a sports agency (Jorgensen was a co-founder and the CEO). An early entry in female sports representation, Future Inc.’s clients included; Billie Jean, Chris Evert, Rosie Casals and golfers Sandra Palmer and Jane Blalock. It was eventually sold to Mark McCormack’s IMG (Hoffman 2006)

King Enterprises – an international sports company. (Jorgensen was a co-founder and the CEO). Within three years, company created numerous tennis tournaments on and off the Women's Tennis Association tour and around the world. By 1976, the company was the world's largest promoter of professional tennis events, with the most events and the most attendance. Tournament cities included; London, San Francisco, Tokyo, Los Angeles, Osaka, Monterrey, Atlanta, Stuttgart, and Tampa. In 1976, as promoter of the Atlanta WTA tournament, Jorgensen made the decision to invite transsexual Renée Richards to her first WTA event where she beat Rosie Casals in the opening round. (Hoffman 2006)

Inspired by Billie Jean's friendship with Elton John, the company tried music concerts with Ray Charles and Sergio Mendes and Brasil '66. (hoffman 2006) The company also created the event and television series, Women's Superstars with ABC and IMG.

Soviet Union National Team – an entry in World Team Tennis in 1977. (Jorgensen was a co-founder and the President). The team played 44 matches in 33 cities in 65 days. Its stars were Olga Morozova and Alex Metreveli – The other owners of the team were Los Angeles Lakers owner Jerry Buss and commodity trader and New York Sets owner Sol Berg. The team's most colorful event was held in Plains, Georgia and was hosted by Lillian Carter and Billy Carter, the mother and brother of then President Jimmy Carter. It was held on a tennis court the team built for the occasion near Miss Lillian's home and subsequently donated to the city of Plains. (Hoffman 1977)

Women's Sports Foundation – a foundation to foster the involvement of girls and women in sports participation. (Jorgensen was a co-founder and President) Jorgensen served as a Trustee for 15 years. He recruited Eva Auchincloss as executive director, and the board of trustees was expanded to include influential persons like Donna de Varona, Peggy Fleming, Peanuts creator Charles M. Schulz. Currently, the Women's Sports Foundation is one of the most influential organizations in women's sports.

WomenSports magazine – the first magazine dedicated to women in sports. (Jorgensen was a co-founder and the President).The magazine was launched as a 16-page insert in Glamour magazine with Billie Jean King on the cover. The magazine was started in 1974 and sold to Redbook’s publisher in 1976, having reached a monthly circulation of 200,000. During that brief two-year period, the magazine got help from Ms. Magazine publisher Gloria Steinem and singer Helen Reddy. Notable employees included editor Rosalie Wright (became the editor of Sunset), writer Anne Lamott (now a serial book author) and intern Sally Ride (who became America's first female astronaut). (Hoffman 2006)

Women's Professional Softball League – the first professional softball league. (Jorgensen was a co-founder with Joan Joyce, Dennis Murphy (WHL and WTT) and Billie Jean King). The league struggled for four years before folding.

In 1978, Jorgensen moved to Los Angeles to head up a television production company and shortly thereafter went back to starting companies. Some of these were:

Jorgensen & Company – a celebrity business management company. (Jorgensen was the founder and senior partner) – Clients included; actors, Sharon Stone, Teri Hatcher, Lily Tomlin, Sharon Gless, Judge Reinhold, Shawn Weatherly (Miss Universe and Baywatch) and Tracy Scoggins – writers Douglas Adams (Hitchhiker's Guide to the Universe) John Hughes (Home Alone, Planes, Trains and Automobiles, Ferris Bueller's Day Off, The Breakfast Club), Ronald Shusett (Alien, Total Recall), Dan O’Bannon, Diane English (Murphy Brown) and Jane Wagner (The Search for Signs of Intelligent Life in the Universe), – directors Tobe Hooper (Poltergeist), William Dear (Harry and the Hendersons), and Gary Sherman (Vice Squad), – celebrity PR executive Pat Kingsley and Senator Alan Cranston. (Hoffman 2006)

Western Equity – a real estate development and investment company (Jorgensen was a co- founder and general partner with Dr. David Schoenstadt). (Hoffman 2006) The company developed several historic rehabilitations in Chicago and Kansas City as well as developing commercial and warehouse facilities in the Midwest.

Ronnie's Ranch – a restaurant in Los Angeles. (Jorgensen was a co-founder with Ronnie Burns, son of George Burns and Gracie Allen, and film editor Robert Estrin. It was last of three different restaurants Jorgensen tried over the years, all of which failed.)

All American Indoor Sports – a chain of indoor sports malls. (Jorgensen was a so-founder with Ron Matsch and Dr, David Schoenstadt.) The company built indoor sports malls in the Midwest. The malls featured sports like; soccer, basketball, baseball, gymnastics, dance, and hockey with restaurants and stores to service participants and fans.

Bedrock Capital Management – a registered investment advisor and asset allocation fund. (Jorgensen was a co-founder with Stanford classmate, Jerry Tomanek). (Hoffman 2006) The company has grown to more than $300 million under management. Bedrock Capital was acquired by United Capital Financial Advisors in January 2015.

Preferred Physicians Mutual Risk Retention Group – a medical malpractice insurance company. Jorgensen was a co-founder with Dr. David Schoenstadt. (Hoffman 2006) The company specializes in malpractice insurance solely for anesthesiologists.

=== 1990s and 2000s ===
Discovery Zone – an indoor active play center for children. (Jorgensen was a co-founder and the CEO.) The company grew from one store opened in January 1990 to almost 500 stores within 5 years. In 1993, Discovery Zone completed an IPO with a NASDAQ listed stock. The market value of the company rose quickly to $1.2 billion. In 1995, under control of Wayne Huizenga and Don Flynn who also controlled Blockbuster Video, the company's operations were merged with Blockbuster's parent company Viacom. (Hoffman 2006)

Challenger Sports – a sports training company. (Jorgensen was a co-founder with Ron Matsch). (Hoffman 2006) Headquartered in Lenexa, Kansas, the company is a leading soccer training company.

AllAdvantage – an Internet infomediary community (Jorgensen was a co-founder and the CEO with co-founders Carl Anderson, Johannes Pohle and Oliver Brock). The company had a meteoric rise and fall within a two-year period. Launched on March 30, 1999, within 12 months the company had:

- 13 million members
- raised $175,000,000 in venture capital
- earned over $30 million in advertising sales
- distributed over $100 million in cash distributions to its members
- hired 850 employees, established 35 worldwide offices on four continents
- established the world's first Chief Privacy Officer
- filed an S-1 in February 2000 led by Frank Quattrone of Credit Suisse First Boston at a valuation of $1.4 billion

On April 2, 2000, AllAdvantage held a first anniversary event at Jorgensen's Stanford campus home. The Democratic Party celebrated the company's anniversary with a fund raising dinner on Jorgensen's tented tennis court. The keynote speaker was President Bill Clinton and music provided by Grateful Dead members Mickey Hart and Bob Weir. (Hoffman 2006) Political attendees included Minority Leader Richard Gephardt, Representatives Patrick Kennedy, Zoe Lofgren, Bob Menendez, Ellen Tauscher, Nancy Pelosi, Charlie Rangel, Anna Eshoo, Martin Frost, Barbara Lee, Tom Lantos, Cal Dooley, David Wu, Mike Honda and California Governor Gray Davis. Other attendees included: the President's daughter, Chelsea Clinton; venture capitalist John Doerr of Kleiner Perkins; financier Frank Quattrone; winemaker Ernest Gallo; Oracle founder Larry Ellison; Intuit CEO Steve Bennett; Eric Schmidt (Chairman of Google); pioneering Chief Privacy Officer Ray Everett; VP and General Counsel, David Johnson; HR VP Jan Daniel; eBay CFO Gary Bengier, Microsoft Chief Strategist Craig Mundie, Dr. Dean Ornish, PayPal founder Elon Musk, and Overstock.com founder and CEO Patrick Byrne. This event marked the high point of AllAdvantage. The NASDAQ continued its slide from its peak three weeks earlier, causing the company's IPO to stop. The company eventually closed its consumer service in January 2001. (Hoffman 2006)

Morgen Group – a management consulting firm that specializes in advising startups and new projects for larger corporations. (Jorgensen was a co-founder with Johannes Pohle).

Discover Walks – a travel company headquartered in Paris (Jorgensen was a co-founder with Alex Gourevitch, Bertrand d’Aleman, and Thomas Ferre). The company runs tour operations in Paris, San Francisco, Rome, London, Barcelona, Madrid, Prague, Lisbon and St. Petersburg, Russia.

TrueArtists – largest international organization of certified tattoo artists (Jorgensen was a co-founder with Danny Jorgensen, Rob Wagner, and James Wachira). The company runs the annual Tattoo Awards and certifies tattoo artists for quality workmanship around the world.

RebelsMarket – largest internet marketplace for counterculture fashion and merchandise (Jorgensen was a co-founder with James Wachira and Rob Wagner). Company's internet following is led by its 1,300,000 Facebook page

FashionSprout – an online marketplace for trendy and affordable fashion. The platform focuses on styles and merchandise made in the USA. FashionSprout has aa following of over 2,000,000 on Facebook.

bUnited – in stealth pre-launch, it was billed as The Consumer Revolution (Jorgensen was a co-founder with Johannes Pohle and Ozan Taner).

Books – under the author name of Jay Knight, Jorgensen has written two books; Nothing Ventured published in 2007 and The Happy Class published in 2014.

BeamZ - This project connects travelers with virtual travel experiences, enabling them to explore the world from their homes. The platform has grown into a space shaped by its users. Jorgensen was a co-founder with Alexandre Gourevitch and Chaitanya Malla.

== Sources ==
- Stanford Graduate School of Business
- "Battle of the Sexes - 30 years on"
- Women's Professional Softball League
- money
- SEC
- President Bill Clinton

== Sources ==
- Greg Hoffman, The Art of World Team Tennis, San Francisco Book Company, 1977 ISBN 0-913374-65-2
- Greg Hoffman, The Two Million Dollar Cough, The AllAdvantage Story, Kendall/Carson Press 2006 ISBN 978-0-9792235-0-1
- Kim Chapin, Billie Jean, Harper, 1974
- AllAdvantage.com : an Internet infomediary
