= EPrivacy =

ePrivacy may refer to:

- ePrivacy Directive, EU privacy directive from 2002
- ePrivacy Regulation, EU privacy regulation
- ePrivacy Group, anti-spam company

== See also ==
- Internet privacy
