= Renee Macklin =

U.S. government official

Renee Macklin is the Director of IT Shared Services for the Department of Commerce in the United States of America. Macklin has previously served as CIO of the Small Business Administration, and had a long tenure as CIO of the International Trade Administration.

== Education ==
Macklin is a graduate of Rochester Institute of Technology in Computer Systems, B.S. and American University in Information Systems, M.S.

== Career ==
Earlier in her career she managed multiple ICT organisations and data operation centers that delivered telecommunication services to Fortune 500 businesses around the world. For twelve years she was the chief information officer for the International Trade Administration within the Department of Commerce. In 2013 she accepted the position as the chief information officer and chief privacy officer for Small Business Administration (SBA). For the Department of Commerce (DOC) is Macklin the director of information technology enterprise services.

== Awards ==
Renee Macklin has been selected as part of the list of D.C.’s Top 50 Women in Technology for 2016.
