= Dare Not Walk Alone =

- Film poster
- Directed by: Jeremy Dean
- Written by: Jeremy Dean
- Produced by: Stephen T. Cobb; Jeremy Dean; Richard Mergener
- Cinematography: Russell Brownley; Adrian Phillips
- Music by: Jeremy Griffith
- Distributed by: Indican Pictures
- Release date: September 15, 2006
- Running time: 80 minutes
- Country: United States
- Language: English

Dare Not Walk Alone is a 2006 documentary film directed by Jeremy Dean. The film played the festival circuit in 2006 and in 2007 received the audience award at the Deep Focus Film Festival in Columbus, Ohio. It was signed by Indican Pictures for theatrical, DVD, and TV release. The film was released on DVD on November 11, 2008. In January 2009 the film was nominated for an NAACP Image Award for Outstanding Documentary.

== Overview ==
Dare Not Walk Alone is about the civil rights movement and its aftermath in St. Augustine, Florida, the site of prolonged interracial tension and protests by the NAACP and the SCLC. The most notable protests, including the Monson Motor Lodge swimming pool integration immediately preceded, and arguably precipitated, the signing of the 1964 Civil Rights Act.

== Background ==
Dare Not Walk Alone was conceived in 2003 by artist Jeremy Dean, who was then living and working in the Florida tourist town of St. Augustine, "America's oldest city."

When Dean volunteered to help restore the stained glass windows in an historically black church he learned of the events of 1964, the protests, the beatings, and the brilliant campaign of civil disobedience that led to the passage of the first civil rights act.

While Dean felt honored working to preserve a place where Dr. King had once stood side-by-side with Jackie Robinson to rally supporters, he was stunned that he had never heard of these events before, so he set about researching them. He uncovered archive footage that had never been aired. He sat down with the people who were there, who put their lives on the line in the fight for equality and freedom from segregation.

Waiting tables to finance the project, Dean created the first cut of the film in 2005 and in 2006 the first public screening of Dare Not Walk Alone took place at the historically black Ritz Theatre (Jacksonville), Florida in an event attended by Florida State Senator Tony Hill. Within days, Senator Hill had organized a summit of civic leaders to address housing conditions in St. Augustine's African American community. He later introduced legislation to expunge the criminal records of all persons arrested for peacefully protesting segregation in Florida.

== Release and reviews ==
By the end of 2007 the film had been signed for non-theatrical release by THINKFilm and in April 2008 the film began its theatrical release in Los Angeles with Hollywood-based distributor, Indican Pictures.

When Dare Not Walk Alone made its theatrical debut in Los Angeles, Sara Schieron of Boxoffice Magazine declared it "has the potential to do real good in the world" and Eric Monder of Film Journal International noted, "The racial politics of the current presidential election make this film all the more significant."

Dare Not Walk Alone has been screened at universities such as Notre Dame and a number of historically black colleges and universities. The film was released on DVD in October 2008.

== Awards ==
In 2007, Dare Not Walk Alone won the Audience Award at the Deep Focus Film Festival in Columbus, Ohio. In January 2009 the film was nominated for an NAACP Image Award for Outstanding Documentary and named one of the year's 10 best documentaries.

== See also ==
- Civil rights movement in popular culture
