= Speed dating =

Matchmaking event where people meet potential partners for a short period of time

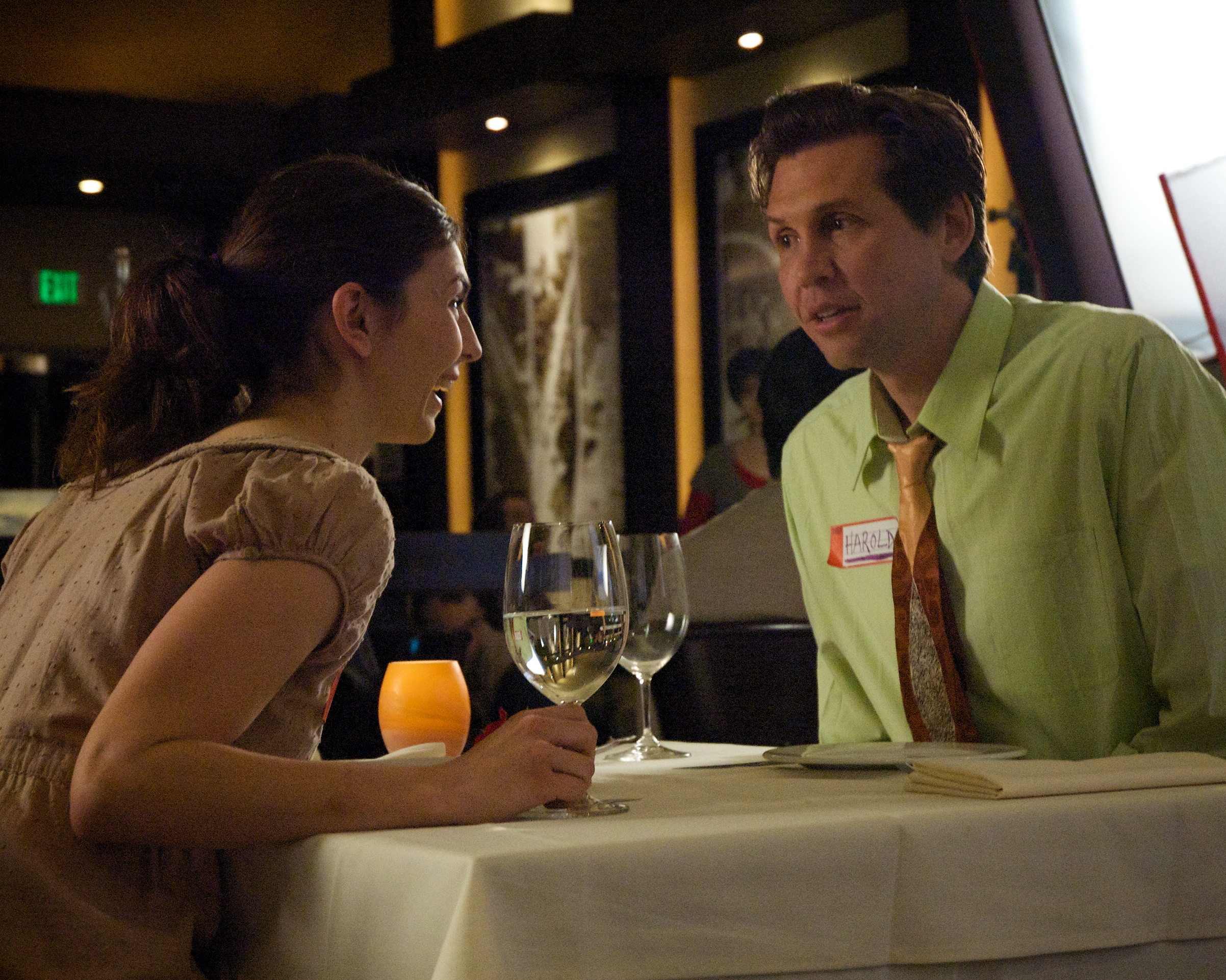
Two people paired up on a speed date, each wearing a name tag

Speed dating is a formalized matchmaking process with the purpose of encouraging eligible singles to meet new potential partners in a very short period of time, so that interested pairs can continue meeting each other after the event.

== Organization ==
Usually, advance registration is required for speed dating events. Participants are rotated to meet each other over a series of short "dates" typically lasting from three to eight minutes depending on the organization running the event. At the end of each interval a signal (e.g., a ringing bell, glass clinks or a whistle blow) is given to alert participants to move on to the next date. When the event concludes, participants can submit a list to the organizers of candidates they would like to share their contact information with. The organizers will forward the contact information if both participants included each other on the list. Contact information cannot be exchanged during the initial meeting to reduce pressure when accepting or rejecting a suitor face-to-face.

There are many speed dating events now in the United Kingdom, Canada, and the United States. Requirement for each event vary with the organizer. Specific age range based on gender is a common restriction for events. Many speed dating events are targeted at particular communities. The documentary film, "Age of Love" describes a speed dating event organized for older adults. Other groups have included: LGBT people, polyamorists, skiers, Jews, and Christians.

== Practice ==
Participants are given a time limit in which they can talk to a potential partner, then are asked if they liked the partner before moving on to the next one. They can come alone without feeling out of place; alternatively it is something that women who like to go out in groups can do together.

According to The New York Times, participants in speed dating receive an average of 2–3 out of 10 matches. Online dating participants are said to find a compatible match with 1 in 100 or fewer of the profiles they study. The BBC reports, in the "Science of Love", that it takes between 90 seconds to 4 minutes of face-to-face interaction to determine attraction, which may give speed dating an advantage over online dating.

== History ==
In the 19th century, there was a custom in some areas of the United States called New Year's Calling. On New Year's Day, January 1, many young, single women would hold an "open house" (a party or reception during which a person's home is open to visitors) where they would invite eligible bachelors, both friends and strangers, to stop by for a brief (no more than 10–15-minute) visit.

The earliest documented example of speed dating was by Aryeh (Alan) and Rena Hirsch of Los Angeles in early 1996, who developed speed dating as a solution to the problem of typical single events where "only attractive women and outgoing men have success at the end of the evening".

"SpeedDating", as a single word, is a registered trademark of Aish HaTorah, who began hosting such events in 1998.

During the COVID-19 pandemic, speed dating and all other dating events were paused out of caution of contracting the disease. However in 2023, speed dating and other in-person meetup mixers have increased from before the pandemic. In 2024, in-person singles events continued to grow by 41% year over year driven by dating app fatigue.

== Scientific research ==
There have been several studies of the round-robin dating systems themselves, as well as studies of interpersonal attraction that are relevant to these events. Other studies found speed-dating data useful as a way to observe individual choices among random participants.

=== First impressions ===
A 2005 study at the University of Pennsylvania of multiple HurryDate speed dating events found that most people made their choices within the first three seconds of meeting. Furthermore, issues such as religion, previous marriages, and smoking habits were found to play much less of a role than expected.

A 2006 study in Edinburgh, Scotland showed that 45% of the women participants in a speed-dating event and 22% of the men had come to a decision within the first 30 seconds. It also found that dialogue concerning travel resulted in more matches than dialogue about films.

In a 2012 study, researchers found that activation of specific brain regions while viewing images of opposite-sex speed dating participants was predictive of whether or not a participant would later pursue or reject the viewed participants at an actual speed dating event. Men and women made decisions in a similar manner which incorporated the physical attractiveness and likability of the viewed participants in their evaluation.

=== Subconscious preferences ===
Canadian writer Malcolm Gladwell's book on split-second decision making, Blink, introduces two professors at Columbia University who run speed-dating events. Drs. Sheena Iyengar and Raymond Fisman found, from having the participants fill out questionnaires, that what people said they wanted in an ideal mate did not match their subconscious preferences.

=== Olfaction and the MHC ===
A 1995 study at the University of Bern showed that women appear to be attracted to the smell of men who have different MHC profiles from their own, and that oral contraceptives reversed this effect.

The MHC is a region of the human genome involved with immune function. Because parents with more diverse MHC profiles would be expected to produce offspring with stronger immune systems, dissimilar MHC may play a role in sexual selection.

A speed date lasting several minutes may be long enough for the MHC hypothesis to come into play, provided the participants are seated close enough together.

=== Olfaction and pheromones ===
The TV news magazine 20/20 once sent both a male and a female set of twins to a speed dating event. One of each set was wearing pheromones, and the ones wearing pheromones received more matches.

=== Age and height preference ===
A 2006 study by Michèle Belot and Marco Francesconi into the relative effects of preference versus opportunity in mate selection showed that a woman's age is the single most important factor determining demand by men. Although less important than it is to men, age is still a highly significant factor determining demand by women.

The same study found that a man's height had a significant impact upon his desirability, with a reduction in height causing a decrease in desirability at the rate of 5% per inch.

=== Selectivity and the rotating gender ===
Studies of speed dating events generally show more selectivity among women than among men. For instance, the Penn study reported that the average man was chosen by 34% of the women and the average woman was chosen by 49% of the men. In a later study, a similar result was obtained when women were seated and men rotated, but when men were seated and women rotated, both received almost equally many acceptances: women were less and men more selective than before.

Biologists and evolutionary psychologists know that women avoid risks and are more selective to avoid being pregnant to a wrong man. Academic study shows that one date is often enough for men.

Women prefer tall men. Men prefer slim women. Education and profession matter for both. However, people lower their criteria if the supply is of low quality.

== Spin-offs ==
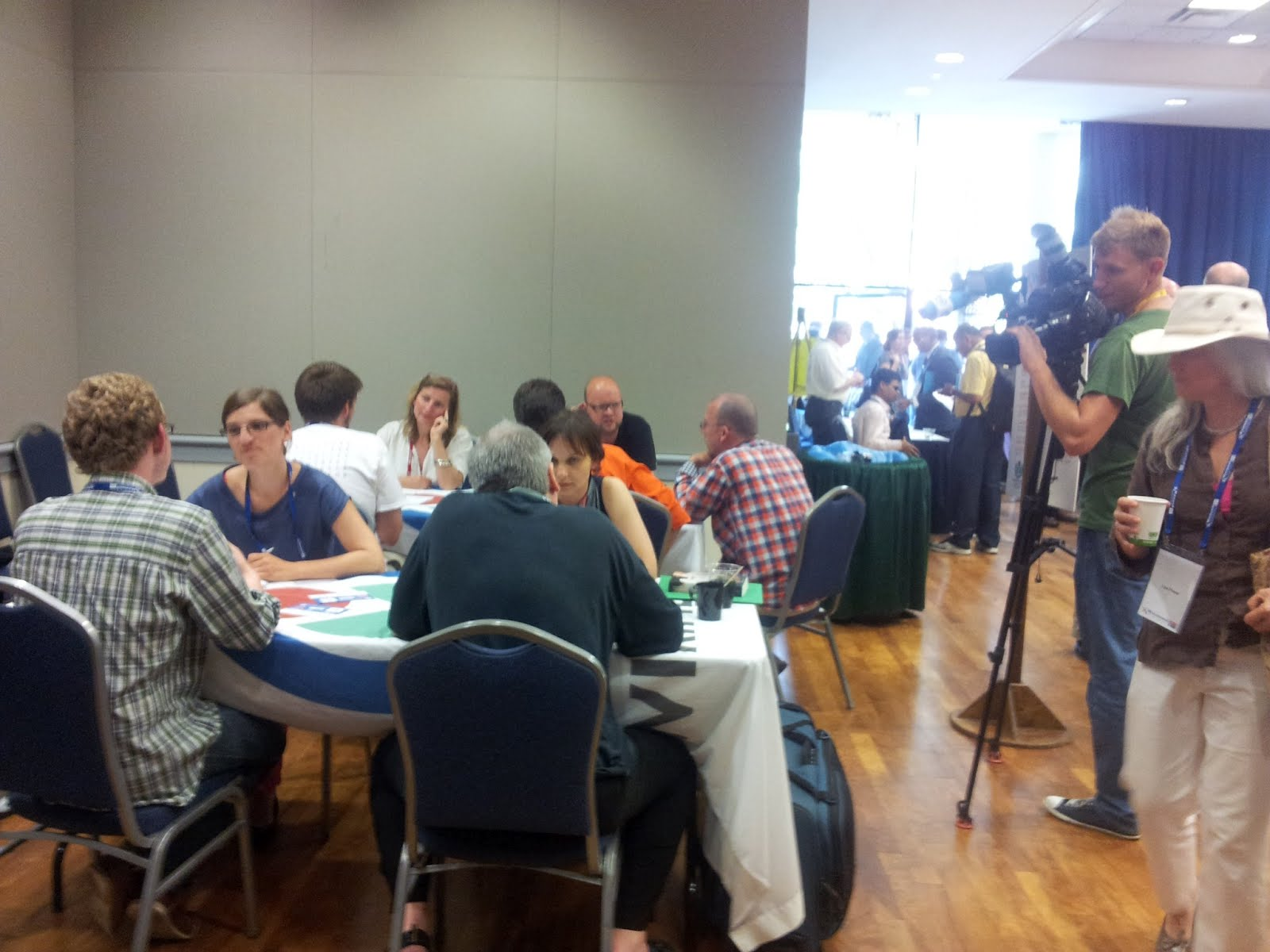
Wikimedia Deutschland "speed dating" at Wikimania 2012, experts pairing up to discuss their specialist fields

The popularity or charm of speed dating has led to at least one spin-off: speed networking. A structured way of running business networking events with the goal of making meeting potential business contacts easier and more productive.

Speed networking has also been used in China as a way for business people to meet each other and to decide if they have similar business objectives and synergies. It offers participating investors and companies an opportunity to have focused private meetings with targeted groups in a compact time frame.

== In popular culture ==
- Frasier. "Sliding Frasiers" (2000): Frasier attends a speed date, describing it as "all the stress and humiliation of a blind date, times twelve."
- Peep Show. "Jeremy's Broke" (2008): Mark goes speed dating but has little luck: "Ohhh, Saz, she implied she might be ticking. Maybe she did tick! Maybe the data wasn't collated correctly! Maybe she's my hanging chad!"
- Sex and the City. "Don't Ask, Don't Tell" (2000): Miranda, the lawyer, pretends to be a stewardess at the event after telling her first few "dates" that she is a successful lawyer scares them off.
- Providence. "The Mating Dance" (2001): Syd goes to a "speed dating" event.
- Kath & Kim. "Gay" (2002): Kim, estranged from her husband of 2 months, goes with her friend Sharon to a speed dating event.
- Reba. "Switch" (2002) : Reba's daughter, Cheyenne, convinces her mother to try speed-dating.
- Monk. "Mr. Monk Goes to the Theater" (2003): Adrian Monk tries to talk to a suspect at a speed dating event.
- Dead Like Me. "Hurry" (2004): Daisy goes speed dating to take the soul of one of the men participating.
- Gilmore Girls. "But Not as Cute as Pushkin" (2004): Featured Rory's friend Paris attempting speed dating after the death of her professor boyfriend.
- Queer Eye for the Straight Guy. "Queer Eye For The Shy Guy" (2004): a straight man is made over to attend a speed dating party.
- 60 Minutes II. "60 Minutes II" (2004): Featured speed dating in the segment called "Love in the 21st Century"
- The Vicar of Dibley. "Happy New Year" (2005): Geraldine Granger receives a ticket to a speed dating event for her 40th birthday.
- Beauty and the Geek. "Episode 204" (2006): Featured speed dating as one of the challenges faced by the "geeks".
- The Bill. "Episode 405" (2006): Yvonne Hemmingway persuades Honey Harman to go with her to a speed-dating event.
- The L Word. "Lifeline" (2006): Alice and Kit go to a speed dating event.
- Various dating game shows such as The 5th Wheel
- Psych. "He Loves Me, He Loves Me Not, He Loves Me, Oops He's Dead" (2007): Shawn and Gus connect supposed "alien abductions" to a speed-dating event at a local bar, and attend undercover to solve the kidnappings.
- The Friday Night Project. "Series 5, Episode 8 – Guest Host: Rupert Everett" (2007): Justin Lee Collins and Alan Carr take Rupert Everett to a When The Music Stops speed dating event in a London bar.
- Law & Order: Special Victims Unit. "Starved" (2005): When a speed dating service is linked to three rapes, Detective Benson goes undercover to catch the culprit.
- iCarly. "iSpeed Date" (2009): After spitting in her crush's eye, Carly becomes humiliated and tries to find a new date for a popular school dance. Sam feels for Carly's frustration, and hatches a plan to get her a date. During the webshow, Sam handcuffs Carly to a chair and duct-tapes her mouth shut while asking boys from the Seattle area to apply for Carly's date. When the gang is overwhelmed by the number of boys who show up at the meeting place (Groovy Smoothies), they set up a speed-dating session. Carly then tells Sam that she must ask Gibby to go to the dance if Carly had to go with a random iCarly fanboy. When Sam goes to invite Gibby to the dance, he surprisingly turns her down. She discovers Gibby has a girlfriend, Tasha. When Carly's pick, Austin, keeps interrupting her conversations, she reaches her breaking point, she screams "shut up" at him and then tells him to "get out of here". The episode ends when Sam returns to the Groovy Smoothie and sees Carly and Freddie dancing a slow dance. Upon seeing this, she silently leaves.
- Valentine (2000)
- Let's Be Friends (2005)
- Hitch (2005)
- The 40-Year-Old Virgin (2005)
- Speed-Dating (2010)
- In the UK, the Local Government Association with the Solent Peoples Theatre developed "political speed dating" in 2004. Not a niche dating event; these are run by local councils to introduce young constituents to their representatives.
- BBC, The Science of Attraction within Speed Dating
- House. "Private Lives" (2010): House, Wilson and Chase participate in a speed dating event.
- The Only Way Is Essex. "Episode 2" (2010): Kirk becomes jealous when Amy flirts with the other male speed dating attendees.
- Geek Love (2011-2013)
- The Angry Birds Movie 2 (2019)
- Love on the Spectrum (American TV series) (2022-present)

== See also ==
- Blind date
- Online dating
- Speed Networking
