= Pay to surf =

Online business model

Pay to surf (PTS) is an online business model which gained popularity in the late 1990s and experienced a significant decline following the dot-com crash. PTS companies advertised their main advantage as sharing the advertising revenue with their user base in a form of rewards for watching promotional content over the web. In order to participate, users would need to install software that tracked their browsing activities and displayed targeted advertisements. Ultimately, users receive financial compensation for their time spent browsing the web.

== Process ==
A PTS company provided their members with a program to be installed on personal computers which facilitated the display of advertiser banner ads while a member browsed the web. As the company's view bar software allows tracking of websites that the user visited, the PTS company was able to display targeted ads for their advertisers. These advertisers paid the PTS company a small amount (typically US$0.50) for every hour a member surfed the internet.

PTS Member payments were typically finite due to the limited amount of time per month (typically 20 hours) for which they could surf, and the fee that they paid each new member referred to the company (typically US$0.05–0.10 per recruit). A member was able to recruit as many new members as possible, and to make a profit encouraged some users to spam referrals. This action was officially forbidden per the User's Agreement and strictly regulated, especially among minors, who needed the consent of their parents or legal guardians to use this business model.

== PTS companies ==
AllAdvantage is an example of a company which used a PTS business model. It launched in March 1999 and grew to 13 million members after one year of launching using the multi-level marketing system of recruiting new members. The scheme largely capitalized on the notion that anyone could make money on the internet with little effort, under the slogan "Get Paid to Surf the Web".

PTS companies attracted people who attempted to defraud the company out of money and members of the company were frequently forced to terminate their accounts due to spammers. Software utilities started appearing which allowed users to simulate surfing activity and some users also created mechanical mouse-moving devices which ran around their desks (i.e. "JiggyMouse"). These programs and devices allowed users to get paid simply for leaving their computers on. This trend began an arms race between the PTS companies who built fraud-prevention software to avoid such exploitation of the model, and fraud program developers attempting to find flaws in this software, where each would release increasingly sophisticated versions of their software. However, by late 2001 with the dot-com bubble's collapse, major PTS companies went out of business, as their sole revenue source was internet advertising.

The few surviving PTS companies mostly operate on a rewards-based structure where users surf the web or do tasks such as answering marketing email and shopping at specific stores to obtain reward points that can be exchanged for gifts. Startups such as Agloco rehashed the concept as "pay-you-for-your-attention" scheme wherein an Internet user is paid in exchange for the surfing interruption or paid in exchange for information about themselves and their Internet habits. A web browser called Brave offered income-sharing feature with its users who opt to view its advertisements. It was designed by JavaScript creator Brendan Eich and Brian Bondy. Brave also proposed an alternate way of compensation for browsing, as users were given tokens, promised that they will eventually be exchangeable for dollars, operating in a similar manner to cryptocurrency.

== See also ==
- Adware
- Affiliate marketing
- Basic Attention Token
- Browser toolbar
- Cost per impression
- Paid to click
- Pay per click
