= Paid to click =

Online business model

Paid to click (PTC) is an online business model that draws online traffic from people aiming to earn money from home. PTC websites act as intermediaries between advertisers and consumers; the advertiser pays for displaying ads on the PTC website, and a part of this payment goes to the viewer when they view the advertisement.

The PTC model shares some similarities with pay to surf as both of these models use referral marketing as a promotional method. Furthermore, the PTC model is usually combined with a variety of additional ways to earn, such as completing surveys and simple tasks, playing games, shopping, etc. Users can then redeem their earnings for cash through payment processors as well as a variety of gift cards.

== Controversies and criticism ==
The viability of the PTC business model has been questioned, as fraudulent clicks have ramped up the expenses for advertisers. With lawsuits filed against the internet search companies, the burden has been placed on advertisers to determine valid clicks from fraudulent ones and request reimbursement.

A criticism leveled towards the PTC business model involves the notion that a Ponzi scheme could potentially attempt to market itself as a successful Internet advertising services company under the guise of a PTC website. The most notable case of this being Traffic Monsoon, charged with this tactic, via a complaint filed by the U.S. Securities and Exchange Commission (SEC).

== See also ==
- Adware
- Affiliate marketing
- Browser toolbar
- Cost per impression
- Internet fraud
- Loyalty program
- Pay to surf
- Reward website
- Work-at-home scheme
