= Jeffrey Rayport =

American scholar

== Education ==
Rayport earned an A.B. from Harvard College, an M.Phil. in International Relations at the University of Cambridge (U.K.), and an A.M. and Ph.D. in the History of American Civilization at Harvard University. He was the John Harvard Scholar at Emmanuel College, University of Cambridge.

== Career ==
Rayport is a currently a member of the faculty in the Entrepreneurial Management Unit at Harvard Business School. He is an authority on information-intensive industries such as media and entertainment, retail, and financial services. Prior to re-joining the HBS faculty, he founded or co-founded businesses in digital strategy and advisory services, executive development, e-learning, and software simulation, while he served as a senior partner at Monitor Deloitte.

He has published a series of MBA-level textbooks on e-Commerce and a bestselling business book on integrating multi-channel customer experiences. In 1996, his Fast Company article "The Virus of Marketing" introduced the concept of, and coined the term, "viral marketing."

Previously a faculty member at Harvard Business School, where he was voted outstanding professor in 1997, 1998 and 1999. At HBS, Rayport developed and taught the first graduate-level e-commerce course in the United States, "Managing Marketspace Businesses" in 1995. Business plans produced by Rayport's students resulted in various high-tech start-ups, including Yahoo!

He has served as a director of several public and private corporations; current directorships include Andrews McMeel Universal, GSI Commerce (NASDAQ:GSIC), International Data Group, Conversant (part of Alliance Data), MediaMath, Monster Worldwide (NYSE:MWW), and ShopRunner. He also serves on the advisory boards of advertising agency Crispin Porter + Bogusky and public relations firms FleishmanHillard and Brodeur Partners (both units of Omnicom Group; NYSE: OMC). In addition, he is a trustee of the Peabody Essex Museum in Salem, MA; a director of the Nantucket Preservation Trust in Nantucket, MA; and chairman of the board at From the Top (a classical music program distributed in the United States by National Public Radio) in Boston, MA.

=== Notable Students ===
Facebook Chief Operating Officer Sheryl Sandberg was a student of Rayport during his tenure at Harvard Business School.

== e-Commerce ==
In his 2000 book e-Commerce, with Bernard Jaworski, Rayport formulates a set of design principles for e-Commerce websites, called the "7 C's":

- Context: Site's layout and design
- Content: Text, pictures, sound and video, that the web pages contain
- Community: The ways sites enable user to user communication
- Customization: Site's ability to self-tailor to different users or to allow users to personalize the site
- Communication: The ways sites enable site-to-user communication or two way communication
- Connection: Degree site is linked to other sites.
- Commerce: Site's capabilities to enable commercial transaction

== Publications ==
- Rayport, Jeffrey F. and Sviokla, John J. (1994) Managing in the Marketspace, Harvard Business Review, November/December 1994.
- Rayport, Jeffrey F. and Sviokla, John J. (1995) Exploiting the Virtual Value Chain, Harvard Business Review, November/December 1995.
- Rayport, Jeffrey F. and Hagel, John III (1997) The Coming Battle for Customer Information, Harvard Business Review, January/February 1997.
- Rayport, Jeffrey F. and Leonard, Dorothy (1997) Spark Innovation through Empathic Design, Harvard Business Review, November/December 1997.
- Rayport, Jeffrey F, The Truth About Internet Business Models, Strategy & Business, Third Quarter 1999
- Rayport, Jeffrey F. and Jaworski, Bernard J. (2000) E-Commerce, McGraw-Hill/Irwin MarketspaceU
- Rayport, Jeffrey F. and Jaworski, Bernard J. (2001) Cases in E-Commerce, McGraw-Hill/Irwin MarketspaceU
- Rayport, Jeffrey F. and Jaworski, Bernard J. (2002) Introduction to E-Commerce, McGraw-Hill/Irwin MarketspaceU
- Rayport, Jeffrey F. (2008) It's Down to Two: Microsoft and Google, BusinessWeek February 4, 2008
- Rayport, Jeffrey F. (2008) Where Is Advertising Going? Into 'Stitials, Harvard Business Review, May 2008.
- Rayport, Jeffrey F. (2008) Why Ballmer Bailed on Yahoo, BusinessWeek May 10, 2008
