= EPrivacy Group =

ePrivacy Group was a privacy consulting and anti-spam technology firm, founded in 2000 by David Brussin, Stephen Cobb, James Koenig, Michael Miora, and Vincent Schiavone. The team was later joined by privacy pioneers Ray Everett and Terry Pittman.

Headquartered in Malvern, Pennsylvania, ePrivacy Group engaged in privacy consulting while developing several email-related products. Consulting clients included Microsoft MSN and Pharmacia. The company's Trusted Sender email authentication application was one of the first anti-phishing technologies, successfully deployed by several organizations such as TrustArc and American Education Services.

In 2003 the company proposed the Trusted Email Open Standard, an open version of the Trusted Sender technology. According to one of the company's founders, the 35-page white paper outlining the standard was downloaded over 18,000 times in the first three months of publication.

ePrivacy Group also developed an anti-spam technology known as "SpamSquelcher" which was later spun off to another company, TurnTide Inc. In 2004 TurnTide was sold to Symantec for $28 million and ePrivacy Group was dissolved. The SpamSquelcher and Turntide technology became the Symantec Traffic Shaper.
