= Leaps and Bounds (playplace) =

Entertainment company in the United States

Leaps and Bounds was a chain of indoor play-places that was started by McDonald's in 1991. The main attraction was a tube maze complex with ball pits. They hosted children's birthday parties where pizza and cake were served. There were arcade-style games that awarded tickets for cheap prizes.

Leaps and Bounds' buildings had colorful exterior design elements of tubes, blocks, and circles to resemble the tube mazes the play-place featured. "Play with Purpose" was their slogan. It merged with competitor Discovery Zone in 1995, whose assets were later bought out by Chuck E. Cheese in 1999.
