= Discovery Zone =

Family entertainment center chain

- 1989–1998 logo
- Type: Public (1993–1997); Private (1997–2001)
- Traded as: Nasdaq: DZ
- Industry: Fast food and entertainment
- Founded: October 1989; 37 years ago in Kansas City, Missouri, U.S.
- Founder: Ronald Matsch; Jim Jorgensen; Dr. David Schoenstadt
- Defunct: 1999; 27 years ago (general operations); December 2001 (dissolution)
- Fate: Bankruptcy and liquidation
- Successor: Chuck E. Cheese
- Headquarters: Wilmington, Delaware, U.S.
- Number of locations: 203 (May 1998)
- Area served: United States; Canada; Puerto Rico
- Products: Family entertainment centers
- Owner: Independent (1989–1995); Blockbuster Video (1995–1997); Wellspring Associates LLC (1997–2001)

Discovery Zone (DZ) was an American chain of entertainment facilities featuring games and elaborate indoor mazes designed for young children, including roller slides, climbing play structures, and ball pits. It also featured arcade games. A talking robot character named Z-Bop served as mascot to the chain. Ronald Matsch, Jim Jorgensen and Dr. David Schoenstadt founded Discovery Zone in 1989, with the first location opening in Kansas City, Missouri, in October 1989. An early investor in and vocal supporter of the company was tennis player Billie Jean King.

Discovery Zone became the first corporate sponsor of the PBS children's program Sesame Street in 1998 after 29 years without on-air support from them.

The company filed for bankruptcy in 1999 and dissolved itself in 2001.

== History ==
Founded in 1989, Discovery Zone grew quickly, opening 15 stores in 18 months. In April 1993, Blockbuster Video invested $10.3 million (~$20.7 million in 2025) into Discovery Zone to purchase 20% of the company with an option to increase its stake to 50.1 percent in June 1994.

In June 1993, Discovery Zone went public on the NASDAQ exchange, raising $55 million (~$111 million in 2025) on the IPO. The stock rose 61% in the first day of trading.

Under the leadership of then CEO Don Flynn, in July 1994, Discovery Zone bought 45 Leaps and Bounds stores from McDonald's for $111 million in stock and 57 franchised stores from Blockbuster Video for $91 million in stock bringing the total stores to almost 300. At the same time, Blockbuster bought more shares of Discovery Zone giving it 50.1% of the stock.

Blockbuster took total management control of Discovery Zone in April 1995. Viacom had plans to cross market Discovery Zone with its other businesses, such as Nickelodeon, Paramount Pictures, and Showtime. By the time Viacom took control of Discovery Zone, the company signed a deal with Saban Entertainment to include characters from the Mighty Morphin Power Rangers television series at the play centers. Discovery Zone had also planned a new family entertainment center to compete against Dave & Buster’s, which was dubbed “Metro Zone”. The new complexes would have included dining, drinking, mini golf and VR games in addition to the indoor playground equipment that Discovery Zone is known for.

Stretched thin by expansion, changes in management tried to save the company; however, Discovery Zone filed for Chapter 11 bankruptcy protection on March 26, 1996, in Wilmington, Delaware, with debts of up to $366.8 million. They emerged a year later on July 30, under the private ownership of Wellspring Associates LLC.

Wellspring Associates invested $20 million towards improving Discovery Zone's fun centers starting in 1998. The size of the "Mega Zone" play structure and toddler play area were decreased to make room for a sports challenge area and laser tag area themed to third-party properties and a karaoke stage, while arts & crafts activities were placed in the former Quiet Zone.

On April 20, 1999, Discovery Zone, Inc. re-entered Chapter 11 bankruptcy protection. Discovery Zone abruptly closed 106 of its 128 locations on June 25, unable to alert visitors with reserved parties. Twenty locations which remained open (thirteen owned and seven leased) and the company's intellectual properties and trade names were sold to CEC Entertainment, Inc., owner of Chuck E. Cheese's, who attempted to accommodate last minute party reschedulings over the following days. Ten locations were converted to Chuck E. Cheese's while the others were sold to third-parties.

In June 2000, Discovery Zone's bankruptcy court judge ruled that there was no feasible way for the company to be profitable, and their bankruptcy was converted into liquidation. By the end of 2001, Discovery Zone was out of business completely.
