= Ball pit =

Padded box or pool filled with small colorful hollow plastic balls

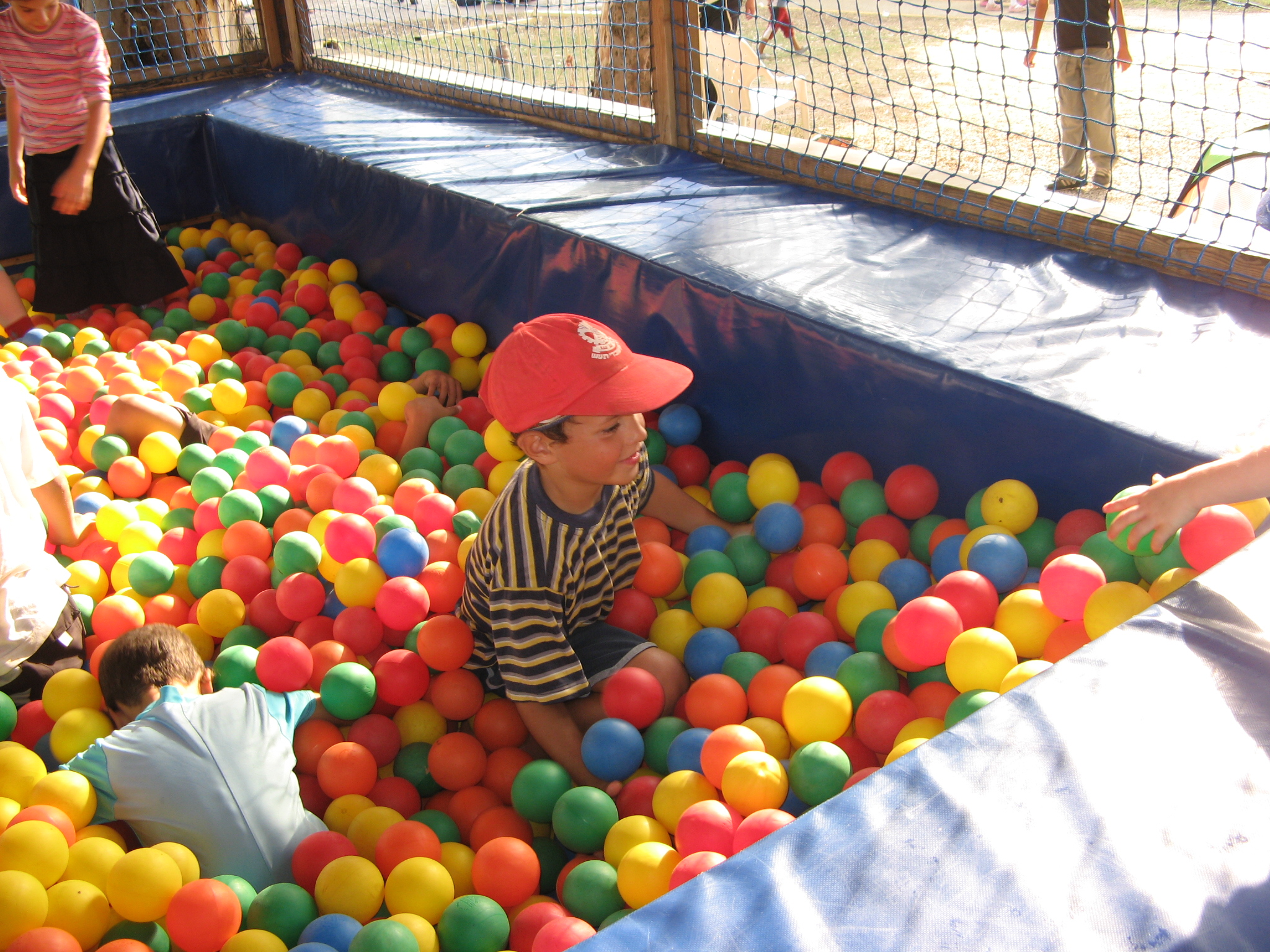
Children playing in a ball pit

A ball pit (originally called a ball crawl, also known as a ball pool or ball pond) is a padded box or pool filled with small colorful hollow plastic balls generally no larger than 3 inches (7.6 cm) in diameter. They are typically marketed as recreation and exercise for children.

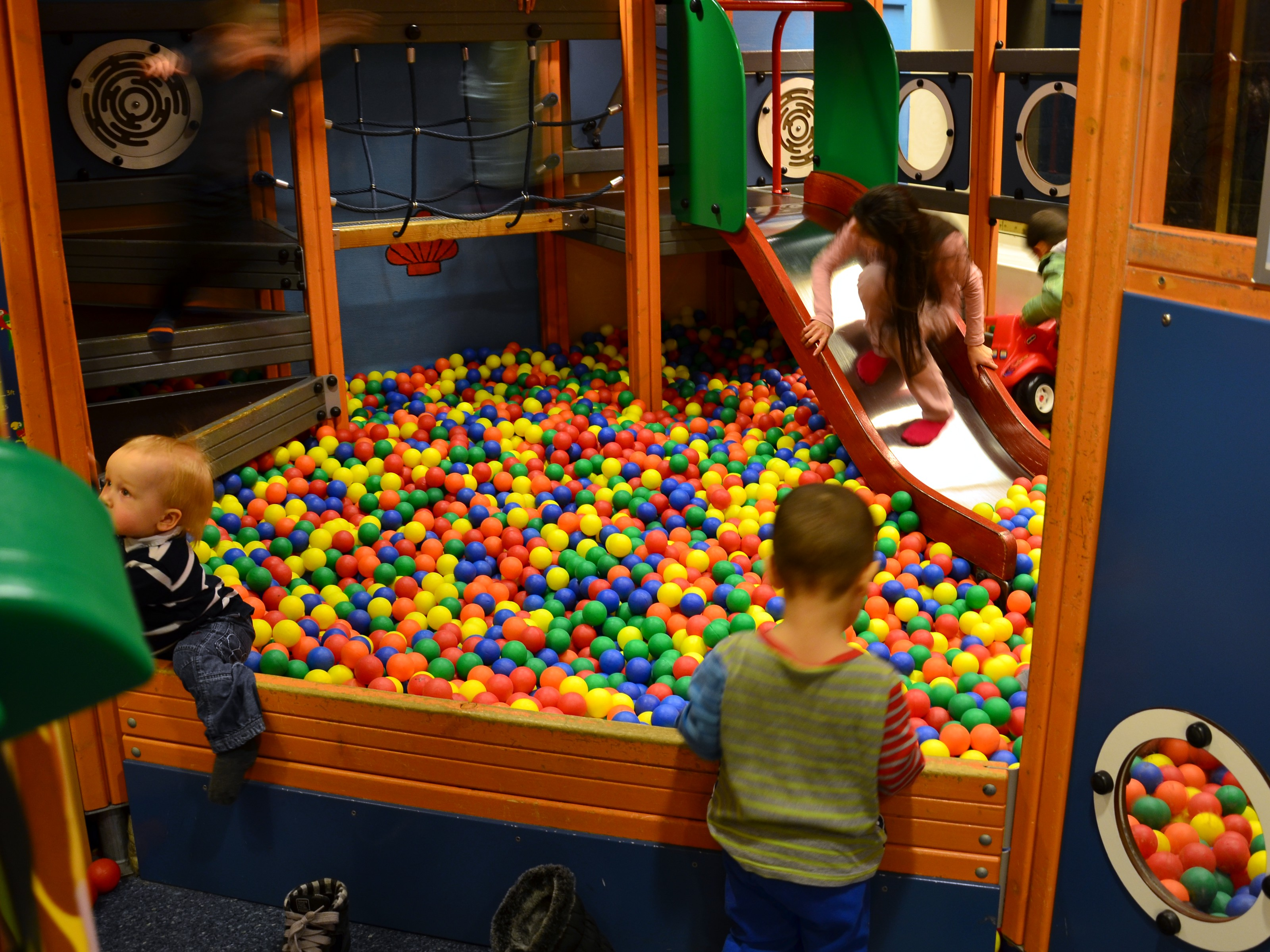
A ball pit as part of a larger play area

Ball pit in use

They are sometimes found at nurseries, carnivals, amusement parks, fun centers, fast-food restaurants, and large video arcades, frequently incorporated into larger play structures such as mazes, slides and jungle gyms. They may be rented for parties, and smaller versions are sold for home use. Ball pits are also sometimes used in therapy and educational settings, as they can provide a stimulating and sensory-rich environment.

== Age for ball pit ==
Generally, ball pits are considered safe and enjoyable for children who are at least 10 months old and able to sit up and move independently. At this age, they have better head and neck control, reducing the risk of accidental suffocation in the ball pit.

== History ==
Eric McMillan is credited with creating the first ball pit in 1976 at SeaWorld Captain Kids World in San Diego, US as a result of his experience at Ontario Place in Canada. However, IKEA claims that they had a ball pit in 1971 in Kungens Kurva, Sweden, which was designed by the duo Charlotte Rude and Hjördis Olsson-Une, who drew inspiration from plastic packing materials and bean bags.

During the late 1970s and 1980s, ball pits became more popular with the rise of indoor, "soft play" environments to address increasing child safety and liability concerns. McMillan included an 80,000-ball pit at Sesame Place near Philadelphia when the park opened in 1980, and the pits soon became a standard feature of family entertainment centers and fast-food chains in the 1980s and 1990s, including Chuck E. Cheese, Discovery Zone, and McDonald's PlayPlaces (introduced in 1987). In the 2000s, cleanliness and maintenance concerns led several chains to remove ball pits, with Chuck E. Cheese removing its last ball pit in 2011.

== Urban legends ==
Beginning in the late 1990s, a number of urban legends arose about children being severely injured or killed in ball pit encounters with vipers or hypodermic needles. There is no truth to these stories.

== In popular culture ==
In China Miéville's short story "The Ball Room" (Looking for Jake), the ghost of a child who died in a ball pit haunts a local IKEA-like store.

In the Johnny Bravo episode "Johnny Meets Donny Osmond", Donny pushes Johnny into a fast-food ball pit, where he comes across a young boy who claims to have been there since the age of five.

In the Rugrats episode "Piggy's Pizza Palace", the Rugrats jump on a costumed pig named Piggy as an act of revenge to get Angelica's tickets back. It causes the ball pit structure to split open, and the balls fall out all over the restaurant.

In season 3 episode 14 ("The Einstein Approximation") of the TV series The Big Bang Theory, Sheldon seeks inspiration in a ball pit at a shopping mall, then hides from Leonard, who then tries to retrieve Sheldon from the pit.

In 2014, a YouTube vlogger under the name Roman Atwood made a video of transforming the living room of his home into a massive ball pit, intended as a prank for his girlfriend who had returned from a trip. He later collaborates with another vlogger, Freddie Wong, to create a comedy video involving giant ball pit and "ball monster" prank.

== See also ==
- Inflatable castle
- DashCon, for the "extra hour in the ball pit" meme
