= Infomediary =

Personal agent working with consumers

An infomediary works as a personal agent on behalf of consumers to help them take control over information gathered about them for use by marketers and advertisers. The concept of the infomediary was first suggested by former McKinsey consultant John Hagel III and former Harvard Business School professor Jeffrey Rayport in their article The Coming Battle for Customer Information. The concept was explored in greater depth in Hagel's book (co-authored with McKinsey partner Marc Singer) Net Worth: Shaping Markets When Customers Make the Rules.

Infomediaries operate on the assumption that personal information is the property of the individual described, not necessarily the property of the one who gathers it. The infomediary business model recognizes that there is value in this personal data and the infomediary seeks to act as a trusted agent, providing the opportunity and means for clients to monetize and profit from their own information profiles.

One of the first focused implementations of the infomediary concept was an online advertising company called AllAdvantage launched in 1999. While that company did not survive the bursting of the "dot-com bubble," in more recent years there has been renewed interest in the infomediary concept, with entrepreneurs and investors building companies to identify and leverage the market value of consumers' information.

In the policy realm, a related concept known as the "information fiduciary" has been proposed by legal scholar Jack Balkin in which a set of legal and ethical obligations apply directly to the companies who hold data, rather than relying on an independent trusted third-party. The jurisdiction surrounding the concept of infomediation remains unclear. It is difficult to legally define the responsibility of the infomediary, which is by definition neither the host nor the publisher of the content it makes available.
