= Speed networking =

Meeting format designed to accelerate business contacts

Speed networking (or speed business meeting) is a meeting format designed to accelerate business contacts.

Speed networking basically involves participants gathering together to exchange information. Participants greet each other in a series of brief exchanges during a set period of time. During an interaction, participants share their professional backgrounds and business goals. Networkers are generally seeking exposure to new markets and/or expanding their pool of vendors.

== History ==
Speed networking is often referenced as a derivative of speed dating, the round-robin approach to meeting potential suitors first developed by Rabbi Yaacov Deyo in the late 1990s.

Speed networking combines speed dating with business networking. It is thought to have started in the United States and/or the United Kingdom. Speed networking was first utilized during the early 2000s and began rising in popularity by the end of the decade.

Credit for applying speed dating concepts to the corporate world has been attributed to Tom Jaffee, a founder of a speed-dating network. In the United Kingdom, speed networking was introduced by Michael Piddock, future founder of event technology company Glisser, to increase employee-to-employee connections in corporate events.

Although the techniques for speed dating and speed networking can be similar – participants paired or grouped together for the purpose of introduction – the practices differ in their end goals. Speed daters are trying to narrow down their choices by eliminating the unsuitable; conversely, speed networkers are trying to broaden their connections by increasing their exposure.

== Organization ==
Speed networking is based on three models

- Round Robin - meeting random participants one-on-one sequentially.
- Station-based - meeting specific participants based on pre-assignments.
- Group-based - meeting with a preselected group.

Most speed networking events begin in an open room for Participants to mingle. The host then explains the structure of the event. The moderator will place time limits on the participants interactions, telling them when the time intervals have expired. if the event calls for participants to move to preassigned tables or groups, the moderator will facilitate this.

== Models/modalities ==
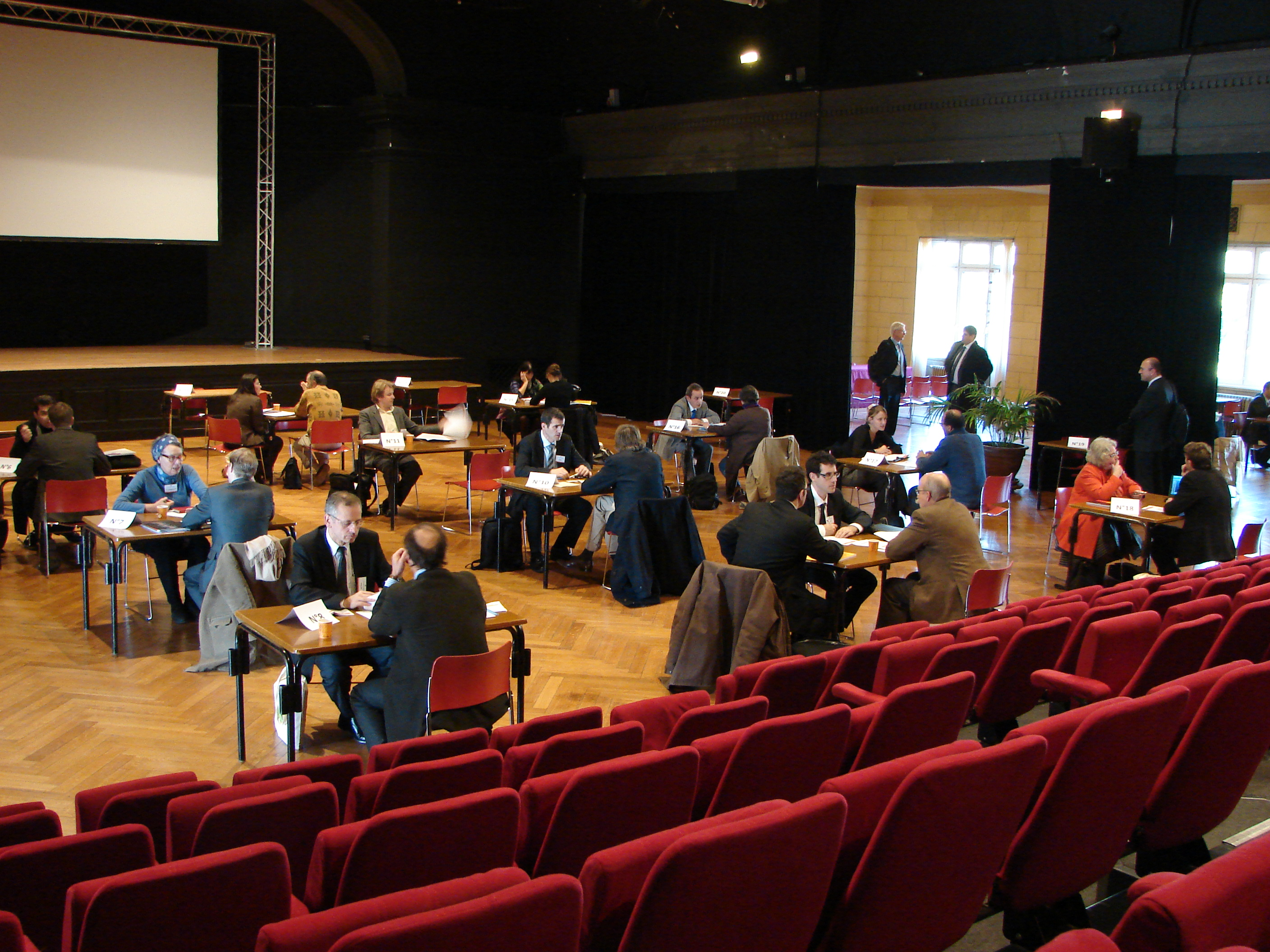
One to one speed networking

=== Round robin ===
In the Round Robin model, participants meet each other sequentially in random pairings. To facilitate movement of participants, the chairs in the room are often organized in two circles or facing rows of desks.

The host opens the first round of meetings, usually with a bell or buzzer. The two participants in each meeting introduce themselves, briefly summarizing their business histories and goals. They often exchange business cards and possibly additional information for a follow-up meeting.

After a set time period of a few minutes, the host stops the first round of meetings. Then either the inner or outer circle participants – or the front or back line of desks – moves to the next space. Following a brief settling-in period, the host starts the second round of meetings.

In Round Robin speed networking, a participant would meet an average of 10 contacts during an hour-long event.

=== Station-based ===
In the Station-based model, participants meet each other individually based on a pre-assignment. Prior to coming to the event, participants fill out a questionnaire listing their business background (job title and industry) and whom they wish to meet (suppliers, customers or vendors). The profiles are then matched electronically and a list of meetings is generated for participants based on their preferences. At the event, numbered stations are set up where participants meet with their assigned partners according to their list for a set period of time. A typical station-based speed networking event may yield 7 to 10 contacts during an hour-long event.

=== Group-based ===
In the Group-based model, participants are assigned to a sequence of tables. Each table seats a specific number of participants, depending on attendance. A typical event may call for tables of four to 10. Table assignments are often predetermined by computer software but other techniques can be used to determine the groups each attendee participates in. Each participant at the table takes a few minutes – the length of these introductions can also be set – to introduce him or herself. Time at the table varies based on how the event organiser coordinate the event but usually lasts five to 15 minutes.

== Applications ==
Speed networking has many applications. Many organizations use speed networking to structure events: alumni associations, chambers of commerce, business associations, universities and trade shows. Events that benefit from speed networking include: membership drives, networking events, mentoring programs, career fairs, team building exercises and vendor pairings. When the speed networking goal is to find a job, the event is usually called "job dating". Speed networking is particularly useful "when many organisations are gathering at large events."

=== Speed Mentoring ===
In speed mentoring, the goal is to facilitate suitable relationships between mentors and mentees. Speed mentoring sessions are typically "a series of short, focused conversations about specific questions. You will meet with a limited number of mentees in 10-minute time slots each. When directed, mentees will proceed to their mentor's table."

Speed mentoring is effective because the mentee experiences several different interactions with prospective mentors in a short period of time. This maximises the opportunity to find a suitable mentor.

Speed mentoring events can be traced back to the architectural profession. In 2001–2003, Grace H. Kim, through her work as the Intern Development Program (IDP) Washington State Coordinator advocated for interns to find a mentor outside their firm. However, she found that many young interns, especially those new to Seattle, had a difficult time identifying potential mentors. In 2006, after Kim and Lee W. Waldrep, Ph.D. co-hosted an American Institute of Architecture Students (AIAS) salon on mentorship at the National American Institute of Architects Convention (Los Angeles, CA), the idea of Speed Mentoring was born.

At the 2007 National AIA Convention (San Antonio, TX), Kim and Waldrep co-presented a session entitled Speed Mentoring: Developing You, an Emerging Professional and over 100 attendees participated - representing the spectrum of interns to senior leadership. After a brief overview of mentorship and the available resources, this interactive session required attendees to participate in a live demonstration of the program. They were asked to stand in a line based on their number of years in the profession. Then the line was folded in half and individuals were asked to move their chairs to face one another. A bell was rung at which time the two facing individuals traded business cards, introduced themselves and shared what they were looking for in a mentoring relationship. At five minutes, the bell was rung again and one row of people moved two seats down. This process was repeated four times. While they were not asked to rank their top choices, the idea was that if this exercise were repeated at a local chapter or in a large office, the interns could rank their mentor preferences. And likewise, the mentor could rank their preferences for a protégé – hopefully resulting in a better mentor match. The session was a success and was subsequently repeated at two National AIA Conventions (Boston and San Francisco). More importantly, the participants took the idea home to implement in various settings.

== Speed mentoring sponsors ==
Some universities have also established speed mentoring events including:

- University of Kentucky, which has also developed a mentorship tool kit.
- City College of New York
- California Polytechnic State University (San Luis Obispo)
- University of Maryland
- University of California - Berkeley.

Other industries in which speed mentoring events have been publicized include:

- International Interior Design Association (NY Chapter) – Oct 10, 2012 (Annual)
- NEWH (Hospitality Industry Network)
- American Society of Media Photographers
- Information Architecture Institute
- Wings of Hope (UK)
- Women of the World Festivals (UK)

== Advantages and disadvantages ==
Speed networking has advantages over typical meet-and-greet events.

=== For participants ===
Speed networking facilitates the meeting of individuals who may not have had the opportunity to exchange information without a structured environment. Each attendee is "guaranteed to meet more people than [he/she] typically would using traditional networking during the same amount of time." It relieves participants of the stress of introductions as attendees all have a single purpose. It rids the awkward "exit" by having time limits – no need to find a way to bow out of a conversation gracefully – and therefore increases the number of potential new meets.

However, there are also risks for attendees, and these relate to an unfortunate perception that a business relationship can also be speed-tracked, as well as a misconception that quantity is of prime importance. Members still need to take time to develop relationships with individual fellow members outside the networking event and the importance of this cannot be overestimated. Other principles of good networking, such as an attitude of giving, not pushing, business cards or marketing material at people, for example, still stand. People can not just drop in during a round robin event as it disrupts the flow and matching.

=== For hosts ===
Speed networking positions the host as an expert in information exchange and business leadership. It adds value to organizations whose structure is innate to business mingling, like alumni associations and chambers of commerce.

The different speed networking models have their own benefits. Group-based speed networking, for example, provides the opportunity to meet a maximum number of people with less stress on the participant or repetition of one's personal information.
