= Professional network service =

Type of social network

A professional network service (or, in an Internet context, simply a professional network) is a type of social network service that focuses on interactions and relationships for business opportunities and career growth, with less emphasis on activities in personal life.

A professional network service is used by working individuals, job-seekers, and businesses to establish and maintain professional contacts, to find work or hire employees, share professional achievements, sell or promote services, and stay up-to-date with industry news and trends. According to LinkedIn managing director Clifford Rosenberg in an interview with AAP in 2010, "[t]his is a call to action for professionals to re-address their use of social networks and begin to reap as many rewards from networking professionally as they do personally." Businesses mostly depend on resources and information outside the company and to get what they need, they need to reach out and professionally network with others, such as employees or clients as well as potential opportunities.

"Nardi, Whittaker, and Schwarz (2002) point out three main tasks that they believe networkers need to attend to keep a successful professional (intentional) network: building a network, maintaining the network, and activating selected contacts. They stress that networkers need to continue to add new contacts to their network to access as many resources as possible and to maintain their network by staying in touch with their contacts. This is so that the contacts are easy to activate when the networker has work that needs to be done."

By using a professional network service, businesses can keep all of their networks up-to-date, and in order, and helps figure out the best way to efficiently get in touch with each of them. A service that can do all that helps relieve some of the stress when trying to get things done.

Not all professional network services are online sites that help promote a business. Some services connect the user to other services that help promote the business other than online sites, such as phone/Internet companies that provide services and companies that specifically are designed to do all of the promoting, online and in person, for a business.

== History ==
In 1997, professional network services started up throughout the world and continue to grow. The first recognizable site to combine all features, such as creating profiles, adding friends, and searching for friends, was SixDegrees.com. According to Boyd and Ellison's article, "Social Network Sites: Definition, History, and Scholarship", from 1997 to 2001, several community tools began supporting various combinations of profiles and publicly articulated Friends. Boyd and Ellison go on to say that the next wave began with Ryze.com in 2001. It was introduced as a new way "to help people leverage their business networks".

== Inside the works ==
Quite a lot of work is put into a professional network service, such as the number of hours that go into them and the type of people they work for, as well as the business model of it all, such as the professional interaction and the multiple services they deal with.

=== Types of services ===
Some professional network services not only help promote the business but can also help in connecting to other people. Those services may include a specific phone and/or Internet company or a company that helps to connect with other businesses. According to the Society for New Communications Research (SNCR), there are at least nine online professional networks that are being used.

=== Professional interaction ===
Kaplan and Haenlein elaborate on five key considerations for companies when utilizing media. These include the importance of careful selection, the option to choose existing applications or develop custom ones, ensuring alignment with organizational activities, integrating a comprehensive media plan, and providing accessibility to all stakeholders.

==== Choose carefully ====
"Choosing the right medium for any given purpose depends on the target group to be reached and the message to be communicated. On one hand, each Social Media application usually attracts a certain group of people, and firms should be active wherever their customers are present. On the other hand, there may be situations whereby certain features are necessary to ensure effective communication, and these features are only offered by one specific application."

==== Ensure activity alignment ====
"Sometimes you may decide to rely on various Social Media, or a set of different applications within the same group, to have the largest possible reach." "Using different contact channels can be a worthwhile and profitable strategy." According to the Society for New Communications Research at Harvard University, "the average professional belongs to 3–5 online networks for business use, and LinkedIn, Facebook, and Twitter are among the top used."

==== Integrate a media plan ====
Social media and traditional media are "both part of the same: your corporate image" in the customers' eyes.

==== Allow access to all ====
"...once the firm has decided to utilize Social Media applications, it is worth checking that all employees may access them." According to the SNCR, "the convergence of Internet, mobile, and social media has taken significant shape as professionals rely on anywhere access to information, relationships, and networks."

==== Online usage ====
"Half of the respondents report participating in 3 to 5 online professional networks. Another three in ten participate in 6 or more professional networks." "Popular social networks are now being used frequently as Professional Communities. More than nine in ten respondents indicated that they use LinkedIn and half reported using Facebook. Twitter and blogs were frequently listed as 'professional networks'."

=== Business model ===
According to Michael Rappa's article, Business models on the Web", "a business model is the method of doing business by which a company can sustain itself – that is, generate revenue. The business model spells out how a company makes money by specifying where it is positioned in the value chain." Rappa mentions that there are at least nine basic categories from which a business model can be separated. Those categories are a brokerage, advertising, infomediary, merchant, manufacturer, affiliate, community, subscription, and utility. "...a firm may combine several different models as part of its overall Internet business strategy." At first, Flickr started as a way to mainstream public relations.

== Social impact ==
When it comes to the social impact that professional network services have on today's society, it has proved to increase activity. According to the SNCR, "[t]hree quarters of respondents rely on professional networks to support business decisions. Reliance has increased for essentially all respondents over the past three years. Younger (20–35) and older professionals (55+) are more active users of social tools than middle-aged professionals. More people are collaborating outside their company wall than within their organizational intranet."

== Limitations ==
Since the internet and social media are a part of this "world where consumers can speak so freely with each other and businesses have increasingly less control over the information available about them in cyberspace", most firms and businesses are uncomfortable with all the freedom. According to Kaplan and Haenlein's article, "Users of the world, unite! The challenges and opportunities of Social Media", businesses are pushed aside and are only able to sit back and watch as their customers publicly post comments, which may or may not be well-written.

== See also ==
- Business networking
- Career-oriented social networking market
- Employment website
- Freelance marketplace
- Social network service
- List of social networking websites
- Social media
- User-generated content
- Web 2.0
- Social networking sites
- Smart contract: can be used in employment contracts
- Virtual worlds
