= Brown Skin Brunchin' =

American company

- Company type: Social, business networking
- Founded: 2018
- Founders: Lillian Jackson; Melissa Mason
- Website: www.brownskinbrunchin.com

Brown Skin Brunchin' is a U.S. networking organization and online platform for women of color.

== History ==
The organization was founded in 2018 by Lillian Jackson and Melissa Mason as a monthly event in Richmond, Virginia, eventually expanding nationally. The company continued to operate during the COVID-19 pandemic, hosting virtual events for members.

In 2021 it released a professional and social networking app. Local organizers continued to hold monthly networking events.

By 2022, the company had expanded to 75 cities in the United States and Canada and had 19,000 members.
