= Trusted Email Open Standard =

Anti-spam technique

The Trusted Email Open Standard (TEOS) is an anti-spam technique proposed by the ePrivacy Group in 2003 at the Federal Trade Commission Anti-Spam Summit.

Edited by Stephen Cobb, CISSP, the 35-page white paper describing the standard was downloaded more than 30,000 times between publication in April 2003 and the end of that year. Many elements of TEOS later appeared in the letter that Microsoft CEO Bill Gates submitted to U.S. Senate Commerce Committee hearings on anti-spam legislation. The letter outlined Microsoft's position on how the spam crisis should be handled.

At its most basic level, TEOS proposes a framework of trusted identity for email senders based on secure, fast, lightweight signatures in email headers, optimized with DNS-based systems for flexibility and ease of implementation. TEOS also provides a common-language framework for making trusted assertions about the content of each individual message. ISPs and email recipients can rely on these assertions to manage their email.
