= Chief privacy officer =

Corporate senior executive

The Chief Privacy Officer (CPO) is a senior level executive within a growing number of global corporations, public agencies and other organizations, responsible for managing risks related to information privacy laws and regulations. Variations on the role often carry titles such as "Privacy Officer," "Privacy Leader," and "Privacy Counsel." However, the role of CPO differs significantly from another similarly-titled role, the Data Protection Officer (DPO), a role mandated for some organizations under the GDPR, and the two roles should not be confused or conflated.

The CPO role gradually emerged between the late 1990s and early 2000s as a strategic response by companies to public concerns about the use, collection, and protection of personal information, as well as growing regulatory pressure. The establishment of a CPO signaled the rise of privacy issues from a purely legal or technical concern to a core issue in corporate reputation management and governance risk. The CPO's role aims to strike a balance between "competitiveness in data utilization" and "public trust and compliance obligations," promoting privacy protection as a crucial component of corporate governance.

The CPO role was a response to increasing "(c)onsumer concerns over the use of personal information, including medical data and financial information along with laws and regulations." In particular, the expansion of Information Privacy Laws and new regulations governing the collection and use of personal information, such as the European Union General Data Protection Regulation (GDPR), has raised the profile and increased the frequency of having a senior executive as the leader of privacy-related compliance efforts. In addition, some laws and regulations (such as the HIPAA Security Rule) require that certain organizations within their regulatory scope must designate a privacy compliance leader.

In modern organizations, the CPO's role has transcended compliance, becoming a leader in ethical data governance and information transparency. Many CPOs typically have a higher education in law, business, or computer science, and extensive experience in privacy, compliance, or data management. They often hold relevant professional certifications, such as the Chartered Information Privacy Professional (CIPP), Chartered Information Privacy Manager (CIPM), or Chartered Information Systems Security Professional (CISSP). Overall, the CPO has evolved into a multidisciplinary, governance-focused position, situated at the intersection of law, technology, and management, representing an organization's top leadership in privacy protection and data ethics.

== History ==
In the United States, the position of chief privacy officer was first established at consumer database marketing company Acxiom in 1991 with the appointment of Jennifer Barrett as CPO. The role operated in obscurity until August 1999 when the Internet advertising technology firm AllAdvantage appointed privacy lawyer Ray Everett to the first Internet-era instance of the role. This started a trend that quickly spread among major corporations, both offline and online. The role of the Chief Privacy Officer was solidified within the U.S. corporate world in November 2000 with the naming of Harriet Pearson as Chief Privacy Officer for IBM Corporation. That event prompted one influential analyst to declare, "the chief privacy officer is a trend whose time has come."

By 2001, the non-profit research organization Privacy and American Business reported that a significant number of Fortune 500 firms had appointed senior executives with the title or role of Chief Privacy Officer. The growth of the Chief Privacy Officer trend was further fueled by the European Union's passage in the late 1990s of data privacy laws and regulations that included a requirement for all corporations to have an individual designated to be accountable for privacy compliance.

By 2002, the position of Chief Privacy Officer and similar privacy-related management positions were sufficiently widespread to support the creation of professional societies and trade associations to promote training and certification programs. In 2002 the largest of these organizations, the Privacy Officers Association and the Association of Corporate Privacy Officers, merged to form the International Association of Privacy Officers, which was later renamed the International Association of Privacy Professionals (IAPP). The IAPP holds several conferences and training seminars each year around the world, hosting association members from major global corporations and government agencies, with executives seeking certification programs in privacy management practices. In 2019, it reportedly had more than 50,000 members globally, which its leadership attributed to companies' responses to new laws like the GDPR.

In addition to developments in the private sector, public agencies in the United States have also begun appointing Chief Privacy Officers. By 2022, 21 U.S. state governments had established the role, compared to only 12 in 2019. These roles vary by state. For example, New York's CPO focuses on improving digital service experience, while Indiana's emphasizes legal compliance, and Utah's functions as a cabinet-level position confirmed by the state senate. Across many states, CPOs collaborate closely with chief information security officers (CISOs) and chief data officers (CDOs) to balance innovation, data use, and citizen privacy. The trend reflects a broader shift in government toward integrating privacy as part of digital trust and risk management frameworks rather than treating it solely as a compliance obligation.

== Responsibilities and duties ==
As data protection laws, consumer expectations and governmental scrutiny have grown, Chief Privacy Officers (CPOs) are increasingly called upon to fulfill regulatory, governance and oversight functions, beyond internal privacy programme management.

In the public sector, the Department of Homeland Security Chief Privacy Officer is empowered to ensure that deployed technologies do not erode privacy protections, to conduct privacy impact assessments of federal systems, and to evaluate legislative and regulatory proposals concerning personal information.

Typical governance-oriented responsibilities include:

- Reviewing and influencing legislation and regulation relevant to personal data and privacy.
- Leading or approving privacy impact assessments (PIAs) for new or changed systems, technologies or policies.
- Ensuring transparency to regulators, stakeholders and the public (for example by preparing reports on privacy programme effectiveness).
- Integrating privacy oversight within corporate or public governance structures (e.g., boards, audit committees, risk-management frameworks).
- Balancing organisational innovation, data utilization and compliance with legal obligations and ethical standards.

As the leader of a corporate privacy program, a CPO has a number of essential responsibilities, including:

- Managing the company's policies, procedures and data governance
- Driving privacy-related awareness and training among employees
- Leading incident response, including data breach preparedness
- Communicating privacy goals and values both internally and externally
- Designing controls for managing privacy compliance
- Assessing privacy-related risks arising from existing products and services
- Conducting Privacy Impact Assessments to identify risks in new or changed business activities
- Monitoring the effectiveness of privacy-related risk mitigation and compliance measures

Many of these activities and requirements are included in CPO job descriptions.

The role requires strong collaborative relationships with other stakeholders in an organization, including engineers and product managers (for privacy impacts to products and services), human resources (for privacy impacts to employee data), legal teams (for monitoring and interpretations of applicable laws and compliance measures), procurement and vendor management, and information technology and information security teams.

The Chief Privacy Officer is also responsible for developing and implementing policies to protect personal data, managing risks related to privacy laws and regulations, and serving as the central authority for privacy decisions.

=== Interactions with other senior roles ===
As organizations identify the need for a CPO, a frequent challenge arises in regards to placement of the role within the organization structure and the issue of overlap between similar "C-level" roles, most notably the many intersections between the roles of the CPO and the Chief Information Security Officer (CISO). While CPOs and CISOs have some overlap in responsibilities around data protection and data governance, ultimately privacy and security have different roles to play. For example, while CPOs and CISOs may both be concerned with the prevention of data breaches, responsibility for managing technical prevention measures will tend to lay with the CISO while a CPO's concerns will look more broadly at whether otherwise properly secured data is being used in ways that might place the company at legal, regulatory, or reputational risk.

Another area of potential overlap, and sometimes confusion, is the interaction between a CPO and the increasingly common role of Data Protection Officer (DPO). The DPO role is specifically required for certain organizations falling under the jurisdiction of the EU GDPR. DPOs have very specific roles, requirements, and expectations delineated in GDPR Article 39 and associated regulatory guidance, and those include a level of required independence and organizational separation that make it very different from a CPO.

== Qualifications and background ==
While a number of CPOs come from legal backgrounds and have Juris Doctor (or equivalent) degrees, the CPO role is a multidisciplinary one. The role requires an executive with an understanding of how data collection and usage, and the associated risks all factor into an organization's day-to-day business operations. CPOs also need to be aware of a range of legal, regulatory, contractual, and other factors that impact an organization's privacy risk strategy. For these reasons, many believe that a legal background is a requirement for a successful CPO. Others believe a legal background may result in too narrow of a focus.

Among other qualifications that are seen as valuable in CPOs are strong communications skills, particularly in the area of public relations. This is due to the role being partly responsible for the development and execution of public outreach strategies in the event of data breach or other data-related security incident, and the CPO often functions as the public relations face of the organization. CPOs are also often called upon to function as a lobbyist representing the organization's interests before lawmakers. CPOs are also increasingly required to have deep knowledge of the organization's data-related operational practices and technologies, as well as the interaction between compliance measures that span the realms of privacy and security.

=== Professional certification ===
An increasing number of individuals seeking careers as CPOs will seek training in multiple disciplines related to the field. Among the most common credentials seen in the space include:

- Certified Information Privacy Professional (CIPP) with regional specializations such as US, Canada, Europe, and Asia
- Certified Information Privacy Manager (CIPM)
- Certified Information Privacy Technologist (CIPT)
- Certified in Healthcare Privacy and Security (CHPS)
- Certified in Healthcare Privacy Compliance (CHPC)
- Certified Information Systems Security Professional (CISSP)

== See also ==
- Chief Privacy Officer, Department of Homeland Security
- Campus privacy officer
