= Michael Rappa =

American professor

Michael Rappa is an American professor and founding director of the Institute for Advanced Analytics at North Carolina State University. He has a PhD from the University of Minnesota and has previously worked as a professor at the Massachusetts Institute of Technology.
