= TurnTide =

American anti-spam technology company

TurnTide's logo

TurnTide Inc. was an anti-spam technology company founded in 2004 and based in Conshohocken, Pennsylvania. The firm was created as a spin-off corporation from privacy and anti-spam technology firm ePrivacy Group to bring to market the world's first anti-spam router. The technology, linking anti-spam detection algorithms with network-level flow controls, was originally marketed by ePrivacy Group under the name "SpamSquelcher".

TurnTide was acquired by Symantec six months after its creation for US$28 million. In 2006, the TurnTide technology was described as "magic" by John Katsaros at the Internet Research Group.
