= List of companies based in the Philadelphia area =

Companies in the Philadelphia area

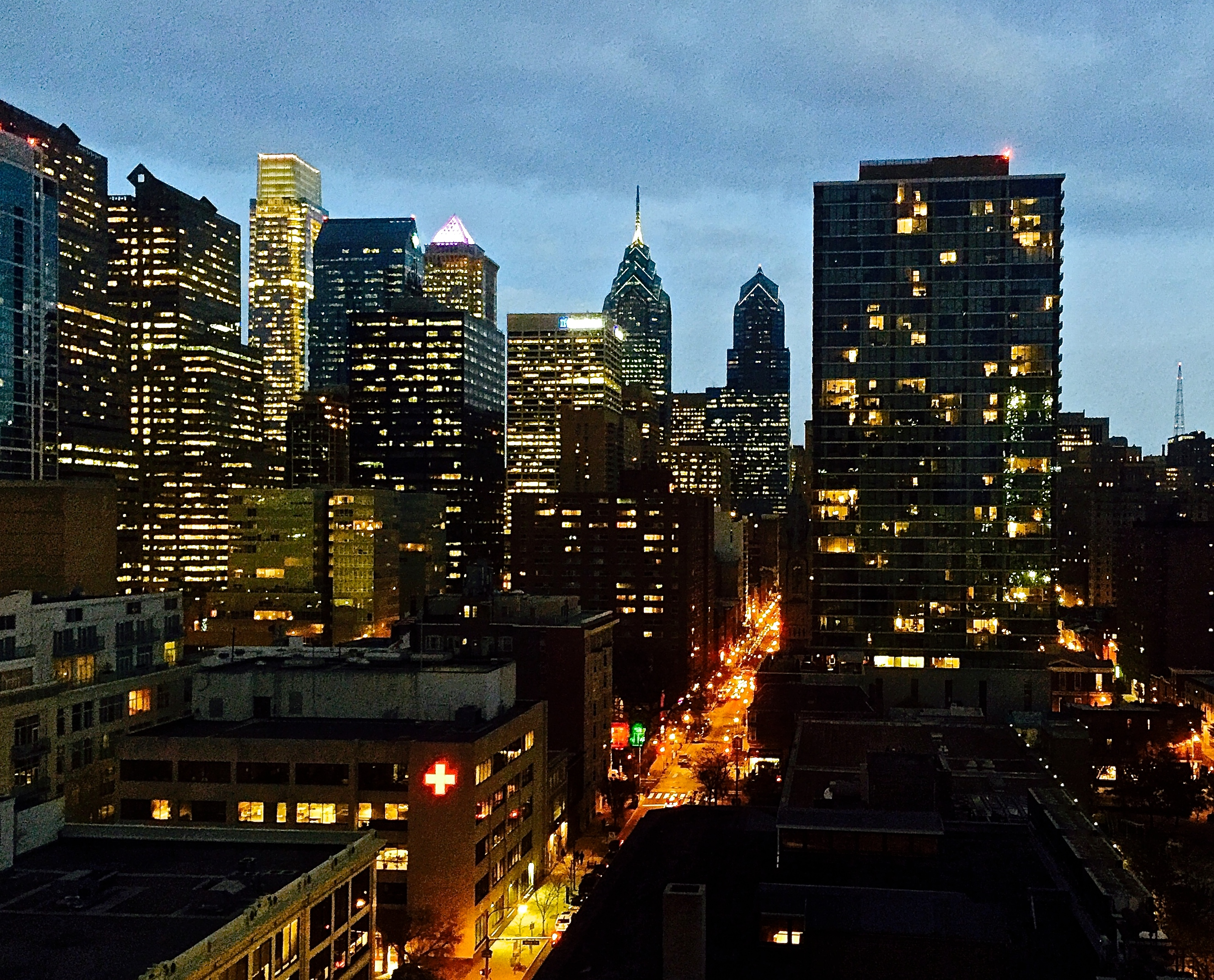
Center City Philadelphia at night in February 2016

This is a list of companies either based or with large operations in Philadelphia and its metropolitan area in the United States.

== Active companies headquartered in the region ==
Name	City	Industry	Fortune 1000 rank (2018)	Notes
ACI Technologies	Philadelphia	electronics		
Alpha Video	West Conshohocken, PA	entertainment		
Cencora	Conshohocken, PA	pharmaceutical	10	
Aramark	Philadelphia	hospitality	209	
ASTM International	West Conshohocken, PA	publishing		
Audacy	Philadelphia	media		
Avantor	Radnor, PA	specialty chemicals		
Axalta Coating Systems	Philadelphia	coatings		
Ballard Spahr	Philadelphia	law		
Bentley Systems, Inc.	Exton, PA	software engineering		
Blank Rome	Philadelphia	law		
Brandywine Realty Trust	Philadelphia	real estate		
Burlington Stores	Burlington, NJ	apparel	459 (in 2017)	
Campbell's	Camden, NJ	food	315	
Carpenter Technology Corporation	Philadelphia	metal		
Checkpoint Systems	Thorofare, NJ	manufacturing		
Chemours	Wilmington, DE	chemicals	454	
Comcast	Philadelphia	telecommunications	32	
Conrail Shared Assets Operations	Philadelphia	railroad		
Cozen O'Connor	Philadelphia	law		
Crown Holdings	Yardley, PA	packaging	313	
CSS Industries	Philadelphia	manufacturing		
CubeSmart	Malvern, PA	self-storage facilities		
Day & Zimmermann	Philadelphia	construction		
Dechert	Philadelphia	law		
Disston Precision	Philadelphia	manufacturing		
Duane Morris	Philadelphia	law		
DuckDuckGo	Paoli, PA	internet search		
DuPont	Wilmington, DE	chemicals	35	
Ellis Coffee Company	Philadelphia	coffee		
EPAM Systems	Newtown, PA	software engineering		
ERT	Philadelphia	healthcare		
Fanatics	Conshohocken, PA	ecommerce		HQ in Jacksonville, FL
Fiserv	King of Prussia, PA	financial		HQ in Brookfield, Wisconsin
Five Below	Philadelphia	retail		
FMC	Philadelphia	chemicals	581	
Fox Rothschild	Philadelphia	law		
Frankford Candy & Chocolate Company	Philadelphia	food		
Fuji Advanced Sports	Philadelphia	bicycles		
Gaming and Leisure Properties	Wyomissing, PA	real estate		
Garfield Refining	Philadelphia	precious metal refining		
Genesis HealthCare	Kennett Square, PA	healthcare		
GoPuff	Philadelphia	delivery		
Harleysville Group	Harleysville, PA	insurance		
Hill International	Philadelphia	construction		
Holtec International	Camden, NJ	nuclear power equipment		
InterDigital	Wilmington, DE	telecommunications		
Iron Stone Real Estate Partners	Philadelphia	real estate		
League Collegiate Wear	Bridgeport, PA	apparel		
Lincoln National Corporation	Radnor, PA	insurance	232	
Melior Discovery	Exton, PA	pharmaceuticals		
Money Mart	Malvern, PA	finance		
Morgan, Lewis & Bockius	Philadelphia	law		
Nutrisystem	Fort Washington, PA	food		
PECO Energy	Philadelphia	energy		
Peddler's Village	Lahaska, PA	entertainment		
PEI-Genesis	Philadelphia, PA	Electronics Distribution		HQ in Philadelphia, PA
Penn Entertainment	Wyomissing, PA	entertainment	790	
Penn Mutual	Horsham, PA	insurance		
Pepper Hamilton	Philadelphia	law		
PHH	Mount Laurel, NJ	financial		
The Philadelphia Inquirer	Philadelphia	newspapers		
PREIT	Philadelphia	real estate		
Radian Group	Philadelphia	financial		
Rita's Italian Ice	Trevose, PA	Dessert Shop		
Saxbys Coffee	Philadelphia	beverage		
Saul Ewing Arnstein & Lehr	Philadelphia	law		
Schnader Harrison Segal & Lewis	Philadelphia	law		
Sunoco	Philadelphia	oil		HQ in Dallas, TX
Susquehanna International Group	Bala Cynwyd, PA	financial		
Teleflex	Wayne, PA	medical instruments		
TLA Entertainment Group	Philadelphia	entertainment		
Toll Brothers	Fort Washington, PA	construction	791	
UGI	King of Prussia, PA	utilities	362	
Unisys	Blue Bell, PA	information technology	664	
Universal Health Services	King of Prussia, PA	healthcare	324	
Urban Outfitters	Philadelphia	apparel	715	
The Vanguard Group	Malvern, PA	financial		
Vishay Intertechnology	Malvern, PA	electronics	868	
Wawa	Wawa, PA	convenience stores		
WSFS Bank	Wilmington, DE	financial		

== Nonprofit companies headquartered in the region ==
Name	City	Industry
ACTS Retirement-Life Communities	West Point, PA	healthcare
Aria Health	Philadelphia	healthcare
Children's Hospital of Philadelphia	Philadelphia	healthcare
Cooper Health	Camden, NJ	healthcare
Crozer-Keystone Health System	Springfield, PA	healthcare
Elwyn	Elwyn, PA	healthcare
Friends Hospital	Philadelphia	healthcare
Drexel University	Philadelphia	education
Immaculata University	Malvern, PA	education
Independence Blue Cross	Philadelphia	insurance
La Salle University	Philadelphia	education
Lourdes Health System	Camden, NJ	healthcare
Monell Chemical Senses Center	Philadelphia	research
Peirce College	Philadelphia	education
Pennsylvania Academy of the Fine Arts	Philadelphia	education
Saint Joseph's University	Philadelphia	education
Temple University	Philadelphia	education
The Food Trust	Philadelphia	nutrition access
Thomas Jefferson University	Philadelphia	education
University of Pennsylvania	Philadelphia	education
Villanova University	Villanova, PA	education
Virtua	Marlton, NJ	healthcare

== US headquarters of foreign corporations ==
Name	City	Industry	Fortune 500 rank (2009)	Notes
ACE USA	Philadelphia	insurance		
Arkema	Philadelphia	chemicals		
AstraZeneca	Wilmington, DE	pharmaceuticals	268	
Endo International	Malvern, PA	pharmaceuticals		
Essity	Philadelphia	manufacturing		
GlaxoSmithKline	Philadelphia	pharmaceuticals		
HSBC Bank USA	Wilmington, DE	financial	21	
ING Direct	Wilmington, DE	financial	8	
IKEA USA	Conshohocken, PA	retail		
Ricoh USA	Exton, PA	business services		
Saint-Gobain	Malvern, PA	building materials		
SAP America	Newtown Square, PA	software		
Shire Pharmaceuticals	Wayne, PA	pharmaceuticals		
Siemens Healthcare	Malvern, PA	medical	30	
SKF	Blue Bell, PA	manufacturing		
Subaru of America	Camden, NJ	automotive		
TD Bank, N.A.	Cherry Hill, NJ	financial		

== Divisions of US corporations ==
Name	City	Industry	Parent	Fortune 1000 rank (2014)	Notes
Acme Markets	Malvern, PA	retail	Albertsons	94	
Boeing Rotorcraft	Ridley Township, PA	aviation	Boeing	30	
Centocor	Malvern, PA	pharmaceuticals	Johnson & Johnson	39	
Colonial Penn	Philadelphia	insurance	Conseco		
Comcast Spectacor	Philadelphia	entertainment	Comcast		
Delmarva Power	Wilmington, DE	energy	Exelon	561	
GSI Commerce	King of Prussia, PA	retail	eBay		
Harrah's Philadelphia	Chester, PA	entertainment	Caesars Entertainment		
Janney Montgomery Scott	Philadelphia	investment	Penn Mutual		
Keystone Helicopter	Coatesville, PA	aviation	United Technologies	45	
Knoll	East Greenville, PA	furniture	Herman Miller		
MAB Paints	Broomall, PA	paint	Sherwin-Williams	278	
McNeil Consumer Healthcare	Fort Washington, PA	pharmaceuticals	Johnson & Johnson	36	
Mitchell & Ness	Philadelphia	apparel	Juggernaut Capital Partners		
Moody's Economy.com	West Chester, PA	economic research	Moody's Analytics		
PECO Energy	Philadelphia	energy	Exelon	119	
Pep Boys	Bala Cynwyd, PA	automotive	Icahn Enterprises	945	
Qurate Retail Group	West Chester, PA	retail	Liberty Media		
Rohm and Haas	Philadelphia	chemicals	Dow Chemical	48	
Sesame Place	Langhorne, PA	entertainment	SeaWorld Parks & Entertainment		
Tastykake	Philadelphia	food	Flowers Foods		
VWR International	Radnor, PA	scientific products	Avantor	583	

== Divisions of foreign corporations ==
Name	City	Industry	Parent	Notes
Ikon Office Solutions	Malvern, PA	office supplies	Ricoh	
Philly Shipyard	Philadelphia	shipbuilding	American Shipping Company	
Radial	King of Prussia, PA	retail	Bpost	

== Defunct corporations ==
Name	City	Industry	Fate	Notes
Actua Corporation	Wayne, PA	finance	failed	
American Line	Philadelphia	maritime	merged	amalgamated into IMM
AgustaWestland	Philadelphia	aviation	acquired	by Finmeccanica, today Leonardo; Headquartered in Rome, Italy
Baldwin Locomotive Works	Philadelphia and Eddystone, PA	manufacturing	failed	
Brand.com	Philadelphia	public relations	failed	
J. G. Brill Company	Philadelphia	railcars	merged	
Brown Bros. & Co.	Philadelphia	financial	merged	moved to NYC, now called Brown Brothers Harriman & Co.
Cephalon	West Chester, PA	pharmaceutical	acquired	by Teva Pharmaceuticals in Oct. 2011; small R&D presence still in original location
Chemtura	Philadelphia	manufacturing	acquired	by Lanxess
E.W. Clark & Co.	Philadelphia	financial	merged	Ultimately became part of Penn Mutual
Commodore International	West Chester, PA	electronics	failed	Office complex is now home to QVC.
Consolidated Rail Corporation	Philadelphia	railroad	split	into: Norfolk Southern Railway, CSX Transportation, Conrail Shared Assets Operations
Curtis Publishing Company	Philadelphia	publishing	assets sold	
Delaware Investments	Philadelphia	financial	acquired	by Macquarie Group
Drexel and Company	Philadelphia	financial	failed	Transformed several times, eventually failed as part of the 1980s junk bond fiasco.
Drinker Biddle & Reath	Philadelphia	law	merged	with Faegre Baker Daniels
EB Games	West Chester, PA	electronics and gaming	acquired	by GameStop
eGames	Langhorne, PA	electronics and gaming	failed	
Ensoniq	Malvern, PA	electronics	acquired	by Creative Labs, which dissolved the brand.
ePrivacy Group	Malvern, PA	software	acquired	by Symantec, which dissolved the brand.
Extreme Championship Wrestling	Philadelphia	entertainment	acquired	by World Wrestling Entertainment
Genuardi's	Norristown, PA	retail	acquired	by Safeway
Happy Harry's	Newark, DE	retail	acquired	by Walgreens
Hercules	Wilmington, DE	chemicals	acquired	by Ashland
International Mercantile Marine Co.	Philadelphia	maritime	failed	Owned the Titanic
J & W Van Duzen & Company	Philadelphia	shipbuilding	uncertain	Built the first marine railway in Philadelphia
Lanston Monotype Company	Philadelphia	printing	failed	successor company moved to Buffalo, NY
Loud Brothers	Philadelphia	manufacturing	failed	
Liberty Property Trust	Malvern, PA	real estate	acquired	by Prologis
MBNA	Wilmington, DE	financial	acquired	by Bank of America
Midvale Steel	Philadelphia	steelmaking; fabrication	merged	Name survives in Heppenstall-Midvale AG
MOS Technology	Norristown, PA	electronics	acquired	by Commodore, which failed
Muskogee Company	Philadelphia	mining	acquired	by Missouri Pacific Railroad
Neafie & Levy	Philadelphia	shipbuilding	failed	
Neoware	King of Prussia, PA	electronics	acquired	by Hewlett-Packard
Penn Central Transportation	Philadelphia	railroad	failed	most of it became SEPTA with merger of other railroads; parts are now Amtrak
Pennsylvania Railroad	Philadelphia	railroad	merged	with New York Central to become Penn Central.
Philadelphia Media Holdings	Philadelphia	newspapers	bankrupt	
Philadelphia National Bank	Philadelphia	financial	acquired	by Wachovia which was then acquired by Wells Fargo
Philco	Philadelphia	manufacturing	acquired	by Ford, moved to Lansdale, Blue Bell, and Willow Grove before moving to Michigan where part lives on as Visteon. Was renamed Ford Aerospace and sold to Loral in 1990. Another part of the original Philco International moved to Pittsburgh in 1988.
Philadelphia Savings Fund Society	Philadelphia	financial	failed	seized by the FDIC and sold to Mellon Financial
Reading Company	Philadelphia	railroad	failed	became SEPTA. A piece lives on as Reading Entertainment/Reading International, a real estate company.
Red Star Line	Philadelphia	maritime	merged	amalgamated into IMM.
Strawbridge's	Philadelphia	retail	acquired	restructured, renamed.
SunGard	Wayne, PA	information technology	acquired	by FIS
Synygy	Chester, PA	consulting and outsourcing	failed	
The Blum Store	Philadelphia	women’s clothing and accessories	failed	
ViroPharma	Exton, PA	pharmaceuticals	acquired	by Shire
Wanamaker's	Philadelphia	retail	acquired	restructured, renamed.
William Cramp & Sons	Philadelphia	maritime	failed	
William Sellers & Co.	Philadelphia	machine tools, industrial plant equipment	merged	
Wilmington Trust	Wilmington, DE	financial	acquired	
WolfBlock	Philadelphia	law	failed	
Wyeth	Collegeville, PA	pharmaceuticals	acquired	by Pfizer

== Corporations that moved to a different region ==
- Amkor Technology - moved from West Chester, Pennsylvania to Chandler, Arizona
- Bell Atlantic - after merger with NYNEX, headquarters moved from Philadelphia to New York City; a significant workforce remains in the area
- Breyers - acquired by Kraft Foods and then by Unilever
- Jones Apparel Group - moved to New York City
- Whitman's - now operated by Russell Stover; based in Colorado

== Less notable Philadelphia corporations ==
- Bassetts Ice Cream
- Burnt Toast Vinyl
- Campus Apartments
- Day's Beverages
- Yards Brewing Company
- Zivtech - software and web development
