= Postal codes in Belgium =

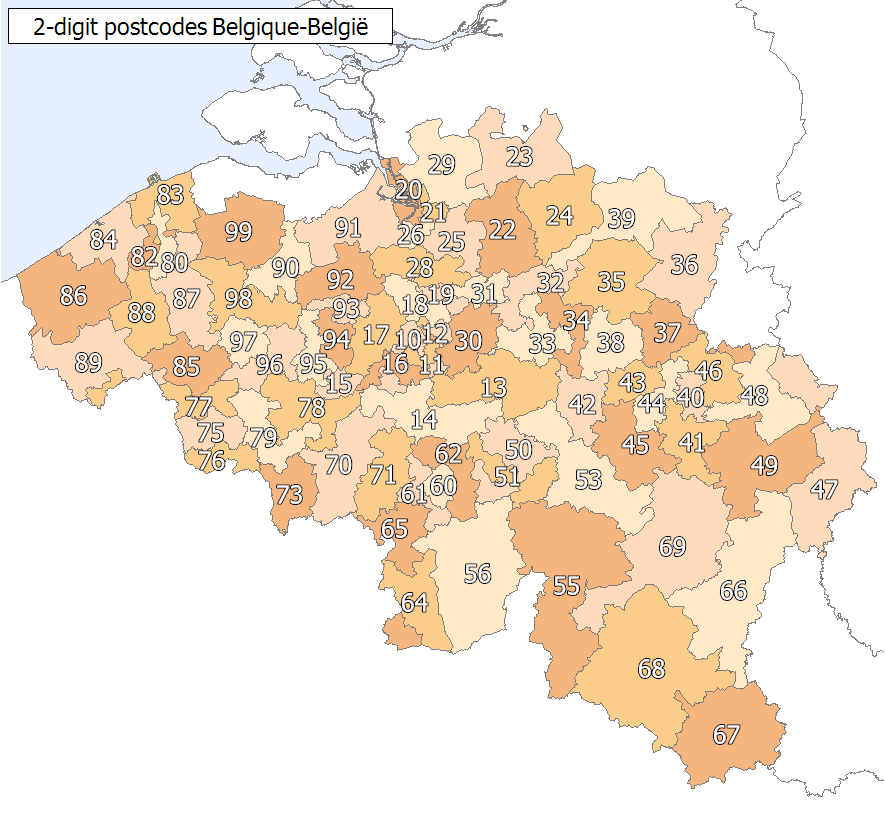
2-digit postcode areas Belgium (defined through the first two postcode digits)

Postal codes in Belgium are numeric and consist of 4 numbers. The first digit indicates the province (except for the 3xxx numbers that are shared by the eastern part of Flemish Brabant and Limburg, the 6xxx that are shared between the Hainaut and Luxembourg province, and the 1xxx that are shared by the Brussels Capital Region, the western part of Flemish Brabant and Walloon Brabant). The more zeros there are, the higher the number of inhabitants of that city in the province. For example: Bruges (Brugge) is the capital and largest urban centre of the coastal province of West Flanders so it gets the 8000 code, the second city is Kortrijk and gets 8500. When writing the address, the postal code is put in front of the town name.

Special numbers are reserved for the EU institutions, NATO headquarters, public and commercial broadcasters (RTBF, RTL TVI, VRT and VTM), the different parliaments and other public institutions.

A correct Belgian postal code is mentioned before the address' municipality or section (e.g.: "8500 Kortrijk"). While often used erroneously, Bpost's guidelines specifically implore not to mention any country code in front of the postal code (e.g.: "B-8500" instead of "8500"), similarly to the Universal Postal Union's S42 definition of an address.

The current 4 digit numeric postal code system has been in place since 1969.
