= Broadcast Music, Inc. =

Performing rights organization in the United States

- Trade name: BMI (1939–present)
- Type: Subsidiary
- Industry: Music
- Founded: 1939
- Headquarters: New York City, U.S.
- Area served: Worldwide
- Key people: Michael O'Neill (President & CEO)
- Products: Music performance blanket licenses
- Services: Distributing performance royalties
- Parent: New Mountain Capital
- Website: bmi.com

Broadcast Music, Inc. (BMI) is a performance rights organization in the United States. It collects blanket license fees from businesses that use music, entitling those businesses to play or sync any songs from BMI's repertoire of over 22.4 million musical works. On a quarterly basis, BMI distributes the money to songwriters, composers, and music publishers as royalties to those members whose works have been performed.

In FY 2022, BMI collected $1.573 billion in revenues and distributed $1.471 billion in royalties. BMI's repertoire includes over 1.4 million songwriters and 22.4 million compositions. BMI is the biggest performing rights organization in the United States and is one of the largest such organizations in the world.

BMI songwriters create music in virtually every genre. BMI represents artists such as Patti LaBelle, Selena, Miley Cyrus, Lil Wayne, Lil Nas X, Birdman, Lady Gaga, Taylor Swift, Eminem, Rihanna, Shakira, Doja Cat, Megan Thee Stallion, Ed Sheeran, Karol G, J Balvin, Sam Cooke, Michael Jackson, Willie Nelson, Fats Domino and Dolly Parton; bands such as Evanescence, Red Hot Chili Peppers, Linkin Park, Twenty One Pilots and Fifth Harmony; and composers such as Harry Gregson-Williams, John Williams, Danny Elfman, Hildur Guðnadóttir, Ludwig Göransson, and the Sherman Brothers.

In 1961, BMI co-founded the BMI Lehman Engel Musical Theater Workshop, which fosters new musical theater writing talent. Notable alumni have included Alan Menken, Maury Yeston, Robert Lopez, Jeanine Tesori, and the songwriting team of Lynn Ahrens and Stephen Flaherty. In recognition of its contributions to musical theater, the BMI Lehman Engel Musical Theatre Workshop has won both a Tony Award and a Drama Desk Award.

== History ==
In the 1930s, radio was coming to prominence as a source of musical entertainment that threatened to weaken record sales and opportunities for "live" acts. The Great Depression was already draining artist revenues from recordings and live performances. ASCAP, the pre-eminent royalty/licensing agency for more than two decades, required radio stations to subscribe to "blanket" licenses granting ASCAP a fixed percentage of each station's revenue, regardless of how much music the station played from ASCAP's repertoire. In 1939, ASCAP announced a substantial increase in the revenue share licensees would be required to pay. BMI was founded by the National Association of Broadcasters to provide a lower-cost alternative to ASCAP. As such, BMI created competition in the field of performing rights, providing an alternative source of licensing for all music users.

The vast majority of U.S. radio stations, and all three radio networks, refused to renew their ASCAP licenses for 1941, choosing to forgo playing ASCAP music entirely and rely on the BMI repertoire. In February 1941, similar to the agreement it had made with ASCAP, the Department of Justice and BMI entered into a consent decree, requiring certain changes to BMI's business model, including giving licensees the option of paying only for the music they actually used instead of buying a blanket license. The U.S. District Court in Milwaukee was chosen by the Justice Department to supervise the decree for both BMI and ASCAP.

Competing against the strongly established ASCAP, BMI sought out artists that ASCAP tended to overlook or ignore. BMI also purchased the rights to numerous catalogs held by independent publishers or whose ASCAP contracts were about to expire. To attract newer writers, BMI proposed to compensate songwriters and publishers on the basis of a fixed fee per performance, as opposed to ASCAP's two-tier system, which discriminated against less-established songwriters. Despite its original motivation regarding radio station royalties and its focus on radio station revenues versus artist revenues, BMI became the first performing rights organization in the United States to represent songwriters of blues, jazz, rhythm and blues, gospel (black genres, performers, and writers that ASCAP did not want to represent), country, folk, Latin, and—ultimately—rock and roll. During the 1940s and 1950s, BMI was the primary licensing organization for country artists and R&B artists, while ASCAP centered on more established Pop artists. Also during that time, BMI expanded its repertoire of classical music, and now represents the majority of the members of the prestigious American Academy of Arts and Letters and the winners of 31 Pulitzer Prizes for Music.

BMI's practice of selling only "blanket licenses", rather than licenses for individual songs, led to a major antitrust law dispute between BMI and CBS, that resulted in the 1979 case, Broadcast Music, Inc. v. CBS, Inc., in which the U.S. Supreme Court held that the prohibition of "price fixing" by the Sherman Act was not strictly literal, and should be interpreted in light of the economic efficiencies an agreement brings.

In July 2017, BMI renewed long-term partnership with C3 Presents, the world's largest music festival producer.

In October 2022, BMI announced that it would transition from its historical not-for-profit structure to a for-profit model in order to invest in growth and technology modernization. It agreed to be acquired by an investor group led by New Mountain Capital in November 2023, and the deal closed on February 8, 2024.

== Business ==
BMI issues licenses to users of music, including:

- Television and radio stations
- Websites
- Digital services providers (DSPs)
- Broadcast and cable networks
- The internet and mobile technologies
- Satellite radio services such as SiriusXM
- Nightclubs, hotels, bars, restaurants, breweries
- Symphony orchestras, concert bands, and classical chamber music ensembles
- Digital jukeboxes
- Colleges
- Fitness facilities
- Live concerts

BMI tracks public performances from among a repertoire of more than 22.4 million musical works. BMI collects blanket fees from users of music such as radio stations, TV stations, and live venues. After deducting its operating expenses off the top, on a quarterly basis BMI distributes the money as Performance Royalties to its member songwriters, composers, and music publishers, according to a royalty calculation formula. BMI has offices in Atlanta, London, Los Angeles, Nashville, New York, Austin, and Washington, D.C..

== Awards ==
BMI annually hosts award shows that honor the songwriters, composers and music publishers of the year's most-performed songs in the BMI catalog. BMI Award shows include the BMI Latin Awards, BMI Pop Awards, BMI Film & TV Awards, BMI R&B/Hip-Hop Awards, BMI London Awards, BMI Country Awards, BMI Christian Awards, and the BMI Trailblazers of Gospel Music Awards.

== See also ==
- CISAC
- ASCAP
- BMI Foundation
- BMI Lehman Engel Musical Theatre Workshop
- Copyright collective
- Recording Academy
- David Sanjek
- Ottalie Mark
