= Signify Health =

Healthcare services company

Signify Health is a healthcare services company.

It provides technology to assist health plans and providers with in-home care.

It was founded in 2017 from the merger of Advance Health and CenseoHealth by private equity firm New Mountain Capital.

In July 2022, it announced that it was leaving the bundled health insurance payments business. It estimated that the decision would cost up to $35 million in severance and other employee costs.

In August 2022, the company announced it was exploring a sale. Amazon was one of the bidders. In September 2022, CVS Health announced that it was acquiring Signify Health for $8 billion.
