= Mennonite Heritage Center =

- Location within Pennsylvania Location within the United States
- Location: 565 Yoder Road, Harleysville, PA, 19438
- Coordinates: 40.2904989°N 75.3823447°W
- Executive director: Sarah Wolfgang Heffner
- Website: mhep.org

The Mennonite Heritage Center is a museum, library and exhibition space in Harleysville, Pennsylvania, United States, 32 miles (51 km) northwest of Philadelphia, about the Mennonites of Eastern Pennsylvania.

== Examples of exhibits ==
From April 2017 through March 2018 the exhibit "Opportunity & Conscience: Mennonite Immigration to Pennsylvania" runs, which includes:

- a recreation of an immigrant ship during the late 1600s and early 1700s, in which Mennonites emigrated from Europe
- a recreated sitting room in an early immigrant home
- interview with or writings by recent immigrants

There is a semi-permanent exhibit "Work and Hope: Mennonite Life in Eastern Pennsylvania", which uses images and artifacts to illustrate three centuries of Mennonite life in the region.

The center has a gallery of Fraktur.

In 2015 the Center celebrated its 40th anniversary with a "hymnal series", that is, groups singing hymns of historical significance to the Mennonite community.

Gallery

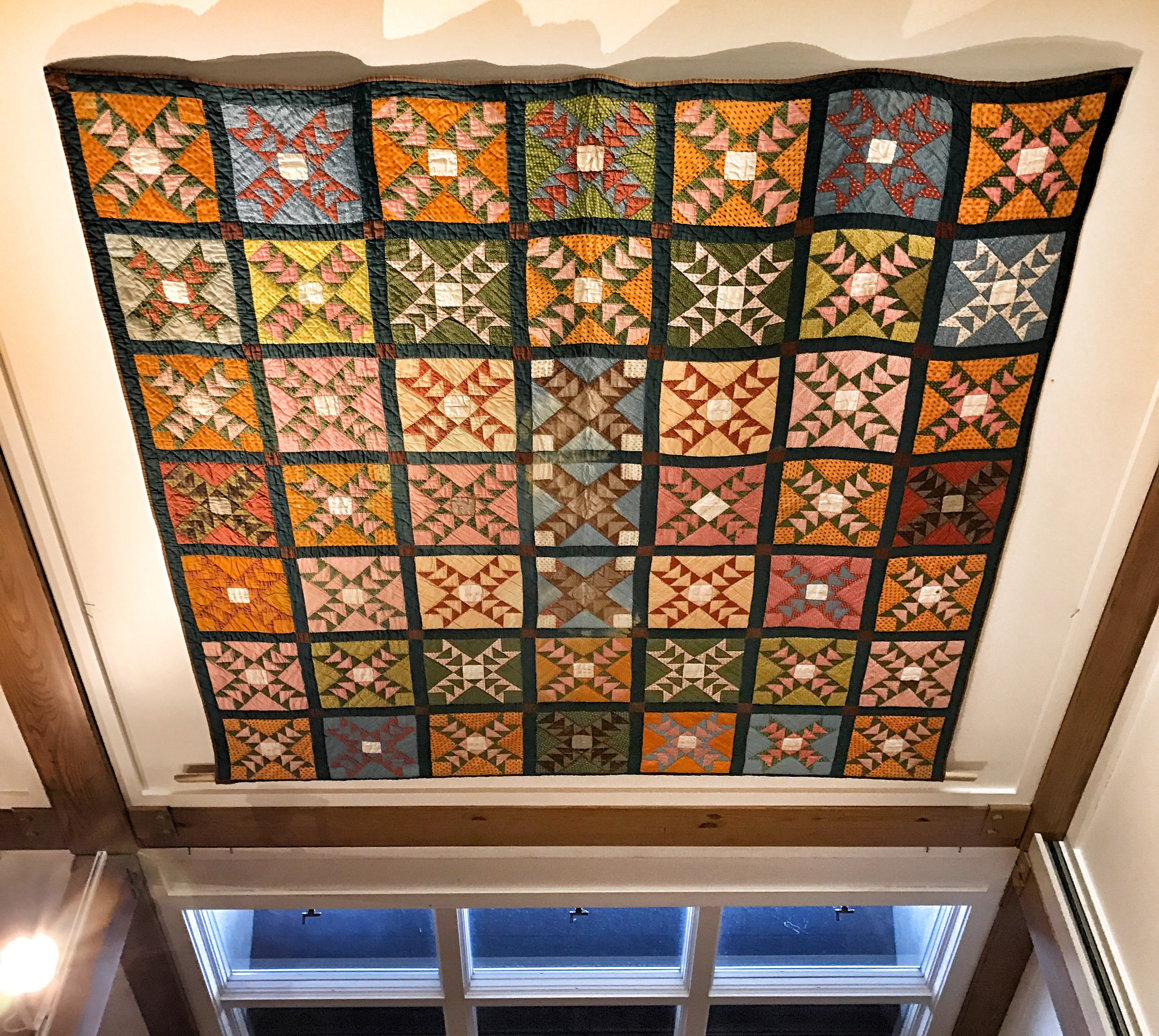
A quilt

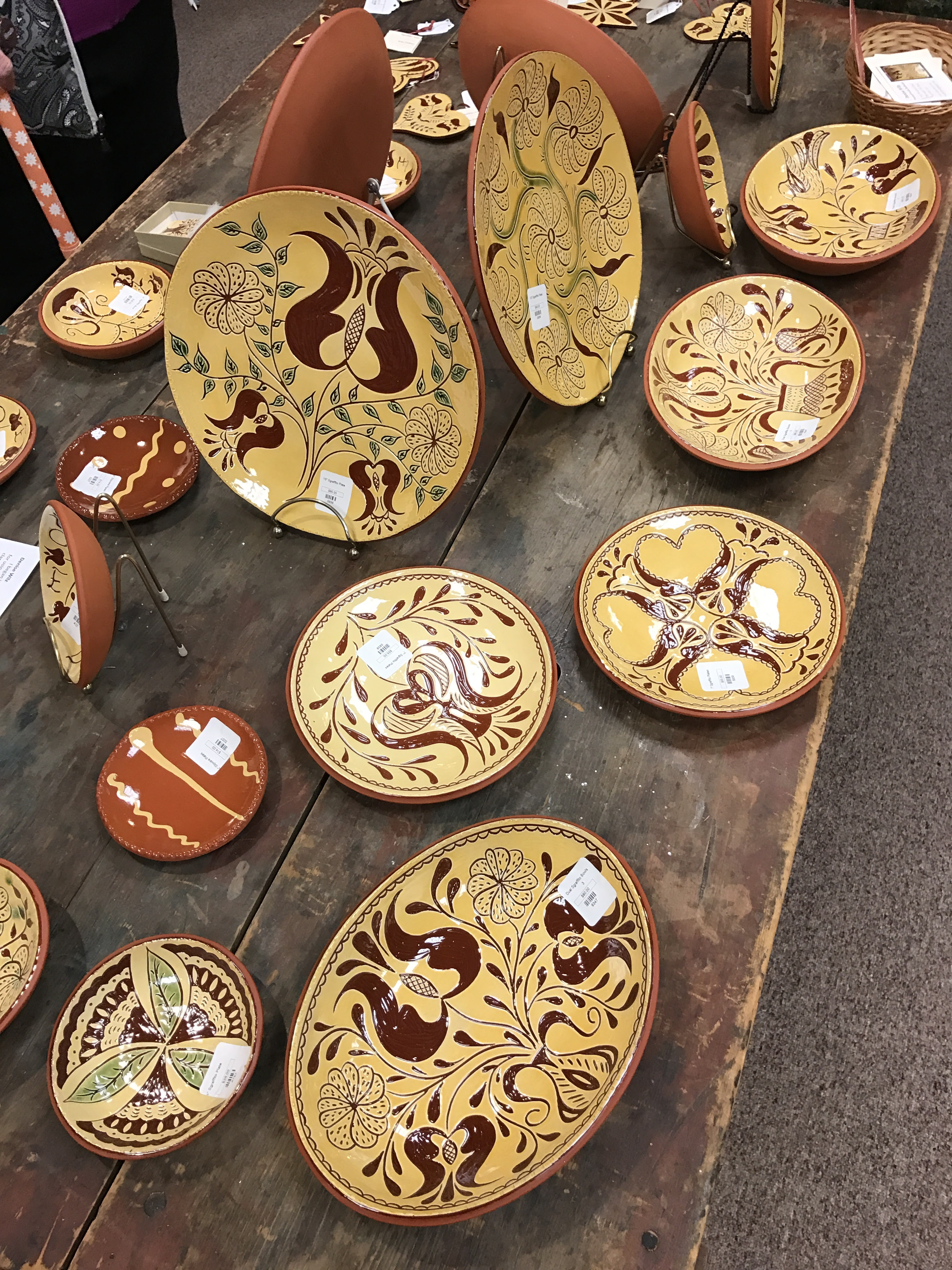
Redware pottery

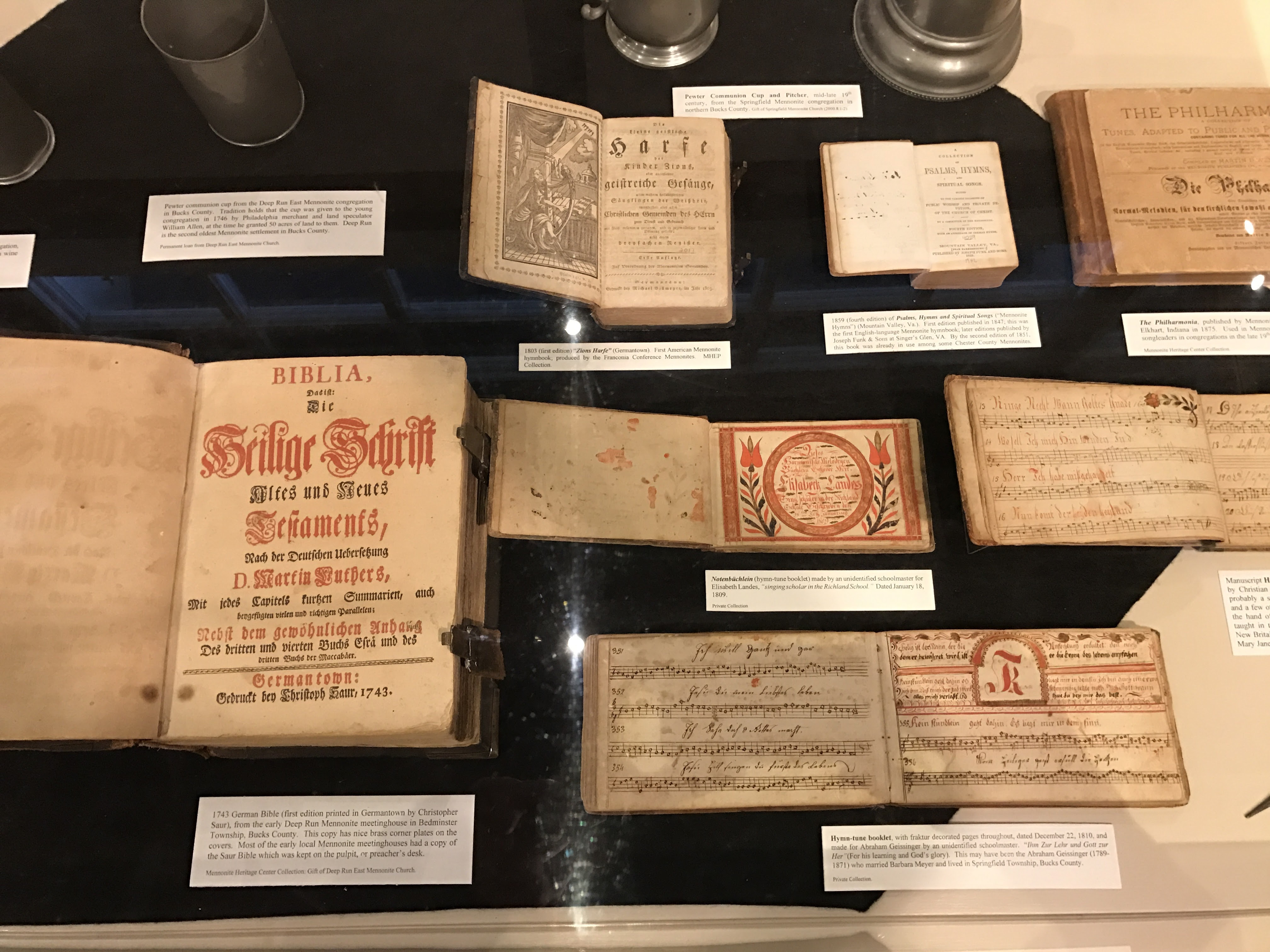
Bibles and hymnals

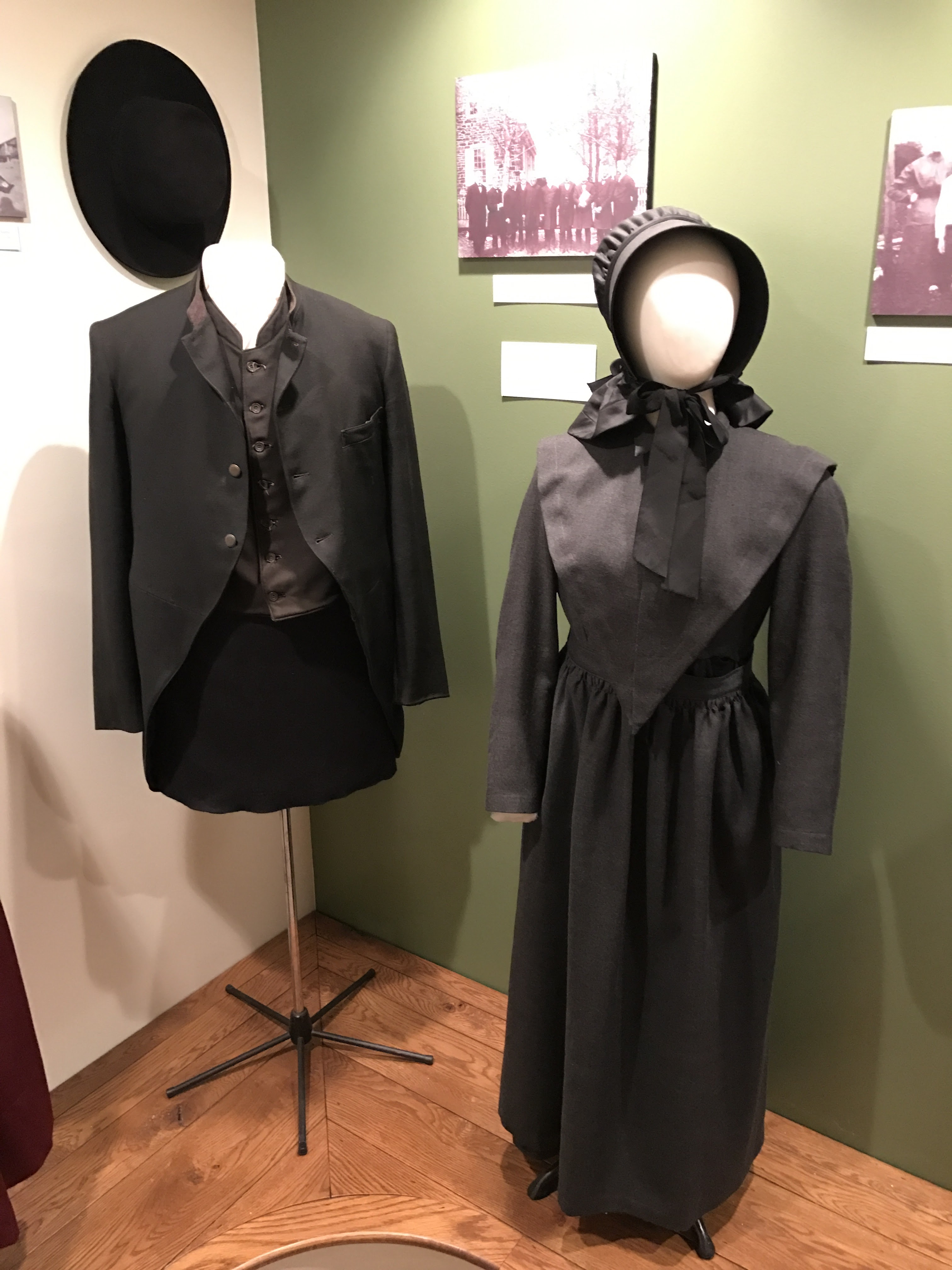
Historic clothing

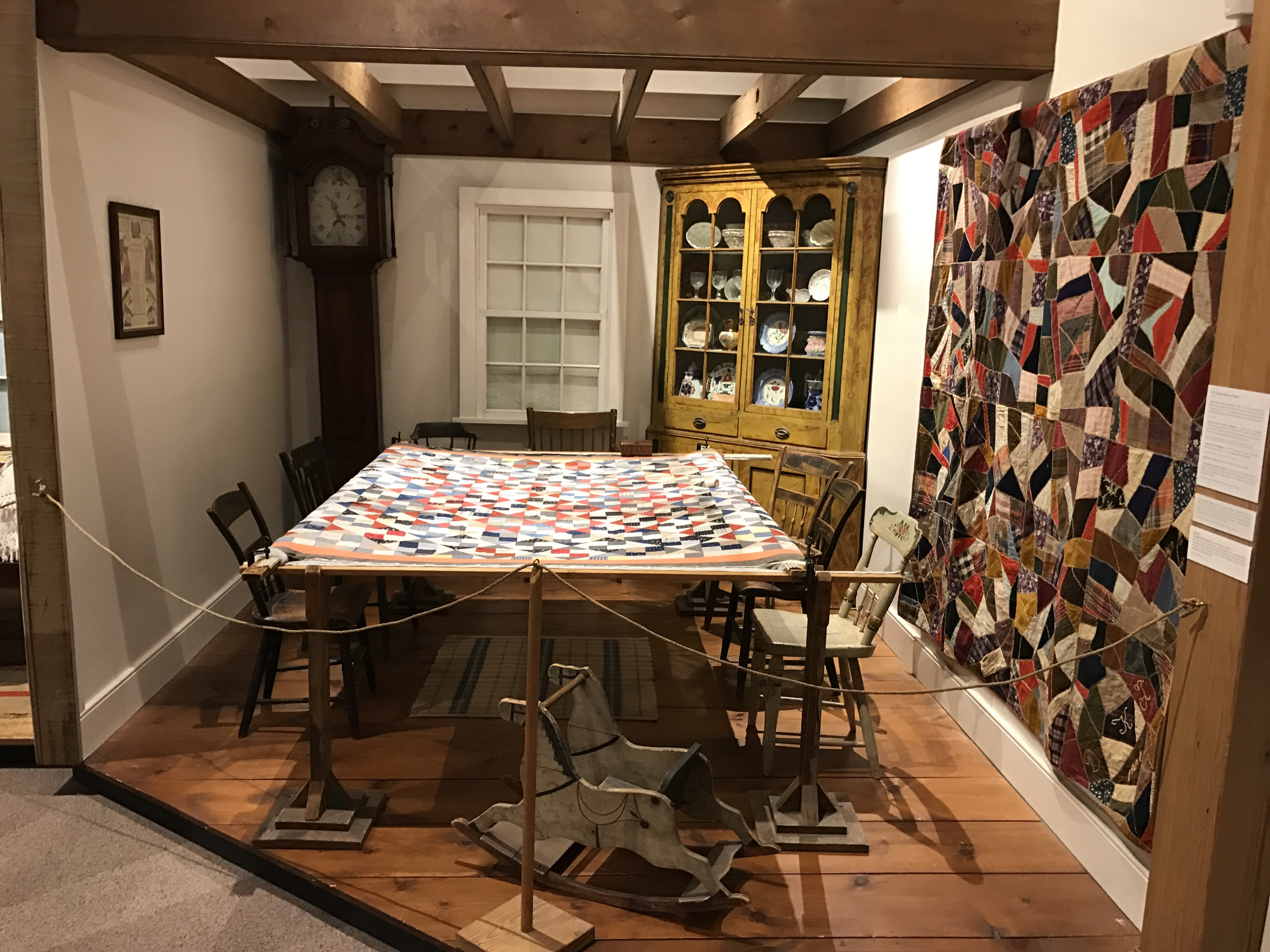
A model of interior of a house

== Events ==
Annual events include the Apple Butter Frolic autumn festival in October, the "Christmas Feast" show and craft and food sale, and a Used Book Sale.

== Other facilities ==
There is a museum store selling framed Fraktur prints, Redware pottery, other stoneware pottery, textiles, CDs, notecards, cookbooks, genealogies, books and DVDs about Mennonites, local history and culture, etc.

Beginning in 2012 the Center renovated a 3,200-square-foot traditional barn, the Paul M. Nyce Barn, which it rents for events such as wedding receptions. The Center maintains a blog on its website with histories of local families descended from Mennonite immigrants.

== Official website ==
- Mennonite Heritage Center
