= Klein Meetinghouse =

Historic church in Pennsylvania, United States

- U.S. National Register of Historic Places
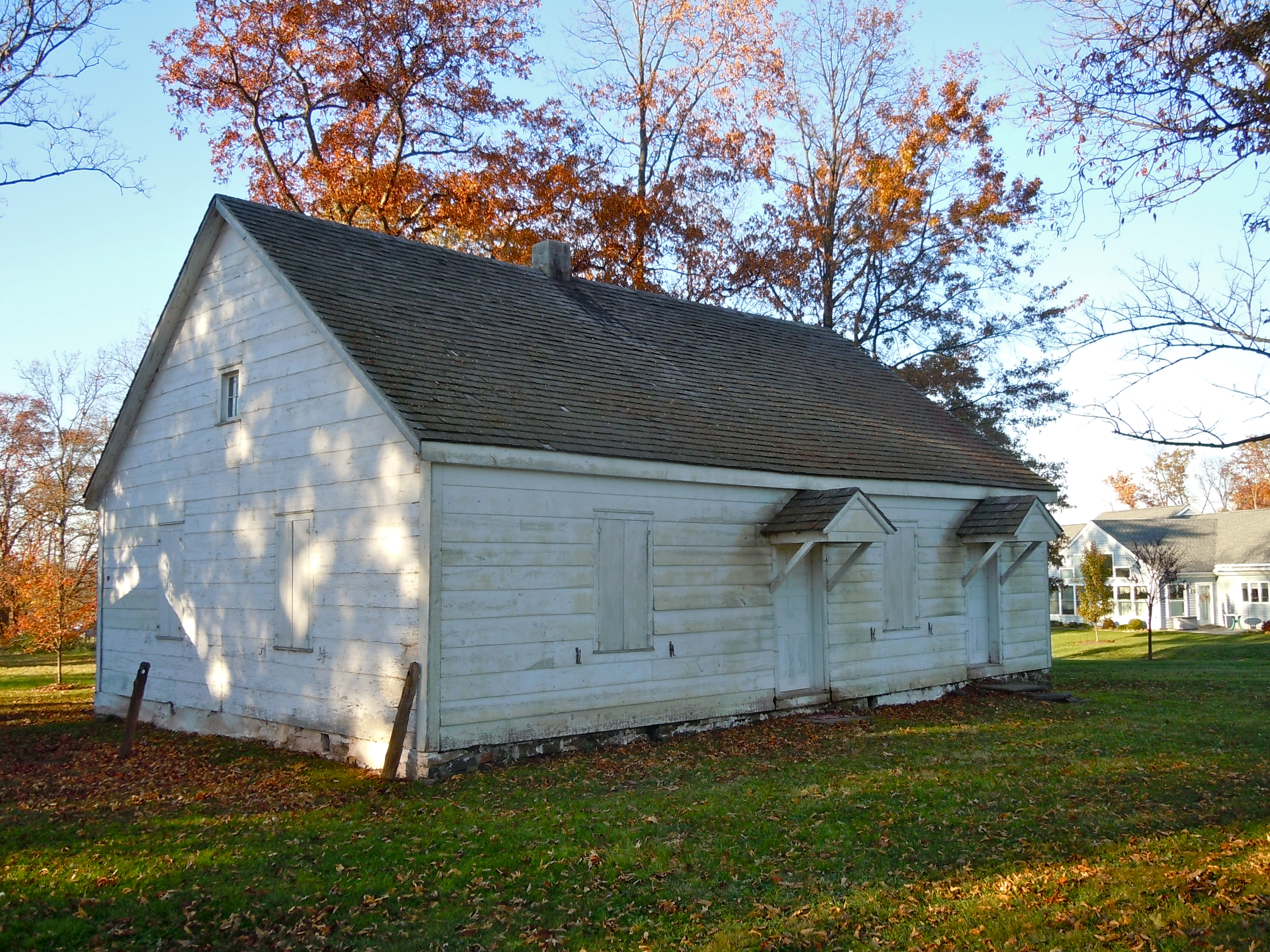
- Klein Meetinghouse, November 2011

- Location within Pennsylvania Location within the United States
- Location: Maple Ave., Harleysville, Pennsylvania
- Coordinates: 40°17′31″N 75°22′34″W
- Area: 2 acres (0.81 ha)
- Built: 1843
- NRHP reference No.: 73001645
- Added to NRHP: April 13, 1973

The Klein Meetinghouse is an historic Dunkard (Schwarzenau Brethren or Church of the Brethren) meetinghouse that is located in Harleysville, Pennsylvania. Built in 1843, it is the second oldest congregation of the Brethren in the United States, and was established in this area in 1720 when Peter Becker, who led the Brethren to America in 1714, built this meetinghouse. The adjoining cemetery contains Becker's remains.

== History and architectural features ==
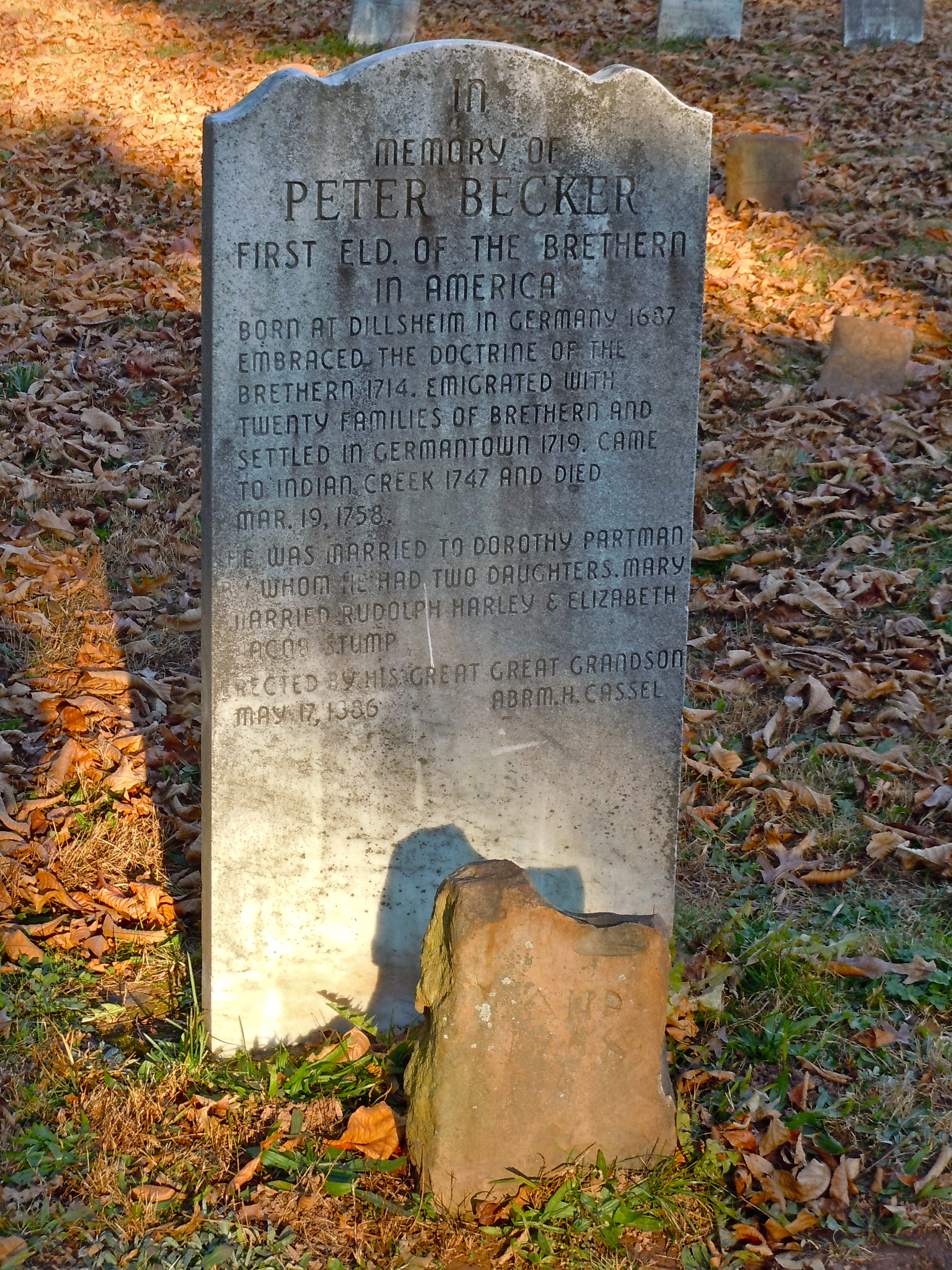
Gravestones of Peter Becker, the larger of which was placed in 1886

This meetinghouse reflects the belief in simplicity held by the Brethren and similar Pietist and Anabaptist churches in early America. The building is a single-story, wood-framed structure with a shingled roof. Two doorways lead inside, the central doorway for the men, and a second doorway for the women to the right. The interior is equally simple and is without an altar, lectern, pulpit, candle, or stained glass. A central post is similar to those in other Anabaptist meetinghouses of the period. The central piece of furniture is the Liebsmaltisch, or Love Feast Table, which is used for the Lovefeast on Maundy Thursday.

The historic site is located on Maple Avenue in Harleysville, next to the Indian Valley YMCA.

== See also ==
- National Register of Historic Places listings in Montgomery County, Pennsylvania
- Colonial Germantown Historic District – location of the first Dunkard meetinghouse in America
