= Day's Beverages =

American beverage company

Day's Beverages Inc. is a privately held manufacturer of private label soft drinks based in Newtown Square, Pennsylvania. The company was originally established in 1946 by Alfred "Freddy-Day" DiGirolamo in South Philadelphia and operated for 20 years. The company was re-established in 1996 by his sons David and Fred Jr. and makes several low cost sodas including non-traditional fruit flavors.

According to legend...

...Freddy Day, was caught stealing a case of soda off of a delivery truck. Given the choice of either being reported to the police or assisting the delivery driver for the day, Freddy Day chose to assist the driver and there was when he found his calling. Several years later, The Day's Beverage Company was formed and their soda was manufactured and distributed throughout the Philadelphia area for the next twenty years until his death.

The company currently distributes beverages to 14 different states in sizes from 8 oz cans to 3 liter bottles and claims to be the largest private label soda bottler in the eastern US.
