= ACI Technologies =

Scientific research corporation in Philadelphia, Pennsylvania

Coordinates: 39°52′28.22″N 75°15′31.12″W

ACI Technologies, Inc.
- Formerly: American Competitiveness Institute
- Type: Nonprofit corporation
- Industry: Electronics manufacturing services
- Founded: 1992
- Founder: Alan J. Criswell
- Headquarters: Philadelphia, Pennsylvania, United States
- Website: www.aciusa.org

ACI Technologies Inc. (ACI), formerly known as the American Competitiveness Institute, is an American scientific research corporation founded by Alan J. Criswell in 1992. Located in Philadelphia, Pennsylvania, ACI operates a 10,000-square-foot (930 m^{2}) facility dedicated to the advancement of the electronics industry and research and development of various electronic manufacturing methods and materials. Early in its existence, ACI acquired a defense contract from the Office of Naval Research known as the Electronics Manufacturing Productivity Facility (EMPF).
