= League Collegiate Wear =

American apparel company

League Collegiate Wear, Inc.
- Company type: Private
- Industry: College apparel
- Founded: 1990
- Defunct: 2018
- Successor: L2 Brands
- Headquarters: Bridgeport Business Park · 401 East Fourth Street Building #8; Bridgeport, Pennsylvania
- Key people: Drew Wolf; (Founder); Larry Klebanoff; (Co-Founder)
- Products: Apparel
- Website: League Collegiate Wear

League Collegiate Wear, Inc. was a college apparel company which sells university-licensed sportswear in the college bookstore market to over 3000 colleges and universities. In addition, it produces apparel for sales teams and sponsored events. It was founded in 1990 in Bridgeport, Pennsylvania.

In 2018 League Collegiate Wear merged with Legacy Athletics and became L2 brands.
