= Harleysville Group =

Publicly traded insurance company based in Harleysville, Pennsylvania

Harleysville Group Inc.
- Type: Subsidiary
- Traded as: Nasdaq: HGIC
- Industry: Insurance
- Founded: 1912; 114 years ago, in Harleysville, Pennsylvania, United States
- Key people: Michael L. Browne (CEO)
- Services: Property and Casualty Insurance
- Revenue: $986.3 million
- Number of employees: 1,713 (2009)
- Parent: Nationwide Mutual Insurance Company
- Website: www.harleysvillegroup.com

Harleysville Group Inc. is an insurance company based in Harleysville, Pennsylvania. It writes predominantly commercial insurances policies constituting more than 80% of premium volume received by the corporation per annum.

== History ==
Harleysville was started by Alvin C. Alderfer because he and many automobile owners had no way of insuring against the risk of theft. Within two years he received an order from the state of Pennsylvania's Department of Insurance that he had to either disband the association or charter it according to the states regulations. On October 9, 1917 the Mutual Auto Theft Insurance Company and the Mutual Auto Fire Insurance Company were chartered.

In 1922 after changes in state regulations and increased business by automobile owners the Harleysville Mutual Casualty Company was formed.

In 1933 they merged with the Auto Theft Company. Over the coming years the company made strives to predict market trends and to keep ahead of those trends.

In 1956 it changed its name again to Harleysville Mutual Insurance Company. It opened up Harleysville Life Insurance Company in 1960 which wrote life and disability insurance along with offering retirement plans.

In 1966 the company went through major restructuring with all of the companies coming under Harleysville Mutual. During the next decade and a half the company progressively wrote more commercial volume as opposed to the emphasis on personal lines that it had seen up to that point. This culminated in the addition of a number of subsidiaries to keep up with the changes to the insurance industry that happened during that time.

In 1979 Harleysville Group Inc. was founded.

In 1982 the company purchased McAlear Associates which was an excess and surplus brokerage firm, along with Huron Insurance Company. Followed the next year by the acquisition of The Worcester Insurance Company. These acquisitions set the stage for the company to expand to further territories. To fund this the company went public issuing 2,156,250 shares during its initial public offering.

In 1987 they acquired Atlantic Insurance Company of Savannah.

In 1990 they reached an agreement to manage the operations of Berkshire Mutual Insurance Group.

In 1991 they acquired Connecticut Union Insurance Company and New York Casualty Insurance Company.

In 1992, after Hurricane Andrew hit, they saw 91% of their claims being on homeowners policies. That influenced them to move much of their exposure away from homeowners policies, resulting in only 35% of claims being on homeowners policies after hurricane Floyd.

In 1993 they acquired Lake States Insurance Company and in 1994 formed Great Oaks Insurance Company in Ohio.

They acquired Minnesota Fire & Casualty Company in 1997.

In 1999 after seeing their stock price go down far enough the company repurchased 1 million outstanding shares as a show of financial stability to investors. To have a more unified public face the company brought all of its subsidiaries under the Harleysville name. At the same time they made significant investments in their information technology infrastructure.

On September 29, 2011 Nationwide Mutual Insurance Company announced its intentions to merge with Harleysville. As part of this deal the company would operate as a full owned subsidiary of Nationwide. It was announced that it would maintain autonomy from the proposed parent company.

The merger was successfully completed on May 1, 2012.
