= Loud Brothers =

American piano designer and manufacturer

- Type: family business
- Industry: manufacturing
- Founded: 1822
- Founder: Thomas Loud, Jr.
- Defunct: 1837
- Successor: Loud & Company
- Headquarters: Philadelphia, Pennsylvania, U.S.
- Key people: Thomas Loud, Jr.; Philologus Loud; John Loud; Joseph Loud
- Products: pianos

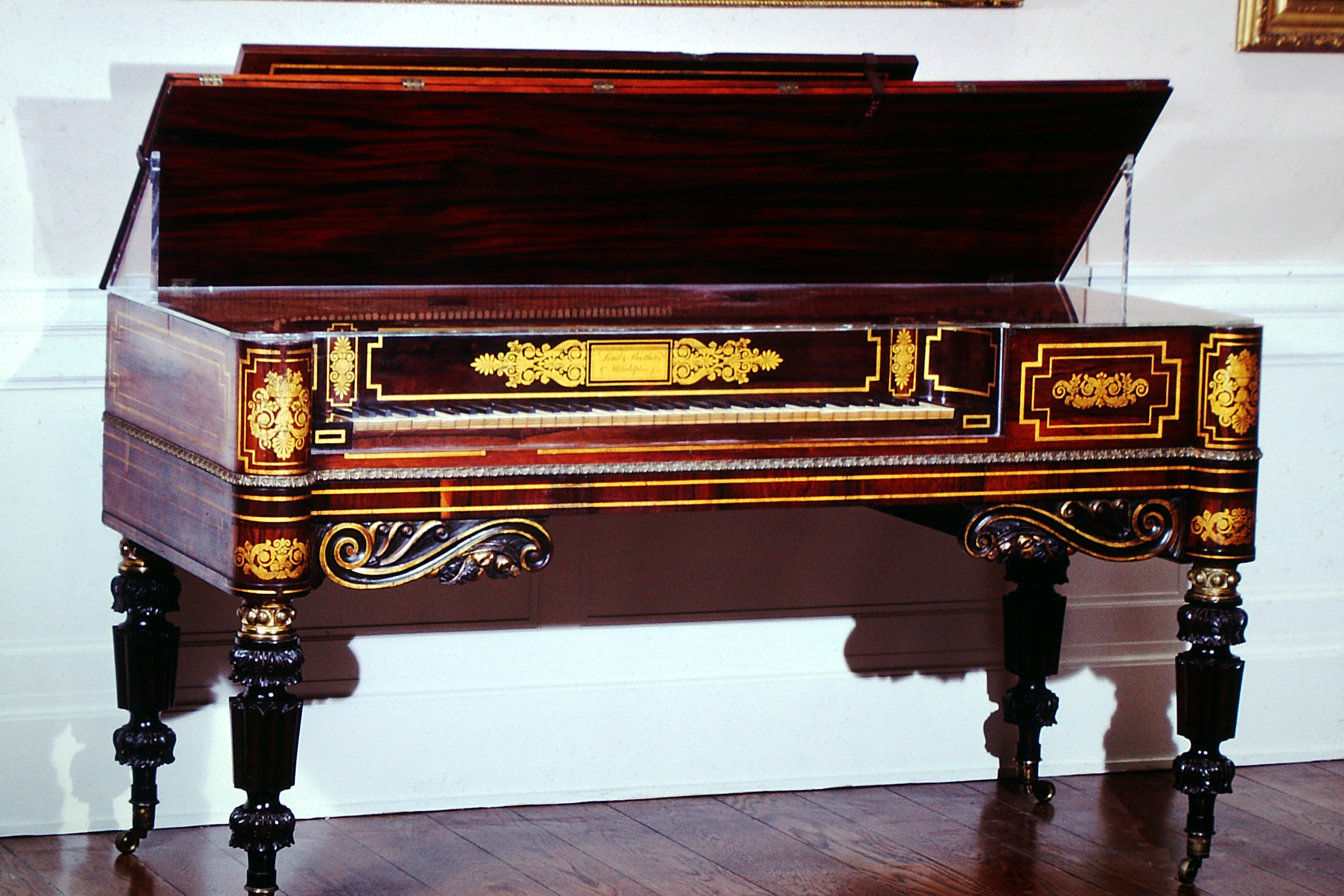

Loud Brothers was an American piano designer and manufacturer based in Philadelphia. Established in 1822, it was the leading American piano manufacturer till 1837, when the factory closed due to overproduction, market flooding, and plummeting sales. Four brothers, Thomas Loud, Jr., Philologus Loud, John Loud, and Joseph Loud, were involved with the company. Thomas C. Loud, son of Thomas Loud, Jr., upheld the family reputation till about 1855. The Louds, besides being strong inventors, were important promoters of the industry.

== Early history ==
In 1802, Thomas Loud, Sr. of London, was the first known pianoforte-maker to originate overstringing. He produced an upright that, according to the specification of his patent on this instrument, was the real precursor in build and general characteristics of the perfected instrument of the late 19th century, but it was not known if Loud ever carried out his plans to a logical issue in London. He emigrated to New York City as early as 1816. In 1822, he had a small repairing and making shop, at 102 Canal Street, which he occupied for several years, but moved to Walker Street in 1828, and later, between 1831 and 1833, he was on Broadway near Grand Street. In order to emphasize his national origin as a piano-maker, Loud had over his store the sign, "Thomas Loud, pianoforte-maker from London". Other old pioneer piano-makers of New York remembered Loud distinctly on this account, but he was never known to any of them as a maker of significance. Thomas Loud, Sr. died in February 1834, at 52 Vandam Street.

Thomas Loud, Sr. had at least four sons, Thomas Loud, Jr., Philologus, John, and Joseph. Thomas Loud, Jr. must have been in Philadelphia as early as 1811. Whether the brothers came over from London separately or collectively before 1824 is not clear.

== 1810s ==
Thomas Loud, Jr., was in business in Philadelphia as early as 1816. In 1817, he was located at Prune and Fifth streets. In 1818, he took his brother into partnership and moved to 361 High Street, later Market Street, where they carried on business as "Thomas & John Loud".

== 1820s ==
In 1822, the brother, Philologus, was taken into partnership, whereupon the name of "Loud Brothers" appeared for the first time. Loud Brothers, in 1824, were the most extensive makers of pianos in the U.S. In this single year, they claimed to have made 680 instruments, which was a large output for such a comparatively remote period, particularly when the use of pianos was limited almost to the very wealthy classes.

In 1825, Loud Brothers were well represented at the second exhibition of the Franklin Institute. They were outclassed in one direction by Alpheus Babcock, of Boston, to whom the premium for the best square was awarded, but carried off the premium for the best upright piano. The “Committee on Premiums" set forth a description of Loud Brothers' instrument in this manner: "Premium No. 46-to the manufacturer of the best upright or cabinet piano—is awarded to Loud Brothers for specimen No. 172, being an upright pianoforte of rosewood, which is considered a masterpiece of these excellent artists. It is finished in the best style, has a fine full tone and a very good touch; it is, moreover, a beautiful piece of furniture and decidedly entitles the makers to the silver medal, being the best of the four upright pianos exhibited." In the "Judges' Report" of this event, besides giving the same views in relation to the upright selected for the premium, they expressed the following opinion upon another upright exhibited by Loud Brothers, as subjoined: “The mahogany upright by the same makers is not of so high a class as the preceding, and is not exhibited with the same pretensions. Its tone is not so equal, although resembling the former in quality. Its touch is also inferior, yet it deserves the character of an excellent instrument."

The Louds were progressive in their methods. In 1826, they won particular notoriety owing to a grand piano they made for an eccentric Louisiana planter named Gordon. Gordon had worked as a driver, but came into money unexpectedly. He became anxious to outdo all his Southern neighbors, whom he felt were too proud to acknowledge him as an equal on account of his former occupation. He built a mansion and began to throw ostentatious social gatherings, which required a custom-made grand piano. The Louds, in line with Gordon's flamboyant style, produced a piano with a 7.5 octave range, the most extensive range ever reached till that point, though it was reportedly worthless from a musical perspective.

On May 15, 1827, Thomas Loud Jr. patented an early down-striking action. Despite being a novel development in action design at the time, it never achieved commercial success.

== 1830s ==
In 1835, he took out a patent for a cast metal plate, with compensating tubes, after the manner of Thoms & Allen's plate for grands, patented previously in London, with the difference that Loud's tubes were supposed to rest in sockets cast in the frame, which was produced in two entire castings, unlike Babcock's plate. This frame, however, was only a mere strip of cast-iron adjusted with small screws in the woodwork, outside the hitch-pin section, and this was a copy of Babcock's scheme. On December 7, 1837, Loud patented a further extension of this plate idea, illustrated in two figures given elsewhere. In the same patent, he published two square actions, which were a compromise theoretically between the common English and French actions, with special methods of adjusting the play of the jack underneath the hammer-heels in each design, as exemplified in the drawings given. The actions have neither hoppers nor rockers, and the manner of regulating “escapement in each is also original to an extent, as the plates indicate. The actions never survived, but Loud's compensating tubes” were generally adopted in New York in 1838, applied by various makers in such a manner as to defeat the object of Loud's patent. Albany shortly followed suit.

Various arrangements of this idea may be met with in old instruments of the period, in which tubes are applied in different ways, but invariably always so as to permit the strings to rest on a wooden back-bridge, because there was a general distrust of metal manifested. In Nunns & Clark's squares of 1838, for instance, one end of the large compensating tube rests in a socket cast in the hitch-pin plate, runs across from end to end, skirting the lowest bass strings, and rests in another socket, which is adjusted to the woodwork of the case. This became the accepted system of bracing after 1840 in most manufacturing centres, until the more general adoption of the whole metal plate in recent years.

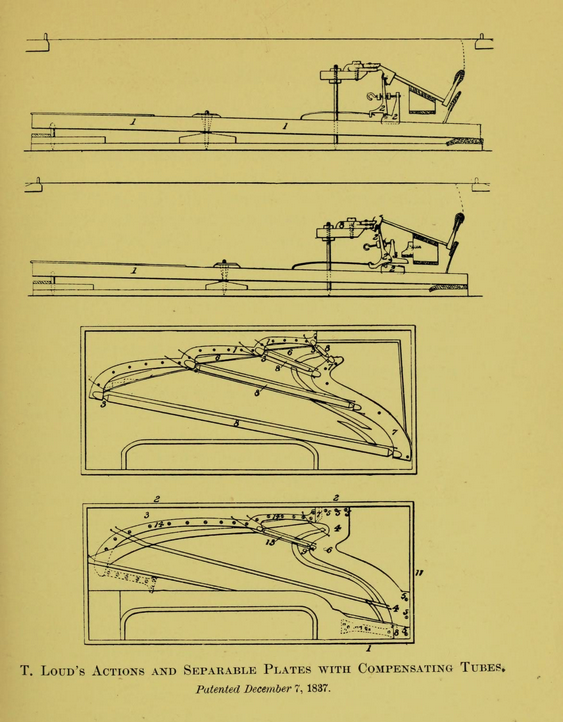
T. Loud's Actions and Separable Plates with Compensating Tubes, Patented December 7, 1837.

The Loud brothers were in business at 306 Chestnut Street in 1837. In this year, they met with a reverse in fortune and suspended manufacturing.

Mr. W. Whitelock, a member of the Maryland Historical Society, who knew the Loud brothers intimately, wrote:— "When I first knew them, in 1831, the firm was 'Loud Brothers', and was composed of the sons of the emigrant Loud referred to. They were Thomas, Philologus, John, and Joseph. They were induced to purchase a gold mine in North Carolina and failed in consequence. Thomas subsequently engaged in business with his son Thomas C. (born in Philadelphia, July 12, 1812). Philologus removed to Macon, Georgia, and subsequently died in Albany, Georgia. John was the husband of Marguerite St. Leon Loud, an authoress of some repute. Joseph migrated to California, and returning, died in Philadelphia, 1889, leaving a son. A sister of Joseph married Dr. T. T. Smiley, of Philadelphia, and left a large family."

== 1840s ==
After the break-up of the original firm of Loud Brothers referred to by Mr. Whitelock, Loud & Company appeared in business in Philadelphia at 170 Chestnut Street for a few years, when they disappeared. Thomas C. Loud, a son of Thomas the inventor, appeared in 305 South Tenth Street about 1838, and continued in the directory up to 1854. Thomas C. Loud, assisted by his father, during the intervening years retrieved the status of the name in connection with pianos, and up to about 1848 did a very large business. John Loud, another of the old firm, enjoyed some distinction as a maker up to 1842, when he went out of the trade as a manufacturer.

The last patent taken out by Thomas Loud was in 1847 and concerned an action, but it was of little consequence.
