= New Mountain Capital =

American alternative investment manager

New Mountain Capital LLC
- Type: Private
- Industry: Alternative investments
- Founded: 1999; 27 years ago
- Founder: Steven Klinsky
- Headquarters: Paramount Plaza, New York City, U.S.
- Products: Private equity; Credit; Net lease
- AUM: US$55 billion (March 2024)
- Number of employees: 195 (2024)
- Website: www.newmountaincapital.com

New Mountain Capital is an American alternative investment firm headquartered in New York City. The firm focuses on growth investing in mid-sized companies from economically acyclical industries.

Outside the U.S., the firm has offices in Europe and Asia.

In June 2024, New Mountain Capital ranked 37th in Private Equity International's PEI 300, ranking among the world's largest private equity firms.

== Background ==
New Mountain was founded in 1999 by Steven Klinsky who was a former partner at Forstmann Little & Company as well as the co-founder of Goldman Sachs' leveraged buyout unit. Klinsky had a minor role during the buyout of RJR Nabisco as the top lieutenant to Theodore J. Forstmann. As a result, when Klinsky founded New Mountain, he wanted to take a different approach to other private equity firms which used high amounts of leverage.

In September 2018, Blackstone Inc. acquired a 9% stake in New Mountain.

In January 2021, it was reported that New Mountain had raised over $10 billion to perform investments. This came in the form of two funds, a $9.6 billion flagship private-equity vehicle and a $640 million pool earmarked for noncontrolling stakes in companies.

As of 2024, New Mountain has returned more capital than it has invested.

== Corporate affairs ==
Mountain Capital has focused on building up mid-sized companies in predictable industries using modest amounts of debt. The companies are mainly family-owned businesses that have never made an acquisition or built operations outside of the US. In many deals, New Mountain forges novel corporate strategies. The approach has helped New Mountain earn large windfall gains at a time when many of its peers are struggling. Klinsky has stated there is a preference for mid-sized companies partially because they offer many more growth opportunities.

At the beginning of each year, New Mountain's investment team evaluated various industries and sectors to identify areas with the strongest potential for investment opportunities and long term growth. This process helps the firm adapt to changing industry or economic conditions while reallocating resources away from less attractive sectors.

In January 2025, New Mountain Capital announced the launch of New Mountain Wealth Solutions, a new platform to support RIA and its customers. Led by industry veteran Raleigh Peters, the team said it is backed by an eight-member team of experts along with 160 investment professionals from New Mountain.

== Notable deals ==
- In March 2010, Mountain Capital acquired RedPrairie for $550 million which after restructuring became a leader in identifying supply chain bottlenecks. In 2021, Mountain Capital sold the rebranded company, Blue Yonder, to Panasonic for $8 billion earning over $5 billion in gains.
- In August 2010, Mountain Capital acquired Avantor for under $300 million which it pushed into specialised chemicals that earn higher margins. In 2019 Avantor was listed earning Mountain Capital over $3 billion in gains.
- In 2017, New Mountain acquired and merged two small home healthcare companies in the sector for less than $500 million and renamed the group Signify Health. In September 2022, it was sold to CVS Health for $8 billion.
- In May 2024, New Mountain led a consortium to acquire a 60% stake in Grant Thornton's U.S. unit and centers on the non-audit business.
