= Harleysville, Pennsylvania =

Unincorporated community in Pennsylvania, US

Harleysville
- Census-designated place
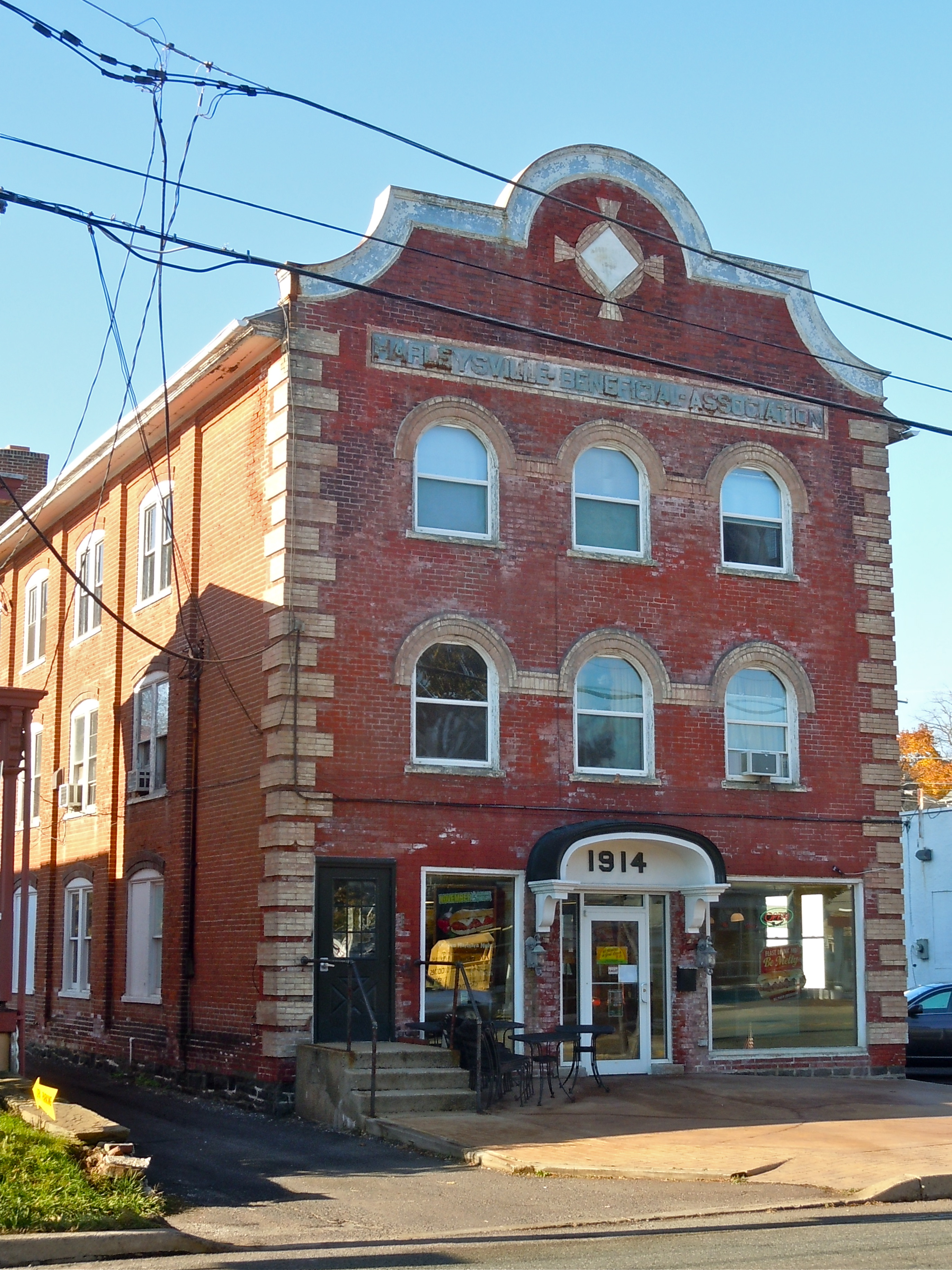
- Harleysville Beneficial Association Building on Main Street in downtown Harleysville

- Location of Harleysville in Pennsylvania Harleysville (the United States)
- Coordinates: 40°16′46″N 75°23′14″W
- Country: United States
- State: Pennsylvania
- County: Montgomery
- Townships: Lower Salford Township, Franconia Township
- Settled: c. 1700

Area
  - Total: 4.18 sq mi (10.83 km^{2})
  - Land: 4.18 sq mi (10.82 km^{2})
  - Water: 0.0039 sq mi (0.01 km^{2})
- Elevation: 266 ft (81 m)

Population (2020)
  - Total: 9,899
  - Density: 2,369.7/sq mi (914.94/km^{2})
- Demonym: Harleysvillian
- Time zone: UTC-5 (EST)
  - Summer (DST): UTC-4 (EDT)
- ZIP Code: 19438
- Area codes: 215, 267, and 445
- FIPS code: 42-32616
- Website: lowersalfordtownship.org

Harleysville is a census-designated place (CDP) in Montgomery County, Pennsylvania, United States. Located at the junction of Pennsylvania Route 63 and Route 113, it is a suburb of Philadelphia and is approximately 30 miles northwest of the city. The population was 9,899 at the 2020 census. It is located mostly within Lower Salford Township and also in Franconia Township. Harleysville was settled in the 18th century by Pennsylvania Dutch farmers and merchants.

== History ==
The land that became Harleysville was originally Lenape territory. The Lenape were Indigenous peoples of the Northeastern Woodlands. Their land, Lenapehoking (Lënapehòkink), stretched along the eastern seaboard from Delaware to Connecticut. Some of their roads through the woods eventually became Pennsylvania Route 63 and Route 113.

In 1681, Charles II of England granted a large tract of land to William Penn that became Pennsylvania. In 1717 Pennsylvania surveyor David Powell received a grant of three thousand acres of land between the "Skepeck" (Skippack Creek) and a branch of the "Parkyooman" (Perkiomen Creek). He began to sell the land to settlers, including Henry Ruth, who bought 200 acres in February 1718. The Moyer or Meyer family was also in the Harleysville area by 1718.

Settlement continued and by 1741 the population was large enough to create Lower Salford Township, subdivided from Salford Township. Early settlers, mainly of German or Swiss descent, continued to establish farms, mills, and taverns along early roads such as Sumneytown Pike.

The village was named after Samuel Harley (1758–1839), who built a tavern along the Sumneytown Pike in the 1790s. Operating it until the 1830s, he lent his name to what became known as Harleysville. The Harley family maintained a presence in the area into the 19th century and are buried in the Harley Cemetery.

Anabaptist faith traditions have shaped Harleysville since the early 18th century. Christopher Dock, a prominent Mennonite educator, taught locally in the 1730s. Multiple Mennonite and Brethren meetinghouses were built over the years, including the Klein Meetinghouse (c.1750), one of the earliest Brethren churches in America, which still stands today. Many Harleysville families spoke German at home until well into the 20th century. The Mennonite Heritage Center preserves this legacy with museum exhibits and archival collections.

Remaining a modest agricultural village through the 19th century, Harleysville gained electricity, paved roads, and a fire company by the 1920s. The Harleysville National Bank was chartered in 1915. Harleysville Insurance, founded locally in 1917, was headquartered here until its acquisition by Nationwide Mutual Insurance Company in 2012. Post–World War II suburbanization triggered the subdivision of farms into residential developments, backed by growing infrastructure and civic amenities. The Northeast Extension of the Pennsylvania Turnpike (Interstate 476) improved regional access to the community.

In the 21st century Harleysville has grown modestly. Commercial development along Route 63 includes retail centers and banks. Light manufacturing and offices occupy business parks, while agriculture continues in surrounding farmland.

== Geography ==
According to the U.S. Census Bureau, the CDP has a total area of 4.2 square miles (11 km^{2}), all land.

Harleysville is in the watershed of the Perkiomen Creek (a tributary of the Schuylkill River) and is drained by the Indian Creek and Skippack Creek into the Perkiomen.

=== Climate ===
The CDP has a hot-summer humid continental climate (Dfa) and average monthly temperatures range from 30.5 °F in January to 75.2 °F in July.

== Demographics ==
Historical population
Census	Pop.	Note	%±
1990	7,405		—
2000	8,795		18.8%
2010	9,280		5.5%
2020	9,899		6.7%

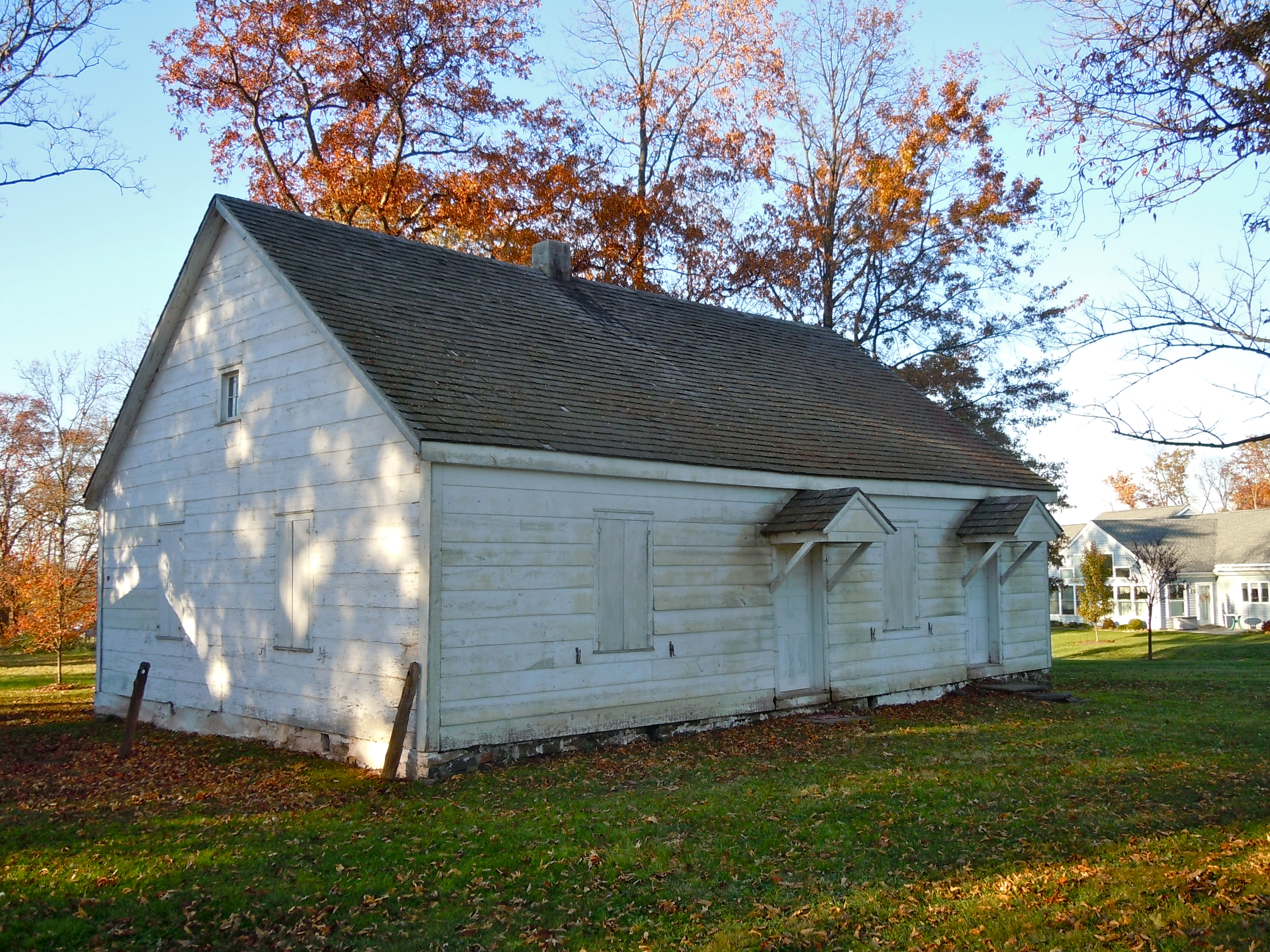
Klein Meetinghouse in Harleysville is listed on the National Register of Historic Places

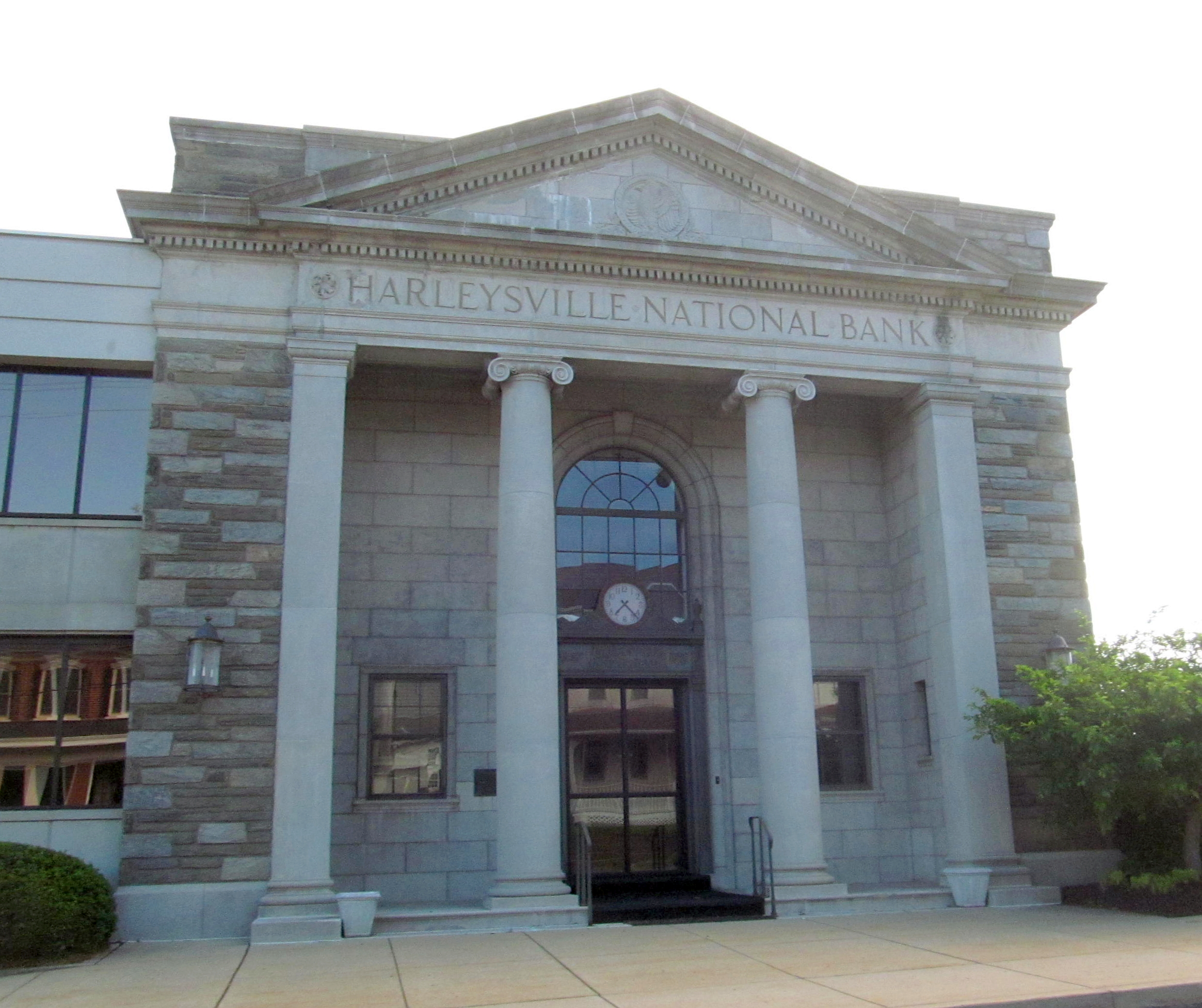
Harleysville National Bank

As of the 2010 census, the CDP was 90.4% Non-Hispanic White, 2.6% Black or African American, 0.1% Native American and Alaskan Native, 3.5% Asian, 0.6% were Some Other Race, and 1.2% were two or more races. 2.4% of the population were of Hispanic or Latino ancestry.

As of the census of 2000, there were 8,795 people, 3,129 households, and 2,381 families residing in the CDP. The population density was 2,111.6 inhabitants per square mile (815.3/km^{2}). There were 3,196 housing units at an average density of 767.3 per square mile (296.3/km^{2}). The racial makeup of the CDP was 93.89% White, 2.62% African American, 0.06% Native American, 2.24% Asian, 0.07% Pacific Islander, 0.34% from other races, and 0.78% from two or more races. Hispanic or Latino of any race were 1.81% of the population.

There were 3,129 households, out of which 41.6% had children under the age of 18 living with them, 66.6% were married couples living together, 7.1% had a female householder with no husband present, and 23.9% were non-families. 19.5% of all households were made up of individuals, and 7.6% had someone living alone who was 65 years of age or older. The average household size was 2.76 and the average family size was 3.21.

In the CDP, the population was spread out, with 28.7% under the age of 18, 6.1% from 18 to 24, 34.7% from 25 to 44, 19.6% from 45 to 64, and 10.8% who were 65 years of age or older. The median age was 35 years. For every 100 females, there were 93.9 males. For every 100 females age 18 and over, there were 89.9 males.

The median income for a household in the CDP was $66,897, and the median income for a family was $75,105. Males had a median income of $49,961 versus $33,185 for females. The per capita income for the CDP was $26,572. About 1.9% of families and 3.3% of the population were below the poverty line, including 3.7% of those under age 18 and 8.3% of those age 65 or over.

== Arts and culture ==
The community hosts annual events that celebrate local history. The Mennonite Heritage Center hosts the Apple Butter Frolic, an autumn festival held since 1974. The event serves as a fundraiser and educational opportunity, featuring traditional Pennsylvania German food, folk craft demonstrations, and the communal preparation of apple butter in copper kettles. Additionally, the Harleysville Community Center serves as the site for the Jaycee's Country Fair Days, a regional summer carnival that includes a parade and fireworks display.

Historical preservation is centered on several key sites, most notably Heckler Plains. One of the oldest properties in Lower Salford Township, the 18th-century farmstead features a rare Rhine Valley bottom barn and a restored farmhouse. It is the site of the annual Heckler Fest, where the Heckler Plains Folklife Society provides colonial-era demonstrations, including flax processing, candle dipping, and vintage baseball games. The site serves both as a historical outdoor museum and a public park.

Religious history is preserved through the Mennonite Heritage Center, which maintains a museum and research library dedicated to the Anabaptist story in southeastern Pennsylvania. The center houses collections of Fraktur (illuminated manuscripts), quilts, and genealogical records spanning over three centuries. Another landmark is the Klein Meetinghouse, which was added to the National Register of Historic Places in 1973. Built in 1843 on land settled in 1720, the meetinghouse reflects the architectural simplicity of the Church of the Brethren and remains a preserved example of early American religious meeting spaces.

== Notable people ==
- Jesse Francis McClendon (1880–1976), chemist and physiologist, died in Harleysville.

== Education ==
Harleysville is part of the Souderton Area School District.

== Media ==
Local news for the Harleysville area is covered by the weekly Souderton Independent. The daily Reporter, a sister paper to the Independent, is also a source of community information.

News for the larger metropolitan area is covered by The Philadelphia Inquirer and the county newspaper The Times Herald.

== Infrastructure ==
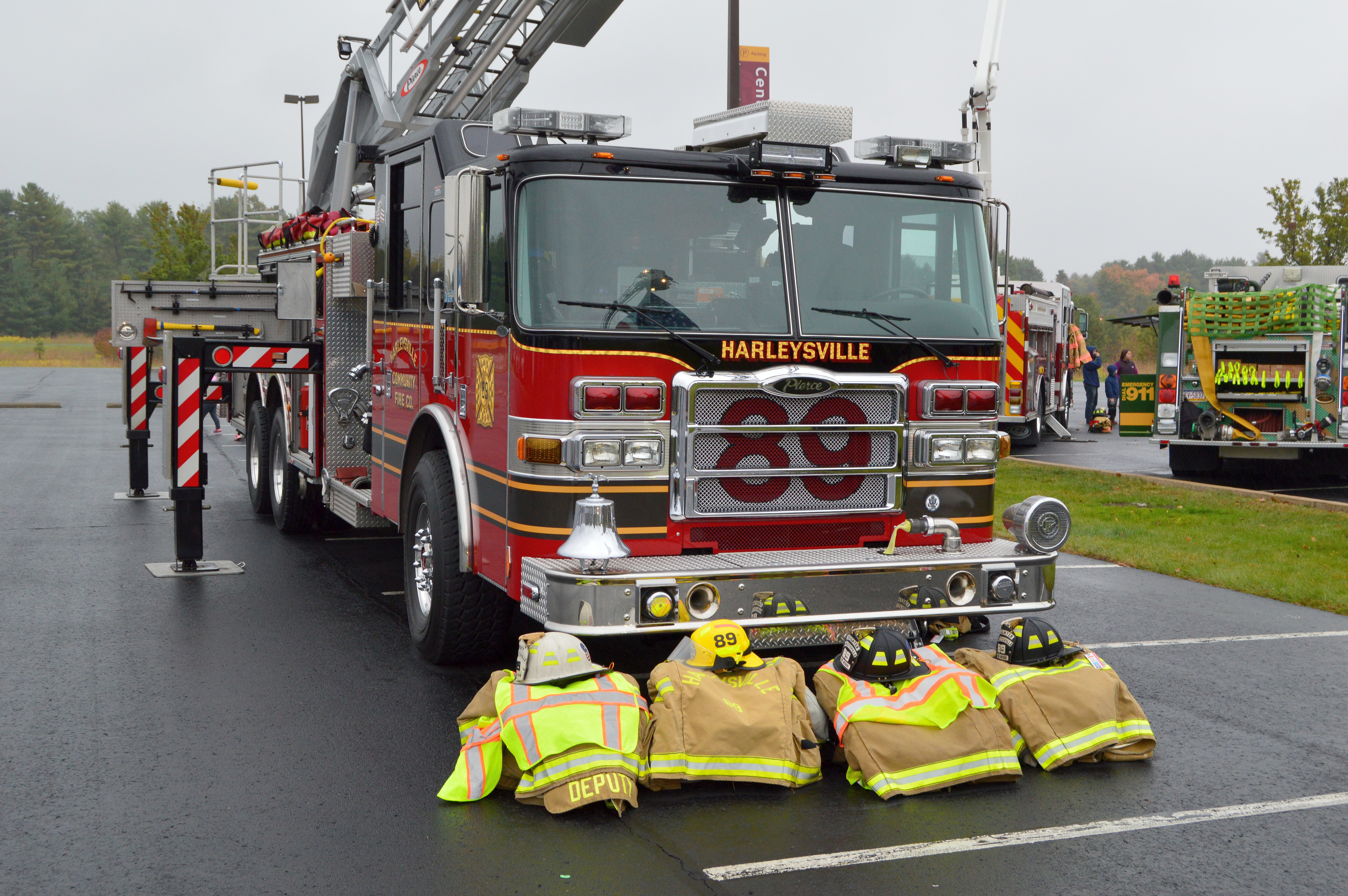
Harleysville Fire Company

Harleysville Fire Company was founded in 1921. Harleysville is served by the Lower Salford Police Department.

Highways include Pennsylvania Route 63 (Main Street) and Pennsylvania Route 113 (Harleysville Pike).
