= EBay Enterprise =

Multinational e-commerce corporation

eBay Enterprise, Inc.
- Formerly: Global Sports (1995–2002); GSI Commerce (2002–2013)
- Type: Division
- Industry: e-Commerce; Marketing services
- Founded: 1995; 31 years ago
- Founder: Michael Rubin
- Defunct: 2016
- Fate: Dissolved
- Successors: Pepperjam; Radial, Inc.
- Headquarters: King of Prussia, Pennsylvania, United States
- Parent: eBay (2011–2015)
- Website: www.ebayenterprise.com

eBay Enterprise, Inc. (formerly GSI Commerce, Inc.) was a multinational e-commerce corporation that specialized in creating, developing and running online shopping sites for brick and mortar brands and retailers. The company also provided a variety of marketing, consumer engagement, customer care, payment processing, fulfillment, fraud detection, and technology integration services.

eBay Enterprise had over 500 clients and operated 26 offices in North America, Europe, and Asia. It provided services for companies such as Zales, iRobot, Timberland, Ace Hardware, Sports Authority, Dick's Sporting Goods, and RadioShack.

== History ==
=== Founding and growth ===
Founded by Michael Rubin in 1995 as Global Sports Incorporated, the company focused on selling sporting goods and supplies. In 1999, it branched out into clothing and a variety of other categories and changed its name to GSI Commerce in 2002. Toys "R" Us, one of GSI's largest e-commerce partners, chose GSI after suing Amazon.com for breach of its exclusivity contract. In October 2000, GSI acquired Fogdog.com, an online sporting goods store. In August 2007, GSI acquired Accretive Commerce, a company with a similar business model, for $97.5 million. In 2008, it was announced that Innotrac, a similar e-commerce company with fulfillment centers located throughout the United States, would be acquired, however, the deal was canceled in January 2009. The company acquired e-Dialog in 2008; as well as Retail Convergence, operators of Rue La La and Smartbargains.com, in 2009.

In September 2008, GSI and Timberland reached a settlement of up to $7,000,000 with a class of cell phone subscribers who alleged that they received unsolicited SMS text messages advertising for Timberland. Both Timberland and GSI denied any wrongful conduct and stated that a completely separate and independent company was responsible for securing the consents of the class members to receive the text messages. The settlement was significant as it was the first nationwide settlement for unsolicited text messages under the Telephone Consumer Protection Act.

On November 9, 2009, the company re-branded its marketing-services division, GSI Interactive, as True Action.

On March 21, 2010, the company and its former CEO, Michael Rubin, were featured on the CBS television series Undercover Boss.

On April 21, 2010, e-Dialog, a GSI Commerce Marketing Services division, announced the acquisition of M3 Mobile Marketing, a Philadelphia-based company which offers a full-service mobile marketing model.

On May 3, 2010, e-Dialog announced the acquisition of MBS, a database marketing solutions provider, from World Marketing Inc.

In 2010, the company announced the launch of ShopRunner http://shoprunner.com, a members-only online shopping program that offers savvy consumers unlimited free two-day shipping with no minimum order size, and free shipping on returns, across a wide selection of today's most popular retailers. ShopRunner also offers members the ability to combine fast, free shipping with exclusive money-saving deals direct from its retail partners.

=== eBay ownership ===
On March 28, 2011, it was announced that eBay Inc. would acquire GSI for $2.4 billion. The deal was closed on June 20, 2011.

On June 20, 2013, the company announced that it would be retiring the GSI Commerce name in favor of eBay Enterprise.

Magento, Inc. became a part of eBay Enterprise on November 21, 2013. eBay Inc. had purchased Magento on June 6, 2011, prior to completing the acquisition of GSI Commerce.

=== Sale and dissolution ===
On July 16, 2015, the Permira-led consortium of buyers including Sterling Partners, Longview Asset Management, Innotrac, Inc., and companies owned by Permira funds began the process to buy the company.

On November 2, 2015, the sale was finalized for $925 million and eBay Enterprise became an independent company. The company was split into 4 parts: enterprise operations and technology services, Magento Commerce Technologies, Marketing Solutions, and customer relationship management (CRM). The CRM business was acquired by Zeta Interactive.

The photography, video and copywriting services division of eBay Enterprise was sold to Industrial Color Brands on March 28, 2016, for an undisclosed amount.

eBay Enterprise Marketing Solutions rebranded as Pepperjam on April 7, 2016.

On April 19, 2016, the enterprise services division of eBay Enterprise merged with Innotrac and officially became Radial, Inc.

== List of acquisitions ==
- FogDog (2000)
- Accretive Commerce (2007)
- e-Dialog (2008)
- Silverlign (2009)
- Pepperjam Network (2009)
- Retail Convergence (2009)
- VendorNet (2010)
- FetchBack (2010)
- ClearSaleing (2011)
- Fanatics (2011)

== List of divestitures ==
- Fanatics (2012)
- Retail Convergence (2012)
