= Radial, Inc. =

American multinational e-commerce company

- Type: Subsidiary
- Industry: E-commerce
- Predecessor: eBay Enterprise, Inc.; Innotrac Corporation
- Founded: 2016
- Headquarters: King of Prussia, Pennsylvania, United States
- Key people: Henri de Romrée (President & CEO)
- Number of employees: 7,000+ (2016)
- Parent: bnode group
- Website: radial.com

Radial, Inc. is an American multinational e-commerce company based in King of Prussia, Pennsylvania. It provides order management, payment processing, order routing, fulfillment, and analytics services for companies such as GameStop, DSW, Shoe Carnival and Destination XL.

== History ==
Radial was formed from the merger of Innotrac Corporation and the enterprise services unit of eBay Enterprise.

=== Merger ===
Sterling Partners, a private equity firm, acquired Innotrac on January 6, 2014, for $8.20 per share. The buyout totaled $108 million. Innotrac provided customer support and fulfillment services to retailers, software providers, and telecommunications companies.

On November 2, 2015, Sterling Partners acquired eBay Enterprise's operations and enterprise technology services division. Sterling Partners planned to merge Innotrac and the group from eBay Enterprise.

The combined company, Radial, was announced on April 19, 2016. Sterling Partners estimated Radial's initial value at more than $1 billion.

=== Bpost ===
In October 2017, the Belgian Post Group, also known as bpost, acquired Radial for $820 million.
