= The Blum Store =

Former clothing store in Philadelphia

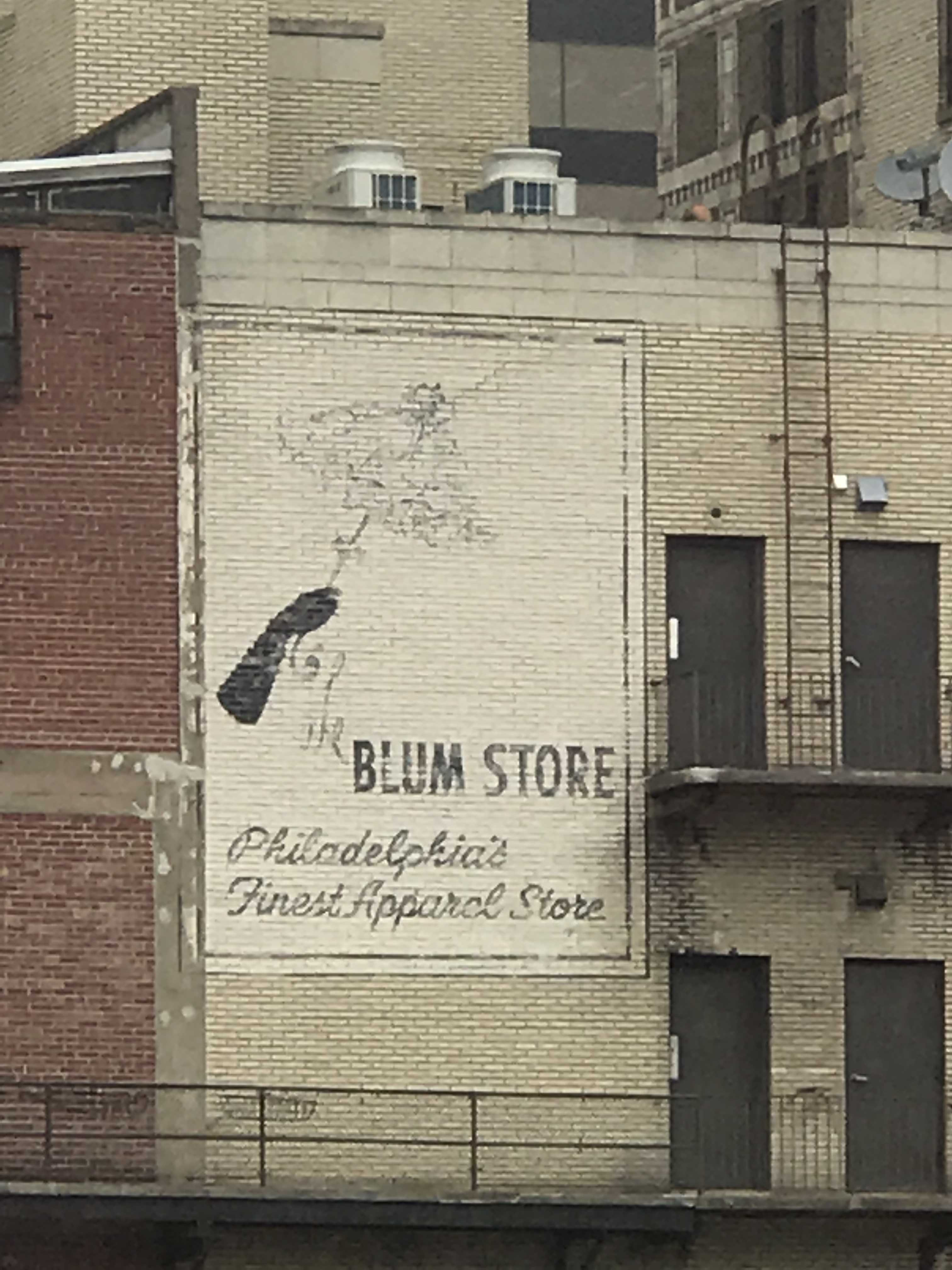
- Ad for The Blum Store
- Formerly: Blum Brothers Dry Goods
- Industry: Clothing industry
- Defunct: 1976

The Blum Store was a women's specialty store on the corner of 13th and Chestnut Streets in Philadelphia, Pennsylvania, with three branch locations in the Philadelphia suburbs. The store was comparable in quality, style, and reputation to larger chains Bonwit Teller and Lord & Taylor and was one of the premier chains headquartered in Philadelphia, selling women's clothing and accessories and children's clothing.

== History ==
The store was founded as Blum Brothers Dry Goods in the late 19th century, The company and the Blum name was acquired by Maurice Spector in 1920. Spector's gift for merchandising expanded the store's clientele, and the firm soon opened branch locations in Bala Cynwyd and Exton, Pennsylvania, and Moorestown, New Jersey. Spector died in 1959, and in 1975, Julio Tanjeloff, an Argentine investor and owner of George Jensen and Rosenthal Studios in Philadelphia, acquired the business, leading to the closure of a branch and concerns for the continuing viability of the chain. According to a story in The New York Times at the time of the purchase, Tanjeloff planned to liquidate the stores' inventory and then reopen them with new personnel.

The first Blum Store in Philadelphia opened in 1920, the year Spector purchased the business from Blum. Its ten-story flagship fashion building on the northwest corner of 13th & Chestnut Streets opened its doors in 1928. In 1957, Blum's opened a 40,000-square-foot Bala Cynwyd, Pennsylvania, branch. In 1966, The Blum Store was acquired by Weiss Bros. Stores; Weiss also operated several other chains around the country including Gus Meyer stores in New Orleans, Louisiana. In 1971, Blum's opened a branch in the former C.A. Rowell store at the Moorestown, New Jersey, Mall. A smaller fourth store in Exton, Pennsylvania, was open only briefly before Blum's fortunes spiraled downwards. Changing times were hard on the chain; the number of new debutantes had diminished, shopping malls had sprouted, and denim had replaced tweed. Several ownership changes also had taken their toll on the health of the business. In December 1975, all of the store's branches closed. Plans to revive the brand were discussed but did not materialize. By the next summer, Blum's sold only a small amount of clothes, crystal, and glassware and housed the Jean Madeleine Beauty Salon; then the store's employees' paychecks bounced and owners of the beauty salon were forced to pay the building's overdue utility bills. By the end of the summer of 1976, The Blum Store--"the working girl's Neiman Marcus"—had joined a growing list of American department stores that had gone out of business.
