= VWR International =

U.S. chemicals company

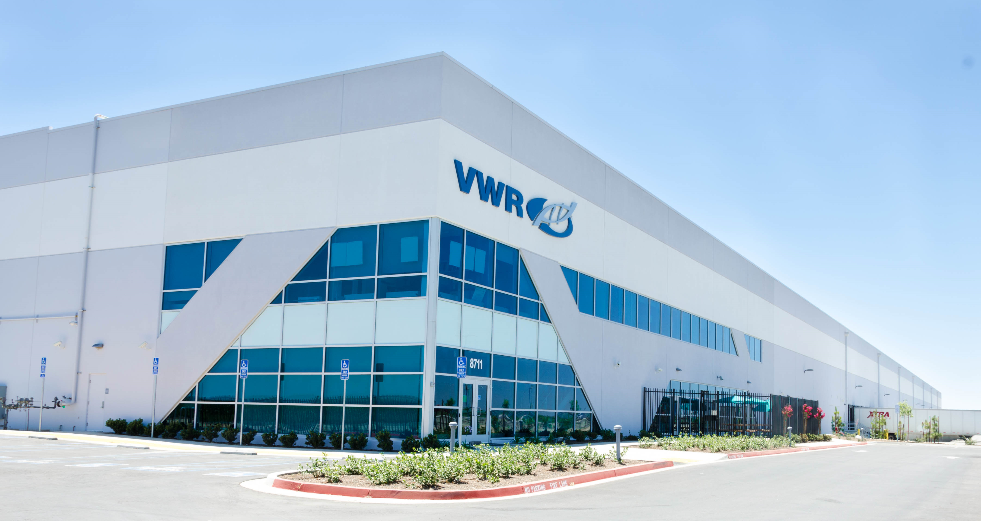
- Company type: Subsidiary
- Industry: Scientific products distributor
- Founded: 1852; 174 years ago
- Headquarters: Radnor, Pennsylvania, United States
- Key people: Emmanuel Ligner (CEO)
- Products: Chemicals, protective clothing, research equipment, specialized laboratory furniture
- Services: Laboratory services, clinical and biorepository services, procurement services
- Revenue: $5.9 billion (2018)
- Number of employees: Over 12,000 worldwide
- Parent: Avantor
- Website: www.vwr.com

VWR International is an American company involved in the distribution of research laboratory products headquartered in Radnor, Pennsylvania. VWR primarily serves the government, biotechnology, life science, education, electronics and pharmaceutical sectors. In 2010, the company maintained operations in 25 countries.

== History ==
VWR was founded by John Taylor as the John Taylor Company in 1852, selling mining and laboratory products. Since then, the company evolved to focus on the laboratory market. It also has a presence in the cleanroom, safety, and clinical markets.

In 1902, it was purchased by F.W. Braun, and merged into his company the F.W. Braun Corporation. In 1908, Braun left the F.W. Braun Corporation, and formed Braun-Knecht-Heimann with Gustav Knecht and Richard Heimann. In 1950, George Van Waters and Nat Rogers purchased Braun-Knecht-Heimann, and in 1953 they purchased the F.W. Braun Corporation, merging with their chemical distribution company Van Waters and Rogers, which they had founded in 1924. In 1974, the VWR United Corporation became Univar Corporation, and in 1986, split into Univar and VWR Corporation.

VWR owns a group of companies under the unofficial umbrella "VWR Education." These companies include Science Kit and Boreal Laboratories and a catalog operation they acquired from Edmund Scientific Corporation in 2001. In August 1989, VWR purchased Wards's Science and Sargent-Welch Scientific Company.

In September, 1995, VWR completed their purchase of Baxter's Industrial division, creating a much larger company. The capital was primarily obtained from Merck KGaA, a German chemical manufacturer (known as EMD Chemicals in the U.S. and Canada) who later purchased VWR and merged them with Merck Eurolab, creating a global laboratory distributor. In 2004, VWR became a limited partnership controlled by investment firm Clayton, Dubilier & Rice.

In 2007, CD&R sold VWR to another private equity company, Madison Dearborn Partners.

In 2010, VWR moved its world headquarters to Radnor, Pennsylvania.

Controversy has arisen about a 2010 decision by VWR to close its unionized Brisbane, CA distribution center, moving operations to a non-unionized Visalia, CA facility. This facility has now voted in the union for equal pay for equal work. They pay the Material Handlers $10 an hour when the other distribution centers start at a much higher rate. VWR will not allow this facility to be unionized and will not work out a contract.

In 2011, VWR acquired AMRESCO Inc., a manufacturer and supplier of biochemicals and reagents for molecular biology, histology and related areas of research and production.

On June 1, 2011, VWR International acquired BioExpress Corp (formerly ISC BioExpress), raising concerns of monopolization of the laboratory supplies sector along with Thermo Fisher Scientific.

On October 2, 2014, VWR's IPO raised $536 million, valuing the value of the company at close to $5 billion.

In January 2016, VWR acquired Therapak Corporation, an assembler and distributor of medical convenience kits with locations in Claremont, CA, Buford, GA, Hayes, UK and Skalice, CZ.

In April 2017, VWR acquired MESM Ltd., a provider of laboratory and medical equipment and supplies for use in clinical trials worldwide. VWR acquired two other companies earlier in the year, EPL Archives and Seastar Chemicals

On May 5, 2017, it was announced that Avantor would acquire VWR for $33.25 in cash per share of VWR common stock, reflecting an enterprise value of approximately $6.4 billion. Avantor is a Radnor, Pennsylvania based life science tools company.

On November 21, 2017, Avantor completed its acquisition of VWR.
