= J & W Van Duzen & Company =

19th century Philadelphia shipbuilding firm

- Industry: Shipbuilding
- Founded: 1834; 192 years ago
- Founders: John Van Duzen; Mathew Van Duzen; Washington Van Duzen; Christian Gulager
- Defunct: ?
- Headquarters: Philadelphia, United States

J & W Van Duzen & Company, was a 19th-century, Philadelphia shipbuilding firm. It was formed in 1834 by brothers John, Mathew and Washington Van Duzen and their brother-in-law Captain Christian Gulager. The three sons of an earlier Philadelphia shipbuilder, Mathew Van Duzen who came from New York in 1795.

Washington Van Duzen patented the first marine railway in Philadelphia, in 1834. It was subsequently built by J. & W. Van Dusen & Co., at Kensington, Philadelphia in 1834-35.

Mathew Van Dusen was mentor to Domingo Marcucci who later became an important early shipbuilder in San Francisco.
