= Zivtech =

- Company type: Private Limited
- Industry: Web development
- Founded: 2008
- Headquarters: Philadelphia
- Services: Websites and web applications
- Website: www.zivtech.com

Zivtech is a Philadelphia-based open-source software development firm that designs and builds websites and web applications for organizations worldwide.

== Operations ==
Zivtech uses Drupal and other open source tools to design websites, web applications, and infrastructure. The company participates in the Drupal open source community and is an active GitHub user. Among its notable products is LivIT, which leverages software to enable home based medical monitoring as a SaaS. Zivtech's CTO Jody Hamilton was named a Grand Master Developer in 2015.

Zivtech partners with several platforms and organizations including Acquia and is a member of the Greater Philadelphia Chamber of Commerce. The Great Agencies, an internet services ranking website, reported Zivtech to rank #7 out of over 1,000 custom web app companies and Bizjournals cited the company on its top systems integrators list for 2015. Clients have posted positive reviews for Zivtech on the B2B review site Clutch.io.

The company has received media attention for its appearance and culture in the 4,400-square-foot office located in the Philadelphia Building. Zivtech was in the Small/Medium-Sized Companies category in the 2015 100 Best Places to Work in Pennsylvania list by PA Department of Community and Economic Development and the Central Penn Business Journal.
