= Avantor =

U.S. chemical company

Avantor, Inc.
- Type: Public
- Traded as: NYSE: AVTR; S&P 400 component
- Industry: Biotechnology; Chemicals; Pharmaceuticals
- Founded: 1904; 122 years ago
- Headquarters: Radnor, Pennsylvania, U.S.
- Key people: Emmanuel Ligner (CEO)
- Brands: VWR International; J.T. Baker
- Revenue: US$6.967 billion (2024)
- Net income: US$321 million
- Owner: New Mountain Capital (10%); Funds advised by Goldman Sachs (13%)
- Number of employees: 14,500 (December 2023)
- Website: avantorsciences.com

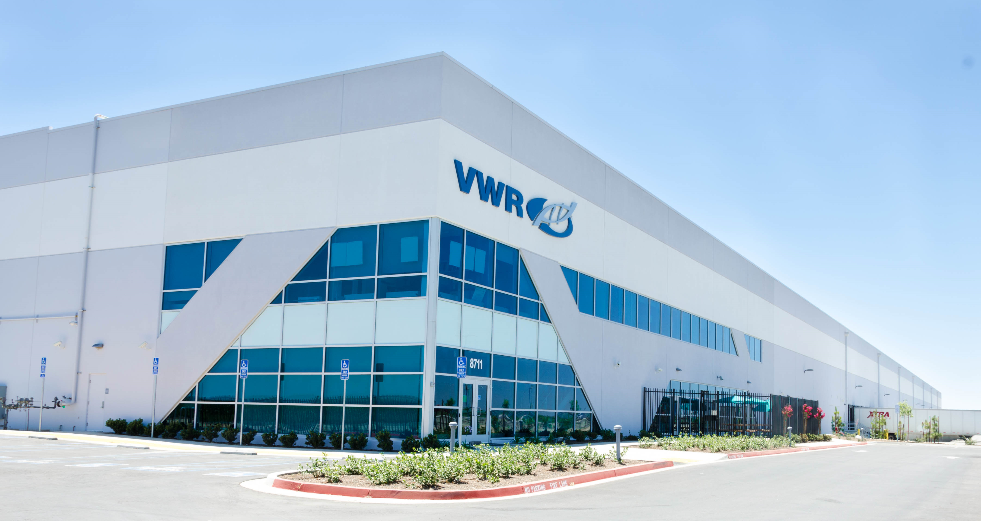
VWR int. Headquarters in Penn.

Avantor, Inc. is an American biotechnology, chemicals, and pharmaceutical company headquartered in Radnor, Pennsylvania. Established in 1904 as J.T. Baker, the company changed its name to Avantor in 2010. Avantor went public in 2019 and is now listed on the New York Stock Exchange under the symbol “AVTR”.

== History ==
The company's history traces back to 1904, when John Townsend Baker (1860–1935) founded the chemical company J.T. Baker specializing in producing chemically pure reagents. The company gained recognition for its "Baker Analyzed" labels, which provided detailed analyses of trace impurities in its products. In 1911, the company began publishing "The Chemist-Analyst," which promoted its products and philosophy. After Baker's death in 1935, the company was acquired by Vick Chemical Company in 1941. During World War II, J.T. Baker expanded its product line to include penicillin, pesticides, and chemicals for batteries and munitions. After the war, the company further diversified into high-purity solvents, chromatography columns, and hazardous waste spill kits. In 1985, J.T. Baker and its parent company Richardson-Vicks were sold to Procter & Gamble, and subsequently sold to Mallinckrodt in 1995.

In 2010, investment firm New Mountain Capital purchased Mallinckrodt Baker Inc., which then changed its name to Avantor. The company extended its international market with the 2011 acquisitions of the Indian laboratory reagents supplier RFCL and the Polish lab supply firm POCH.

In 2016, Avantor merged with Nusil Technology. In 2017, Avantor acquired chemical blending business Puritan Products Inc. and laboratory supplies company VWR. The combined company operates under the Avantor name, with VWR and vwr.com remaining as a selling channel.

In May 2019, Avantor went public with a $3.8 billion initial public offering, which gave the company a market capitalization of $7.62 billion. As of December 2023, the top shareholders of Avantor included Vanguard Group Inc., Dodge & Cox Inc., T. Rowe Price Investment Management Inc., and BlackRock Inc.

That same year the company expanded further into Asia with the opening of an innovation center in Shanghai, which focuses on monoclonal antibodies and cell and gene therapy. In 2020, Avantor doubled the size of its Bridgewater, New Jersey innovation center, expanding its research and development capabilities and cell and gene therapy reagent manufacturing.

In 2020, Avantor began providing services and raw materials to companies manufacturing vaccines and other therapies to fight the COVID-19 pandemic. Avantor added employees and extra shifts in order to increase capacity for producing synthetic lipids that are formed into nanoparticles, which carry mRNA into human cells.

In June 2021, Avantor acquired China-based RIM Bio, a manufacturer of single-use bioprocess bags and assemblies for biopharmaceutical manufacturing applications. Through the acquisition, Avantor gained access to RIM's Changzhou, China facility, marking Avantor's first single-use production plant in the Africa, Middle East, Asia (AMEA) region. The deal is part of a larger expansion of the company's single-use manufacturing footprint with plans to increase its presence by 30%.

The company ranked 485th in 2023 and 506 in 2024 on the Fortune 500, based on its sales records.

== Controversies ==
On August 26, 2020, Bloomberg News implicated Avantor and other companies in the U.S. opioid epidemic. According to Bloomberg, one of their compounds "acetic anhydride", was used illicitly by drug traffickers to convert crude opium into heroin. Bloomberg also found evidence that Avantor's compound was used in cartel drug labs, and that regulations implemented in 2018 didn't stop it from being widely available. In response, Avantor discontinued all sales of acetic anhydride in Mexico and destroyed its existing inventory. In 2021, Texas Senator John Cornyn, who serves on both the Judiciary Committee and the bipartisan Caucus on International Narcotics Control claims that Avantor should have known better, selling acetic anhydride within Mexico's unregulated market. What should have raised eyebrows as well is that it was sold in 18-liter containers, which is inconsistent with the ordinary use of acetic anhydride. Four other Republican senators also deplored Avantor's “apparent longstanding contribution to the opioid epidemic that killed 50,000 of our fellow citizens in 2019.”
