= Bpost =

Belgian company responsible for the delivery of national and international mail

- Traded as: Euronext Brussels: BPOST
- ISIN: BE0974268972
- Industry: Postal services; Courier
- Founder: 1830
- Headquarters: Brussels, Belgium
- Key people: Jos Donvil (CEO); Audrey Hanard (Chair)
- Products: Mail, Courier, Logistics, Insurance
- Owner: bnode group (Belgian State 50.01%)
- Subsidiaries: Radial, Inc.
- Website: bpost.be

Bpost (stylised bpost) is the Belgian company responsible for the delivery of mail in Belgium. Part of the Belgian Post Group, it is one of the largest civilian employers in Belgium. It provides a range of postal, courier, direct marketing, banking, insurance, and electronic services in a highly competitive European market. The headquarters are located in Brussels at the Monnaie Center (Rue de l'Evêque/Bisschopsstraat).

Before 2010, it was known as De Post in Dutch and La Poste in French, meaning "the Post" in each case in English.

== Ownership ==
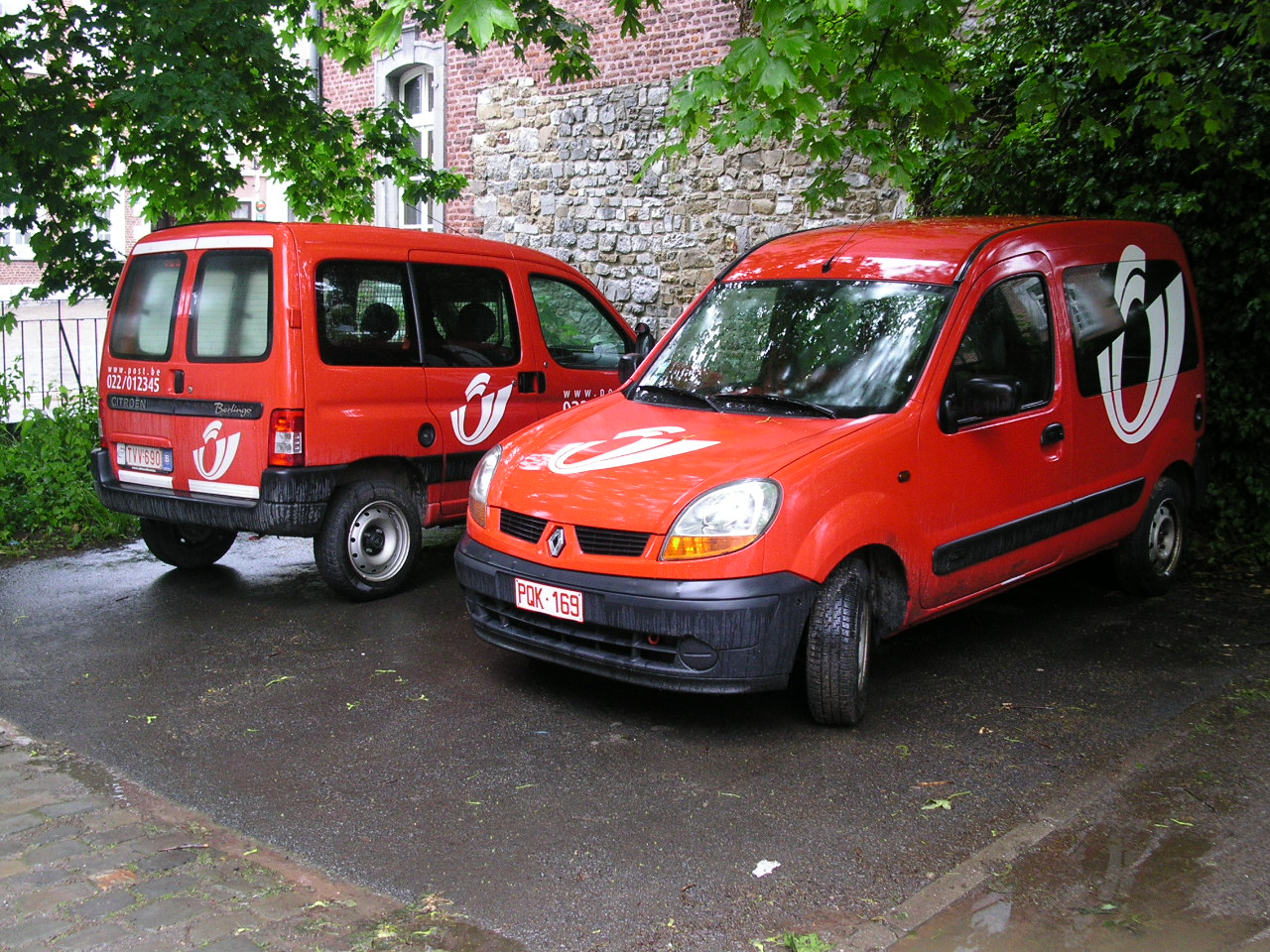
Belgium Post delivery vehicles with the older (2000–2010) post horn logo

By royal decree of 17 March 2000, the Post cast off its status of autonomous public enterprise to adopt the status of a public limited liability company. Its public service missions are all described that it concluded with the Belgian state.

In January 2006, Post Danmark and CVC Capital Partners signed an agreement with the Belgian government on the acquisition of 50% minus one share in the Belgian Post for €300 million. Post Danmark had been selected by the Belgian government a partner because it would assist bpost in modernizing the company. The Belgian government, bpost, Post Danmark and CVC have prepared a joint plan for developing the Belgian Post.

Bpost is a subsidiary of Bnode, also known as the Belgian Post Group, which also ownes Paxon (logistics operator) and Landmark Global.

=== Acquisitions ===
Certipost is a Belgian electronic communications subsidiary of bpost based in Aalst founded in 2002. They produce solutions to issues with electronic document exchange and archiving including digital certificate and electronic identity cards.

In December 2012, bpost acquired a 51% majority stake in Landmark Global, a US-based company specializing in cross-border parcel logistics and shipping technology. This acquisition marked a strategic expansion into the North American market to offset declining domestic mail volumes, a trend heavily influencing European postal operators at the time. bpost subsequently increased its ownership stake over time, acquiring an additional 24.5% in 2016 and the remaining balance to reach 100% ownership by 2017.

In October 2017, bpost acquired American e-commerce company Radial, Inc. for US$820 million.

== Controversies ==
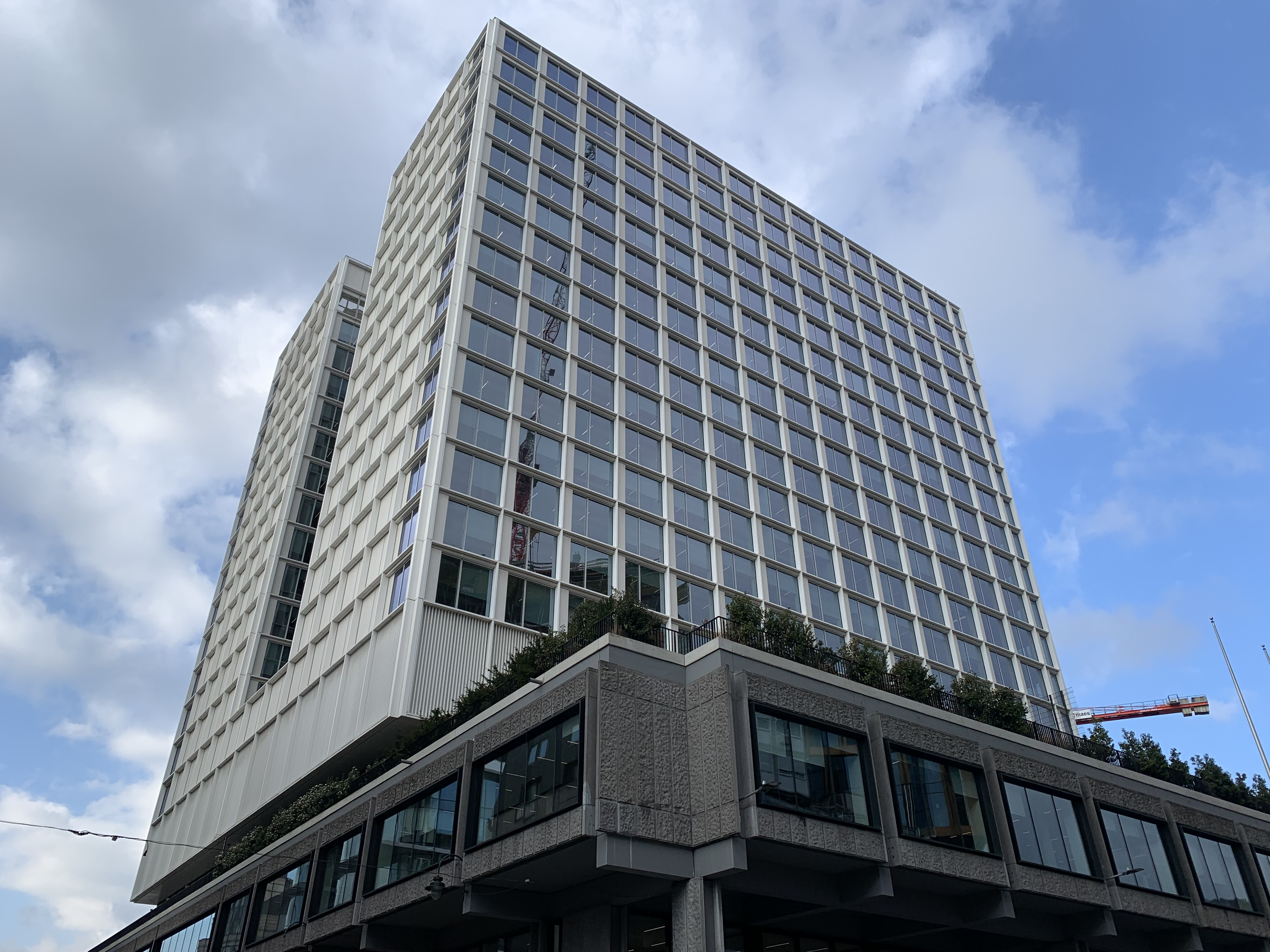
Headquarters in Brussels

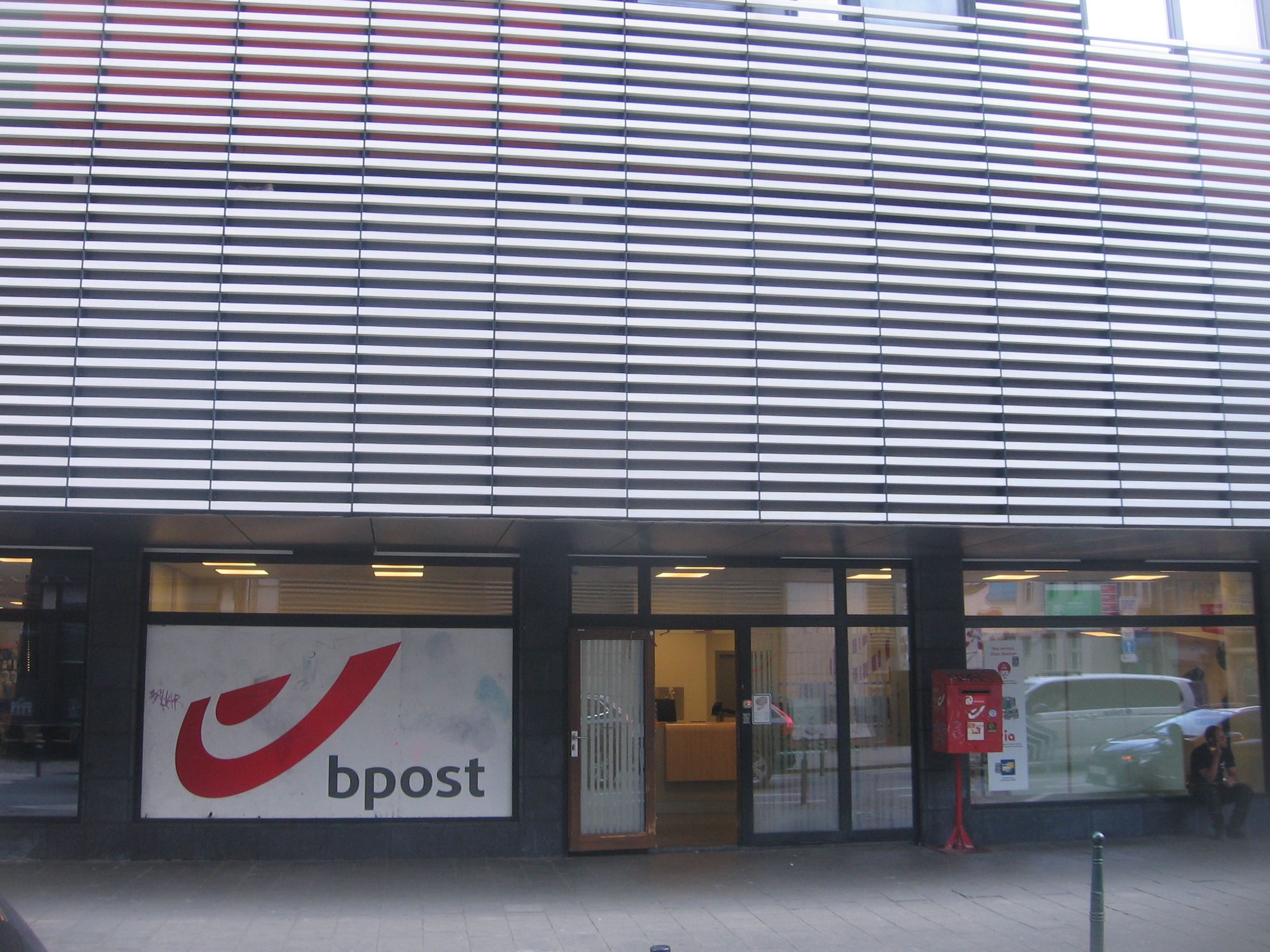
A Bpost office near Manneken Pis in Brussels

Bpost is accused of having entered into spurious contracts with the Belgian government, overstating costs for delivering newspapers to receive elevated subsidies and a host of other allegedly fraudulent operations. In April 2023 Bpost was forced to admit it had broken European competition rules and had overcharged by tens of millions of Euros amid reports of secret deals between the company and the Belgian state. In total, Bpost is said to have received €4 billion in public spending between 2013 and 2023. According to journalists, most of these subsidies and fees are questionable and are the result of close ties between the Belgian state and the company.

Bpost use monopoly power to allegedly make questionable price-fixing agreements with publishers DPG media and Mediahuis, as was revealed by an internal audit in 2023.

In August 2023, Kathleen Van Beveren, chief executive of E-logistics Eurasia at Bpost and a member of its executive committee, stepped down from her role amid accusations of fraud and foul play inside the company.
