= Owasso High School =

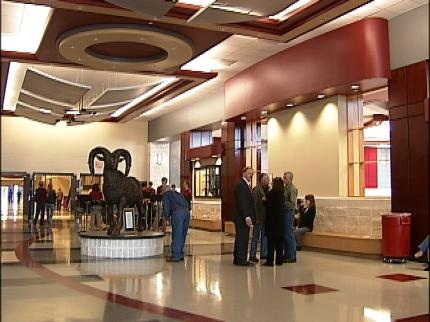
- The main entryway of Owasso High School's East Campus

Location
- 12901 East 86th Street North; Green Country; Owasso, Tulsa County, Oklahoma 74055; United States; 36°16′47″N 95°49′42″W

Information
- Other name: OHS
- School type: Local, state, federal government allocations, bond initiatives, federal programs, community contributions, Public high school
- Motto: Once a Ram, Always a Ram
- Established: September 1975
- School board: Owasso Public Schools Board of Education
- School district: Owasso Public Schools
- NCES District ID: 4023280
- Superintendent: Dr. Margaret Coates
- Principal: Tiffani Cooper
- Teaching staff: 139
- Employees: 282
- Grades: 9-12
- Age range: 14-18
- Enrollment: 3,068 (2023–2024)
- Classes: 131
- Student to teacher ratio: 21:1
- Language: English
- Hours in school day: 6 hours, 45 minutes
- Campuses: East Campus, West Campus
- Campus type: Suburban
- Colors: Red, black, and white
- Song: Owasso Alma Mater
- Fight song: Owasso Fight Song
- Athletics conference: 6A District 1
- Sports: Baseball, Basketball (Boys), Basketball (Girls), Cheer, Cross country, Football, Golf (Boys), Golf (Girls), Pom, Soccer (Boys), Soccer (Girls), Softball, Swimming (Boys & Girls), Tennis (Boys), Tennis (Girls), Track and Field, Volleyball, Wrestling
- Mascot: Rambo
- Nickname: Rams
- Rival: Bixby Spartans; Broken Arrow Tigers; Sand Springs Sandites
- USNWR ranking: 10,785
- Newspaper: Owasso RamPage
- Yearbook: Trail's End
- Alumni: Randy Blake, Dylan Bundy, Aaron Colvin, Brian Flynn, Keon Hatcher, Jon Kolb, Pete Kozma, Shake Milton, Paul Smith, Braden Webb
- Website: ohs.owassops.org
- Last updated: November 28, 2024

Owasso High School is a high school located within Tulsa County in Owasso, Oklahoma, United States. It is among the largest high schools in Oklahoma by enrollment with nearly 3,000 students. In 2024, the school received international attention following the death of Nex Benedict.

The district (of which this is the sole comprehensive high school) includes Owasso, a small portion of Tulsa, Limestone, and a small portion of Valley Park. It is located within the 7,000 square-mile Cherokee Nation reservation in northeastern Oklahoma.

== History ==
=== Owasso Independent School District v. Falvo ===
In the 2002 case Owasso Independent School District v. Falvo, the U.S. Supreme Court addressed whether the practice of peer grading in classrooms violated the Family Educational Rights and Privacy Act (FERPA) of 1974. FERPA restricts educational institutions from releasing students' education records without parental consent.

The lawsuit began when Kristja J. Falvo, a parent in the Owasso Independent School District in Oklahoma, challenged the district's practice of allowing students to grade each other's assignments and announce the scores aloud. She argued that this method embarrassed her children and constituted an unlawful disclosure of educational records under FERPA. After the school district declined to change its policy, Falvo filed a lawsuit.

=== LGBT issues ===
Owasso High School in Oklahoma has faced significant challenges regarding LGBTQ+ issues, particularly following the tragic death of 16-year-old nonbinary student Nex Benedict in February 2024. Benedict died by suicide a day after a physical altercation in a school bathroom, an incident reportedly linked to bullying over their gender identity.

In the wake of Benedict's death, students organized walkouts to protest anti-LGBTQ+ bullying and to demand a safer environment for all students. These events drew national attention to the school's handling of such issues.

A federal investigation by the U.S. Department of Education's Office for Civil Rights revealed that Owasso Public Schools had violated Title IX by failing to adequately address sexual harassment complaints. The investigation found that the district did not properly inform students and parents about filing formal complaints or offer necessary support services. As a result, the district agreed to implement comprehensive anti-harassment policies, provide training for staff and students, and issue a public statement against harassment.

=== Death of Nex Benedict ===
In February 2024, Owasso High School in Oklahoma became the center of national attention following the death of 16-year-old student Nex Benedict, who identified as nonbinary. On February 7, Nex was involved in a physical altercation with three students in the school's girls' restroom. The following day, Benedict collapsed at home and was later pronounced dead at a local hospital.

The Oklahoma State Medical Examiner's Office conducted an autopsy and, on March 13, ruled Benedict's death a suicide resulting from the combined toxicity of diphenhydramine (an antihistamine) and fluoxetine (an antidepressant). The report noted that while Benedict sustained head injuries during the school altercation, these injuries were nonlethal. Additionally, handwritten notes suggestive of self-harm were found in Benedict's room.

Following a thorough review, Tulsa County District Attorney Steve Kunzweiler announced that no criminal charges would be filed in connection with the altercation or Benedict's death, describing the incident as "mutual combat."

Benedict's family and friends reported that Benedict had faced bullying related to their gender identity for over a year prior to the incident. This case has intensified discussions about the treatment of LGBTQ+ students in schools and the adequacy of anti-bullying measures. In response, the U.S. Department of Education launched an investigation into Owasso Public Schools' handling of harassment complaints. The investigation concluded that the district was "deliberately indifferent" to reports of sexual harassment, leading to a voluntary resolution agreement to implement comprehensive anti-harassment policies and training.

The death of Nex Benedict has prompted vigils, student walkouts, and calls for systemic reforms to ensure the safety and well-being of LGBTQ+ students in educational environments.

== Campus ==
Owasso High School, located in Owasso, Oklahoma, operates across two campuses to accommodate its large student body of nearly 3,000 students in grades 9 through 12.

== Athletics ==
Owasso High School, located in Owasso, Oklahoma, offers a comprehensive athletics program with teams in 18 sports, including baseball, basketball, cheer, cross country, football, golf, pom, soccer, softball, swimming, tennis, track and field, volleyball, and wrestling.

=== Football ===
The Owasso Rams football team has secured three state championships: a Class 3A co-championship in 1974, and Class 6A-1 titles in 2017 and 2019. Under head coach Bill Blankenship since 2017, the team plays home games at Owasso Stadium on the East Campus. Notable rivalries include the "Battle of the 'Burbs" with Bixby High School and the Folds of Honor Patriot Bowl against Broken Arrow High School.

=== Baseball ===
The Owasso baseball program is renowned, boasting 14 state championships, with 11 titles since 1998. The most recent victory was in the 2022 Class 6A championship, where they defeated Edmond Santa Fe 7–3. Home games are held at Stigall Field on the East Campus.

== Notable alumni ==
- Randy Blake (born 1986), kickboxer
- Dylan Bundy (born 1992), former Major League Baseball (MLB) pitcher; class of 2011
- Aaron Colvin (born 1991), NFL football cornerback with the Houston Texans
- Brian Flynn (born 1990), MLB pitcher
- Keon Hatcher (born 1994), pro football player with the Oakland Raiders
- Jon Kolb (born 1947), football player and strongman
- Pete Kozma (born 1988), MLB shortstop
- Chris McClellan, NFL defensive tackle for the Green Bay Packers
- Shake Milton (born 1996), current basketball guard for Hapoel Jerusalem in the Israeli Basketball Premier League, formerly in the NBA
- Paul Smith, American and Canadian football quarterback
- Braden Webb (born 1995), professional baseball pitcher
