= Liability and student records =

Legislation that dictate liability of educational records

On the subject of liability and student records in the United States there are various pieces of legislation at the local, state, and federal level that dictate the legal liability of any organizations or persons handling student data in an educational context. This article discusses that in the scope of the United States, and in the scope of educational institutions and their proxies in the handling of student data for children under 19.

== Rights of students ==
The student has the same rights and privileges given to parents or guardians, as long as he or she has reached the age of 18 or is enrolled in a postsecondary institution. The student also has the right to inspect confidential records and challenge the accuracy of information contained in the file.

Eligible students are also able to challenge the accuracy of the information contained in their files, under the same guidelines as their parents or legal guardians.

Although FERPA (see below) is the primary Federal law regarding student data privacy, it is also regulated at the Federal level by regulations like COPPA, for online sites directed at children under 13, and HIPAA, for any health-related data. There are many state- and local-level regulations and laws and policies as well, but these are the primary ones at the Federal level.

== Rights of school personnel ==
Teachers, counselors, and administrators, who have a legitimate educational interest in viewing the records may do so. All school personnel with a bonafide need can maintain personal notes on students for personal use. The school district is required to disclose the following information when requested:

- Educational records to comply with judicial orders for state and federal agencies
- Disciplinary proceedings conducted against perpetrators of a crime
- Directory information on students

== Family Educational Rights and Privacy Act ==
The Family Educational Rights and Privacy Act (FERPA) protects confidentiality of student records. This act, commonly referred to as the Buckley Amendment, was enacted by the Congress in 1974 to guarantee parents and students a certain degree of confidentiality and fundamental fairness with respect to the maintenance and use of student records. The law is designed to ensure that certain types of personally identifiable information regarding students will not be released without parental consent or, at the age of 18, the students consent.

The United States Department of Education has a division to specifically support privacy issues with student data: the Privacy Technical Assistance Center (PTAC).

=== Example process ===
Parents and legal guardians in the United States have the right to inspect their child's records. A school official should be present to assist a parent or guardian in interpreting information contained in the files and to respond to questions that may be raised during the examination process.

Parents or legal guardians have the right to challenge the accuracy of any information found in the files regarding their child.

- The school should schedule a conference within a reasonable period of time to discuss the information that may be deemed inaccurate, inappropriate, or misleading.
- If the conference does not result in changes to the satisfaction of parents, they may request a hearing with the Director of Pupil Personnel to appeal the decision reached during the conference.
- A final decision should be reached within 10 days.
- If the parent or legal guardian continues to disagree, they are able to place statements of disagreements in the file with reasons for the disagreement.

== No Child Left Behind Act ==
=== Transfer of school disciplinary records ===
The new provision requires states that receive funds under the Elementary and Secondary Education Act, within two years, to provide an assurance to the Secretary of Education that the state "has a procedure in place to facilitate the transfer of disciplinary records, with respect to suspension or expulsion, by local educational agencies to any private or public elementary school or secondary school for any student who is enrolled or seeks, intends, or is instructed to enroll, on a full- or part-time basis, in the school."

=== Armed forces recruiter access ===
Congress required that any school districts receiving funds under the Elementary and Secondary Education Act provide directory-type information to military recruiters who request it.

=== Student privacy and physical exams ===
The Protection of Pupil Rights Amendment gives parents more rights with regard to the surveying of minor students, the collection of information from students for marketing purposes, and certain nonemergency medical examinations.

== Sanctions for violations ==
"(A) No funds shall be made available under any applicable program to any educational agency or institution which has a policy of denying, or which effectively prevents, the parents of students who are or have been in attendance at a school of such agency or at such institution, as the case may be, the right to inspect and review the education records of their children. If any material or document in the education record of a student includes information on more than one student, the parents of one of such students shall have the right to inspect and review only such part of such material or document as relates to such student or to be informed of the specific information contained in such part of such material. Each educational agency or institution shall establish appropriate procedures for the granting of a request by parents for access to the education records of their children within a reasonable period of time, but in no case more than forty-five days after the request has been made."

== Privacy and data mining concerns ==
Under the Obama Administration, over 1 billion dollars were spent in developing databases designed for improving the educational system, including P-20 longitudinal data systems. Although these databases contain extensive personally identifiable information, much of this information is "not kept in a format that allows officials to easily extract the complete file on any one child." As of June 2014, parents concerned about student privacy and data mining of student information have begun to organize opposition at the state level:

We don't know what they're tracking and we don't know what the implications are going to be for these children in the future ... Going for jobs in the future, trying to get into college — we're in uncharted territory and we just don't know the implication it's going to have for the children. We need to slow down.
