= Limestone, Oklahoma =

- CDP
- Location within the state of Oklahoma
- Coordinates: 36°18′52″N 95°44′52″W
- Country: United States
- State: Oklahoma
- County: Rogers

Area
  - Total: 3.15 sq mi (8.15 km^{2})
  - Land: 3.15 sq mi (8.15 km^{2})
  - Water: 0 sq mi (0.00 km^{2})
- Elevation: 12 ft (3.7 m)

Population (2020)
  - Total: 804
  - Density: 255.7/sq mi (98.71/km^{2})
- Time zone: UTC-6 (Central (CST))
  - Summer (DST): UTC-5 (CDT)
- Postal code: 74021
- FIPS code: 40-43057
- GNIS feature ID: 2408608

Limestone is a census-designated place (CDP) in Rogers County, Oklahoma, United States, at an elevation of 705 feet (214.88 meters). It is located less than 10 miles west of Claremore, Oklahoma on Oklahoma State Highway 20. The population was 753 as of July 2020.

== Geography ==
According to the United States Census Bureau, the CDP has a total area of 3.2 square miles (8.3 km^{2}), all land. It lies between Owasso, Collinsville, and Claremore.

== Demographics ==
Historical population
Census	Pop.	Note	%±
2000	745		—
2010	629		−15.6%
2020	804		27.8%
U.S. Decennial Census

=== 2020 census ===
As of the 2020 census, Limestone had a population of 804. The median age was 44.4 years. 20.8% of residents were under the age of 18 and 19.7% of residents were 65 years of age or older. For every 100 females there were 100.0 males, and for every 100 females age 18 and over there were 97.8 males age 18 and over.

0.0% of residents lived in urban areas, while 100.0% lived in rural areas.

There were 279 households in Limestone, of which 29.0% had children under the age of 18 living in them. Of all households, 71.7% were married-couple households, 8.2% were households with a male householder and no spouse or partner present, and 16.5% were households with a female householder and no spouse or partner present. About 17.6% of all households were made up of individuals and 9.7% had someone living alone who was 65 years of age or older.

There were 302 housing units, of which 7.6% were vacant. The homeowner vacancy rate was 2.6% and the rental vacancy rate was 17.4%.

Racial composition as of the 2020 census
Race	Number	Percent
White	546	67.9%
Black or African American	12	1.5%
American Indian and Alaska Native	63	7.8%
Asian	59	7.3%
Native Hawaiian and Other Pacific Islander	0	0.0%
Some other race	15	1.9%
Two or more races	109	13.6%
Hispanic or Latino (of any race)	50	6.2%

=== 2000 census ===
As of the census of 2000, there were 745 people, 252 households, and 214 families residing in the CDP. The population density was 236.1 inhabitants per square mile (91.2/km^{2}). There were 258 housing units at an average density of 81.8 per square mile (31.6/km^{2}). The racial makeup of the CDP was 85.23% White, 4.97% Native American, 0.54% Asian, 1.07% from other races, and 8.19% from two or more races. Hispanic or Latino of any race were 1.34% of the population.

There were 252 households, out of which 40.5% had children under the age of 18 living with them, 76.2% were married couples living together, 6.0% had a female householder with no husband present, and 14.7% were non-families. 11.5% of all households were made up of individuals, and 3.6% had someone living alone who was 65 years of age or older. The average household size was 2.96 and the average family size was 3.22.

In the CDP, the population was spread out, with 28.6% under the age of 18, 5.8% from 18 to 24, 28.5% from 25 to 44, 28.3% from 45 to 64, and 8.9% who were 65 years of age or older. The median age was 38 years. For every 100 females, there were 103.6 males. For every 100 females age 18 and over, there were 101.5 males.

The median income for a household in the CDP was $51,750, and the median income for a family was $56,625. Males had a median income of $56,042 versus $30,089 for females. The per capita income for the CDP was $21,035. About 8.8% of families and 5.2% of the population were below the poverty line, including none of those under age 18 and 39.4% of those age 65 or over.

== Education ==
It is in the Owasso Public Schools school district, which operates Owasso High School.
