= Owasso Public Schools =

Public school district in Oklahoma, United States

Address
- 1501 North Ash Street Owasso, Oklahoma; United States

District information
- Grades: K-12
- Superintendent: Dr. Margaret Coates

Students and staff
- Students: ~9,800

Other information
- Website: Official website

Owasso Public Schools is a school district that serves Owasso, Oklahoma. The district consists of 13 academic campuses, including Owasso High School. As of 2024, the district has 9,800 students enrolled The superintendent of the district is Dr. Margaret Coates. The district is known for its involvement in Owasso Independent School District v. Falvo, a case that reached the US Supreme Court.

== Area ==
Most of the district is in Tulsa County, where it includes that county's portion of Owasso and a small section of Tulsa. It extends into Rogers County, where it includes all of that county's portion of Broken Arrow, a part of that county's part of Owasso, as well as Limestone and a small portion of Valley Park.

== Schools ==
Owasso Public Schools has 13 different educational campuses, all located in Owasso, Oklahoma. There are 11 elementary school campuses, 3 middle schools, and 2 high school campuses. Among the high school campuses is the Ram Academy, a program aimed at preventing students from dropping out of high school. The program was recognized in 2015 by the National Dropout Prevention Network for its work in helping at-risk youth.

=== Elementary schools ===
- Ator Elementary
- Bailey Elementary
- Barnes Elementary
- Hodson Elementary
- Mills Elementary
- Morrow Elementary
- Northeast Elementary
- Smith Elementary
- Stone Canyon Elementary

=== Middle schools ===
- Sixth Grade Center
- Seventh Grade Center
- Eighth Grade Center

=== High schools ===
- Owasso High School
- Ram Academy

== Owasso Independent School District v. Falvo ==
In 2002, a parent sued the school district alleging that peer grading is a violation of the Family Educational Rights and Privacy Act of 1974 (FERPA). FERPA stipulates that federal funds can be withheld from schools that disclose educational records without parental consent. The case made its way to the Supreme Court of the United States, which unanimously agreed that peer grading is not a violation of FERPA.
