= Braden Webb =

American baseball player (born 1995)

Gastonia Ghost Peppers – No. 25
- Pitcher
- Born: April 25, 1995 (age 31); Owasso, Oklahoma, U.S.
- Bats: Right Throws: Right
- Stats at Baseball Reference

Braden Allen Webb (born April 25, 1995) is an American professional baseball pitcher for the Gastonia Ghost Peppers of the Atlantic League of Professional Baseball. He was drafted by the Milwaukee Brewers in the 3rd round of the 2016 Major League Baseball draft.

== Amateur career ==
Webb attended Owasso High School in Owasso, Oklahoma. He played for the school's baseball team and committed to attend the University of South Carolina (USC) to play college baseball for the South Carolina Gamecocks. He was also considered a top prospect in the 2014 Major League Baseball draft. Owasso's baseball team went undefeated in 2013, his junior year, and Webb had a 1.98 earned run average (ERA).

In 2014, his senior year, Webb began the baseball season with two no-hitters, but was injured in his third start and required Tommy John surgery. He went unselected in the 2014 draft, but USC followed through with his college scholarship. He missed the rest of the 2014 season and all of 2015 while recovering. The Cleveland Indians selected Webb in the 38th round, with the 1,144th overall selection, of the 2015 MLB draft, but Webb did not sign, and pitched for the Gamecocks in 2016. He had a 10–6 win–loss record, a 3.09 ERA, and 128 strikeouts in 102 innings pitched. The National Collegiate Baseball Writers Association named him their Freshman of the Year.

== Professional career ==
=== Milwaukee Brewers ===
The Milwaukee Brewers selected Webb in the third round, with the 82nd overall selection, of the 2016 MLB draft. He signed with Milwaukee. He pitched for the Wisconsin Timber Rattlers of the Single–A Midwest League in 2017, going 6-7 with a 4.36 ERA 22 games (13 starts). He began the 2018 season with the Carolina Mudcats of the High–A Carolina League, and was promoted to the Biloxi Shuckers of the Double–A Southern League in August. In 25 games (24 starts) between the two clubs, he compiled a 6-8 record with a 3.80 ERA.

In 2019, Webb played for four different Brewers affiliates, appearing in 21 games (20 starts) and pitching to a 2-8 record and 4.76 ERA with 61 strikeouts in 64 1/3 innings pitched. Webb did not play in a game in 2020 due to the cancellation of the minor league season because of the COVID-19 pandemic. For the 2021 season, he spent the year with Double-A Biloxi working as a reliever. In 41 games, he pitched to a 4-7 record and 4.59 ERA with 67 strikeouts in 49.0 innings of work.

He was released by the Brewers organization on March 22, 2022.

=== Algodoneros de Unión Laguna ===
On February 17, 2023, Webb signed with the Algodoneros de Unión Laguna of the Mexican League. In 19 starts for the team, he posted a 7–5 record and 4.98 ERA with 93 strikeouts across 108 1/3 innings pitched.

Webb made 18 starts for the Algodoneros in 2024, compiling a 7–9 record and 4.79 ERA with 78 strikeouts over 82 2/3 innings of work. He was released by the team on April 18, 2025.

=== Caliente de Durango ===
On April 19, 2025, Webb signed with the Caliente de Durango of the Mexican League. In nine appearances for Durango, he recorded a 3.72 ERA with 12 strikeouts over 9 2/3 innings of work. Webb was released by the Caliente on July 11.

=== Dorados de Chihuahua ===
On April 14, 2026, Webb signed with the Dorados de Chihuahua of the Mexican League. In 28 appearances for the Dorados, he posted a 1–2 record with a 4.82 ERA, 28 strikeouts, and four saves across 28 innings pitched. On June 23, Webb was waived by Chihuahua.

=== Gastonia Ghost Peppers ===
On June 24, 2026, Webb was claimed off waivers by the Conspiradores de Querétaro of the Mexican League. However, on July 1, his contract was transferred to the Gastonia Ghost Peppers of the Atlantic League of Professional Baseball.
