= Brnović =

Brnović or Brnovich (Serbian: Брновић) is a surname. Notable people with the surname include:

- Bojan Brnović (born 1979), Montenegrin footballer
- Branko Brnović (born 1967), retired Montenegrin professional footballer
- Dragoljub Brnović (born 1963), former Montenegrin football player
- Kyle Brnovich (born 1997), American baseball player
- Mark Brnovich (1966–2026), American lawyer and politician
- Miloš Brnović (born 2000), Montenegrin football player
- Nenad Brnović (born 1980), Montenegrin footballer
- Susan Brnovich (born 1968), American judge
- Tatjana Brnović (born 1998), Montenegrin handball player
