= LeRoy Rooker =

American government official

LeRoy S. Rooker
- Citizenship: American
- Occupation: government official
- Years active: 1988-present
- Employers: United States Department of Education; American Association of Collegiate Registrars and Admissions Officers
- Known for: implementing the Family Educational Rights and Privacy Act

LeRoy S. Rooker was the director of the United States Department of Education's Family Policy Compliance Office (FPCO) from 1988 to 2009, where he oversaw implementation of the Family Educational Rights and Privacy Act (FERPA) and the Protection of Pupil Rights Amendment (PPRA). Both programs are laws and policies designed to help students' rights.

After leaving his position at the FPCO, Rooker joined the American Association of Collegiate Registrars and Admissions Officers (AACRAO) as a Senior Fellow. As of January 2024, he is still serving in that capacity, and is often referred to as "the FERPA Professor".

Rooks is considered the nation's leading expert on FERPA.
