= P-20 longitudinal data systems =

P-20 longitudinal data systems are state-level educational databases in the United States created to "capture, study and use student data from preschool into future workforces.”

== Description ==
These databases are developed on different models in different states.

Twelve elements are required:

- A special pointer for every student that does not give permission to a student to be individually identified (except by giving special permission by federal and state law);
- The school enrollment history, demographic traits and program participation record of every student;
- Information on when a student enrolls, transfers, drops out, or graduates from a school;
- Students' scores on tests required by the Elementary and Secondary Education Act;
- Information on students who are not tested, by grade and subject;
- Students' scores on tests measuring whether they're ready for college;
- A way to identify teachers and to match teachers to their students;
- Information from students' transcripts, specifically courses taken and grades earned;
- Data on students' success in college, including whether they enrolled in remedial courses;
- Data on whether K-12 students are prepared to succeed in college;
- A system of auditing data for quality, validity, and reliability;
- The ability to share data from preschool through post-secondary education data systems.

== Privacy and data mining concerns ==
Under the Obama Administration, over 1 billion dollars were spent developing databases designed for improving the educational system, including P-20 longitudinal data systems. Although these databases do contain extensive personally identifiable information, much of this information is "not kept in a format that allows officials to easily extract the complete file on a specific child." As of June 2014, parents started protesting at the state level against the data mining being done on student's privacy & information, saying:

"We don't know what they're tracking, and we don't know what the implications are going to be for these children in the future... Going for jobs in the future, trying to get into college — we're in uncharted territory and we just don't know the implication it's going to have for the children. We need to slow down."

== See also ==
- Longitudinal study
- Liability and Student Records
- Common Education Data Standards
- Data Quality Campaign
