= Isaac Mattson =

American baseball player (born 1995)

Seattle Mariners
- Pitcher
- Born: July 14, 1995 (age 31); Erie, Pennsylvania, U.S.
- Bats: Right Throws: Right

MLB debut
- May 7, 2021, for the Baltimore Orioles

MLB statistics (through 2026 season)
- Win–loss record: 3–3
- Earned run average: 3.94
- Strikeouts: 90
- Stats at Baseball Reference

Teams
- Baltimore Orioles (2021); Pittsburgh Pirates (2024–2026)

Isaac Gerald Mattson (born July 14, 1995) is an American professional baseball pitcher for the Seattle Mariners of Major League Baseball (MLB). He has previously played in MLB for the Baltimore Orioles and Pittsburgh Pirates.

== Amateur career ==
Mattson attended Harbor Creek High School in Harborcreek, Pennsylvania, where he played both baseball and basketball. In 2014, his senior year, he went 6–0 with a 0.67 earned run average (ERA) while batting .531. He was not selected out of high school in the 2014 Major League Baseball draft and played college baseball for the Pittsburgh Panthers.

In 2015, as a freshman at Pittsburgh, Mattson appeared in 22 games, going 1–1 with a 3.82 ERA. In 2016, his sophomore season, he pitched 34 innings in relief, compiling a 2–0 record with a 3.71 ERA. After his sophomore year, he played for the Chatham Anglers of the Cape Cod Baseball League and was named an All-Star. In 2017, as a junior, he pitched 31 innings as a reliever, going 1–0 with a 2.87 ERA, striking out 41.

== Professional career ==
=== Los Angeles Angels ===
Mattson was selected by the Los Angeles Angels in the 19th round of the 2017 Major League Baseball draft. Mattson made his professional debut with the Arizona League Angels before he was promoted to the Orem Owlz, where he was named an All-Star. In 31 1/3 innings pitched between the two clubs, he went 1–0 with a 1.44 ERA. In 2018, Mattson played for the Burlington Bees and the Inland Empire 66ers, going 7–4 with a 3.82 ERA in 25 games (11 starts). In 2019, he began the year with the 66ers before he was promoted to the Mobile BayBears in May. In August, he was promoted to the Salt Lake Bees. Over 37 relief appearances between the three clubs, Mattson had a 6–3 record with a 2.33 ERA, striking out 110 over 73 1/3 innings. He was selected to play in the Arizona Fall League for the Mesa Solar Sox following the season.

=== Baltimore Orioles ===
On December 4, 2019, Mattson, Zach Peek, Kyle Bradish, and Kyle Brnovich were traded to the Baltimore Orioles for Dylan Bundy. He did not play a minor league game in 2020 due to the cancellation of the minor league season caused by the COVID-19 pandemic. On November 20, 2020, the Orioles added Mattson to their 40-man roster.

Mattson began the 2021 season with the Norfolk Tides. On May 3, he was promoted to the major leagues for the first time. Mattson made his major league debut on May 7, pitching 2/3 of an inning and allowing a run on a Marwin González double. Mattson was optioned back to Norfolk the following day. On June 30, the Orioles recalled Mattson. He recorded his first MLB strikeout on July 3, striking out Los Angeles Angels infielder David Fletcher. Over four appearances for the Orioles in 2021, Matson posted a 6.23 ERA with three strikeouts.

On April 8, 2022, Mattson was outrighted to Norfolk. He made 19 relief appearances for Norfolk and had a 6.62 ERA. On July 18, the Orioles released Mattson.

=== Washington Wild Things ===
On August 6, 2022, Mattson signed with the Washington Wild Things of the Frontier League. He made 12 appearances for Washington, recording a 2.40 ERA with 23 strikeouts in 15 innings pitched. On December 5, Mattson was released by the Wild Things after having his contract option declined.

=== Southern Maryland Blue Crabs ===
On March 31, 2023, Mattson signed with the Southern Maryland Blue Crabs of the Atlantic League of Professional Baseball. In 18 appearances for the Blue Crabs, Mattson logged a 3.32 ERA with 24 strikeouts and three saves in 19 innings pitched.

=== Minnesota Twins ===
On June 22, 2023, Mattson signed a minor league contract with the Minnesota Twins organization. In 21 appearances for the Double–A Wichita Wind Surge, he registered a 3.62 ERA with 42 strikeouts across 32 1/3 innings of work. Mattson elected free agency following the season on November 6.

=== Pittsburgh Pirates ===
On December 11, 2023, Mattson signed a minor league contract with the Pittsburgh Pirates. He began 2024 with the Double–A Altoona Curve, and was later promoted to the Triple–A Indianapolis Indians, compiling a 7–2 record and 3.17 ERA with 89 strikeouts over 37 total games. On September 19, 2024, the Pirates selected Mattson's contract, adding him to their active roster. In three games for Pittsburgh, he posted a 5.06 ERA with six strikeouts over 5 1/3 innings pitched. On November 4, Mattson was removed from the 40-man roster and sent outright to Indianapolis. He elected free agency the same day.

On November 18, 2024, Mattson re–signed with the Pirates on a minor league contract. He began the 2025 season with Indianapolis, posting a 2.50 ERA with 22 strikeouts and four saves in his first 16 outings. On May 20, 2025, the Pirates selected Mattson's contract, adding him to their active roster. On June 7, Mattson earned his first career win after pitching a scoreless seventh inning against the Philadelphia Phillies. Mattson made 44 relief appearances for the Pirates and went 3–3 with a 2.45 ERA and 45 strikeouts over 47 2/3 innings.

In 2026, Mattson was named to Pittsburgh's Opening Day roster, the first of his MLB career. On May 20, he was optioned to Indianapolis. Mattson was recalled by Pittsburgh and optioned to Indianapolis multiple times during the season. On September 8, he was placed on the injured list with right hip impingement, and missed the remainder of the season. Mattson made 38 relief appearances for Pittsburgh during the season and ended with a 5.35 ERA and 36 strikeouts over 38 2/3 innings pitched. With Indianapolis, he had a 1.33 ERA across 15 games.

=== Seattle Mariners ===
On November 2, 2026, Mattson was claimed off of waivers by the Seattle Mariners.

== Personal life ==
Mattson was raised with seven siblings. His mother, Debra, died by suicide in July 2021. Mattson and his wife married in November 2022. Their first child was born in February 2025.

Mattson recorded a message to NASA's Artemis II crew in 2026.
