= Dylan Bundy =

American baseball player (born 1992)

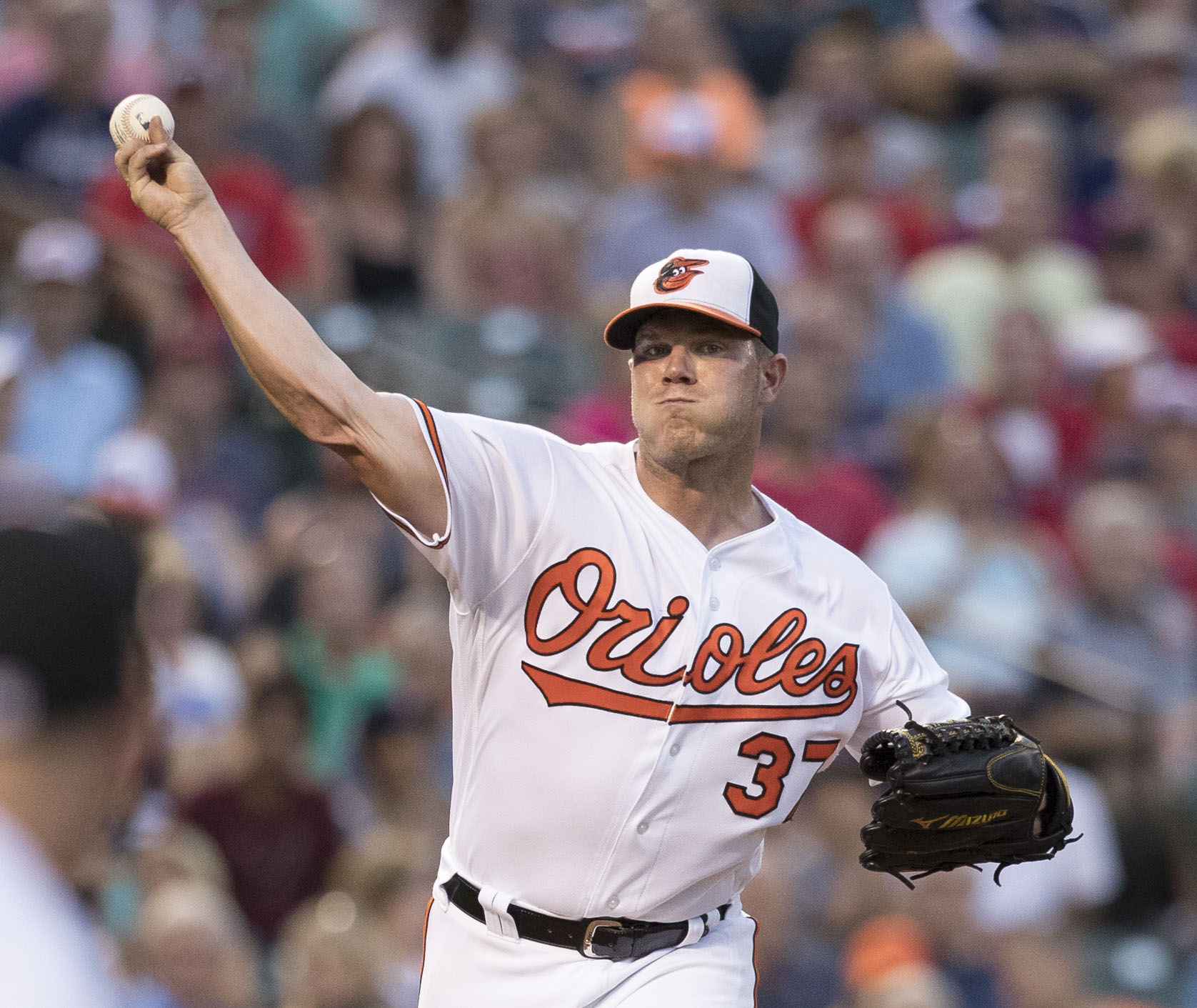
- Bundy with the Baltimore Orioles in 2016
- Pitcher
- Born: November 15, 1992 (age 33); Tulsa, Oklahoma, U.S.
- Batted: Switch Threw: Right

MLB debut
- September 23, 2012, for the Baltimore Orioles

Last MLB appearance
- October 1, 2022, for the Minnesota Twins

MLB statistics
- Win–loss record: 54–65
- Earned run average: 4.74
- Strikeouts: 852
- Stats at Baseball Reference

Teams
- Baltimore Orioles (2012, 2016–2019); Los Angeles Angels (2020–2021); Minnesota Twins (2022)

Dylan Matthew Bundy (born November 15, 1992) is an American former professional baseball pitcher. He played in Major League Baseball (MLB) for the Baltimore Orioles, Los Angeles Angels and Minnesota Twins.

The Orioles selected Bundy with the fourth overall pick in the 2011 MLB draft. He made his MLB debut in 2012, but did not return to the majors until 2016 due to injuries. He pitched for Baltimore through 2019 and was traded to the Angels on December 4, 2019.

== Early years ==
Bundy attended Owasso High School in Owasso, Oklahoma. As a senior, he had a 0.25 earned run average (ERA) and 158 strikeouts in 71 innings pitched. He was the 2011 Gatorade National Baseball Player of the Year, Baseball America High School Player of the Year, the USA Today National Player of the Year, 2011 Louisville Slugger Player of the Year, 2011 National High School Coaches Association Baseball Player of the Year and the 2011 National High School Baseball Coaches Association Player of the Year.

Bundy is the only player to win the Gatorade State player of the year in any sport three times (2009, 2010, 2011). He went on in 2011 to become the first baseball player to win the Gatorade Athlete of the Year award.

Bundy's older brother, Bobby attended Sperry High School, where he too was a pitcher. He was drafted by the Orioles in the 2008 Major League Baseball draft and has played minor league baseball for nine seasons.

== Professional career ==
=== Baltimore Orioles ===
The Baltimore Orioles selected Bundy in the first round, with the fourth overall pick, in the 2011 Major League Baseball draft. On August 15, 2011, he signed a major league contract with the Baltimore Orioles, who added him to their 40-man roster.

Bundy made his professional debut on April 6, 2012, with the Single-A Delmarva Shorebirds pitching against the Asheville Tourists. He allowed no hits over three innings while striking out six batters. His fastball was reported to reach 97–98 miles per hour (156–158 km/h) in the game. In 30 innings pitched with Delmarva, Bundy maintained an ERA of 0.00 with 40 strikeouts, two walks and two unearned runs. Hitters went 5 for 94 against him.

Bundy was promoted to the high Class A Frederick Keys on May 23, 2012 where he posted a 6–3 record with a 2.84 ERA. He was named to appear in the 2012 All-Star Futures Game.

Bundy was promoted to the Bowie Baysox on August 14, 2012, and he was then promoted to the Baltimore Orioles on September 19, 2012. On September 23, Bundy made his MLB debut against the Boston Red Sox in a relief appearance. He recorded two outs. He appeared once more during the season on September 25 against the Blue Jays, pitching one inning, allowing one hit and walk.

On June 27, 2013, he underwent Tommy John surgery. He was expected to miss at least 12 months. In January 2014, Bundy had circled June 28, 2014—one year and one day after his Tommy John surgery—as the target date for his return.

On July 29, 2015, Bundy was shut down indefinitely with calcification in the back area of his shoulder. At the time of his shutdown, there was no timetable for his return. On August 26, it was announced that he would pitch in an instructional league, along with fellow Orioles pitcher Hunter Harvey, in September 2015.

Out of minor league options in 2016, Bundy was impressive in spring training and made the Orioles Opening Day roster. He made his season debut on April 7, 2016; this appearance came 1,290 days after the last time Bundy had played in a Major League game. Bundy pitched an inning against the Minnesota Twins, allowing only one hit, while earning a hold.

At the All-Star break, Bundy had appeared in 22 games out of the bullpen, pitching to a 3.08 ERA in 38.0 innings. He went 2–1 and collected 32 strikeouts. After the All-star break, Bundy was inserted into a struggling Orioles rotation to help find stability. Bundy had a rocky first start, as he pitched 3 1/3 while giving up four runs all via the home run. Bundy had a much better start the second time around against the Cleveland Indians, going 5 innings while allowing one unearned run. On July 27, against the Colorado Rockies, Bundy took a perfect game into the sixth inning with one out before allowing a walk and then a home run to former Oriole Nick Hundley. In his very next start against the Texas Rangers, Bundy turned in his best performance, throwing 7 innings of one-hit baseball. He carried a no-hitter through 5 2/3 innings before giving up a single.

Bundy finished his first full year in the majors, having pitched in 36 games (14 starts), pitching to a 4.02 ERA while going 10–6 and striking out 104 batters. He led the major leagues in steals of home allowed, with two.

In 2017, Bundy was slotted as the Orioles number two starter after injury to staff ace Chris Tillman. In his first start of the season, Bundy tossed seven innings, giving up only one hit while striking out eight batters to earn his first victory of the season. On May 18, Bundy's consecutive quality start streak of 8 to start the season came to an end. Bundy struggled in the month of June and July, and finished the first half with an ERA of 4.33 in 108 innings of work. In his first start back from the All-Star break, Bundy set a new career-high for innings pitched in a season. On August 1, he had the longest outing of his career, going eight innings against the Kansas City Royals, allowing one unearned run in the Orioles 7–2 victory.

On August 29, Bundy tossed his first career complete game shutout against the Mariners. He allowed just one hit, a bunt single in the 4th inning, while striking out 12 batters and only walking two.

Bundy started off the 2018 MLB season strong by posting a 1.42 ERA through 5 starts.

On May 8, 2018, Bundy set an MLB record against the Kansas City Royals by allowing four home runs without recording a single out. Bundy gave up the home runs to Jorge Soler, Mike Moustakas, Salvador Perez and Alex Gordon. In total, Bundy gave up 5 hits, 7 runs, and 2 walks before being pulled in the first inning. He was placed on the disabled list on June 26 with an ankle injury.

On May 24, 2018, Bundy tossed his second career complete game against the Chicago White Sox. He allowed two hits, striking out a career high 14 batters.

Bundy ended the season leading the majors in home runs allowed, serving up 41 in 171 1/3 innings. For the 2018 season, he also led the majors in giving up the most home runs per nine innings (2.15). He finished with a record of 8–16 in 31 starts, with a 5.45 ERA.

Bundy was placed on the disabled list on July 13, 2019, with right knee tendinitis. He was 4–11 with an ERA of 5.28 through 18 starts. He ended the season starting 30 games, pitching in 161 2/3 innings with 162 strikeouts. Bundy's record was 7–14.

=== Los Angeles Angels ===
On December 4, 2019, Bundy was traded to the Los Angeles Angels in exchange for pitchers Isaac Mattson, Zach Peek, Kyle Bradish and Kyle Brnovich.

On July 25, 2020, Bundy made his Angels debut against the Oakland Athletics. He pitched 6 2/3 innings, striking out 7 batters and allowing 1 run. On August 6, 2020, Bundy threw his third-ever complete game against the Seattle Mariners. He allowed 1 run and 4 hits, striking out 10 batters.

During the 2020 season, Bundy posted a 6–3 record with a 3.29 ERA and 72 strikeouts in 65 2/3 innings. He finished ninth in the voting for the Cy Young Award.

Bundy was named the Angels' starting pitcher for Opening Day 2021. In the 4–3 no-decision win against the Chicago White Sox, Bundy pitched six innings, striking out six batters and allowing three runs. On June 28, 2021, in a game against the New York Yankees, Bundy suffered a bout of heat exhaustion and vomited on the field. He had pitched 1 2/3 innings, allowing two runs. After going 1–7 with a 6.78 ERA in his first 14 starts, Bundy was replaced in the rotation by José Suárez and was moved to the bullpen on June 30. On July 1, he became the second established member of the Angels starting rotation to be moved into the bullpen during the season, joining José Quintana.

=== Minnesota Twins ===
On December 1, 2021, the Minnesota Twins signed Bundy to a one-year contract with a club option for the 2023 season. Bundy made 29 starts for Minnesota in 2022, posting a 8–8 record and 4.89 ERA with 94 strikeouts in 140 innings pitched. On November 7, 2022, the Twins declined the option on his 2023 season, making him a free agent.

=== New York Mets ===
On March 25, 2023, Bundy signed a minor league contract with the New York Mets organization. In six starts for the Triple–A Syracuse Mets, he struggled to a 10.08 ERA with 21 strikeouts in 25 innings of work. On July 24, he was released by the Mets.

In January 2024, Bundy retired and became a real estate agent in his hometown.

== Pitching style ==
Bundy throws four-seam, two-seam and cut-fastballs as well as two off-speed pitches—a curveball and a changeup. His four-seamer has touched 100 mph as a high school player. After having elbow surgery, his fastball velocity fell in to the 93–94 mph range. Bundy uses his cutter primarily against left-handed batters in an attempt to overpower them on the inner-half of the strikezone. He also throws a curveball at 75–77 mph that rated as one of the best in the Orioles system in 2012, as well as a changeup.

== Personal life ==
Bundy and his wife, Caitlin, married in November 2020.
