= Education Data Exchange Network =

The Education Data Exchange Network (EDEN) is an automated system designed to support data transfer among state and local education agencies and the United States Department of Education (ED). EDEN began as a State Data Network pilot test among Oregon, Nebraska and ED in 1998. At the time all reports on federal grant programs were written and stored in paper file cabinets in ED program offices, although many of those reports contained similar, and often inconsistent, information. States, particularly the Council of Chief State School Officers and their data managers, called on ED to automate and streamline the process. Based on the success of the pilot test, the [Office of Management and Budget] (OMB) required ED to institute a Performance-Based Data Management Initiative (PBDMI) in 2000. PBDMI was designed to gather statistics from each state such as school populations within subgroups (race, gender, etc.), graduation rates, school spending, and federal program performance. This initiative resulted in EDEN. It was designed to:

- Improve the accuracy, timeliness, and utility of information collected to inform educational management, budget and policy decisions.
- Increase the focus on outcomes and accountability.
- Reduce the education reporting burden by streamlining the data collection process and eliminating redundancy across ED programs.
- Create a partnership between ED and state and local education agencies to improve data quality and management through common data standards and collaborative systems planning.

By 2004, all states participated in EDEN. In 2005 ED began to require that all elementary and secondary level federal reports, including those to the National Center for Education Statistics (NCES) be submitted through EDEN. The ED Office of the Inspector General and the General Accounting Office published reports critical of the program's management.[1] In March 2005, the Secretary of Education, Margaret Spellings abolished the office administering EDEN and removed all managers from managerial positions.[2] PBDMI and EDEN data gathering is complicated by the fact that no data sent to federal agencies may contain private data about an individual student that would violate the FERPA guidelines. So a state agency cannot just send a list of students and their test scores. A reporting agency can only send summary subgroup data for subgroup populations above a small number such as five. EDEN data sets consist of three types:

- Statewide data often called State Education Agencies (SEA)
- District or regional data Local Education Agencies (LEA)
- School-specific data

There are XML representations of EDEN files as well as XML schemas to validate these files available from the ed.gov file specifications site (www2.ed.gov/about/inits/ed/edfacts/eden/non-xml/c163-8-0.doc). EDEN program data is now (2014) aggregated in the EDFACTS system for all program offices, senior management, and federal reporting. EDEN data collection is now operated out of the NCES.

EDEN received many commendations including from CCSSO, the Council for Excellence in Government, and the Office of Management and Budget in the President's 2005 Budget submission, EDEN was selected as a model project for in-depth review in a 2005 presidential transition Guide for Federal Leaders and Managers. A General Accounting Office report commended the initiative and recommended increased support for it from ED administration, including making the program mandatory and including NCES reports.
