= Kyle Bradish =

American baseball player (born 1996)

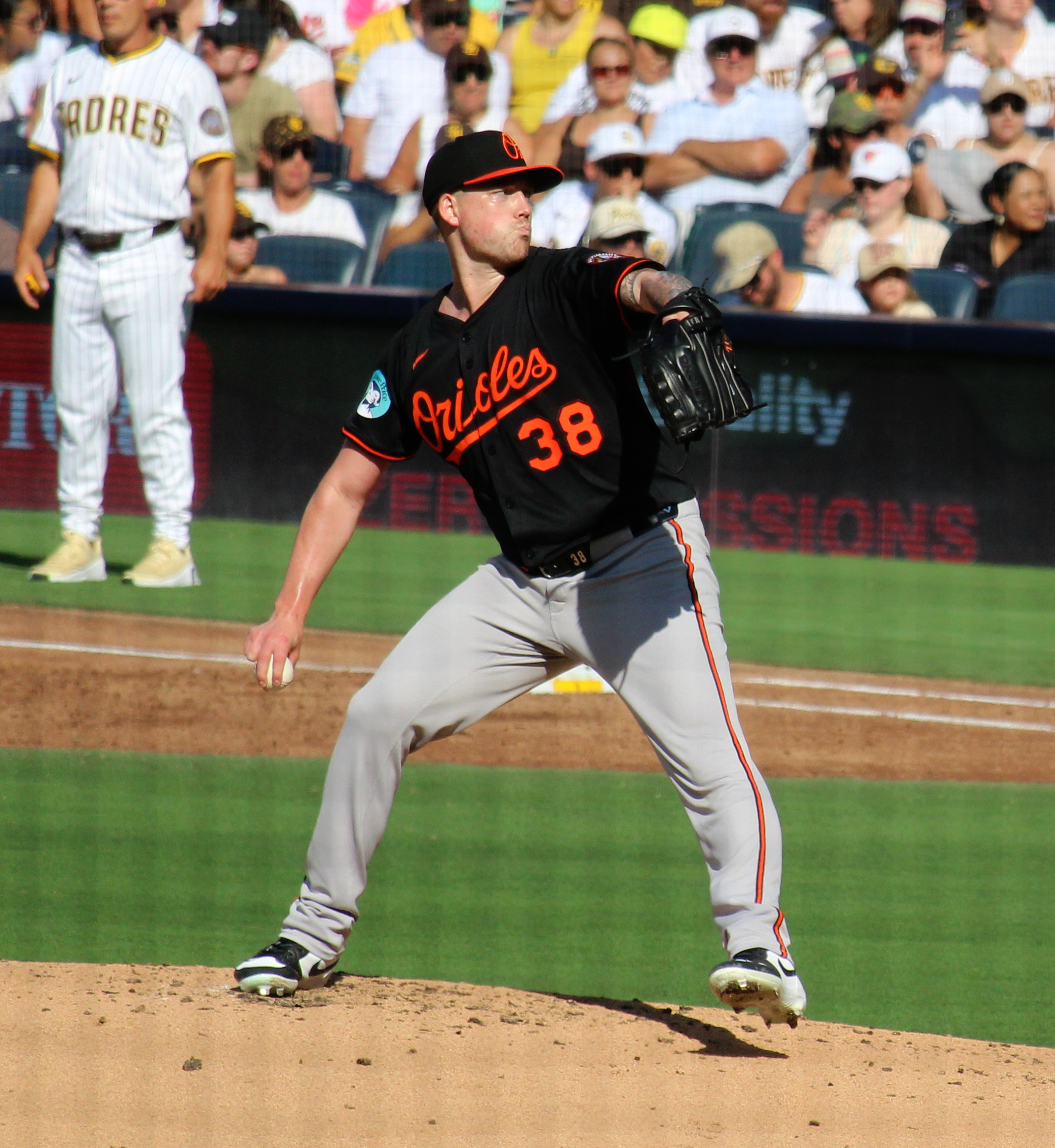
- Bradish with the Baltimore Orioles in 2025

Baltimore Orioles – No. 38
- Pitcher
- Born: September 12, 1996 (age 30); Peoria, Arizona, U.S.
- Bats: Right Throws: Right

MLB debut
- April 29, 2022, for the Baltimore Orioles

MLB statistics (through 2026 season)
- Win–loss record: 26–29
- Earned run average: 3.67
- Strikeouts: 521
- Stats at Baseball Reference

Teams
- Baltimore Orioles (2022–present)

Kyle Edward Bradish (born September 12, 1996) is an American professional baseball pitcher for the Baltimore Orioles of Major League Baseball (MLB). He made his MLB debut in 2022.

== Amateur career ==
Bradish attended Millennium High School in Goodyear, Arizona. In 2015, his senior year, he batted .308 while striking out 78 batters over 43 1/3 innings. He was not selected in the 2015 Major League Baseball draft and enrolled at New Mexico State University where he played college baseball for the New Mexico State Aggies.

As a freshman at New Mexico State in 2016, Bradish appeared in 17 games (15 starts) in which he compiled an 8–3 record with a 4.67 ERA, striking out a team-high 82 batters over 86 2/3 innings. In 2017, his sophomore season, he went 8–2 with a 3.20 ERA over 15 games (14 starts), and was named to the Western Athletic Conference First-Team. That summer, he played for the Falmouth Commodores of the Cape Cod Baseball League, and was named an All-Star. As a junior in 2018, he went 9–3 with a 2.67 ERA over 17 starts, and was named to the All-WAC Team for the second straight season.

== Professional career ==
=== Los Angeles Angels ===
After his junior year at New Mexico State, the Los Angeles Angels selected Bradish in the fourth round of the 2018 Major League Baseball draft. He signed with the Angels and made his professional debut in 2019 with the Inland Empire 66ers of the High–A California League, going 6–7 with a 4.28 ERA over 24 games (18 starts), earning All-Star honors.

=== Baltimore Orioles ===
On December 4, 2019, the Angels traded Bradish, Zach Peek, Isaac Mattson, and Kyle Brnovich to the Baltimore Orioles in exchange for Dylan Bundy. Bradish did not play in a game in 2020 due to the cancellation of the minor league season because of the COVID-19 pandemic. To begin the 2021 season, he was assigned to the Bowie Baysox of the Double-A Northeast. After three starts and 13 2/3 scoreless innings, he was promoted to the Norfolk Tides of the Triple-A East. Over 21 games (19 starts) with Norfolk, Bradish went 5–5 with a 4.26 ERA and 105 strikeouts over 86 2/3 innings.

On November 19, 2021, the Orioles selected Bradish's contract and added him to their 40-man roster in order to protect him from the Rule 5 draft. He returned to Norfolk to open the 2022 season. On April 29, 2022, the Orioles promoted Bradish to the majors to make his MLB debut that night as the starting pitcher versus the Boston Red Sox. Bradish allowed two earned runs over six innings pitched while striking out two batters and walking one in his debut. On May 10, Bradish earned his first career win against the St. Louis Cardinals, at one point retiring 11 consecutive batters.

On September 22, 2022, Bradish allowed just two hits to the Houston Astros over 8 2/3 innings to lead an Orioles' shutout of the Astros, 2–0. He struck out ten in the longest outing to-date of his professional career. He finished the 2022 season with a 4–7 record and a 4.90 ERA which was 3.28 after the All-Star break.

Bradish began the 2023 season as the Orioles number four pitcher in the rotation. He was pulled after only 1 2/3 innings in his first start of the season after taking a line drive off his foot. He would return to the Orioles rotation 16 days later, after a stint on the 15-Day IL with a right foot contusion. He pitched six scoreless innings against the Washington Nationals, striking out six batters and earning his first win of the season. Bradish finished the regular season with a 12–7 record in 30 starts, pitching 168 2/3 innings with 168 strikeouts. His 2.83 ERA was the fourth-best in the Majors and his 1.04 WHIP was third-best in the league. He ended the season as the ace of the Orioles starting rotation, having been assigned a Game 1 playoff start against the Texas Rangers.

On February 15, 2024, general manager Mike Elias announced that Bradish was diagnosed with a sprain in the ulnar collateral ligament of his right elbow and would begin the season on the injured list. He was activated on May 2. He pitched seven no-hit innings in a 4–1 away win over the Chicago White Sox on 26 May. In eight starts for the Orioles, Bradish compiled a 2.75 ERA with 53 strikeouts across 39 1/3 innings pitched. On June 19, it was announced that Bradish had undergone Tommy John surgery, ending his season.

On August 26, 2025, Bradish was activated from the injured list to make his season debut and return from surgery. He earned his first win in 15 months in a 4–1 away victory over the Chicago White Sox on September 15, his fourth start since returning from the injured list. Bradish started six games in 2025 and had a 1–1 record, a 2.53 ERA, and 47 strikeouts across 32 innings.

Prior to the 2026 season, Bradish defeated the Orioles in salary arbitration to earn $3.55 million as opposed to Baltimore's offer of $2.875 million. On June 17, 2026, Bradish recorded a career–high 12 strikeouts over 7 2/3 innings in a 5–3 victory over the Seattle Mariners. He became the highest-paid pitcher in Orioles history at the time when he and the team agreed to a five-year, $90 million contract extension on July 18. On September 13, Bradish was placed on 15-day injury list for lower abdominal discomfort, the day after a start against the Toronto Blue Jays. He was diagnosed with a sports hernia a few days later. It was subsequently announced Bradish would undergo surgery and miss the remainder of the season. Bradish made 29 starts for the Orioles and ended the regular season with a 7–14 record, 4.12 ERA, and 142 strikeouts across 155 innings.
