= Zach Peek =

American baseball player (born 1998)

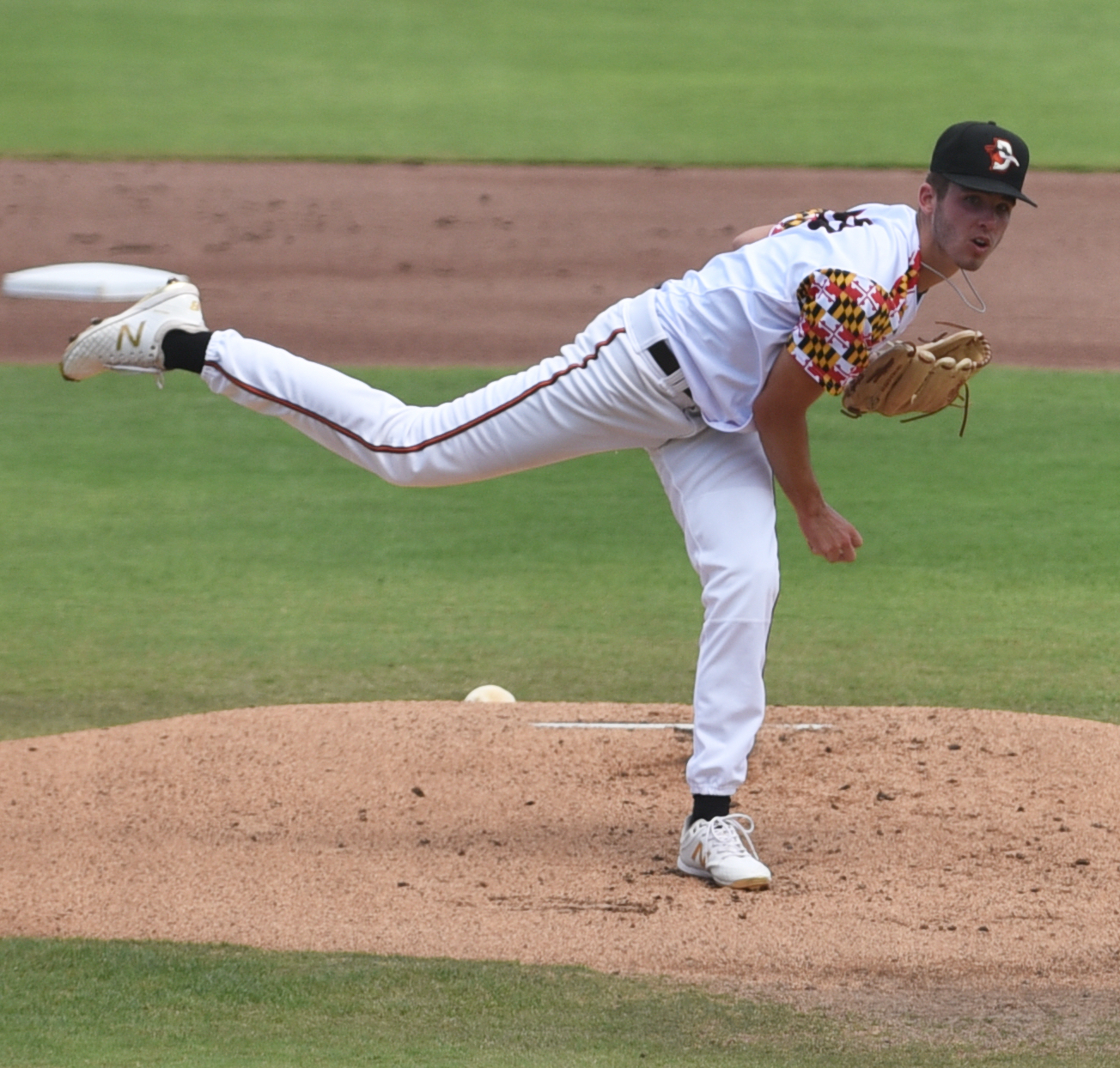
- Peek with the Delmarva Shorebirds in 2021

Free agent
- Pitcher
- Born: May 6, 1998 (age 28); Pineville, North Carolina, U.S.
- Bats: Right Throws: Right

Zachary Allen Peek (born May 6, 1998) is an American professional baseball pitcher who is a free agent.

== Early life and education ==
Zachary Allen Peek was born in Pineville, North Carolina on May 6, 1998, the son of David and Courtney Peek.

He attended Jefferson Forest High School in Forest, Virginia, and later studied at Winthrop University.

== Baseball career ==
=== Amateur ===
Peek played college baseball at Winthrop University. In 2018, he played collegiate summer baseball in the Cape Cod Baseball League with the Bourne Braves. As a junior in 2019, he started 14 games and went 7–3 with a 4.02 ERA and 91 strikeouts over 87 1/3 innings.

=== Baltimore Orioles ===
Peek was selected by the Los Angeles Angels in the sixth round (181st overall) of the 2019 Major League Baseball draft and signed.

On December 4, 2019, Peek (alongside Kyle Bradish, Isaac Mattson, and Kyle Brnovich) was traded to the Baltimore Orioles in exchange for Dylan Bundy. He did not play in a game in 2020 due to the cancellation of the minor league season because of the COVID-19 pandemic.

Peek made his professional debut in 2021 with the Single-A Delmarva Shorebirds and was promoted to the High-A Aberdeen IronBirds during the season. Over 23 games (16 starts) between the two affiliates, he went 6–3 with a 3.80 ERA and 122 strikeouts over ninety innings pitched. Peek opened the 2022 season with the Double-A Bowie Baysox. He made 11 starts for Bowie, in which he went 0–3 with a 3.57 ERA and forty strikeouts over 45 1/3 innings before undergoing Tommy John surgery, forcing him to miss the remainder of the season. Peek pitched only 10 2/3 innings in 2023 while recovering, splitting time between Aberdeen, Delmarva, and the rookie-level Florida Complex League Orioles. After the season, he was selected to play in the Arizona Fall League for the Mesa Solar Sox.

Peek played in eight games in 2024 with Delmarva and Bowie, pitching to a cumulative 4.02 ERA with 20 strikeouts and one save across 15 2/3 innings pitched,

=== Milwaukee Brewers ===
On December 11, 2024, Peek was selected by the Milwaukee Brewers in the minor league phase of the Rule 5 draft. He was assigned to the High-A Wisconsin Timber Rattlers to open the 2025 season and was later promoted to the Double-A Biloxi Shuckers. In 43 appearances out of the bullpen for the two affiliates, Peek accumulated an 11-3 record and 3.63 ERA with 75 strikeouts and three saves across 69 1/3 innings pitched. Peek elected free agency following the season on November 6.

=== New York Mets ===
On December 13, 2025, Peek signed a minor league contract with the New York Mets. He made 40 appearances (including three starts) split between the Double–A Binghamton Rumble Ponies and Triple–A Syracuse Mets, posting a cumulative 3–2 record and 4.76 ERA with 60 strikeouts and one save across 51 innings of work. On September 9, 2026, Peek was released by the Mets organization.
