= Owasso Reporter =

- Type: Weekly newspaper
- Format: Broadsheet
- Publisher: Gloria Fletcher
- News editor: Art Haddaway
- Founded: 1964
- Ceased publication: 2025
- Language: English
- Headquarters: Owasso, OK, U.S.
- Circulation: 3,600
- Website: owassoreporter.com

The Owasso Reporter was a weekly newspaper in Owasso, Oklahoma. Founded in 1964, it was published every Wednesday by Tulsa World Media Company, a Berkshire Hathaway Media Group company. The newspaper published its final edition on Jan. 15, 2025, and its coverage was folded into the Tulsa World.
