= Collinsville, Oklahoma =

- City
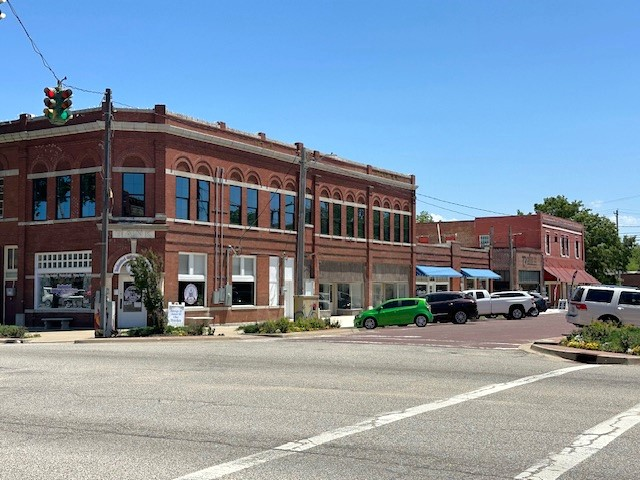
- Downtown Collinsville in May of 2025
- Nickname: The Center of it All
- Location of within Tulsa County, and the state of Oklahoma
- Coordinates: 36°22′2″N 95°50′23″W
- Country: United States
- State: Oklahoma
- Counties: Tulsa, Rogers
- Settled: 1897
- Incorporated: 1899

Government
  - Type: Council-manager city
  - City manager: Pam Polk
  - Mayor: Larry Shafer

Area
  - Total: 8.23 sq mi (21.32 km^{2})
  - Land: 8.16 sq mi (21.13 km^{2})
  - Water: 0.073 sq mi (0.19 km^{2})
- Elevation: 676 ft (206 m)

Population (2020)
  - Total: 7,881
  - Density: 970/sq mi (373/km^{2})
- Time zone: UTC-6 (Central)
  - Summer (DST): UTC-5 (Central)
- ZIP code: 74021
- Area codes: 539/918
- FIPS code: 40-16350
- GNIS feature ID: 2410195
- Website: cityofcollinsville.com

Collinsville is a city in Rogers and Tulsa counties in the U.S. state of Oklahoma, and a part of the Tulsa, Oklahoma Metropolitan Statistical Area. It was named for Dr. A. H. Collins, an engineer and surveyor who first surveyed the land that became this community. The population was 7,881 by the 2020 United States census, a 40.6% increase over the figure of 5,606 according to the 2010 census, which itself was an increase of 37.5 percent over the figure of 4,077 recorded in 2000.

== History ==
Dr. A. H. Collins, the town namesake, established a post office on May 28, 1897. Henry P. Cook was the first postmaster. Then it became known as either Collins or Collins Post Office. The name officially became Collinsville by June 1898 and it incorporated as a city in April 1899. The population in 1900 was 376.

The Atchison, Topeka and Santa Fe, though its Kansas, Oklahoma Central and Southwestern Railway subsidiary, routed its line from Kansas to Owasso, approximately one mile west of Collinsville in 1899, to avoid crossing an additional stream. An earlier community, known as Eli, had developed southeast but moved all their buildings closer to the railroad. The buildings were moved on rollers in 1899 and 1900.

Collinsville originally was located in Rogers County. In 1918, the residents voted to be annexed by Tulsa County, in order to be nearer a county seat. It was only 20 miles (32 km) north of Tulsa.

An abundant supply of sulfur-free coal lay near the surface, which attracted fifteen hundred to two thousand miners. Oil and gas production and zinc smelting boomed briefly during the first two decades of the 20th century. The local population swelled to around eight thousand people. But the population swiftly declined as these businesses ceased. By 1930, there were 2,249 residents. Since the 1920s, the economy has been based primarily on agriculture. Several dairies are located in Collinsville, many delivering products to Tulsa. In 1948, Oklahoma Agricultural and Mechanical University (now Oklahoma State University) named Collinsville "the Dairy Capital of Oklahoma."

== Geography ==
Collinsville is approximately 20 mi north of Tulsa, and lies within a triangle formed by the Caney River, Verdigris River and Bird Creek. According to the United States Census Bureau, the city has a total area of 6.0 square miles (15.5 km^{2}), of which 5.9 square miles (15.4 km^{2}) is land and 0.1 square mile (0.2 km^{2}) (1.17%) is water.

== Demographics ==
=== 2020 census ===
As of the 2020 census, Collinsville had a population of 7,881. The median age was 34.8 years. 27.0% of residents were under the age of 18 and 14.7% of residents were 65 years of age or older. For every 100 females there were 97.8 males, and for every 100 females age 18 and over there were 94.2 males age 18 and over.

83.9% of residents lived in urban areas, while 16.1% lived in rural areas.

There were 2,964 households in Collinsville, of which 38.9% had children under the age of 18 living in them. Of all households, 54.5% were married-couple households, 15.8% were households with a male householder and no spouse or partner present, and 24.0% were households with a female householder and no spouse or partner present. About 24.3% of all households were made up of individuals and 11.4% had someone living alone who was 65 years of age or older.

There were 3,143 housing units, of which 5.7% were vacant. Among occupied housing units, 73.0% were owner-occupied and 27.0% were renter-occupied. The homeowner vacancy rate was 1.3% and the rental vacancy rate was 5.3%.

Racial composition as of the 2020 census
Race	Percent
White	68.3%
Black or African American	1.2%
American Indian and Alaska Native	10.9%
Asian	1.9%
Native Hawaiian and Other Pacific Islander	<0.1%
Some other race	2.0%
Two or more races	15.7%
Hispanic or Latino (of any race)	5.5%

=== 2010 census ===
As of the 2010 census, there were 5,606 people, 2,111 households, and 1,529 families residing in the city. The population density was 785.7 inhabitants per square mile (303.4/km^{2}). There were 1,688 housing units at an average density of 284.8 per square mile (110.0/km^{2}). The racial makeup of the city was 76.3% White, 1.2% African American, 12.2% Native American, 2.1% Asian (1.5% Hmong), 0.01% Pacific Islander, 0.8% from other races, and 7.3% from two or more races. Hispanic or Latino of any race were 3.1% of the population.

There were 1,550 households, out of which 35.7% had children under the age of 18 living with them, 56.5% were married couples living together, 11.1% had a female householder with no husband present, and 28.2% were non-families. 24.9% of all households were made up of individuals, and 11.0% had someone living alone who was 65 years of age or older. The average household size was 2.55 and the average family size was 3.02.

In the city, the population was spread out, with 27.0% under the age of 18, 8.0% from 18 to 24, 29.8% from 25 to 44, 20.7% from 45 to 64, and 14.5% who were 65 years of age or older. The median age was 35 years. For every 100 females, there were 93.8 males. For every 100 females age 18 and over, there were 88.4 males.

The median income for a household in the city was $53,874 and the median income for a family was $57,235. The per capita income for the city was $22,661. About 7.3% of families and 5.7% of the population were below the poverty line, including 17.4% of those under age 18 and 7.3% of those age 65 or over.

== Economy ==
In its early years, Collinsville's economy was largely based on coal mining. That industry declined during the 1920s and was replaced by agriculture as the mainstay of the local economy. The Sallee Family Dairy started up in 1912, with local deliveries by buggy. By 1926, Sallee was delivering by truck to Tulsa. There was also a milk producers' cooperative and a cheese factory in the 1930s.

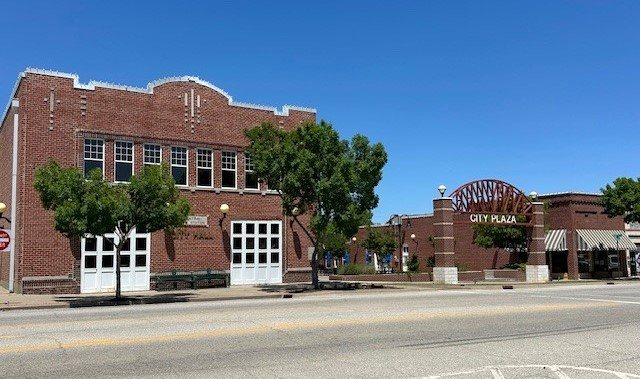
Collinsville City Hall & City Plaza in May 2025

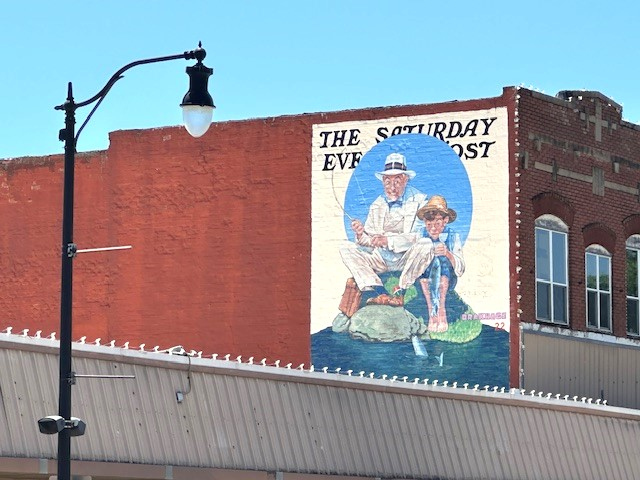
Saturday Evening Post Mural in Downtown Collinsville, May 2025

== Government ==
Collinsville has a home rule charter form of government.

== Media ==
Collinsville has one newspaper, the Collinsville Times Star. Originally named the Collinsville Times, it began publication May 11, 1899. It is Tulsa County's oldest newspaper and Collinsville's oldest continuously operating business. The paper is published every Wednesday.

Collinsville news is also included in the Owasso newspaper, the Owasso Reporter. The paper is published every Wednesday.

Collinsville has a community website, Cvilleok.com.

Four months after the wrap in Collinsville on the film The Last Rodeo, Collinsville received a “film-friendly” certification from the Oklahoma Film + Music Office. This follows the production of other films in Collinsville including Mister Larry Visits Bigfoot, as well as approval in July 2024 of an Historic Preservation District covering Collinsville’s photogenic downtown.
