= Kansas, Oklahoma Central and Southwestern Railway =

Overview
- Locale: Oklahoma and Kansas
- Dates of operation: 1893–1900

Technical
- Track gauge: 4 ft 8 1/2 in (1,435 mm)
- Length: 56.85 mi (91.49 km)

The Kansas, Oklahoma Central and Southwestern Railway (“KOC&S”) was a railroad which in 1899 built tracks from a point near Caney, Kansas to what became Owasso, Oklahoma. After foreclosure in 1900, it was absorbed into the Atchison, Topeka and Santa Fe Railway (“AT&SF”).

== History ==
The Kansas, Oklahoma Central and Southwestern Railway Company was incorporated under the laws of both the Territory of Oklahoma on June 14, 1893, and the State of Kansas on August 17, 1894. The railroad had big plans: in order to tap the growing cattle industry, it would run from its headquarters in Cherryvale, Kansas generally southwest through Bartlesville, Oklahoma (then in Indian Territory), on through Guthrie, Oklahoma (then in Oklahoma Territory), and terminate in Vernon, Texas. The KOC&S obtained the necessary authorizations from Congress dated December 21, 1893, February 15, 1897, and the last in February 1899, allowing its main line to run through Bartlesville, Pawhuska, Pawnee, Stillwater, Guthrie and El Reno, and even allowing a separate branch line starting from near Bartlesville to run south through Collinsville, Okmulgee, Wewoka, and Tishomingo to Sherman, Texas.

Against that backdrop, the company did preliminary location and grading work running south from the Kansas-Oklahoma border near Caney through to Collinsville. But in February 1899, agreement was reached for ownership of the railroad to be turned over to the AT&SF. All work after that point was actually done by the AT&SF, which choose to have some of the congressionally-authorized trackage assembled by other AT&SF affiliates, an example being the Guthrie through Stillwater to Pawnee section constructed by the Eastern Oklahoma Railway. The line built in 1899 under the KOC&S name was a single standard-gauge track, leased to and operated by the AT&SF, which started from the Kansas-Oklahoma border just south of Caney, Kansas, and specifically from a point on that border known as Owen, Oklahoma. It proceeded south, passing through Bartlesville, Oklahoma which had eagerly awaited a railroad since the very-productive Nellie Johnstone No. 1 oil well had been completed in 1897 but had to be capped while awaiting a way to move the production to more lucrative markets. The line continued to just west of Collinsville (to avoid crossing an additional creek in route to the town), causing the town to move its wooden buildings on rollers to the new location next to the tracks. The line dead-ended further south at a depot about one mile from a man-made lake. This locale was just far enough south to reach cattle drives from ranches along Bird Creek, but was about three miles northwest of the nearest town, which was called Elm Creek. The completed line aggregated 56.85 miles. Referring to the end of the railroad, that area became known unofficially by the Osage or possibly Cherokee name of “Owasso,” meaning “end of the trail” or “the turn around.” Businesses and residences from Elm Creek began moving to the depot site, causing the original Elm Creek settlement to be essentially abandoned. The official postal designation for the relocated town was changed from Elm Creek to Owasso on January 24, 1900.

The railroad was sold at foreclosure June 29, 1900, ending up being absorbed into the AT&SF on July 2, 1900. In subsequent history, the AT&SF extended the tracks into Tulsa in 1905. After further changes in ownership over time, the route continues to be run today, now operated by the South Kansas and Oklahoma Railroad.
