= Owasso Independent School District v. Falvo =

- Supreme Court of the United States

Argued November 27, 2001 Decided February 19, 2002
- Full case name: OWASSO INDEPENDENT SCHOOL DISTRICT NO. I-011, AKA OWASSO PUBLIC SCHOOLS, ET AL. v. FALVO, PARENT AND NEXT FRIEND OF HER MINOR CHILDREN, PLETAN, ET AL.
- Docket no.: 00-1073
- Citations: 534 U.S. 426 (more) 122 S. Ct. 934; 151 L. Ed. 2d 896; 2002 U.S. LEXIS 619; 70 U.S.L.W. 4123; 2002 Cal. Daily Op. Service 1546; 2002 Daily Journal DAR 1869; 15 Fla. L. Weekly Fed. S 116
- Reargument: Reargument

Case history
- Prior: 146 F. Supp. 2d 1137 (N.D. Okla. 1999); affirmed in part, reversed in part, 233 F.3d 1203 (10th Cir. 2000); rehearing en banc denied, 233 F.3d 1201 (10th Cir. 2000); cert. granted, 533 U.S. 927 (2001).

Holding
- Peer grading does not violate the Family Educational Rights and Privacy Act of 1974.

Court membership
- Chief Justice William Rehnquist Associate Justices John P. Stevens · Sandra Day O'Connor; Antonin Scalia · Anthony Kennedy; David Souter · Clarence Thomas; Ruth Bader Ginsburg · Stephen Breyer

Case opinions
- Majority: Kennedy, joined by Rehnquist, Stevens, O'Connor, Souter, Thomas, Ginsburg, Breyer
- Concurrence: Scalia (in judgment)

Laws applied
- Family Educational Rights and Privacy Act

Owasso Independent School District v. Falvo, 534 U.S. 426 (2002), was a case in which the United States Supreme Court held in favor of Owasso Independent School District that students scoring each other's tests and calling out the grades do not violate the Family Educational Rights and Privacy Act of 1974 (FERPA). Justice Kennedy wrote the opinion of the court. Justice Scalia wrote a concurring opinion in which he agreed with the ruling but took issue with parts of Kennedy's opinion. The case originated in the District Court of and for Tulsa County, Oklahoma, where the court ruled in Owasso's favor. Falvo appealed to the United States District Court for the Northern District of Oklahoma, where they overturned the district judge's decision and ruled in favor of Falvo. It was then appealed to the United States Court of Appeals for the 10th Circuit, where they partially reversed the lower court's judgment and partially affirmed it. They affirmed in regards to the 14th Amendment complaint, but reversed on the FERPA claim, stating that the peer grading act did violate the terms of FERPA. The school board then appealed this to the Supreme Court of the United States, where it was heard on November 27, 2001, and decided on February 19, 2002.
