= Kyle Brnovich =

American baseball player (born 1997)

Free agent
- Pitcher
- Born: October 20, 1997 (age 28); Cincinnati, Ohio, U.S.
- Bats: Left Throws: Right

Kyle Griffin Brnovich (born October 20, 1997) is an American professional baseball pitcher who is a free agent.

== Career ==
=== Amateur ===
Brnovich attended King's Ridge Christian School in Milton, Georgia, and played college baseball at Elon University. In 2018, he played collegiate summer baseball with the Harwich Mariners of the Cape Cod Baseball League. As a junior in 2019, he started 14 games and went 7–3 with a 3.66 ERA and 110 strikeouts over 86 innings.

=== Baltimore Orioles ===
Brnovich was selected by the Los Angeles Angels in the eighth round (241st overall) of the 2019 Major League Baseball draft. On December 4, 2019, Brnovich (alongside Isaac Mattson, Kyle Bradish, and Zach Peek) was traded to the Baltimore Orioles in exchange for Dylan Bundy. He did not play in a game in 2020 due to the cancellation of the minor league season because of the COVID-19 pandemic.

Brnovich made his professional debut in 2021 with the Aberdeen IronBirds of the High-A East and was promoted to the Bowie Baysox of the Double-A Northeast during the season. Over 23 games (19 starts) between the two teams, he went 6–2 with a 3.32 ERA and 123 strikeouts over 95 innings. Brnovich was assigned to the Norfolk Tides of the Triple-A International League to begin the 2022 season. After two starts, he was placed on the injured list with an elbow sprain. He underwent Tommy John surgery shortly after, forcing him to miss all of the 2022 season.

In 2023, Brnovich made rehab appearances for the rookie-level Florida Complex League Orioles, Single-A Delmarva Shorebirds, High-A Aberdeen, and Double-A Bowie; in eight appearances (six starts) for the four affiliates, he accumulated an 0-2 record and 4.50 ERA with 34 strikeouts over 26 innings of work. He returned to Bowie for the 2024 season, registering a 6-2 record and 3.96 ERA with 77 strikeouts across 75 innings pitched.

Brnovich made 16 appearances (15 starts) split between Norfolk and the rookie-level FCL Orioles, struggling to a cumulative 2-4 record and 6.12 ERA with 74 strikeouts across 64 2/3 innings pitched. Brnovich was released by the Orioles organization on August 7, 2025.

=== Colorado Rockies ===
On August 12, 2025, Brnovich signed a minor league contract with the Colorado Rockies. He made seven appearances (four starts) for the Triple-A Albuquerque Isotopes, but struggled to a 1-2 record and 11.57 ERA with 17 strikeouts across 18 2/3 innings pitched. Brnovich elected free agency following the season on November 6.

=== Philadelphia Phillies ===
On December 13, 2025, Brnovich signed a minor league contract with the Philadelphia Phillies. He made 17 appearances (including 16 starts) for the Double–A Reading Fightin Phils, compiling a 1–8 record and 6.66 ERA with 62 strikeouts across 74 1/3 innings pitched. Brnovich was released by Philadelphia on July 26, 2026.
