= Protection of Pupil Rights Amendment =

The Protection of Pupil Rights Amendment (PPRA) of 1978, sometimes referred to as the Hatch Amendment, is a law intended to protect the rights of pupils and the parents of pupils in programs funded by the United States Department of Education (ED).

Implementation of the amendment was overseen by LeRoy Rooker.

== Provisions ==
The Protection of Pupil Rights Amendment applies to programs that get their funding from the United States Department of Education. The PPRA was written to protect the rights of parents and students in two specific ways. First, any material used by students in ED funded surveys, analyses, or evaluations will be made available to parents to inspect prior to use with their child. Secondly, it ensures that schools and contractors acquire written parental consent before a minor student is required to participate in ED funded surveys, analyses or evaluations which may reveal personal information about the following:

- Political affiliations or beliefs of the student or student's parent;
- Mental or psychological problems of the student or student's family;
- Illegal, anti-social, self-incriminating, or demeaning behavior;
- Critical appraisals of others with whom respondents have close family relationships;
- Legally recognized privileged relationships, such as with lawyers, doctors, or ministers;
- Religious practices, affiliations, or beliefs of the student or parents; or
- Income, other than as required by law to determine program eligibility.
- Sex behavior or attitudes

Parents are given the right to grant permission for their child to participate in the surveys, analyses or evaluations requiring the above content or they also have the choice to opt their child out of sharing such information with the school.
