= Family Educational Rights and Privacy Act =

Act of the United States Congress

FERPA
- Long title: Family Educational Rights and Privacy Act
- Enacted by: the 93rd United States Congress

Citations
- Public law: Pub. L. 93–380
- Statutes at Large: 88 Stat. 571

Legislative history
- Introduced in the Senate by James L. Buckley (C-R–NY); Passed the House on January 3, 1973; Passed the Senate on February 21, 1974; Signed into law by President Gerald Ford on August 21, 1974

Major amendments
- USA Patriot Act

United States Supreme Court cases
- Owasso Independent School District v. Falvo, 534 U.S. 426 (2002); Gonzaga University v. Doe, 536 U.S. 273 (2002)

The Family Educational Rights and Privacy Act of 1974 (FERPA) is a United States federal law that governs the access to educational information and records by public entities such as potential employers, publicly funded educational institutions, and foreign governments. The act is also referred to as the Buckley Amendment, for one of its proponents, Senator James L. Buckley of New York.

FERPA is a U.S. federal law that regulates access and disclosure of student education records. It grants parents access to their child's records, allows amendments, and controls disclosure. After a student turns 18, their consent is generally required for disclosure. The law applies to institutions receiving U.S. Department of Education funds and provides privacy rights to students 18 years or older, or those in post-secondary institutions. Disclosure is permitted to parents of dependent students, and medical records are usually protected under FERPA rather than HIPAA. The law has faced criticism for concealing non-educational public records.

== Overview ==
FERPA gives parents access to their child's education records, an opportunity to seek to have the records amended, and some control over the disclosure of information from the records. With several exceptions, schools must have a student's consent prior to the disclosure of education records after that student is 18 years old. The law applies only to educational agencies and institutions that receive funds under a program administered by the U.S. Department of Education.

Other regulations under this Act, effective starting January 3, 2012, allow for greater disclosures of personal and directory student identifying information and regulate disclosure of student IDs and e-mail addresses. For example, schools may provide external companies with a student's personally identifiable information without the student's consent. Conversely, tying student directory information to other information may result in a violation, as the combination creates an education record.

Examples of situations affected by FERPA include school employees divulging information to anyone other than the student about the student's grades or behavior, and school work posted on a bulletin board with a grade. Generally, schools must have written permission from the parent or eligible student in order to release any information from a student's education record.

This privacy policy also governs how state agencies transmit testing data to federal agencies, such as the Education Data Exchange Network.

This U.S. federal law also gave students 18 years of age or older, or students of any age if enrolled in any post-secondary educational institution, the right of privacy regarding grades, enrollment, and even billing information unless the school has specific permission from the student to share that specific type of information.

FERPA also permits a school to disclose personally identifiable information from education records of an "eligible student" (a student age 18 or older or enrolled in a postsecondary institution at any age) to their parents if the student is a dependent "student" as that term is defined in Section 152 of the Internal Revenue Code. Generally, if either parent has claimed the student as a dependent on the parent's most recent U.S. Federal income tax return, the school may non-consensually disclose the student's education records to both parents.

The law allowed students who apply to an educational institution such as graduate school permission to view recommendations submitted by others as part of the application. On standard application forms, students are given the option to waive this right.

FERPA specifically excludes employees of an educational institution if they are not students.

FERPA is now a guide to communicating higher education issues and privacy issues that include sexual assault and campus safety. It provides a framework on addressing needs of certain populations in higher education.

Due to a 1998 amendment, FERPA does not prohibit the public disclosure of "the final results of any disciplinary proceeding in which a student has been found responsible for a crime of violence or nonforcible sex offense." This exception only applies to postsecondary schools for disciplinary proceedings after October 7, 1998. The final outcome may also be disclosed to the victim, even if the accused is not found to have committed the offense.

== Access to public records ==
The citing of FERPA to conceal public records that are not "educational" in nature has been widely criticized, including criticism by the Act's primary Senate sponsor.

== Peer-grading ==
In Owasso Independent School District v. Falvo, an important part of the case was determining the relationship between peer-grading and "education records" as defined in FERPA. The plaintiffs argued "that allowing students to score each other's tests [...] as the teachers explain the correct answers to the entire class [...] embarrassed [...] children", but they lost in a summary judgment by the district court. The Court of Appeals, ruled that students placing grades on the work of other students made such work into an "education record." Thus, peer-grading was determined as a violation of FERPA privacy policies because students had access to other students' academic performance without full consent. However, on appeal to the Supreme Court, it was unanimously ruled that peer-grading was not a violation of FERPA. This is because a grade written on a student's work does not become an "education record" until the teacher writes the final grade into a grade book.

== Student medical records ==
Legal experts have debated the issue of whether student medical records (e.g. records of therapy sessions with a therapist at an on-campus counseling center) might be released to the school administration under certain triggering events, such as when a student sues their college or university.

Usually, student medical treatment records will remain under the protection of FERPA, not the Health Insurance Portability and Accountability Act (HIPAA). This is due to the "FERPA Exception" written within HIPAA.

== See also ==
- Gonzaga University v. Doe
- Liability and student records
- Owasso Independent School District v. Falvo
