= Peer assessment =

Peer assessment, or self-assessment, is a process whereby students or their peers grade assignments or tests based on a teacher's benchmarks. The practice is employed to save teachers time and improve students' understanding of course materials as well as improve their metacognitive skills. Rubrics are often used in conjunction with self- and peer-assessment.

== Advantages ==
=== Saves teachers' time ===
Student grade assignments can save teacher's time because an entire classroom can be graded together in the time that it would take a teacher to grade one paper. Moreover, rather than having a teacher rush through each paper, students are able to take their time to correct them. Students can spend more time on a paper because they only have to grade one and can therefore do a more thorough job.

=== Faster feedback ===
Having students grade papers in class or assess their peers' oral presentations decreases the time taken for students to receive their feedback. Instead of them having to wait for feedback on their work, self- and peer-assessment allow assignments to be graded soon after completion. Students then do not have to wait until they have moved onto new material and the information is no longer fresh in their minds.

The faster turnaround time of feedback has been also shown to increase the likelihood of adoption by the feedback recipient. A controlled experiment conducted in a Massive Open Online Course (MOOC) setting found that students' final grades improved when feedback was delivered quickly, but not if delayed by 24 hours.

=== Pedagogical ===
Teacher's evaluation role makes the students focus more on the grades not seeking feedback. Students can learn from grading the papers or assessing the oral presentations of others. Often, teachers do not go over test answers and give students the chance to learn what they did wrong. Self and peer assessment allow teachers to help students understand the mistakes that they have made. This will improve subsequent work and allow students time to digest information and may lead to better understanding. A study by Sadler and Good found that students who self-graded their tests did better on later tests. The students could see what they had done wrong and were able correct such errors in later assignments. After peer grading, students did not necessarily achieve higher results.

Peer feedback can also enhance learners' audience awareness, promote collaborative learning, and develop a sense of ownership of the text. Text analysis of the survey conducted by Fan, Yumei, and Jinfen Xu showed that these students provided content-focused and form-focused evaluative feedback to their peers, while their peers provided feedback on manuscripts or orals in class.

Turpin and Kristen M’s experiments found that peer feedback is very important for learners to participate in the learning process. Secondly, the quality of peer feedback is also crucial. Systematically trained feedback allows peers to provide high-quality, actionable feedback.

=== Metacognitive ===
Through self- and peer-assessment students are able to see mistakes in their thinking and can correct any problems in future assignments. By grading assignments, students may learn how to complete assignments more accurately and how to improve their test results.

Professors Lin-Agler, Moore, and Zabrucky conducted an experiment in which they found "that students are able to use their previous experience from preparing for and taking a test to help them build a link between their study time allocation." Students can not only improve their ability to study for a test after participating in self- and peer- assessment but also enhance their ability to evaluate others through improved metacognitive thinking.

However, in the experiments of Christensen, Vibeke and Peter Hobel, they found that the content that students evaluated was all about content, structure and form. Feedback on the sentences themselves is almost non-existent.

=== Attitude ===
If self- and peer-assessment are implemented, students can come to see tests not as punishments but as useful feedback. Hal Malehorn says that by using peer evaluation, classmates can work together for "common intellectual welfare" and that it can create a "cooperative atmosphere" for students instead of one where students compete for grades. In addition, when students assess the works of their fellow students, they also reflect on their own works. This reflective process stimulates action for improvement.

However, in the Supreme Court Case Owasso Independent School District v. Falvo, the school was sued following victimization of an individual after other students learned that he had received a low test score. Malehorn attempts to show what the idealized version of peer-assessment can do for classroom attitude. In practice, situations where students are victimized can result as seen in the Supreme Court Case.

In an experimental investigation by Yallop, Roger, Piia Taremaa, and Djuddah Leijen, they found that the feedback process can induce strong negative emotions in reviewers (e.g., frustration) and feedback recipients (e.g., anxiety). Therefore, the feedback process has a large impact. This influence can shape attitudes. A positive attitude encourages greater participation in the feedback process.

=== Defects ===
Research by Garner, Joe and Oliver Hadingham found serious flaws. Students take this group very seriously and rarely give negative comments. And there’s no constructive criticism of other people’s writing. In the study, anonymous evaluation was used to solve this problem, allowing students to evaluate others without pressure, but they also lost the ability to interact.

== Teacher grading agreement ==
One concern about self- and peer-assessment is that students may give higher grades than teachers. Teachers want to reduce grading time but not at the cost of losing accuracy.

=== Support ===
A study by Saddler and Good has shown that there is a high level of agreement between grades assigned by teachers and students as long as students are able to understand the teacher's quality requirements. They also report that teacher grading can be more accurate as a result of using self- and peer-assessment. If teachers look at how students grade themselves, then they have more information available from which to assign a more accurate grade.

=== Opposition ===
However, Saddler and Good warn that there is some disagreement. They suggest that teachers implement systems to moderate grading by students in order to catch unsatisfactory work. Another study reported that grade inflation did occur as students tended to grade themselves higher than a teacher would have. This would suggest that self- and peer-assessment are not an accurate method of grading due to divergent results.

=== Comparison ===
According to the study by Saddler and Good, students who peer grade tend to undergrade and students who are self graded tend to overgrade. However, a large majority of students do get within 5% of the teacher’s grade. Relatively few self graders undergrade and relatively few peer graders tend to overgrade.

Perhaps one of the most prominent models of peer-assessment can be found in design studios. One of the benefits of such studios comes from structured contrasts which can help novices notice differences that might otherwise have been accessible only for experts. In fact, it is a well known strategy for designers to use comparisons to get inspired. Some researchers designed systems that support comparative examples to surface helpful comparisons in educational settings. However, what makes a good comparison remains unclear; the general guidance of good feedback by Sadler describes three characteristics: specific, actionable, and justified, and has widely been adopted in feedback research. However, with each piece of work to be evaluated differing so vastly in content, the path towards those qualities in a specific feedback performance remains largely unknown. Effective feedback is not only written actionably, specifically, and in a justified manner, but more importantly, contains good content; good in the sense that it points out relevant things, brings in new insights, and changes the minds of its recipients to consider the problem from a different angle, or re-represent it completely. This requires content-specific customization.

== Rubrics ==
=== Purpose ===
Students need guidelines to follow before they are able to grade more open ended questions. These often come in the form of rubrics, which lay out different objectives and how much each is worth when grading. Rubrics are often used for writing assignments.

=== Examples of objectives ===
- Expression of ideas
- Organization of content
- Originality
- Subject knowledge
- Content
- Curriculum alignment
- Balance
- Voice

== Group work ==
One area in which self- and peer-assessment is being applied is in group projects. Teachers can give projects a final grade but also need to determine what grade each individual in the group deserves. Students can grade their peers and individual grades can be based on these assessments. Nevertheless, there are problems with this grading method. If students grade each other unfairly, the overall grades skew in different directions.

=== Overgenerosity ===
Some students may give all the other students remarkably high grades which will cause their scores to be lower compared to the others. This can be addressed by having students grade themselves and thus their generosity will also extend to themselves and raise their grades by the same amount. However, this does not compensate for students who feel they did not work at their best, and self-grade themselves too harshly.

=== Creative accounting ===
Some students will award everybody low marks and themselves exceedingly high marks to bias the data. This can be countered by checking student’s grades and making sure that they are consistent with where in the group their peers graded them.

=== Individual penalization ===
If all of the students go against one student because they feel that the individual did little work, then they will receive an exceptionally low grade. This is permissible if the student in question really did do truly little work but may require the instructor's intervention before it ends up as the final result.

== Classroom participation ==
While it is difficult to grade students on participation in a classroom setting because of its subjective nature, one method of grading participation is to use self- and peer-assessment. Professors Ryan, Marshall, Porter, and Jia conducted an experiment to see if using students to grade participation was effective. They found that there was a difference between a teacher's evaluation of participation and a student's. However, there was no academic significance, indicating that student's final grades were not affected by the difference in a teacher's evaluation and a student's. They concluded that self- and peer-assessment is an effective way to grade classroom participation.

== At scale ==
The peer-assessment mechanism is also the gold-standard in many creative tasks varied from reviewing the quality of scholarly articles or grant proposals to design studios. However, as the number of assessments to be done increases, challenges arise. One is that because no one providing assessment has a global understanding of the entire pool of submissions, local biases in judgment may be introduced (e.g. the range of a scale used to assess may be affected by the pool of submissions the assessor reviews) and noises in the ranking aggregated from individual peer-assessment may be added. On the other hand, because the ranked outcome is of utmost interest in many situations (e.g. allocating research grants to proposals or assigning letter grades to students), ways to systematically aggregate peer-wise assessment to recover the ranked order of submissions has many practical implications.

To tackle this, some researchers studied (1) evaluation schemes (e.g. ordinal grading, (2) algorithms to aggregate pairwise evaluation to more robustly estimate the global ranking of submissions, and (3) produce more optimal pairs to exchange feedback either by considering conflicts of interest or (4) by modeling a framework that reduces the error between individual- and community-level judgment on the value of a scholarly article.

== Legality ==
The legality of self- and peer-Assessment was challenged in the United States Supreme Court case of Owasso Independent School District v. Falvo. Kristja Falvo sued the school district where her son attended school because it used peer-assessment and he was teased about a low score. The teacher's right to use self- and peer-assessment was upheld by the court.
