= Owasso, Oklahoma =

Owasso
- City
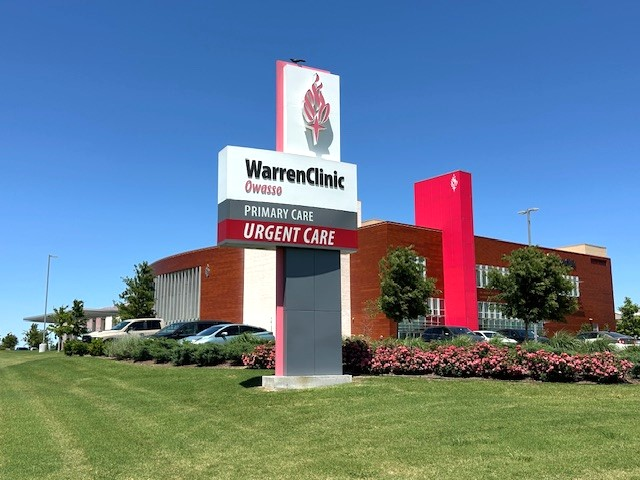
- Warren Clinic, dedicated January 3, 2023.

- Seal
- Nickname: The City Without Limits
- Location of within Tulsa County, and the state of Oklahoma

- Location in the United States Owasso (the United States)
- Coordinates: 36°17′16″N 95°49′52″W
- Country: United States
- State: Oklahoma
- Counties: Tulsa, Rogers
- Incorporated: 1904 (town in Indian Territory); 1972 (city chartered in Oklahoma)

Government
  - Type: Mayor–council government
  - Mayor: Alvin Fruga "cityofowasso.com". February 2026. (Ind.)

Area
  - Total: 17.02 sq mi (44.07 km^{2})
  - Land: 17.00 sq mi (44.02 km^{2})
  - Water: 0.019 sq mi (0.05 km^{2})
- Elevation: 709 ft (216 m)

Population (2022)
  - Total: 38,240
  - Density: 2,250.0/sq mi (868.73/km^{2})
- Time zone: UTC−6 (Central Standard Time)
  - Summer (DST): UTC-5 (Central Daylight Time)
- ZIP Code: 74055
- Area codes: Area codes 918 and 539
- FIPS code: 40-56650
- GNIS feature ID: 2411345
- Website: www.cityofowasso.com

Owasso (/ˈoʊˌwæsoʊ/) is a city in Rogers and Tulsa Counties in the U.S. state of Oklahoma, and the largest northern suburb of Tulsa. The population was 39,328 persons as of the 2022 census estimate, compared to 28,915 at the 2010 census, a gain of 36 percent. Originally settled in 1881 in Indian Territory, the town was incorporated in 1904 just prior to Oklahoma statehood and was chartered as a city in 1972.

== History ==
Owasso began as a settlement in 1881, located in the Cooweescoowee District of the Cherokee Nation in Indian Territory, near what is now 66th Street North and North 129th East Avenue. It was called Elm Creek and was named for Elm Creek, a tributary of Bird Creek. The first settler was H.T. (Tole) Richardson. In June 1893, plans began for a rail line to be extended south from Bartlesville to the cattle ranches in the vicinity of Bird Creek. At that time, already several residences, a blacksmith shop, and a general store were in the Elm Creek settlement. Preston Ballard, the owner of the general store, established a post office in the general store on February 10, 1898, and was appointed the first postmaster. The Joseph T. Barnes family moved to the settlement in 1897. Joseph and Luther Barnes bought the blacksmith shop in 1898. The first filling station was opened in 1902 by Donovan Ranta.

In 1897, the Kansas, Oklahoma Central and Southwestern Railway acquired right-of-way about 3 miles (4.8 km) northwest of the Elm Creek settlement, dammed a natural spring to form a lake as a water supply for the rail line, and built a depot about a mile south of the lake. The depot was torn down in 1942. Late in 1898, Joseph and Luther Barnes moved their blacksmith shop to the new community. The shop became a temporary home for the Joseph Barnes family. It was the first residence officially moved to the new depot community. In 1898, many of the residents and businesses moved from the Elm Creek settlement to the new community. Preston Ballard moved his post office and general store during that time. The new community became known as Elm Creek since the post office retained its name.

The railroad completed its line in 1899. Its parent company, the Atchison, Topeka & Santa Fe Railway Company, took over the line and property. The first train came into Elm Creek on November 1, 1899. As the land around the end of this railroad developed, the Osage word Owasso, meaning "the end of the trail" or "turn around", was adopted to identify the area because the rail line ended in a turnaround "Y" near the depot. The name of the Elm Creek post office was officially changed to Owasso on January 24, 1900. The rail line was not extended into Tulsa until 1905.

A plat of the original townsite of Owasso, Cherokee Nation, I.T. was signed by the Secretary of the Interior on March 26, 1904, in connection with the town's incorporation. That plat shows three streets running north and south and eight streets running east and west. The north-south streets were named Oklahoma, Kansas, and Missouri, and the east-west streets north of what is now Broadway were named for Union generals, while the east-west streets to the south were named for Confederate generals. These names were later changed; east-west streets are now identified by street numbers, and north-south streets are now named after trees. The original street names were changed to their present names around 1960.

By the time Oklahoma became a state on November 16, 1907, Owasso had a population of 379 within the town limits. The first newspaper was The Owasso Ledger which was first published on August 7, 1903, by U. P. Wardrip. The subscription price was $1.00 per year, paid in advance. The Pioneer Telephone and Telegraph Company was granted a franchise on February 6, 1905, for the town's first telephone exchange. Until the first water tower was erected in 1924, with Spavinaw as the water source, water came into town in barrels from Owasso Lake and sold for $0.50 a barrel.

Owasso was incorporated as a city on September 28, 1972.

Owasso came to its significant attention on February 8th, 2024, when 16-year-old Nex Benedict was found dead after getting into a fight at a school.

== Geography ==
Owasso is a northern suburb of Tulsa, Oklahoma, in the northeastern corner of Oklahoma known as "Green Country" for its vegetation, hills, woods, and lakes, in contrast to the drier Great Plains region of central and western Oklahoma. According to the United States Census Bureau, the city has an area of 16.31 square miles (42.2 km^{2}), 99.1% of which is land, the remainder water.

=== Climate ===
Owasso lies in Tornado Alley and has a temperate climate of the humid subtropical variety (Köppen Cfa) with a yearly average temperature of 60 °F (16 °C) and average precipitation of 39.5 inches (1,000 mm).

== Demographics ==
Historical population
Census	Pop.	Note	%±
1910	373		—
1920	379		1.6%
1930	416		9.8%
1940	371		−10.8%
1950	431		16.2%
1960	2,032		371.5%
1970	3,491		71.8%
1980	6,149		76.1%
1990	11,151		81.3%
2000	18,502		65.9%
2010	28,915		56.3%
2020	38,240		32.2%

=== 2020 census ===
As of the 2020 census, Owasso had a population of 38,240. The median age was 34.1 years. 27.1% of residents were under the age of 18 and 12.5% of residents were 65 years of age or older. For every 100 females there were 95.2 males, and for every 100 females age 18 and over there were 91.4 males age 18 and over.

96.7% of residents lived in urban areas, while 3.3% lived in rural areas.

There were 14,415 households in Owasso, of which 38.4% had children under the age of 18 living in them. Of all households, 51.7% were married-couple households, 16.4% were households with a male householder and no spouse or partner present, and 25.3% were households with a female householder and no spouse or partner present. About 24.1% of all households were made up of individuals and 9.0% had someone living alone who was 65 years of age or older.

There were 14,996 housing units, of which 3.9% were vacant. Among occupied housing units, 64.6% were owner-occupied and 35.4% were renter-occupied. The homeowner vacancy rate was 1.2% and the rental vacancy rate was 5.1%.

Racial composition as of the 2020 census
Race	Percentage
White	67.9%
Black or African American	4.0%
American Indian and Alaska Native	7.3%
Asian	2.8%
Native Hawaiian and Other Pacific Islander	0.1%
Some other race	3.1%
Two or more races	14.8%
Hispanic or Latino (of any race)	9.1%

=== 2010 census ===
As of the 2010 census, the population density was 2,259.5 people per square mile (5,852.08/km^{2}). The racial makeup of the city was 76.6% White, 4.7% Black, 5.8% Native American, 2.5% Asian, 0.1% Pacific Islander, and 8.0% from two or more races. Hispanics or Latinos of any race were 5.4% of the population. The average household size was 2.81. In the city, the population was distributed as 37.6% under the age of 18 and 11.1% who were 65 years of age or older.

The median income for a household in the city was $66,897. The per capita income for the city was $30,465. About 6.8% of the population was below the poverty line. Of the city's population over the age of 25, 33.8% held a bachelor's degree or higher.

== Economy ==
Owasso became a bedroom community in the 1950s for Tulsa, which was only 12 miles (19 km) away. As Tulsa expanded, so did the industry around Owasso, stimulating further growth. Industrial development proceeded through the 1980s and 1990s. Factories included American Airlines, with 9,000 employees, Nordam Group, with 700, Whirlpool, with 1,000 and MCI WorldCom with 2,200.

Owasso is served by the South Kansas and Oklahoma Railroad, which links to Tulsa, the Port of Catoosa, and points north.

== Government ==
Owasso has a council-manager form of government.

== Media ==
Owasso's newspapers, the Owasso Reporter and the Owasso Progress, are both published weekly. Until 2015, the Reporter was owned by Community Publishers, a newspaper and Internet publisher and commercial printer that serves Oklahoma, Missouri, and Arkansas. On Tuesday, April 21, 2015, the Tulsa World announced that its parent company BH Media, a division of Berkshire Hathaway, the Omaha-based investment holding company led by billionaire Warren Buffett, had purchased several suburban newspapers, including the Owasso Reporter.

The Progress is owned by Community Newspaper Holdings.

== Notable people ==
- Tommy Allsup, former Rockabilly and Western swing musician, record producer
- Randy Blake, kickboxer
- Jaime Bluma, former MLB pitcher for the Kansas City Royals
- Randy Brogdon, former member of the Oklahoma Senate and former mayor of Owasso
- Garth Brooks and Trisha Yearwood, country music singers; lived on a ranch east of Owasso for many years.
- Dylan Bundy, former pitcher for the Baltimore Orioles, 2011 Gatorade Player of the Year
- Dennis Byrd, former defensive end for the New York Jets
- Aaron Colvin, former cornerback for the Houston Texans
- Russ Dugger, NASCAR Truck Series racecar driver
- Jo Anna Dossett, member of the Oklahoma Senate
- Brian Flynn, former MLB pitcher for the Kansas City Royals
- Stacie L. Hixon, attorney and judge on the Oklahoma Court of Civil Appeals
- Vic Koenning, former professional football linebacker and college coach
- Jon Kolb, former offensive lineman with the Pittsburgh Steelers
- Pete Kozma, MLB shortstop
- Shake Milton, current basketball guard for Hapoel Jerusalem in the Israeli Basketball Premier League, formerly in the NBA
- Reese Mishler, actor
- Daryn Pittman, 2013 World of Outlaws sprint car champion
- Paul Smith, former quarterback; won Wuerffel Trophy at the University of Tulsa
- Rebel, AEW wrestler/manager and former Impact Wrestling wrestler, Dallas Cowboys Cheerleader, model, actress and cosmetologist

== See also ==
- Owasso Public Schools
